= John Howe =

John Howe may refer to:

== Politics ==
- John Howe (MP for Yarmouth)
- John Grobham Howe (died 1679) (1625–1679), British politician and MP for Gloucestershire
- John Grubham Howe (1657–1722), British politician
- Sir John Howe, 1st Baronet (died 1671), British politician and MP for Gloucestershire
- John Howe, 1st Baron Chedworth (died 1742), British MP for Gloucester and Wiltshire
- John Howe, 2nd Baron Chedworth (1714–1762), Lord Lieutenant of Gloucestershire
- John Howe, 4th Baron Chedworth (1754–1804), last Baron Chedworth
- John W. Howe (politician) (1801–1873), American politician from Pennsylvania
- John Howe (Minnesota politician) (born 1963), American politician from Minnesota
- John Thomas Howe, state legislator in North Carolina

== Religion ==
- John Howe (theologian) (1630–1705), English Puritan theologian
- John Howe (bishop) (1920–2001), Episcopal bishop of St Andrews, Dunkeld and Dunblane
- John W. Howe (bishop) (born 1942), bishop of the Episcopal Diocese of Central Florida

== Other ==
- John Howe (loyalist) (1754–1835), American loyalist and printer
- John Howe (Australian settler) (1774–1852), Chief Constable of Windsor, New South Wales
- John Howe (cricketer) (1868–1939), Australian cricketer
- John Howe (RAF officer) (1930–2016), South African–born fighter pilot
- John Howe (illustrator) (born 1957), Canadian book illustrator
- John H. Howe (architect) (1913–1997), American architect
- John H. Howe (judge) (1801–1873), Chief Justice of the Wyoming Territorial Supreme Court
- John Ireland Howe, inventor and manufacturer
- John T. Howe (engineer), American mechanical engineer
- John Howe (filmmaker) (1926-2008), Canadian film director and producer

== See also ==
- Jack Howe (disambiguation)
- Jackie Howe (1861–1920), Australian sheep shearer
- Jonathan Howe (born 1935), retired four-star United States Navy Admiral
