= J. T. Howe =

J. T. Howe may refer to:

- John T. Howe (engineer), American engineer
- John T. Howe (politician), North Carolina legislator
