= Jack Howe =

Jack Howe may refer to:

- Jack Howe (English footballer) (1915–1987), English footballer
- Jack Howe (Australian footballer) (1922–2001), Australian rules footballer
- Jack Howe (architect) (1911–2003), architect and industrial designer

== See also ==
- Jackie Howe (1861–1920), Australian sheep shearer
- John Howe (disambiguation)
