= Eulo, Queensland =

Eulo
- Town
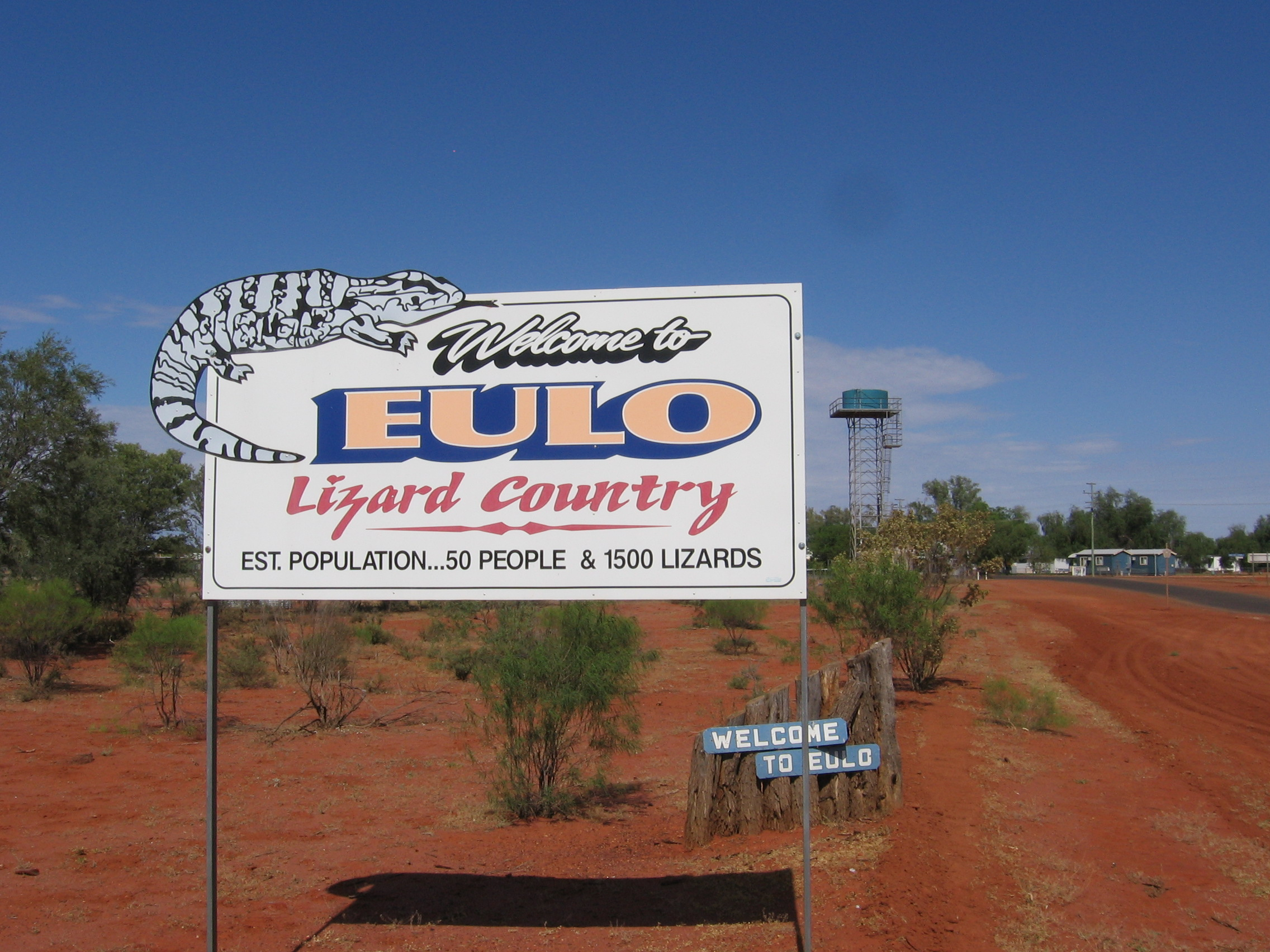
- Entry to Eulo, 2006

- Interactive map of Eulo
- Coordinates: 28.1594°S 145.0475°E
- Country: Australia
- State: Queensland
- LGA: Shire of Paroo
- Location: 67.2 km (41.8 mi) W of Cunnamulla; 129 km (80 mi) E of Thargomindah; 324 km (201 mi) NNW of Bourke; 361 km (224 mi) W of St George; 857 km (533 mi) W of Brisbane

Government
  - State electorate: Warrego
  - Federal division: Maranoa

Area
  - Total: 6,078.0 km^{2} (2,346.7 sq mi)
- Elevation: 137 m (449 ft)

Population
  - Total: 94 (2021 census)
  - Density: 0.01547/km^{2} (0.04006/sq mi)
- Time zone: UTC+10:00 (AEST)
- Postcode: 4491
- Mean max temp: 28.2 °C (82.8 °F)
- Mean min temp: 13.8 °C (56.8 °F)
- Annual rainfall: 332.0 mm (13.07 in)
Localities around Eulo
Yowah	Humeburn	Humeburn
Thargomindah	Eulo	Cunnamulla
Hungerford	Hungerford	Cuttaburra

Eulo (/juːloʊ/ YOU-low) is an outback town and locality in the Shire of Paroo, Queensland, Australia. It is known for its opal mining. In the 2021 census, the locality of Eulo had a population of 94 people.

== Geography ==
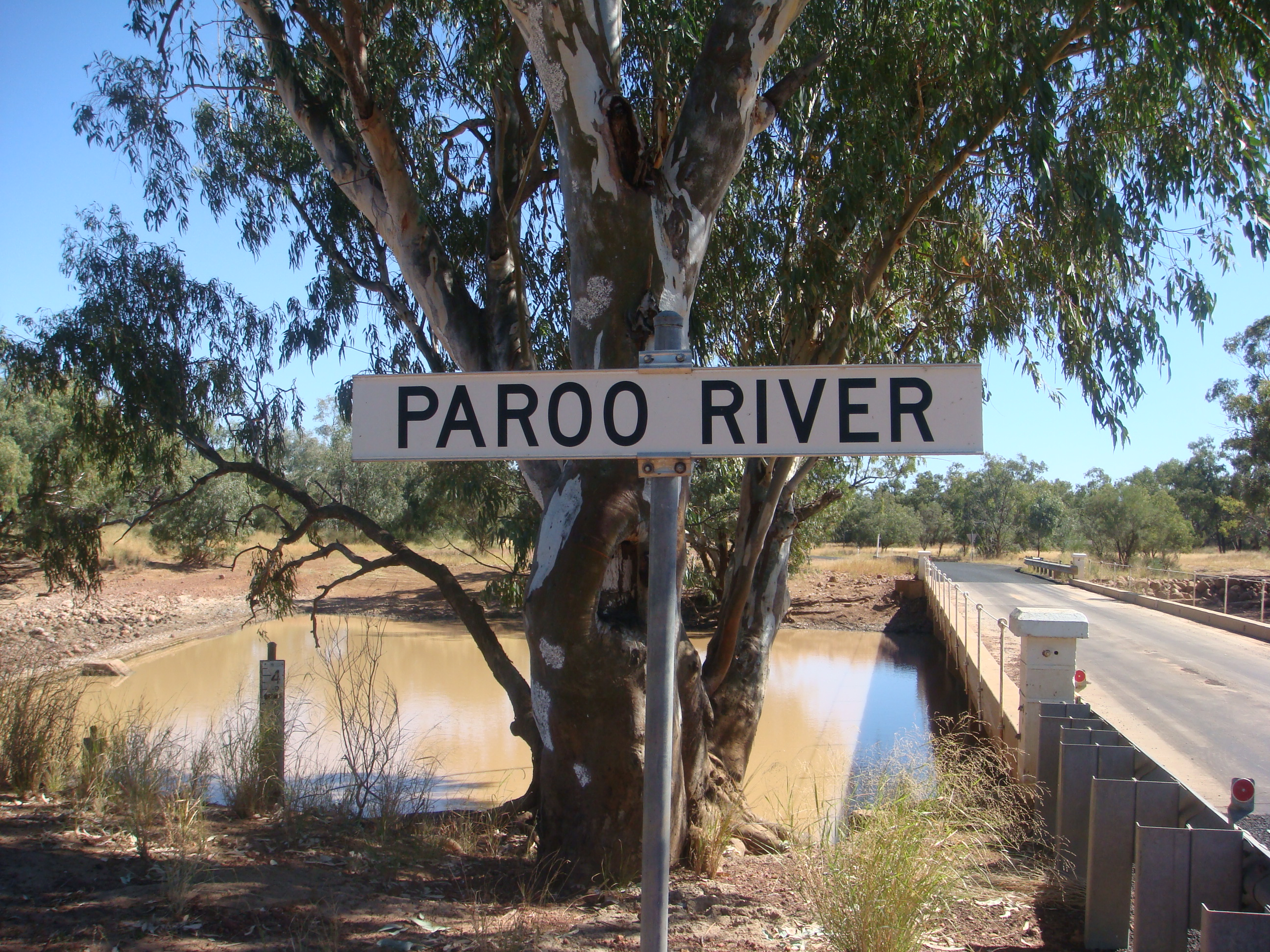
Paroo River near Eulo, 2008

Eulo is 64 kilometres (40 mi) west of Cunnamulla and 887 kilometres (551 mi) west of Brisbane.

The town is located beside and to the east of the Paroo River which flows in a roughly north–south direction. This results in flooding events that affects people, livestock, and wildlife. With Cyclone Audrey in mid-January 1964, the town experienced 11 inches (280 mm) of rain in one twenty-four hour period, which was double the previous record of 1887. Former-Cyclone Dianne saw flood waters came south from Longreach, resulting in the Paroo breaching the town's levee on Saturday, 29 March 2025. Occupants of only three houses were impacted, and sixty persons in the town otherwise unaffected.

The Bulloo Developmental Road (part of the Adventure Way) connects Eulo to Cunnamulla to the east and Thargomindah to the west.

Preferring barren, dry, rocky sites in only a few selected locations in Australia, the flowering Prostanthera megacalyx shrub can be found in the Eulo area.

== History ==
Prior to European settlement, Eulo was in the area of the Kalali people. Margany (also known as Marganj, Mardigan, Marukanji, Maranganji) is an Australian Aboriginal language spoken by the Margany people. The Margany language region includes the landscape within the local government boundaries of the Quilpie Shire, taking in Quilpie, Cheepie and Beechal extending towards Eulo and Thargomindah, as well as the properties of Dynevor Downs and Ardoch.

Vincent Dowling (1835–1903) began exploring in south west Queensland, tracing the Paroo and the Bulloo Rivers to their sources, and in 1861, established Caiwarroo and Eulo stations, and later a pastoral lease of Thargomindah. The town takes its name from a settlement on the Paroo River first appearing on an 1872 map of Queensland map.

The post office opened on 6 September 1872; the first postmaster was the publican William Shearer.

A town reserve was proclaimed in 1874 described as "near the Eulo waterhole".

A police station was established about 1 January 1880.

A Court of Petty Sessions was established on 18 August 1880 and operated until 31 December 1964.

A telegraph office opened in 1881.

By 1883, the Cobb and Co. mail and stage coach would leave Thargomindah on a Wednesday at 1:00 pm to arrive in Hungerford by 6:00 pm Friday; and from there leaving Sunday at 6:00 am, arriving in Eulo at 1:00 pm Monday, and back at Thargomindah by 1:00 pm Tuesday. Stage coach driver Billy Chute (William Tuite) later went on to run the Gladstone Hotel with his wife Margaret. The last Cobb and Co. coach ran in Australia in 1920.

The Eulo Provisional School opened on 7 May 1888. On 1 January 1909 it became the Eulo State School.

Over time, there were a number of public hotels:

- Eulo Hotel (established 1868) with licensee (G)eorge Felix Davies. The name was changed to the Royal Mail Hotel (c. 1888), then the licence went to Richard Robinson and his wife Isabel Gray whence it was renamed as the Empire Hotel in May 1894, before closing in 1898. Frank Hickling was also identified as a proprietor of the Empire in 1896.

A robbery of the Empire Hotel occurred in May 1896 during a ball where the landlord's safe was removed, with over £50 cash and £20 of opals; with the offenders later arrested.

The Empire Hotel was destroyed by fire, "burned to the ground", in January 1911. Made from pise, the mud walls remained long afterwards.

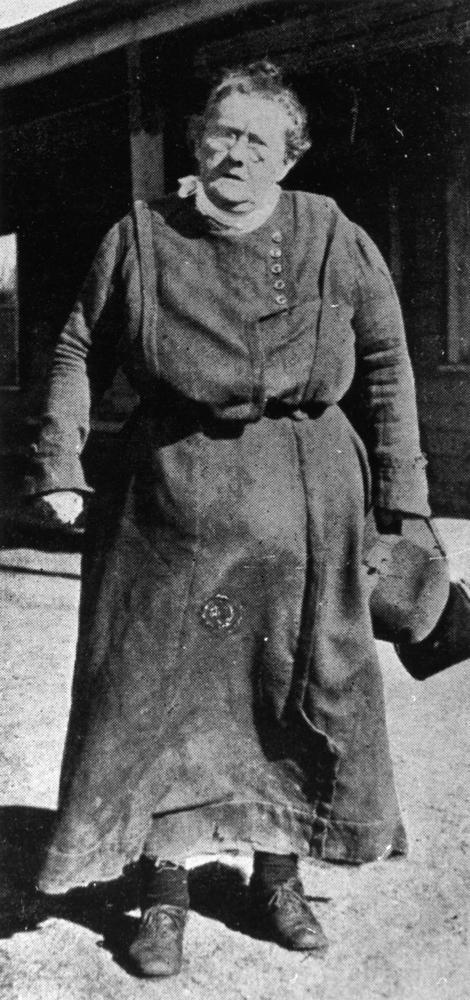
Isabel Gray, the Eulo Queen

- Metropolitan Hotel (established 1888), closed in December 1912, and allegedly destroyed by fire later on.

By 1894 with Robinson at the Royal Mail Hotel, James Wheeler held the licence for the Metropolitan. It was bought in 1912 by Isabel Gray and her husband Richard Robinson. In the same year, the hotel's cook was very successful on a Melbourne Cup sweeps with £1000 (as of 2020, equivalent of A$125,000), such that within a few days she wed one of the "big gun fencers of the district".

- Gladstone Hotel (established 1900). In 1894, the proprietor was James Kearney. Another early licensee was John Frank Hickling (d. December 1898) and his wife Margaret Hickling. Margaret continued on after the death of her husband. William Henry Tuite (c. 1878–1935; also called 'Billy Chute') and Margaret Tuite took over the Gladstone by 1928, where William had been a driver for the Cobb and Co. mail coaches for over 25 years. In March 1937, the licence changed from Margaret Tuite to the gentleman and former manager of Tilboroo Station, Arthur Michael Patch. He sold the hotel in June 1945.

The hotel was destroyed by fire at 0:45 am, Monday, 10 October 1949. It was described as a single-story wooden hotel, "a relic of the days of Cobb and Co." stage coaching. At the time there were twelve boarders and the licensee Mrs V. B. Prow. As the last Eulo hotel, there was no bar for 100 miles (160 km) between Thargomindah and Cunnamulla. As a result in a town with 11 houses and 60 residents, a working bee created a temporary bar within days.

The hotel was rebuilt and renamed as the Eulo Queen Hotel, on Leo Street. Before the Prow licence, the licensee was W. Connolly. At a time, Samuel Lovie was the publican, before moving south in 1958. It was otherwise possibly originally established in 1886.

There was some unfriendly rivalry between the hotels, when in early 1890, Isabel Gray had her substantial liquor holdings (£350; as of 2020, in excess of A$55,000) and furniture seized, upon information supplied by Hickling (formerly of the Gladstone and the Royal Mail), Kearney (of the Gladstone), and one other. She had just purchased the Royal Mail Hotel from merchant R. Burke on 1 September 1889, where the furniture of former licensee Mr Julius was held by a bill-of-sale. Kearney was appointed as a trustee for the possible insolvency of Julius; but had a conflict of interest as a rival to Gray. The matter went before the court, where the confiscation order was annulled.

Circa 1900, Thomas James Cooney (1873–1953) opened a small butchering business in Eulo, having worked the area as a blade shearer involved in the 1894 shearers strike, was an opal gouger, and undertook fence post cutting and kangaroo shooting to make a living. The business and his family expanded, before going onto acquire several large sheep and cattle properties including Goonamurra, and Turn Turn (SW of Eulo).

The telephone exchange opened in 1923.

Saint Francis' Anglican Church was dedicated by Archbishop Reginald Halse on 15 September 1957. Its closure on 12 June 2010 was approved by Archbishop Phillip Aspinall. A former Catholic church of Saint Joseph is beside Saint Francis. The first wedding celebrated at the church was that of the eldest son of butcher-cum-grazier Tom Cooney on 17 March 1929, although that was subject to a decree nisi in October 1937.

The town hosts an old World War II air raid shelter on Leo Street, the town then being a communications link, and on the flight path from Darwin to Melbourne.

The eastern entrance to the town has a statue of a diprotodon.

== Demographics ==
In the 2006 census, the locality of Eulo had a population of 108 people.

In the 2016 census, the locality of Eulo had a population of 95 people.

In the 2021 census, the locality of Eulo had a population of 94 people.

== Heritage listings ==
- 1929 building of Eulo State School

== Facilities ==
Eulo has one public hotel and a small general store as well as fuel service station. The general store and fuel bowsers were destroyed by fire on 25 July 2011, but since rebuilt.

Immediately south of the town is the 2,000 metres (6,600 ft) earthen runway airport (ICAO code YEUO). In 2023, the airstrip became the first Queensland town to test runway emergency lanterns that could be used by the Royal Flying Doctor Service for night-time call-outs.

== Education ==
Eulo State School is a government primary (Early childhood to Year 6) school for boys and girls on the southern corner of Leo Street and Emu Street (28.1575°S 145.0504°E). The enrolments between 2010 and 2012 have ranged from 11 to 16 students. In 2018, the school had an enrolment of 14 students with two teachers and four non-teaching staff (two full-time equivalent). Some students travel up to 130 kilometres (81 mi) each day to attend school, while other students live in the Eulo and District Hostel during the week in order to attend. After completing primary school in Eulo, there are no nearby secondary schools, so most students attend a secondary boarding school in Brisbane or Toowoomba. Distance education is another alternative for secondary education.

== Events ==
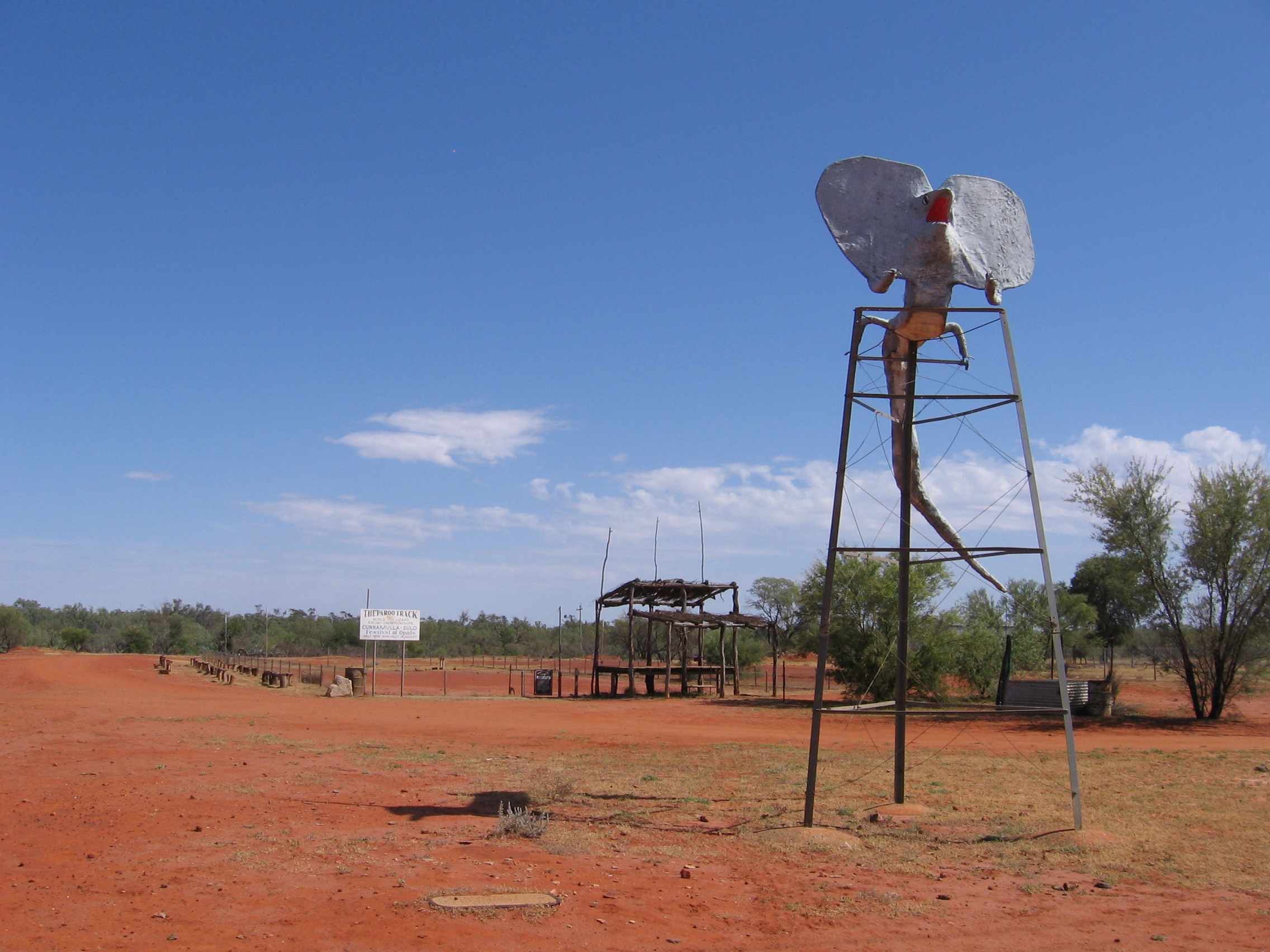
Eulo lizard racing track, 2006

Eulo hosts an annual lizard racing championships on their Paroo Track every August/September, which commenced in 1968, held in conjunction with the Cunnamulla and Eulo Opal Festival.

The Eulo Polocrosse Club has an annual July event, and a motorbike gymkhana and enduro is conducted each Easter.

The town was one of the stops in the March 2023 Shitbox Rally motoring event rally.

== Notable residents ==
- Isabel Gray (better known as the Eulo Queen) was a publican, storekeeper and prostitute

== Gallery ==
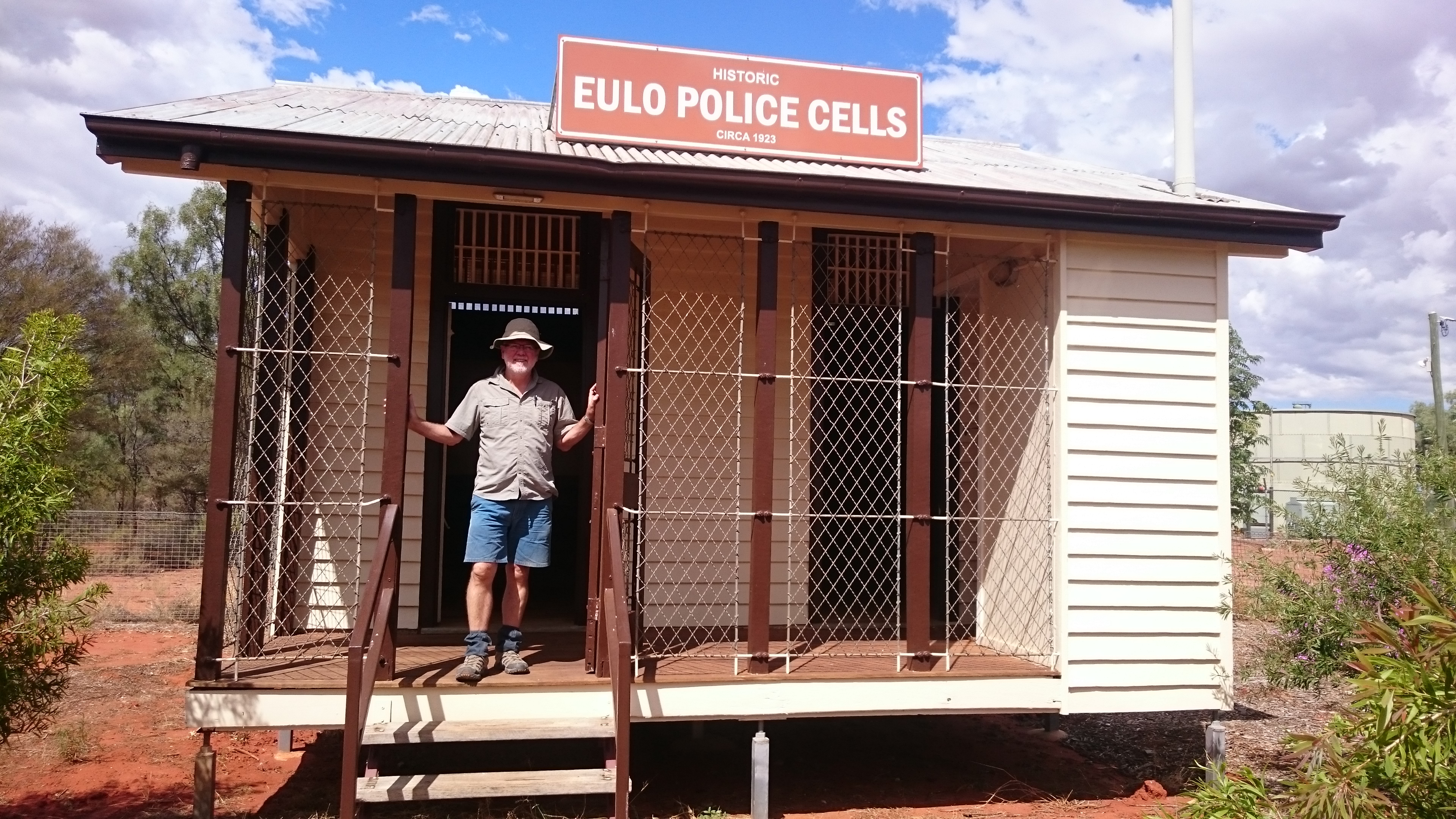
Police cell

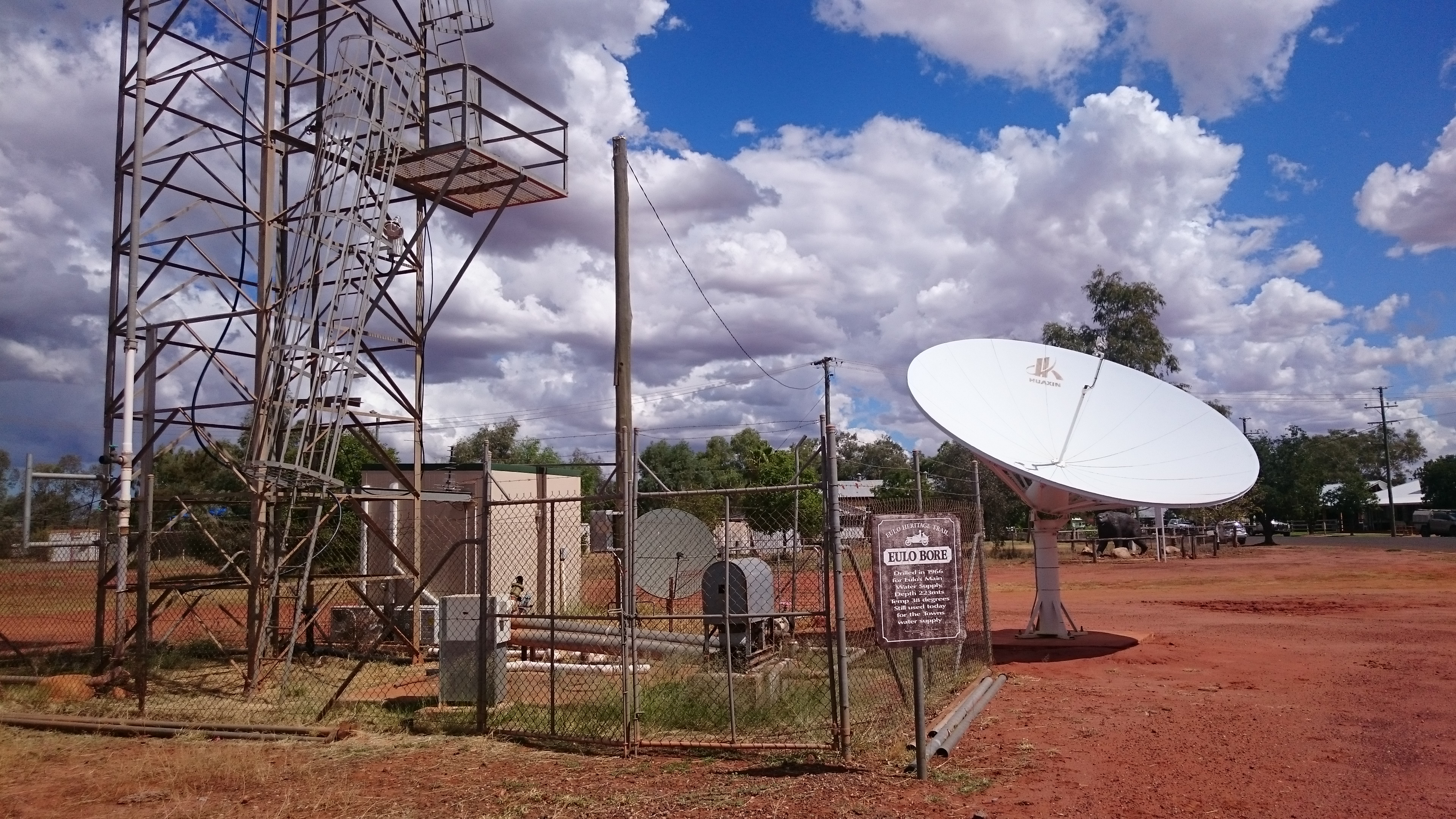
English Bore

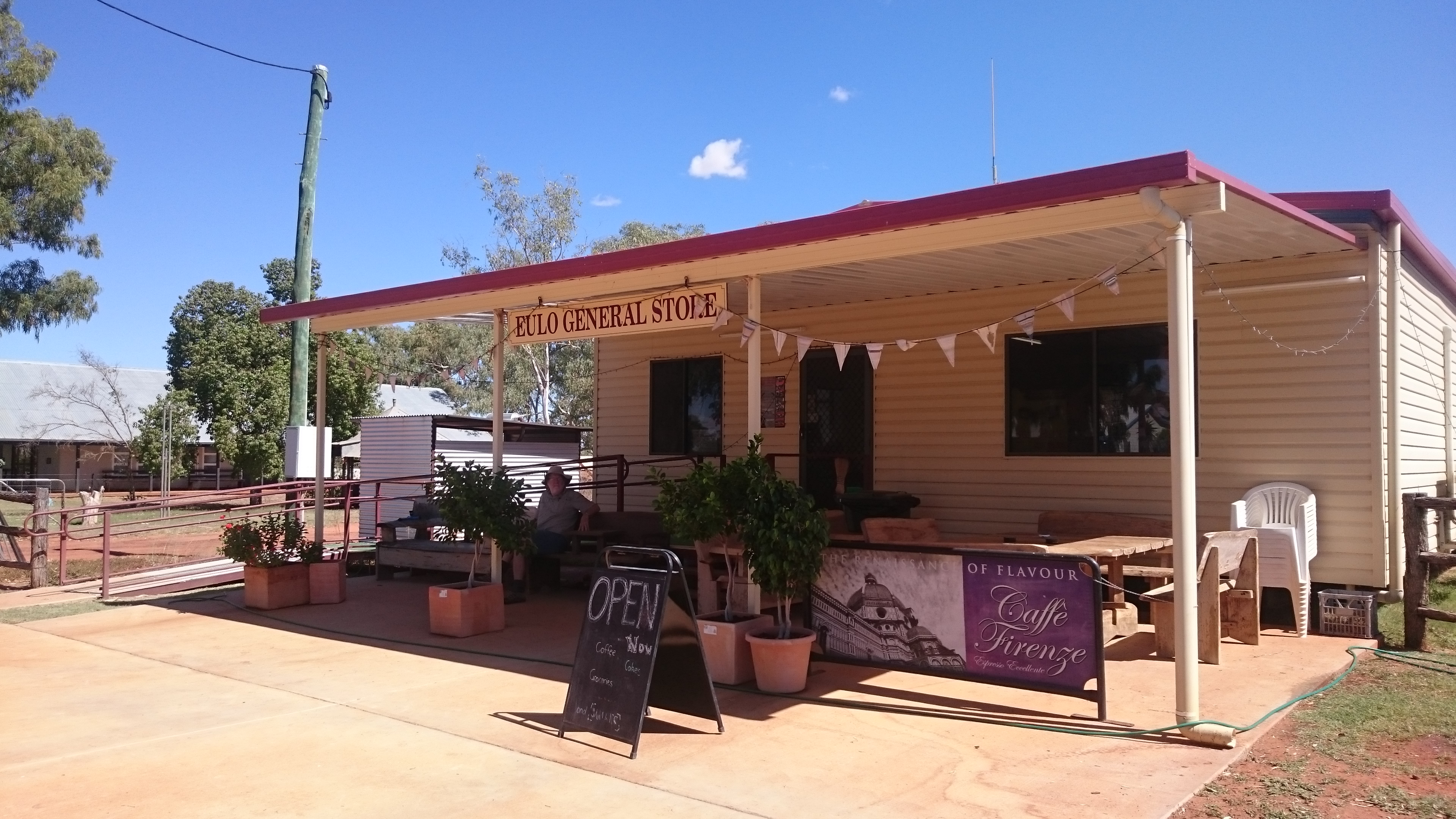
General store

== See also ==
- Yowah nut opals
