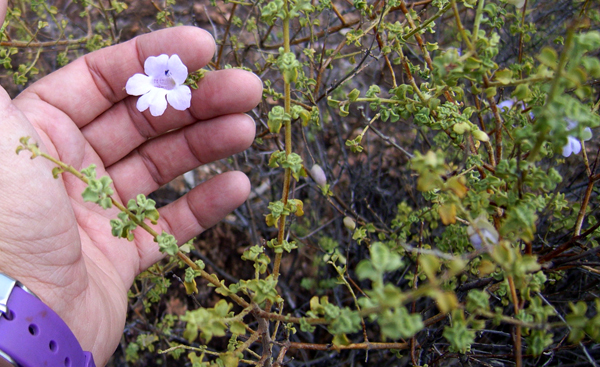

Scientific classification
- Kingdom: Plantae
- Clade: Tracheophytes
- Clade: Angiosperms
- Clade: Eudicots
- Clade: Asterids
- Order: Lamiales
- Family: Lamiaceae
- Genus: Prostanthera
- Species: P. megacalyx

Binomial name
- Prostanthera megacalyx C.T.White & W.D.Francis

= Prostanthera megacalyx =

Species of flowering plant

Prostanthera megacalyx is a species of flowering plant in the family Lamiaceae and is endemic to Queensland. It is a small shrub with pale green leaves and mauve flowers.

== Description ==
Prostanthera megacalyx is a small, stiff, rounded shrub up to 1 m (3 ft 3 in) high with wavy, light green, ovate to nearly disc-shaped leaves. The branchlets and new growth covered with short, pale, stiff glandular hairs. The leaves densely dotted with glands, leathery, almost irregularly disc-shaped, 3–6 mm (0.12–0.24 in) long, 2–4 mm (0.079–0.157 in) wide and tapering to a 1–2 mm (0.039–0.079 in) long petiole. The large mauve to lavender coloured flowers have a prominent calyx and borne singly in upper leaf axils on a pedicel about 1 mm (0.039 in) long. The calyx dotted with small glands at irregular intervals. The corolla violet to purple with soft, short somewhat scattered hairs, floral tube about 1 cm (0.39 in) long with short, purple streaks inside, upper petal broadly egg-shaped, 1.5 cm (0.59 in) long, 1 cm (0.39 in) wide, lower petal about half the size. The upper petal has two short lobes, lower lip deeply lobed and middle lobe rounded, 5 mm (0.20 in) long and 3 mm (0.12 in) wide.

== Taxonomy and naming ==
Prostanthera megacalyx was first formally described in 1926 by Cyril Tenison White and William Douglas Francis and the description was published in Proceedings of the Royal Society of Queensland. The specific epithet (megacalyx) means "large calyx".

== Distribution and habitat ==
This prostanthera grows in barren, dry, rocky sites at Grey Range, Ambethala Range, Eulo and Yowah in Queensland.
