= Koroit opal field =

Coordinates: 27°35′22″S 145°21′31″E

The Koroit opal field is an opal mining area in Paroo Shire in South West Queensland, Australia. It is located about 80 km north northwest of Cunnamulla. It is not a town, nor should it be confused with the town of Koroit in rural western Victoria, Australia. It has neither electricity nor running water. Koroit is close to the town of Yowah which also produces a similar type of opal.

The Koroit opal field is known for the very distinctive type of boulder opal that is found in its mines. In Queensland boulder opal is found within a 300 km wide belt of sedimentary rocks in the Winton Formation. Here opal is found as a kernel in small concretions.

The Koroit Opal field was discovered in 1897 by Lawrence Rostron. The most recent mining events started in 1972 when the popularity and profitability of the stone increased. The mining is done by either open cut large scale mining or by underground shafts.

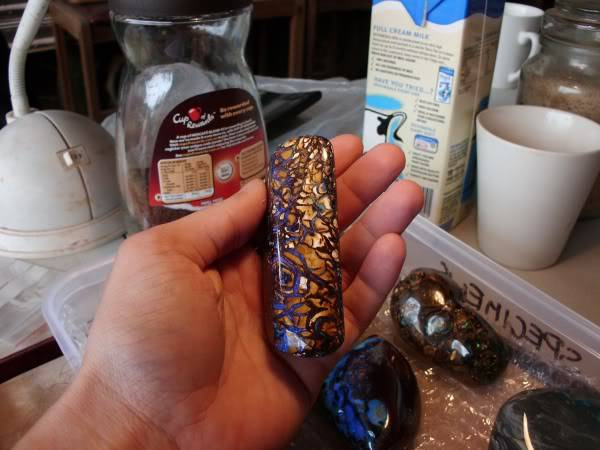
Koroit Boulder Opal from a mining camp in Koroit. The boulder opal is formed from ironstone with a rich opal color running through it.

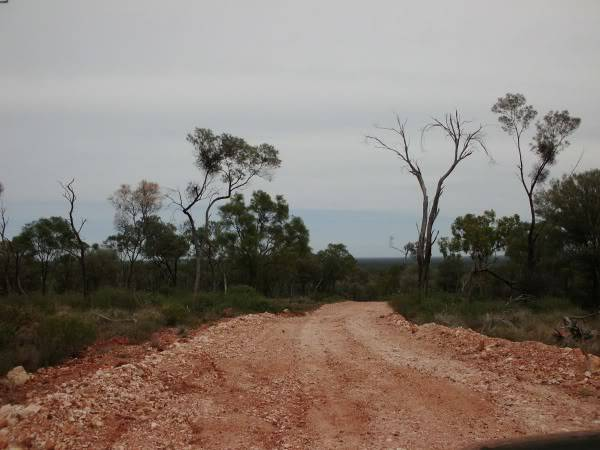
Koroit is in a very remote area of Australia. The roads are often treacherous.

== See also ==
- Mining in Australia
