= Isabel Gray =

Personality (1851–1929), from western Queensland, Australia

Isabel 'Maggie' Gray
- Born: c. 1850; England or Mauritius
- Died: 7 August 1929, aged 79; Toowoomba, Queensland, Australia
- Other name: Eulo Queen
- Occupation: Publican
- Spouse(s): James McIntosh; Richard William Robinson; Herbert Victor Gray
- Parent(s): James Richardson, Priscilla Wright

Isabel Gray (1851–1929) was a publican, storekeeper and prostitute in Eulo, Queensland, Australia. She was considered one of the three wonders of Queensland, along with crack shearer Jackie Howe (1861–1920), and the cook and Barcaldine hotelier Jimmy Ah Foo.

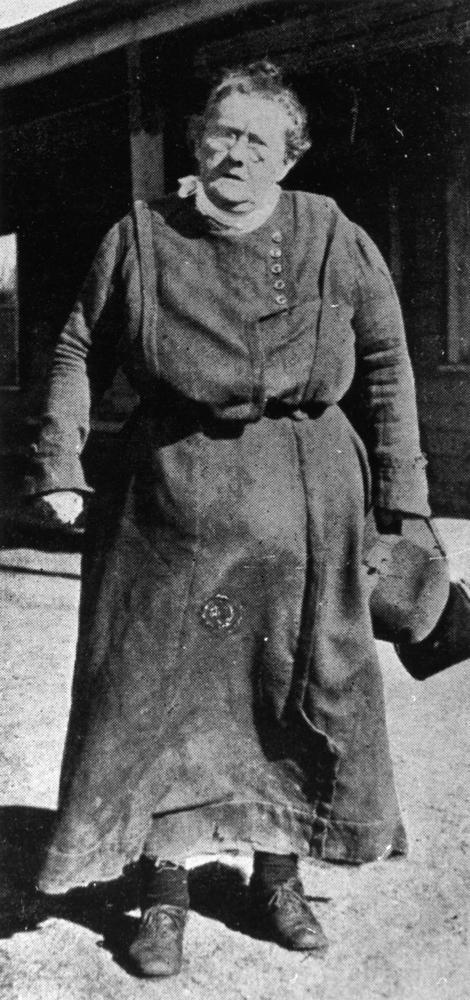
Isabel Gray, the Eulo Queen, later in life

== Early life ==
Born Richardson, she was born c. 1851 in either England or Mauritius. It is believed she may have had a daughter who died young, and spoke French and German fluently.

== Careers ==
Gray came to Australia some time before 1869, when she married James McIntosh in Warialda. He died shortly afterwards and two years later she married Richard William Robinson, a station manager from Surat. They moved to Eulo where they ran hotels, stores and a butcher and in 1889 Robinson bought the Royal Mail Hotel. It was from her taste in jewellery, and the local Yowah opals, she earned her nickname. Gray was given to be quite witty, vivacious, and a striking blonde with green eyes.

The start of 1890 saw Gray facing court for "sly grog selling", and found guilty on at least one.

In April 1892, police objected to the renewal of Gray's liquor licence "on the ground that immorality was practised on the premises".

August 1892 saw her before the Supreme Court in the matter of Robinson v. Fraser, with a conflict over a seven-year lease of the Royal Mail Hotel drawn by her, where the defendant James S. Fraser stated the conditions were not satisfactory. By October 1892, Gray had separately leased the Metropolitan Hotel, which also involved a seizure of £120 representing '2 tons of spirituous liquors' (as of 2020, more than A$18,900).

In 1892, Gray and her husband were charged with a variety of offences, including disorderly conduct, assaulting the police, purchasing a sheep illegally, and passing a dishonoured cheque. In response, she sued the police for assault, false imprisonment and malicious prosecution, and was successful. By this time she was already known as the "Queen of Eulo".

By 1900 Gray bought the Empire Hotel; which was 'burned to the ground' in January 1911.

Her husband Richard 'Dick' Robinson died in 1902.

She married her third husband, Herbert Victor Gray in 1903, where in November 1904 he was charged with bigamy. Isabel Gray provided a surety of £100 (as of 2020, equivalent to A$16,050). Stating he did not know his wife was still alive, and with no further police evidence, he was discharged. At a time, she laid charges against him and he served a term of imprisonment. Herbert Gray enlisted for World War I, but died in camp.

In February 1897 as Isabella Robinson, she took over the lease of the Hotel Metropole, Queen Street, Brisbane, her inaugural appearance causing traffic to come to a halt "ahead of her fame".

On 6 March 1903, forty-year-old servant Mary Hearn "mysteriously disappeared from Mrs. Robinson's hotel, better known as the Eulo Queen", for her body to be located 8 miles (13 km) from town where foul play had been suggested. Whilst called a mystery, it was just considered Hearn had wandered away and perished. Whilst not implicated at the time, some considered this mystery supported the suggestion Robinson was not a fit and proper person to hold a liquor licence.

In 1912 she brought Eulo's Metropolitan Hotel, until World War I saw her fortunes decline. The Royal Mail Hotel burned down, but had been made from pise, and the mud walls remained long afterwards.

In December 1912 Gray was found guilty of involving the improper trade of liquor, her fourth in as many months; the court also recommending the cancellation of her licence for the Metropolitan Hotel to be cancelled. In 1916 she pleaded guilty to sly grog selling. It was in an adjournment on her feeling ill, she used a razor to lacerate her abdomen and had to be restrained.

(In October 1949, one of her hotels was destroyed by fire, given to be a single-story wooden hotel, "a relic of the days of Cobb and Co.".)

== Later years ==
Gray left Eulo as an alcoholic in 1922 after an attempted suicide, and died in a Toowoomba mental facility in 1929, aged 79. She died penniless, and with hardly a mention.

She was described as always being a "very kind hearted woman".

== Legacy ==
In June 1930, an unattributed five-stanza long poem was penned her name, The Eulo Queen, and a six-stanza poem in August 1932 of the same name by E. S. Sorenson, a prolific writer of Australian literature.

It is said Gray found a black opal near the site of one of her hotels, later called the "Eulo Queen" and valued at many hundred of pounds, was given by Gray to the King George V; and that the opal is included in the Crown jewels.

A plaque and stone commemorates the Eulo Queen, in Eulo.

The remaining hotel in the town has been named the "Eulo Queen Hotel".
