= Mary Howe (disambiguation) =

Mary Howe may refer to:

- Mary Howe (1882–1964), American composer and pianist
- Mary Howe (soprano) (1870–1952), American singer
- Mary Washington Howe (1852–1900), American educator
