= Alfred Howe =

Alfred Augustus Howe (December 29, 1817 – October 6, 1892) was an American carpenter and politician in North Carolina. He served as an alderman in Wilmington, North Carolina and as a county commissioner. He was African American.

== Biography ==
Alfred Augustus Howe was born in Wilmington, North Carolina on December 29, 1817. He was the seventh child of Anthony Walker and Tenah Howe. His father was sold into slavery, and both of his parents were slaves owned by Robert Howe.

He and his brother Anthony became carpenters and purchased their freedom while young. They were both listed in the census as being free in 1860.

In 1840, Howe married Mary Moore Walker. They had six children together: Rebecca Jane, Alfred Washington, Mary Washington, Isabella L., Alfred Preach, and John Thomas. Their son, John Thomas Howe, later became a North Carolina state legislator.

Both him and his brother Anthony worked as carpenters before the American Civil War began, and lived next door to one another. The Howe family owned a block of buildings and households by at least the 1880s, where they lived and held their workshops.

In 1869, Howe was on the Wilmington Board of Alderman and was the superintendent of multiple construction projects across the city. He worked on construction in various government buildings, including City Hall's courtroom and the city's jailhouse. Howe built the Mary Jane Langdon House, an Italianate-styled building finished in 1870. In 1877, he built the William B. McKoy House, a Queen Anne and Stick style building, designed using a previously published plan that was adapted by architect James F. Post.

Howe was an active member of St. Mark’s Episcopal Church in Wilmington, and was a vestryman and senior warden of the church.

In July 1892, Howe and a white trolley motorman known as Kelly got into an argument. Kelly attacked Howe and hit him in the head with a brass motor crank. From that point until his death three months later, he was unable to leave his home due to his injuries. His obituary in the Wilmington Messenger noted he left his house only once after being injured, to attend a hearing for the case against Kelly.

Howe died on October 6, 1892, at the age of 75. A court solicitor called for a post mortem examination of Howe's body; the doctors concluded the immediate cause of death as tuberculosis effecting both lungs. A funeral for Howe was held at St. Mark’s Episcopal Church, and he was buried at Pine Forest Cemetery in Wilmington, North Carolina.

After his death the Wilmington Messenger reported he had amassed a fortune of about $25,000 or $30,000. Howe's home is extant. A letter written vouching for him is also extant.
