= Shitbox Rally =

Fundraising motor vehicle event in Australia

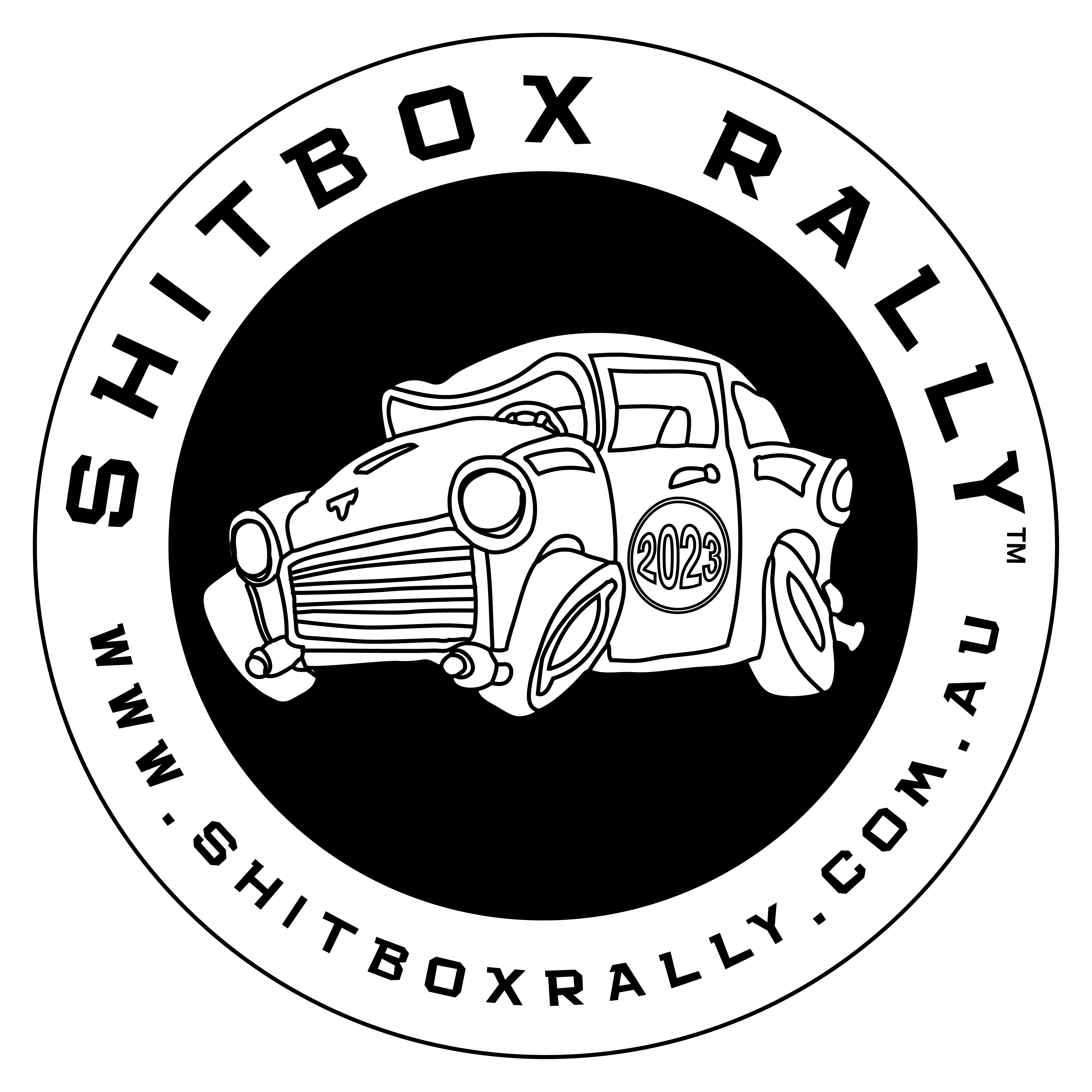
Shitbox Rally 2023 Logo

The Shitbox Rally is a long-distance motoring event run in Australia as a fundraiser for cancer research, originally an annual event but increased to bi-yearly in 2019.

Box Rallies have since expanded their fundraising events to three Shitbox Rally's annually, and added two new iterations, Mystery Box Rally and Lunchbox Rally.

== History ==
Shitbox Rally was founded by James Freeman in 2009. He secured an agreement from Cancer Council Australia to lend its name to the project, on the provision that all profits would be directed to Cancer Council Australia. Freeman estimated a profit of $20,000 in the first year and to get the ball rolling, he canvassed friends and relations to take part.

The Sydney Morning Herald 's Drive column, Seven Network 's Sunrise program and Unique Cars magazine ran feature stories, and other print and electronic media followed. Triple J arranged for one of their presenters, Tom Tilley, to participate, sending reports back to Sydney, and capturing moments on videotape. 23 two-person teams registered for the event, which raised $104,000, well above the most optimistic predictions.

== The event ==
Effectively, a team of two needs to raise a minimum of $5,000 to participate in the rally. The only stipulations for the car are that it is worth/valued at no more than A$1,500 and that it's not an AWD/4WD vehicle. Costs of vehicle registration and roadworthiness checks are not included in the budget, nor are some safety items.

At post-event celebrations there are awards presented to the biggest fundraisers, and other awards are given in various light-hearted categories which may change at the whim of the organisers: "Least likely to make it"; "Best car"; "Best team theme" (dressing up the vehicle is part of the fun, but not mandatory); "Best breakdown"; "Best repair"; "Spirit of the Rally".

== Events ==
Start	From	via	Finish	At	Raised
14 August 2026	Adelaide	Parachilna, William Creek, Mount Dare, Alice Springs, Daly Waters, Timber Creek	22 August 2026	Darwin	TBA
19 June 2026	Mildura	Hawker, Mungerannie, Bedourie, McKinlay, Karumba, Chillagoe	27 June 2026	Townsville	TBA
1 May 2026	Port Douglas	Oasis Roadhouse, Aramac, Toompine, Louth, Narrandera, Dargo	9 May 2026	Melbourne	TBA
24 October 2025	Alice Springs	Yulara, Oodnadatta, Copley, Silverton, Bourke, Nindigully	1 November 2025	Gold Coast	$2.58 million
19 June 2025	Perth	Murchison, Mount Augustus, Auski Roadhouse, Pardoo Roadhouse, Derby, Home Valley, Victoria River	28 June 2025	Darwin	$2.8 million
2 May 2025	Canberra	Hay, Silverton, Bourke, Mitchell, Barcaldine, Hughenden	10 May 2025	Townsville	$2.38 million
18 October 2024	Bendigo	Pooncarie, Milparinka, Innamincka, Betoota, Isisford, Belyando Crossing	26 October 2024	Townsville	$2.39 million
14 June 2024	Melbourne	Hay, Silverton, Tibooburra, Windorah, Bedourie, Tobermory	22 June 2024	Alice Springs	
12 April 2024	Adelaide	Roxby Downs, Oodnadatta, Yulara, Coober Pedy, Penong, Caiguna, Southern Cross	20 April 2024	Perth	$3 million
13 October 2023	Port Douglas	Einasleigh, Winton, Windorah, Birdsville, Marree, Rawnsley Park	21 October 2023	Adelaide	$2.44 million
12 May 2023	Newcastle	Nyngan, Packsaddle, Innamincka, Betoota, Yaraka, Hughenden	20 May 2023	Townsville	$2.31 million
18 March 2023	Rockhampton	Tambo, Eulo, Cobar, Tooleybuc, Spirit of Tasmania, Strahan	24 March 2023	Hobart	$2.14 million
15 October 2022	Mackay	Charters Towers, Chillagoe, Normanton, Hells Gate Roadhouse, Borroloola, Mataranka	21 October 2022	Darwin	
7 May 2022	Wollongong	Trundle, Glengarry Hilton, Tibooburra, Thargomindah, Windorah, Aramac	13 May 2022	Mackay	$2.21 million
26 March 2022	Hay	Silverton, Cameron Corner, Arkaroola, William Creek, Kingoonya, Kimba	1 April 2022	Adelaide	$2.1 million
22 May 2021	Alice Springs	Barkly Homestead, Hells Gate Roadhouse, Karumba, Kynuna, Alpha, Taroom	28 May 2021	Gold Coast	$2.97 million
19 October 2019	Melbourne	Wentworth, White Cliffs, Noccundra, Birdsville, Jundah, Hughenden	25 October 2019	Townsville	$2.36 million
8 May 2019	Perth	Kalgoorlie, Tjukayirla, Warakurna, Uluru, Oodnadatta, Copley, Cameron Corner, Louth, Cudgegong	17 May 2019	Sydney	
19 May 2018	Brisbane	Mitchell, Yaraka, Middleton, Camooweal, Mataranka	25 May 2018	Darwin	$1.97 million
27 May 2017	Adelaide	Roxby Downs, Oodnadatta, Alice Springs, Tobermorey Station, Einasleigh	2 June 2017	Cairns	$1.67 million
7 May 2016	Mackay	Blackall, Thargomindah, Tilpa, Cootamundra, Dargo, Melbourne, Devonport	13 May 2016	Hobart	$1.53 million
9 May 2015	Canberra	Hay, Silverton, Marree, Birdsville, Boulia, Hughenden	15 May 2015	Townsville	
31 May 2014	Perth	Meekatharra Marble Bar Broome Fitzroy Crossing Mount Barnett Victoria River	6 June 2014	Darwin	
4 May 2013	Adelaide	Coober Pedy, Uluru, Warakurna, Tjukayirla, Laverton, Kalgoorlie	10 May 2013	Fremantle	
14 April 2012	Melbourne	Wentworth, Tibooburra, Innamincka, Windorah, Winton, Undara	21 April 2012	Cairns	
21 May 2011	Brisbane	Mitchell, Longreach, Gregory, Savannah Way, Hells Gate, Lorella Springs, Katherine, Jabiru	27 May 2011	Darwin	$690,000
20 March 2010	Sydney	Nyngan, Copley, Silverton, Broken Hill, Copley, Oodnadatta, William Creek, Arckaringa, Yulara	27 March 2010	Alice Springs	$103,000

== Gallery ==
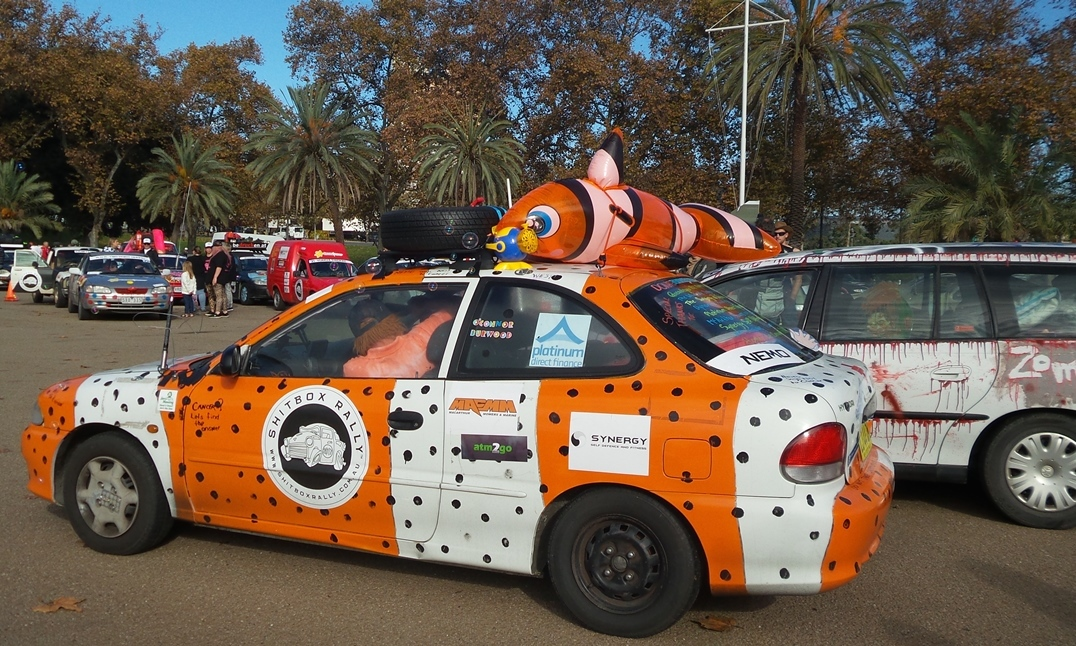
Adelaide, May 2017

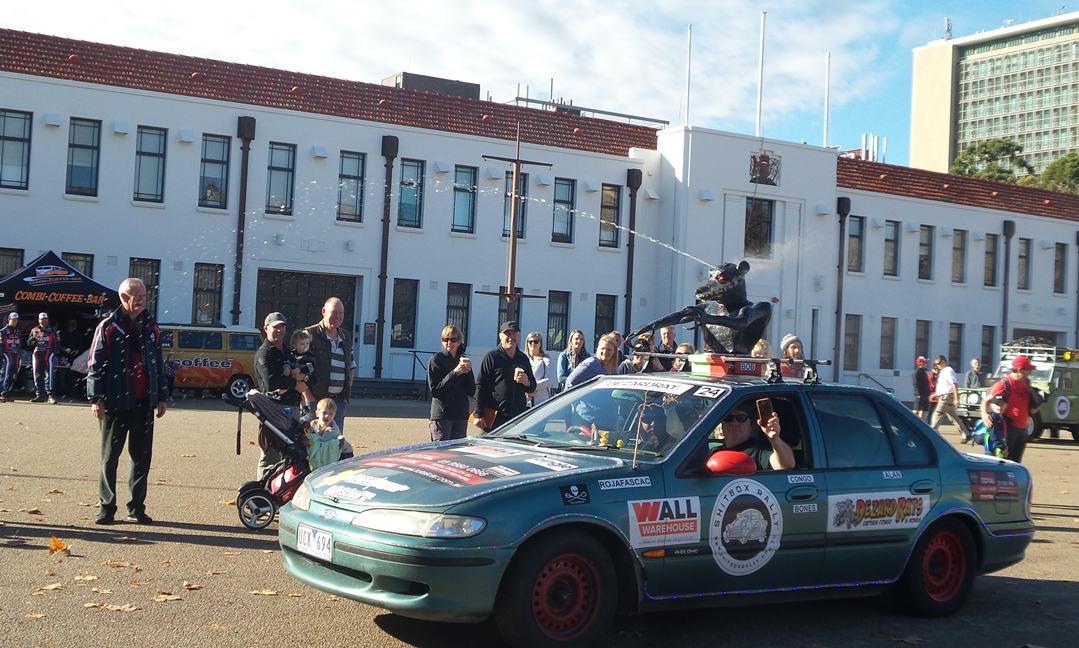
Adelaide, May 2017

== See also ==
- 24 Hours of Lemons
- Gambler 500
