= Shire of Paroo =

Coordinates: 28°04′00″S 145°41′00″E

- Local government area
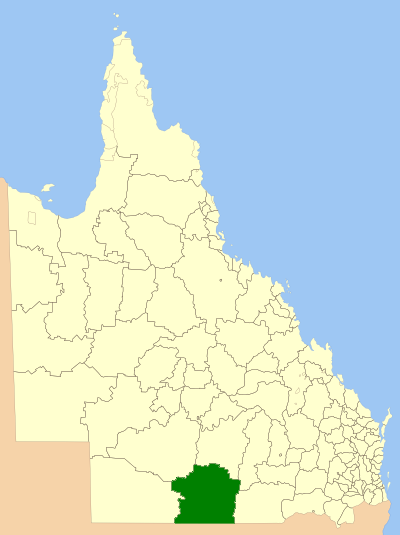
- Location in Queensland

- Interactive map of Shire of Paroo
- Country: Australia
- State: Queensland
- Established: 1879
- Council seat: Cunnamulla

Government
  - Mayor: Suzette Catherine Beresford
  - State electorate: Warrego
  - Federal division: Maranoa

Area
  - Total: 47,623 km^{2} (18,387 sq mi)

Population
  - Total: 1,679 (2021 census)
  - Density: 0.035256/km^{2} (0.091313/sq mi)
- Website: Shire of Paroo
LGAs around Shire of Paroo
Quilpie	Murweh	Maranoa
Bulloo	Shire of Paroo	Balonne
Far West (NSW)	Bourke (NSW)	Brewarrina (NSW)

The Shire of Paroo is a local government area in South West Queensland, Australia. The administrative centre is the town of Cunnamulla. The Paroo Shire covers an area of 47,623 square kilometres (18,387 sq mi). In the 2021 census, the Shire of Paroo had a population of 1,679 people.

== Geography ==
The region incorporates the towns of Cunnamulla, Yowah, Eulo and Wyandra, with Cunnamulla being the hub of the Shire and is centrally situated on the crossroads of the Balonne and Mitchell Highways. Cunnamulla, meaning "long stretch of water", gets its name from the Warrego River which flows past the town. The Paroo Shire is bounded by the Open Mitchell Grass Flood Plains in the East to the Yowah opal fields where the Yowah nut is found and the Mulga lands to the West.

Main industries within the Shire are beef, goat, fat lamb, wool, opal mining and tourism. Located in a semi-arid zone, the region has temperatures in summer ranging from 15 degrees to 37 degrees Celsius and winter temperature ranges from 2 to 25 degrees Celsius.

== History ==
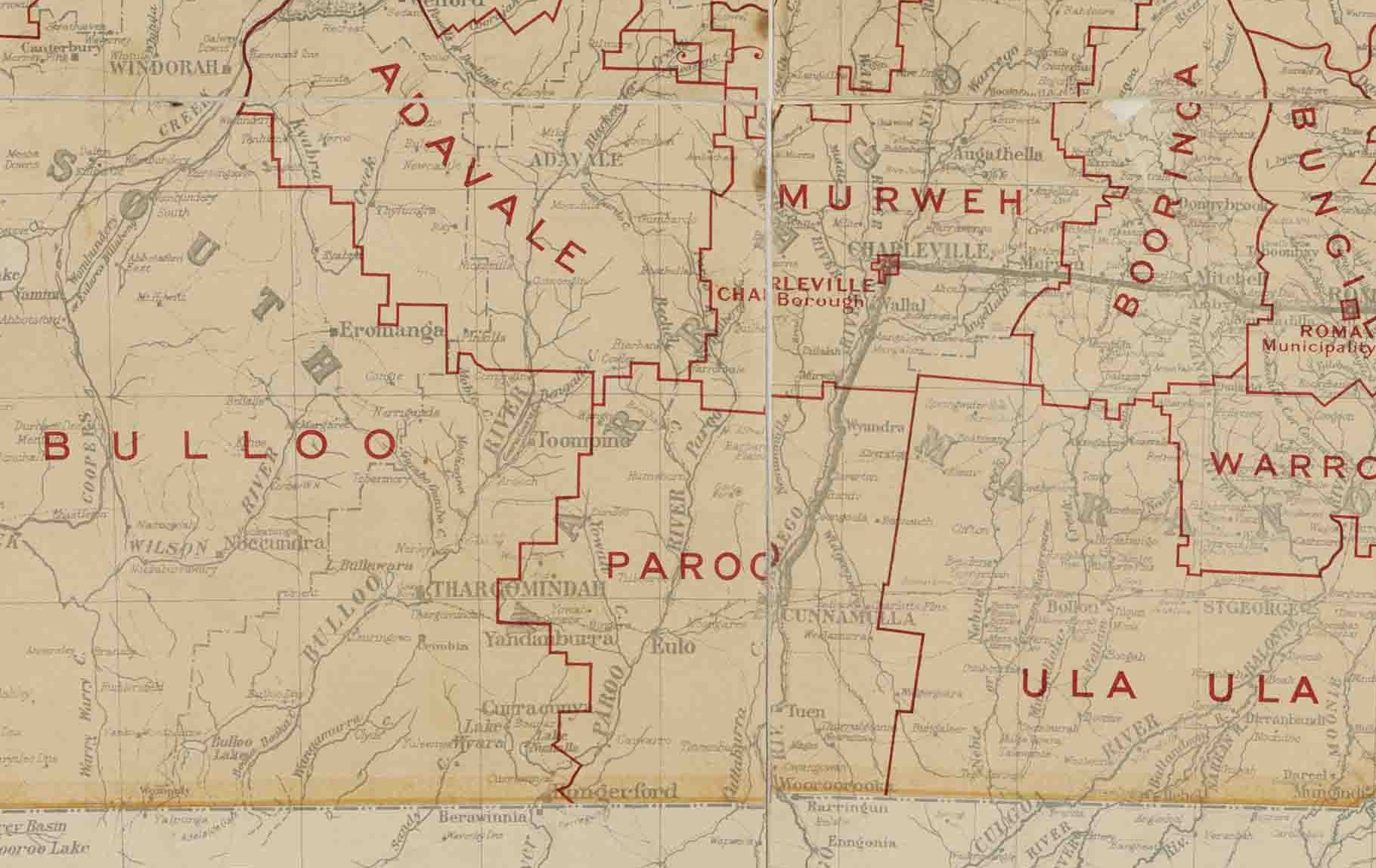
Map of Paroo Division and adjacent local government areas, March 1902

Gunya (Kunya, Kunja, Kurnja) is an Australian Aboriginal language spoken by the Gunya people. The Gunya language region includes the landscape within the local government boundaries of the Paroo Shire Council, taking in Cunnamulla and extending north towards Augathella, east towards Bollon and west towards Thargomindah.

Paroo Division was established on 11 November 1879 as one of the original divisions proclaimed under the Divisional Boards Act 1879 with a population of 799.

On 3 June 1880, the western part of the Paroo Division was separated to create the Bulloo Division.

With the passage of the Local Authorities Act 1902, Paroo Division became the Shire of Paroo on 31 March 1903.

In 1924, a new shire hall was being built, but it was wrecked in a violent dust storm on 5 February. However, they were able to straighten and strengthen the building and it was finally opened on 6 December 1924 by the Minister for Public Instruction, Frank Brennan. In 2018, an inspection revealed the foundations of the building had shifted and the building was unsafe; it was demolished in 2019. In 2020, construction commenced on a new civic centre, which was officially opened on 28 April 2021 by the Queensland Deputy General for Local Government, Natalie Wilde, and Paroo Shire Mayor, Suzette Beresford.

== Towns and localities ==
The Shire of Paroo includes the following settlements:

- Barringun
- Cunnamulla
- Coongoola
- Eulo
- Humeburn
- Tuen
- Wyandra
- Yowah

== Amenities ==
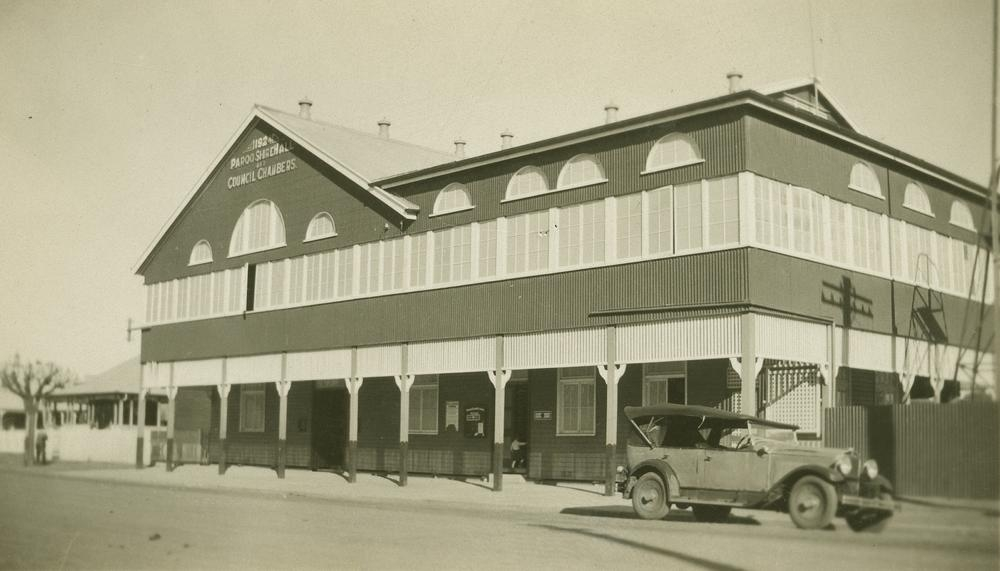
Paroo Shire Hall and Council Chambers, Cunnamulla, circa 1930

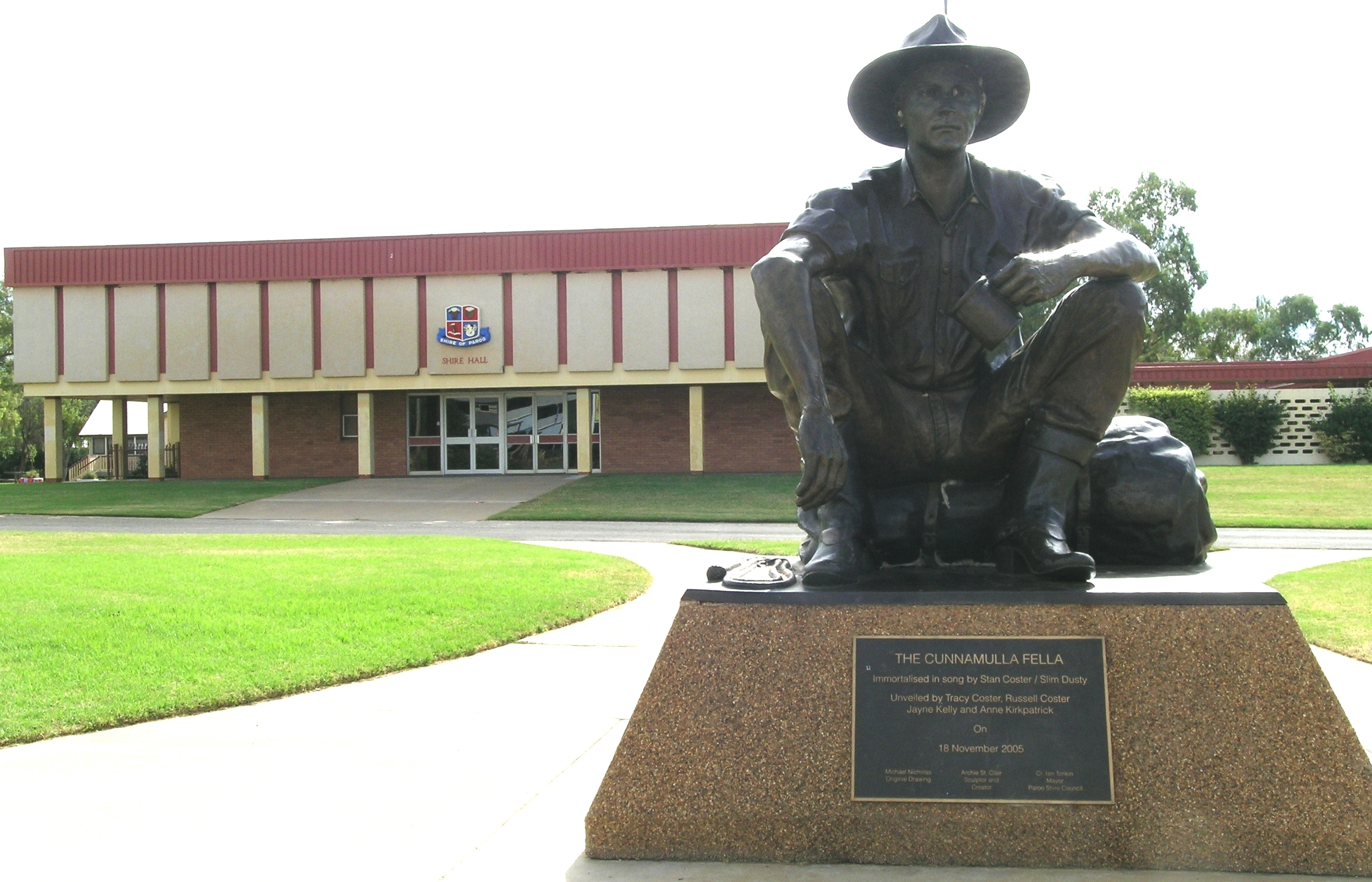
The previous Paroo Shire Hall with statue of the Cunnamulla Fella (from the Stan Coster song famously performed by Slim Dusty) in the foreground

The Paroo Shire Council Civic Centre is located on the corner of Stockyard Street and Louise Street in Cunnamulla.

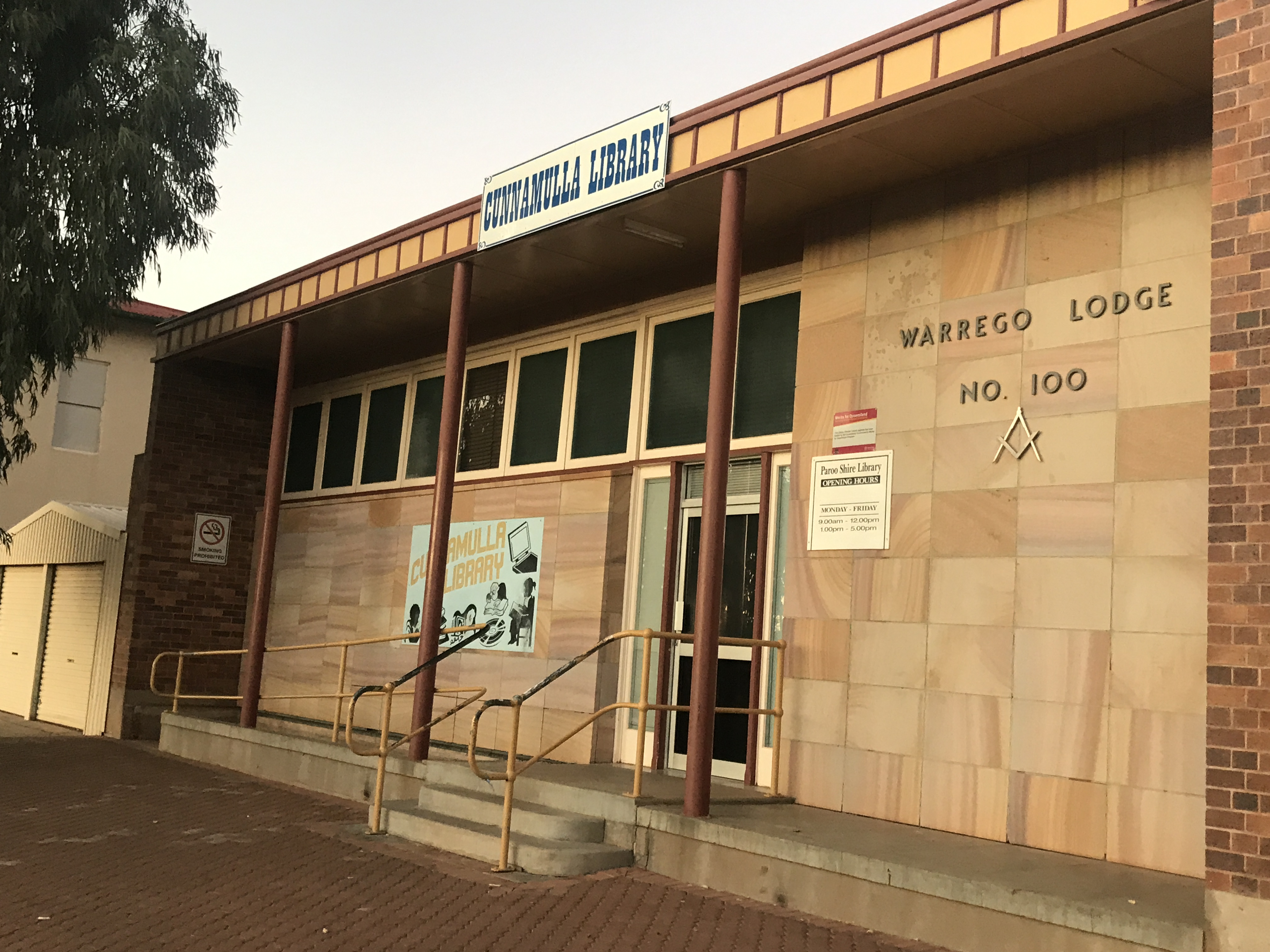
Cunnamulla library, 2019

Paroo Shire Council operates public libraries at Cunnamulla, Wyandra and Yowah.

== Demographics ==
Year	Population	Notes
1933	3,505	
1947	3,165	
1954	4,143	
1961	4,099	
1966	3,600	
1971	3,310	
1976	3,021	
1981	2,691	
1986	2,733	
1991	2,733	
1996	2,432	
2001	2,299	
2006	1,928	
2011	1,857	
2016	1,640	
2021	1,679	

== Chairmen and mayors ==
- 1907: William Duncan Rankin
- 1924: Mr Mackay
- 1927: John Henry Kerr
- 1952: Jack Tonkin
- 1965–1988: Darby Land
- 2006: Ian Tonkin
- 2008–2012: Jo Sheppard
- 2012–2020: Lindsay Godfrey
- 2020–present: Suzette Catherine Beresford

== See also ==
- Koroit opal field
- Cunnamulla Fella
- Darby McCarthy
