= Lethia Sherman Hankins =

American politician (1934–2014)

Lethia Sherman Hankins (January 2, 1934 – December 29, 2014) was an educator, civic leader, and politician who was active in Wilmington, North Carolina. In 2005 she received national award from the YWCA, the Dorothy I. Height Racial Justice Award, and in 2020 her portrait was one of five commissioned to hang in Bellamy Mansion in honor of North Carolinian women who impacted women, as part of the centennial celebrations of the League of Women Voters for the ratification of the 19th Amendment.

== Early life and education ==
Lethia Mae Sherman was born on January 2, 1934, in Georgetown, South Carolina, the daughter of Mary (née Flowers) and Benjamin Sherman. The family moved to Wilmington, North Carolina shortly after her birth. Sherman was an only child, and the first of her family to go to college. She told Wilma magazine in May 2003, "My parents were not educated but believed if I could get this thing called and education, I could really do something." Sherman was a graduate of New Hanover County schools. Completing secondary school at Williston Industrial High in 1951, she then went to the historically black college and university, North Carolina A&T. She married Harry Leon Hankins in 1957 in South Carolina; the couple divorced in 1987.

== Career ==
After completing her university studies, Hankins taught briefly in Hillsborough before returning to Wilmington, where she began teaching English at Williston Senior High School in 1959. At the time Hankins began teaching at Williston, it was not integrated, but during the desegregation debates in 1968, it was decided that Williston would close in 1968. Hankins transferred to John T. Hoggard High School at that time and organized Speak Outs to defuse the racial tensions that led to incidents like the Wilmington Ten arrests.

Hankins later taught at Emsley A. Laney High School before retiring from teaching in 1994 to seek elected office. She unsuccessfully ran for the New Hanover County Board of Education in 2000. She ran for city council in 2003. She was elected in November 2003 to the Wilmington city council, in a run-off election. Her election was seen by the local paper as "an encouraging sign of racial reconciliation" since the majority of the electorate was white, and her opponent was too. She served until 2007.

== Activism and civic engagement ==
Hankins was a member of the 1898 Foundation, and served as its co-chair in 2003. The 1898 Foundation grew out of community efforts to memorialize the Wilmington massacre. She served on the New Hanover County Human Relations Commission and was chair in 2003. New Hanover County library, She was the a trustee with Cape Fear Community College. Hankins also served on the Wilmington Housing Authority Board of Commissioners and was chair of that board when she stepped down in 2010. YWCA board, Thalian Hall Center for the performing arts board of Trustees, the city of Wilmington's Commission on African American History. She was a member of Cape Fear Museum Associates Board, and the local chapter of the NAACP. Member of the First Baptist Missionary Church. In 2005, Ms. Hankins won a national YWCA Dorothy I. Height Racial Justice Award for her "outstanding contributions towards racial justice." The nomination stated: "During the height of the turmoil caused by the integration of our schools in 1968, Ms. Hankins was always able to reason with her students and convey to them confidence that integration could and would be harmonious".

== Personal life ==
The Hankins had three children, Angela Jannette Hankins (who is married to Reverend Owen E. Metts, Sr.), Harry Benjamin Hankins, and Anita Hankins Galloway. Hankins also raised a nephew, Derry Flowers.

Hankins was a member of the Wilmington Alpha Kappa Alpha chapter. According to a Sunday Star-News article from February 18, 2001, Hankins said she joined in 1972. She was quoted as saying "I started pledging at North Carolina A&T, but wasn't able to finish.." because the funds were too hard to raise.

Hankins died on December 29, 2014.

== Legacy ==
The Cape Fear Museum of History and Science featured Hankins in its This Month in Women's History. It acquired some of her possessions as part of its permanent collection in 2016, including a teal suit, a nameplate from City Council meetings, photographs, campaign materials and programs from her funeral. In 2020, to commemorate the centennial of the ratification of the 19th Amendment, the League of Women Voters of the Lower Cape Fear selected Hankins to be one of the five North Carolinian women whose portraits would be hung in the Bellamy Mansion for their actions as mentors and role models to other women. The works were commissioned from artist Livy Hitchcock, but their unveiling was postponed because of the COVID pandemic and the event was rescheduled for the fall of 2021.
