= Sam Bowens =

American baseball player (1938–2003)

- Outfielder
- Born: March 23, 1938; Wilmington, North Carolina, U.S.
- Died: March 28, 2003 (aged 65); Wilmington, North Carolina, U.S.
- Batted: Right Threw: Right

MLB debut
- September 7, 1963, for the Baltimore Orioles

Last MLB appearance
- July 26, 1969, for the Washington Senators

MLB statistics
- Batting average: .223
- Home runs: 45
- Runs batted in: 143
- Stats at Baseball Reference

Teams
- Baltimore Orioles (1963–1967); Washington Senators (1968–1969)

Samuel Edward Bowens (March 23, 1938 – March 28, 2003) was an American outfielder in Major League Baseball who played for the Baltimore Orioles (1963–1967) and Washington Senators (1968–1969). Bowens batted and threw right-handed. He was born in Wilmington, North Carolina. During his playing career he was considered to have one of the strongest throwing arms in the league, however knee injuries and drinking problems cut his career short. He was named "one of the nicest people I have ever met" by former teammate Wally Bunker.

== Early career ==
Bowens played four sports at Williston High School in Wilmington. He received a $5,000 signing bonus from the Orioles and started his minor league baseball career with the Bluefield Orioles of the Appalachian League and the Leesburg Orioles of the Florida State League in 1960.

== Major League Baseball ==
In 1963, Bowens appeared in 15 games, batting .333 with one home run and nine runs batted in. In his first full year, 1964, Bowens batted .263, with 22 home runs, 71 RBI, 58 runs, 132 hits, 25 doubles, in 139 games. His playing time declined however, because of injuries, an alcohol addiction, and the blossoming of 1965 American League Rookie of the Year Curt Blefary. In 1965 he appeared in 84 games, batting only .163 with seven home runs and 20 runs batted in. He hit over .200 only once more in his career, in 1966 when he hit .210 in 89 games while he was hit by a pitch five times, finishing tenth in the league. He was a member of the 1966 World Series champion Orioles, but he didn't appear in a game. His World Series ring was allegedly stolen from a hotel room a year later. He later described his career with the Orioles as "wasted years".

After the 1967 season, his contract was purchased by the Washington Senators, where he finished his career with batting averages of .191 and .193 in 1968 and 1969.

In a seven-season career, Bowens posted a .223 batting average with 45 home runs and 143 RBI in 479 games.

== Later life ==
Bowens had three children and lived in Indianapolis before moving back to Wilmington in the mid 1980s. He spent his final year in a nursing home in Wilmington, where he died, at the age of 65.
