= Humeburn, Queensland =

Humeburn
- Suburb
- Interactive map of Humeburn
- Coordinates: 27.4122°S 145.2780°E
- Country: Australia
- State: Queensland
- LGA: Shire of Paroo
- Location: 105 km (65 mi) NW of Cunnamulla; 205 km (127 mi) SW of Charleville; 398 km (247 mi) WNW of St George; 471 km (293 mi) WSW of Roma; 955 km (593 mi) W of Brisbane

Government
  - State electorate: Warrego
  - Federal division: Maranoa

Area
  - Total: 4,363.0 km^{2} (1,684.6 sq mi)

Population
  - Total: 9 (2021 census)
  - Density: 0.00206/km^{2} (0.00534/sq mi)
- Time zone: UTC+10:00 (AEST)
- Postcode: 4490
Suburbs around Humeburn
Adavale	Cooladdi	Wyandra
Quilpie	Humeburn	Coongoola
Yowah	Eulo	Cunnamulla

Humeburn is a locality in the Shire of Paroo, Queensland, Australia. In the 2021 census, Humeburn had a population of 9 people.

== Geography ==
The Paroo River flows through the locality from the north (Cooladdi) to the south (Eulo).

The Boobara Opal Reserve (27.5818°S 145.4177°E) is located in the south-east of the locality.

The land use is grazing on native vegetation.

Humeburn has the following mountains (from north to south):

- Mount Gindighally (27.2680°S 145.3362°E)
- Mount Googoolwaddy (27.2689°S 145.3984°E) 300 metres (980 ft)
- Mount Arthur (27.2817°S 145.3402°E)
- Mount Harry (27.2881°S 145.3538°E)
- Mount Maria (27.2999°S 145.4070°E)
- Mount Anderson (27.3651°S 145.2374°E)
- Beal Bluff (27.3719°S 145.3234°E) 259 metres (850 ft)
- Mount Banco (27.3994°S 145.1995°E)
- Mount Bowen (27.4295°S 145.1804°E)
- Mount Herbert (27.6522°S 145.1053°E) 241 metres (791 ft)

== History ==
The locality most likely takes its name from the Humeburn pastoral lease of 50 square miles (130 km^{2}) operated by A.F. Sullivan in the District of Warrego in 1865. Sullivan also operated two similarly sized pastoral leases in the area called Humeburn North and Humeburn South. As at 2016, the Humeburn pastoral station still operates as a beef cattle producer.

== Demographics ==
In the 2016 census, Humeburn had a population of 22 people.

In the 2021 census, Humeburn had a population of 9 people.

== Education ==
There are no schools in Humeburn. The nearest government primary schools are Wyandra State School in neighbouring Wyandra in the north-east, Cunnamulla State School in neighbouring Cunnamulla to the south-east, and Eulo State School in neighbouring Eulo to the south. The nearest government secondary school is Cunnamulla State School (to Year 12). However, due to the size of the locality of Humeburn, much of the locality is too distant from these schools for a daily commute, so the alternatives are distance education and boarding school.
