= Mary Washington Howe =

American educator (1852–1900)

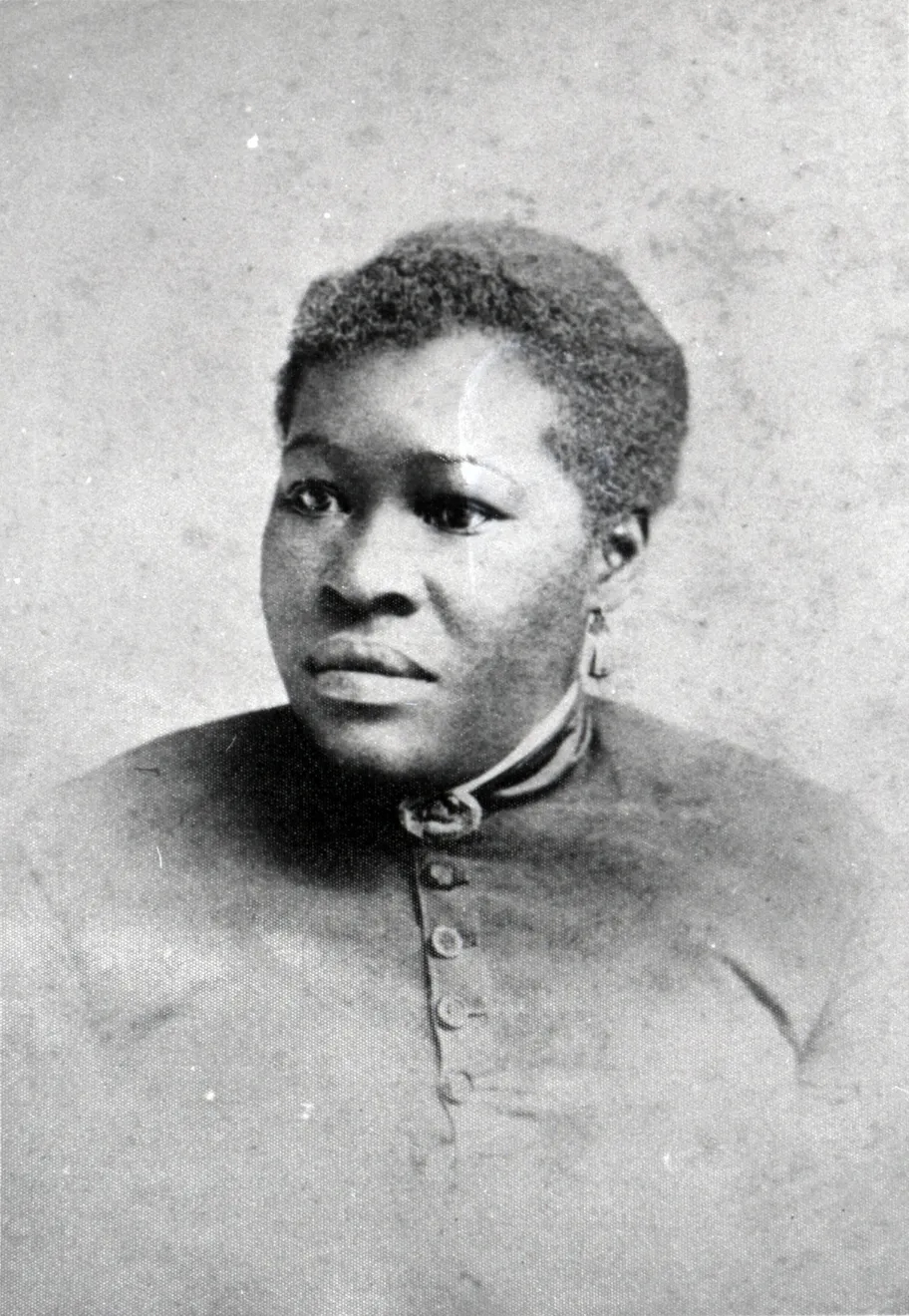
- Born: January 8, 1852; Wilmington, North Carolina, U.S.
- Died: March 20, 1900 (aged 48)
- Occupations: Teacher, principal

Mary Washington Howe (January 8, 1852 – March 20, 1900) was an American educator in Wilmington, North Carolina. She was the first and only female principal of the Williston Graded School.

== Biography ==
Howe was born on January 8, 1852, to parents Mary Moore Walker and Alfred Augustus Howe. Both her maternal and paternal grandmothers were Native American, and both of her grandfathers were originally from Africa before being sold into slavery. Her father was a freedman and well-known carpenter in Wilmington.

Early on in her life, Howe was educated by private tutors. She later attended the Institute for Colored Youth, a Quaker school in Philadelphia. After she returned to Wilmington in 1874, she became a teacher at the Williston Grammar School. Within a few years, Howe became the first and only female principal of the school, and she held the position for 22 years until her death.

Howe died at the age of 48 on March 20, 1900, three weeks after the start of an illness. Her funeral was held at St. Mark's Episcopal Church, and she was buried at the Pine Forest Cemetery in Wilmington.

An elementary school named after her was opened in Wilmington, North Carolina in 1963.
