= Melbourne Cup sweeps =

In Australian sports betting

A sweep is when a number of people pay to purchase a set of tickets, each representing a horse. The tickets are given out randomly, and each ticket costs the same (usually $1–$10), so there is no skill element involved, and odds are ignored completely. The prize pool is made up of the receipts exclusively, and is divided out to the holders of the tickets for winning horses. Typically, first place will win about half of the prize pool, with the remainder divided on a sliding scale to second, third, and sometimes fourth place. There may even be some money given to last place, considering the random nature of a sweep.

Office sweeps are exceptionally popular in Australia for the Melbourne Cup, and as a social event the sweep becomes the focus of the day's festivities. Daily newspapers such as The Age or Herald Sun include full colour lift-outs with images of each horse which can be cut up and used as tickets, as well as instructions on running the sweep, and space to record the names of who has each ticket.

In New Zealand office based sweeps are equally popular. Similarly to in Australia, major news such as the New Zealand Herald include full page sweeps pull outs.
