= Jack Howe (Australian footballer) =

Australian rules footballer

Personal information
- Full name: John Alexander Howe
- Born: 24 March 1922; South Yarra, Victoria
- Died: 9 June 2001 (aged 79); Sorrento, Victoria
- Height: 168 cm (5 ft 6 in)
- Weight: 68 kg (150 lb)
- Position: Rover

Playing career^{1}
Years	Club	Games (Goals)
1944–47	St Kilda	23 (30)
1948–53	Brighton (VFA)	101 (148)
- ^{1} Playing statistics correct to the end of 1953.

John Alexander Howe (24 March 1922 – 9 June 2001) was an Australian rules footballer who played with St Kilda in the Victorian Football League (VFL).
