= Yowah nut =

Type of opal

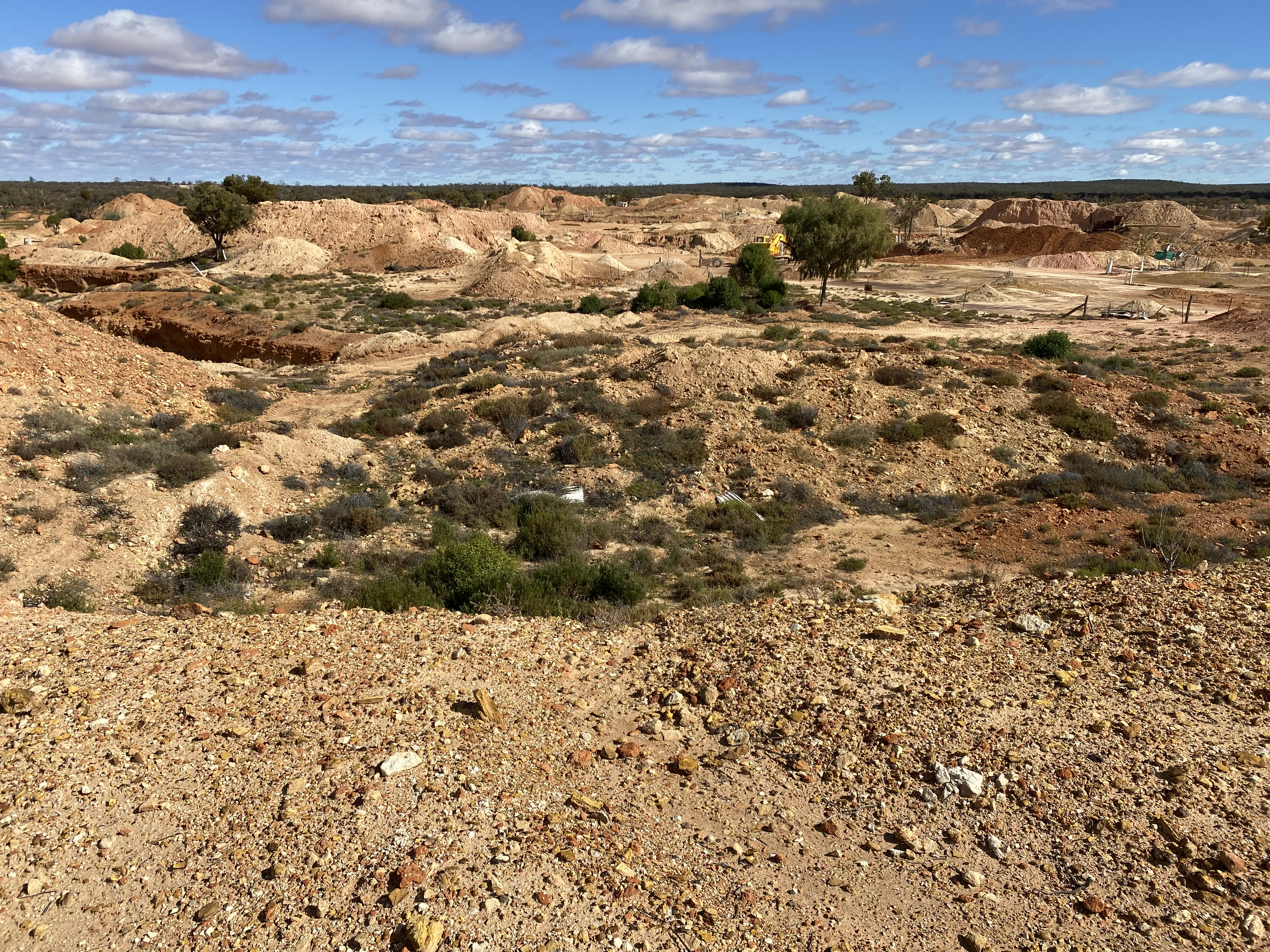
The Yowah opal field in the Shire of Paroo

The Yowah nut is a type of precious opal, found within the Yowah opal fields situated at Yowah, Shire of Paroo, South West Queensland, Australia since the latter part of the 19th century. These opals are known for their distinctive nut-like shape, opalescent patterns, and vibrant colours.

== Geology and formation ==
Yowah, an opal mining town with a population of 126, is known for its Yowah nuts. The Yowah opal field is characterized by the presence of ironstone concretions, which serve as the host material for the opal deposits. Yowah nuts are a type of precious opal, which is a hydrated form of silica. They are formed through a natural process that involves the percolation of silica-rich water into cavities and voids within ironstone concretions. Over time, the silica deposits accumulate and solidify, creating opalescent patterns. Bryan Rossiter discovered them before becoming the manager of the Southern Cross Mine, registered in Yowah on 1 September 1884. Characterized by its unique resemblance to a "nut," the Yowah nut distinguishes itself from other opal formations. This distinct shape arises from a natural process involving the substitution of organic material with opal. Over time, the original matter, often a fossilized shell or wood, undergoes decay, leaving behind a void that is subsequently filled with opal. The rarity is due to only one in 10,000 Yowah Nuts contain opal. The opalization process imbues the interior of the void with an assortment of hues and designs, giving rise to the array of colours including blue, green, red, yellow, and orange. These are highlighted by flashes of iridescence that transform as the angle of observation shifts. This optical phenomenon, referred to as "opalescence," which augments the gemstone's allure and value.

== Yowah Moon opal ==
David Darby, an Indigenous Australian opal miner from Yowah, discovered the "Yowah Moon opal" in 2020 on his late father's mine at Brandy Gully, on the outskirts of Yowah. Opals are highly valued worldwide, but to Darby, it also had spiritual value. Yowah nut opals were formed during the Cretaceous period, approximately 65 to 135 million years ago, coinciding with the time of the dinosaurs. In March 2024, Geoscience Australia applied for funding from the Australian Government National Cultural Heritage Account Funding program, to purchase the opal for $100,000, which Darby accepted despite the possibility of selling it to a private buyer for up to $200,000. The organisation planned to house it in the "Rocks That Shape Australia" collection in Canberra as Darby wished to keep the opal in Australia and make it publicly accessible.

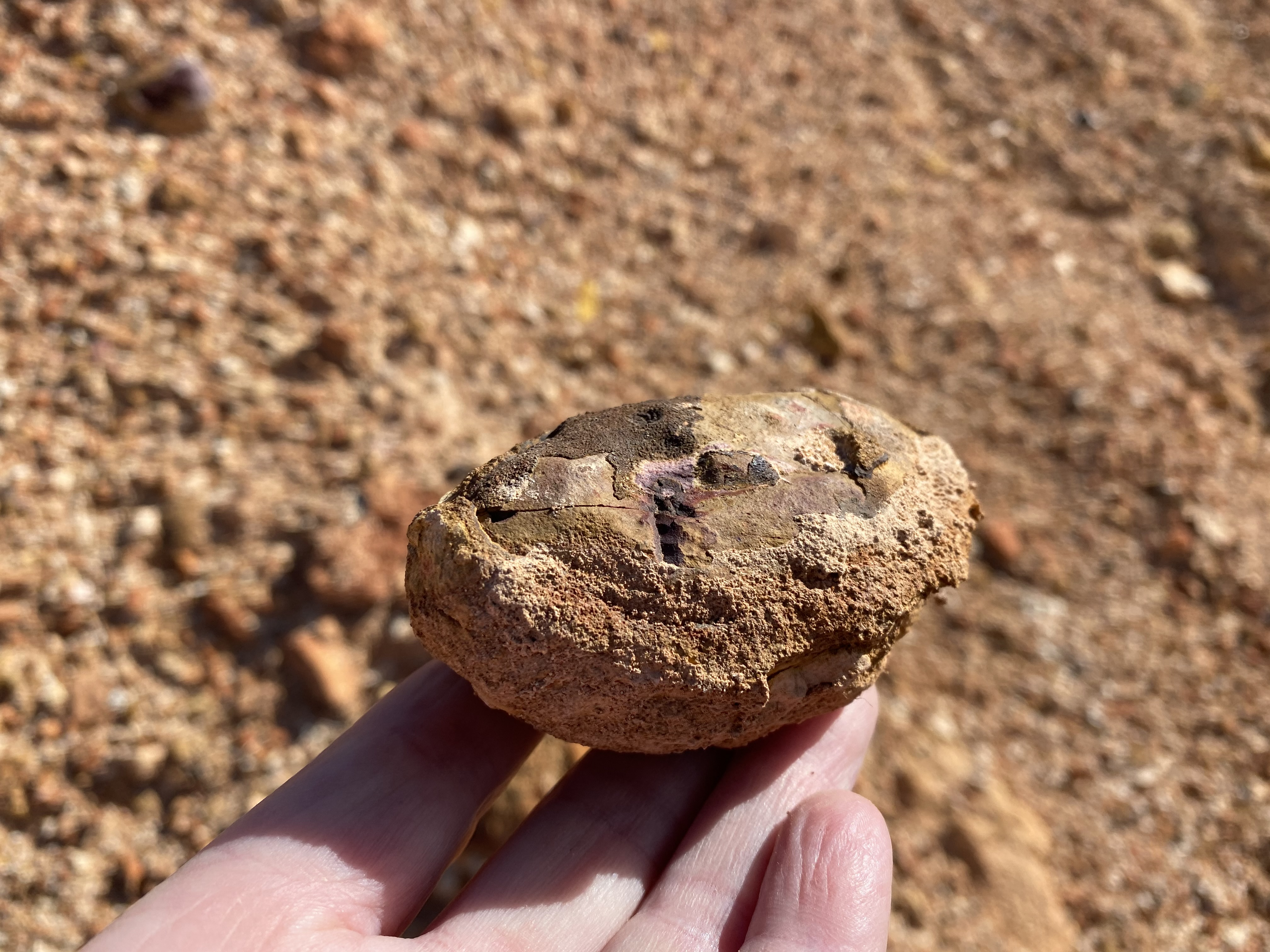
An unopened Yowah nut located in Yowah, South West Queensland.

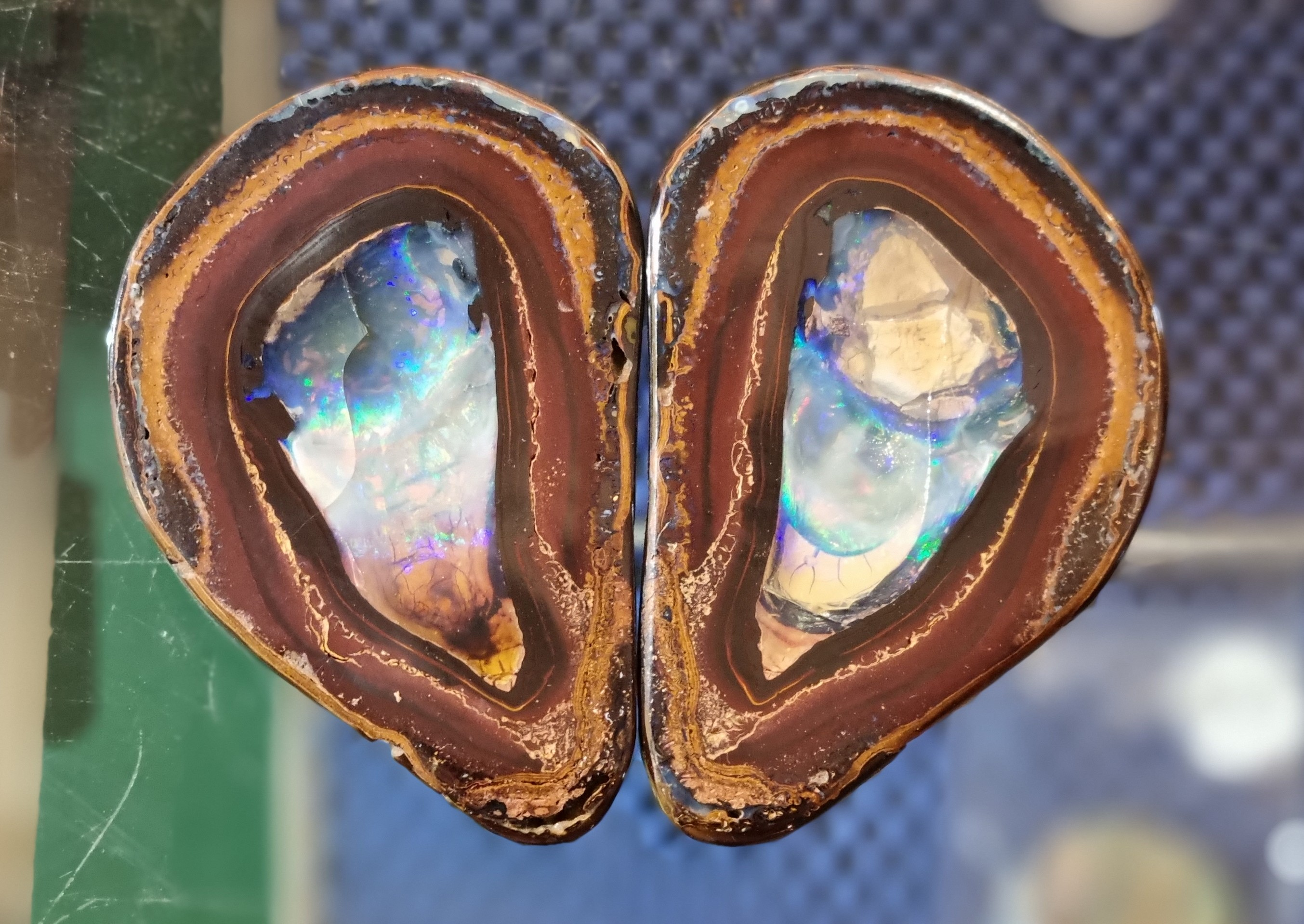
Opal inside a Yowah nut

== Conservation and mining ==
Mining for Yowah nuts requires delicate handling, as they are often encased within hard ironstone. Conservation efforts are required to ensure their sustainable harvesting. The Queensland Government has produced wetland mapping to identify and map flora and fauna in the area to provide greater protection.
