= Jackie Howe =

Australian sheep shearer (1861–1920)

Jack "Jackie" Howe
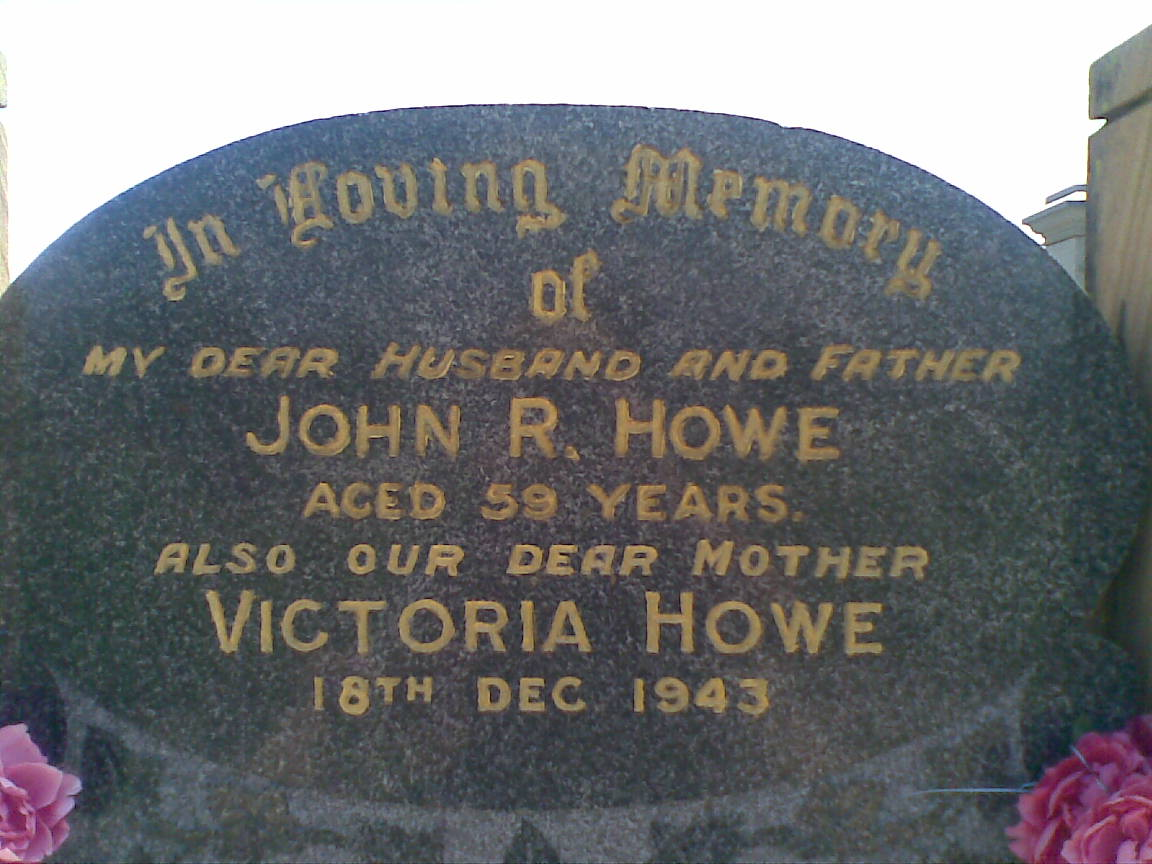
- Gravesite memorial inscription for Jack Howe in Blackall cemetery
- Born: 26 July 1861; Killarney, Queensland
- Died: 21 July 1920 (aged 58)
- Occupation: Shearer
- Known for: Sheep shearing

John Robert Howe (10 July 1861 – 21 July 1920) was a legendary Australian sheep shearer at the end of the 19th century. He shot to fame in pre-Federation Australia in 1892 when he broke the daily and weekly shearing records across the colonies.

Howe was considered one of the three wonders of Queensland, along with Eulo publican and personality Isabel Gray (c. 1851–1929), and the cook and Barcaldine hotelier Jimmy Ah Foo.

== Life ==
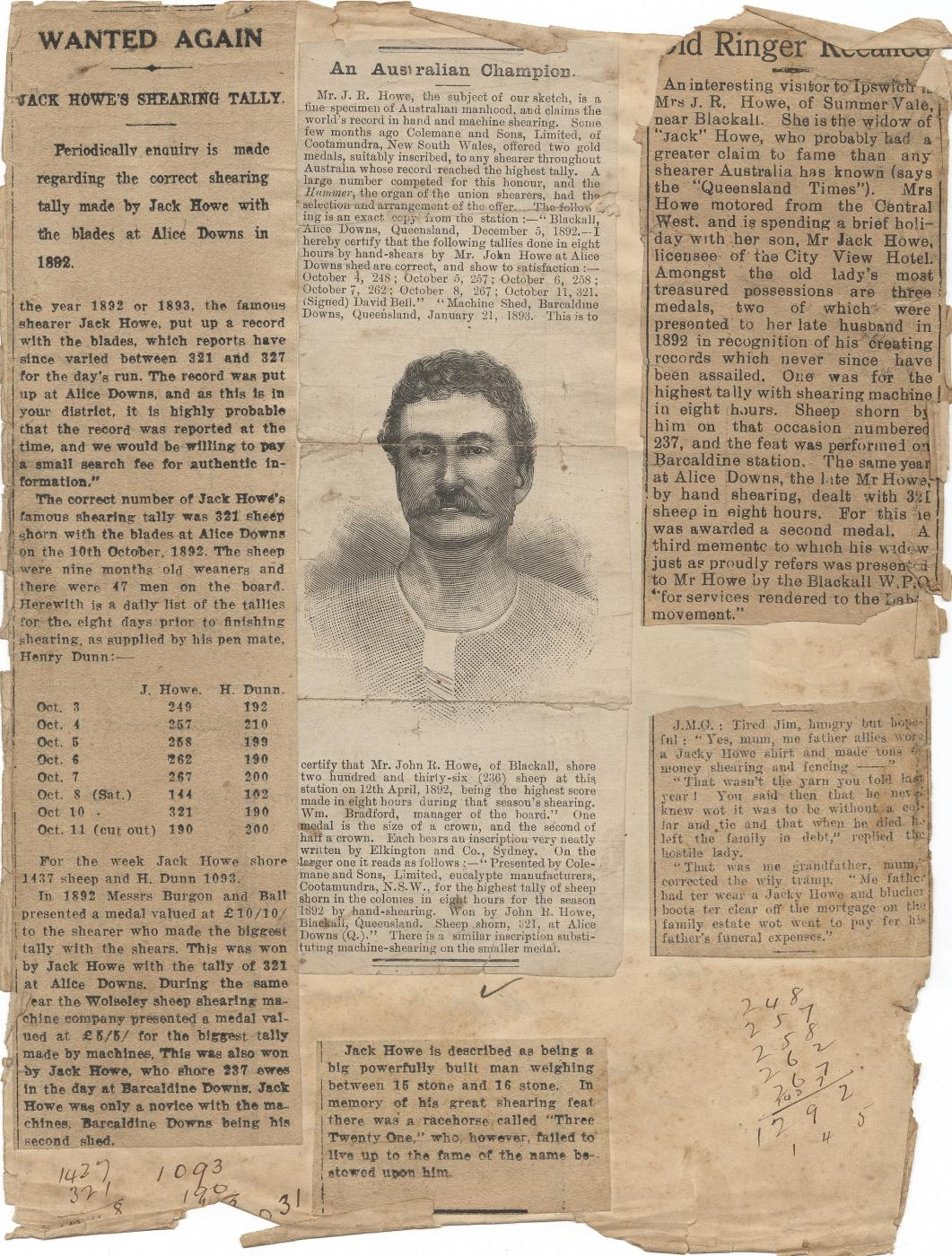
Jackie Howe newspaper cuttings, 1890s

Howe was born at Killarney near Warwick, Queensland. Jackie Howe's father, Jack Howe, was also a shearer and a clown with La Rosier's circus, claiming to be the first clown to travel the Australian colonies, and was town-crier in Warwick. His mother, Miss Stokes, was a lady's companion in 1840 at Canning Downs station and one of the first European women in the area, before marrying a second time to Jack Howe senior. He grew up as a shearer around Warwick and the Darling Downs, before a short time at Tambo, trying gold prospecting. It was there that he commenced professional shearing.

Howe was active during the shearer strikes of the 1891 and 1894, and was a committed trade unionist.

Later on Howe owned a public hotel, The Barcoo Hotel, in Blackall, Queensland. There is now a statue there of him holding a sheep. He also at one time was a licensee of the Universal Hotel. However publican life was not for him, and he went onto purchase the property Shamrock Park, and then Summervale.

After an extended illness, Howe died at Blackall in July 1920, leaving behind a widow, six sons, and two daughters. After Howe's death, friend Queensland Premier T. J. Ryan said, in a telegram to Howe's widow, "I have lost a true and trusted friend and Labor has lost a champion".

One son was John Henry Howe, but also known as Jack Howe. He started as a chemist, but also went into shearing, and wrote a book on his father. He later became a publican. Another son, Leslie John Howe got married in March 1925. The second son, Darsey John Howe, wed in September 1927.

== Shearing record ==
Howe was described as being "one of the best physically built men in Australia". Weighing about 14 stone (200 lb; 89 kg), he measured 47.5 inches (1,210 mm) around the chest and 26 inches (660 mm) around the thigh.

On 10 October 1892, Howe had shorn 321 sheep in seven hours and 40 minutes at Alice Downs station, near Blackall, Queensland. This was a faster tally than any other shearer had achieved before. In the week beforehand, Howe also set the weekly record, shearing 1,437 sheep in 44 hours and 30 minutes. Howe's daily record was beaten by Ted Reick in 1950, but Reick was using machine shears, while Howe's hand shears were little more than scissors.

== Legacy ==
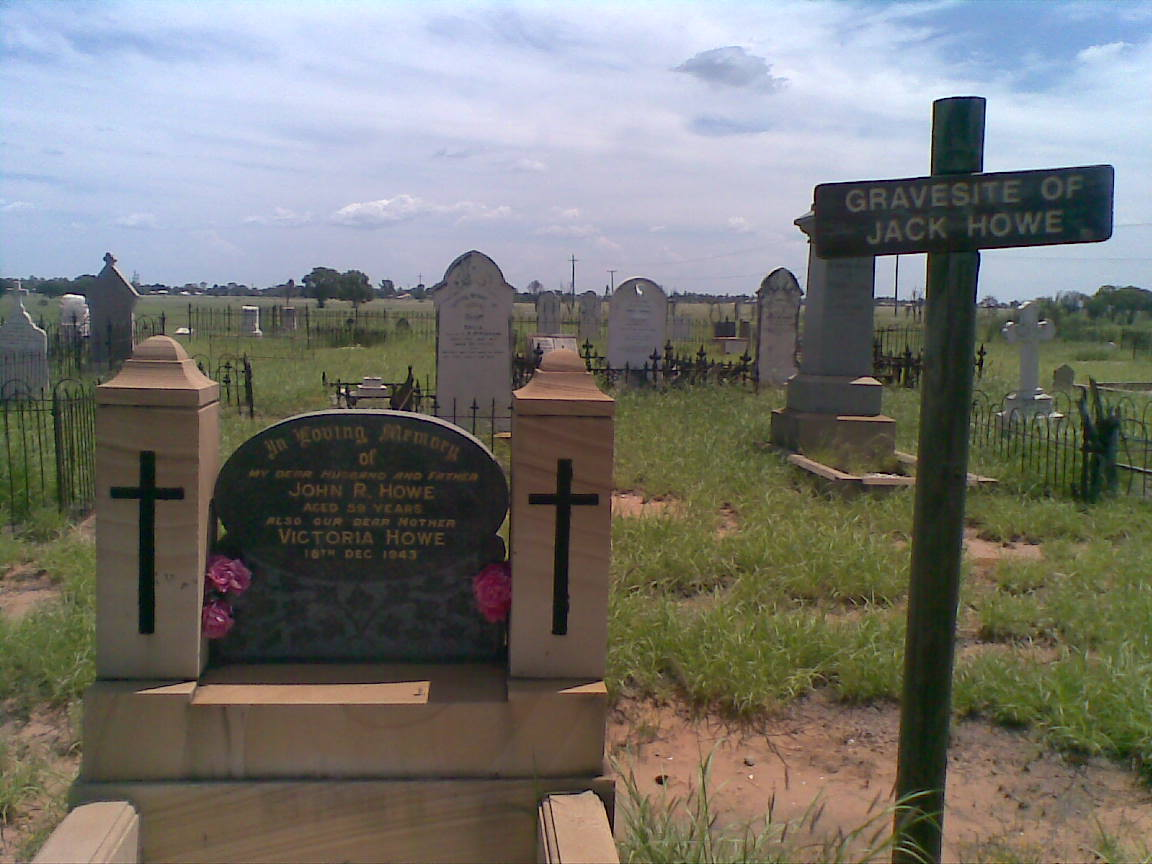
Jack Howe's gravesite in Blackall cemetery

Jackie Howe is depicted by a bronze statue in Blackall.

After his death in 1920, a poem was penned in 1940 in his honour, as King of the shearers.

In October 2015, Howe's record was reported as still unbeaten after 123 years.

Howe became the name given to navy blue singlet tops. According to legend, this is what Howe was wearing on the day he broke the shearing record. It has also been indicated in a woolshed, a big shearer took his shirt and snipped off the sleeves with a pair of shears, saying "I'll make a Jackie Howe of it", with the name associated since.
