= John Thomas Howe =

American legislator in North Carolina

John Thomas Howe was an American state legislator in North Carolina. He represented New Hanover County in the North Carolina House of Representatives in 1897. Alfred Howe was his father. John worked for Alexander Manly's Daily Record newspaper as a general traveling agent. He was a Republican.

He opposed Republican governor Russell on a railroad bill.

== See also ==
- African American officeholders from the end of the Civil War until before 1900
