= John T. Howe (engineer) =

John T. Howe (1928–2022) was a mechanical engineer and former chief scientist at NASA Ames Research Center, Moffett Field, California.

He is known for his pioneering research contributions to the aerothermodynamics of atmospheric entry, including radiative energy transfer, reactive gas flows, and innovative thermal protection systems.

John T. Howe received his B.S. from the University of Michigan in 1950 and his M.S. in 1956 and the degree of Engineer in 1958 from Stanford University, all in engineering mechanics. John also completed his post doctorate studies and continued research at Stanford University while working at SRI Stanford Research Institute.

He taught hypervelocity atmospheric flight and real gas phenomena at Stanford University.

After several years with Stanford Research Institute, he joined the Ames Laboratory of NASA. During his 35 years with NASA, he served as senior staff scientist, head of aerothermodynamics, assistant chief for the Physics Branch, and branch chief for fluid dynamics.

He was a member of the AIAA Thermophysics Technical Committee (1982–84) and an associate editor for the Journal of Spacecraft and Rockets (1982–84). He is a recipient of the AIAA Thermophysics Award (1986) and a Fellow of AIAA.
