= Yowah =

- Town
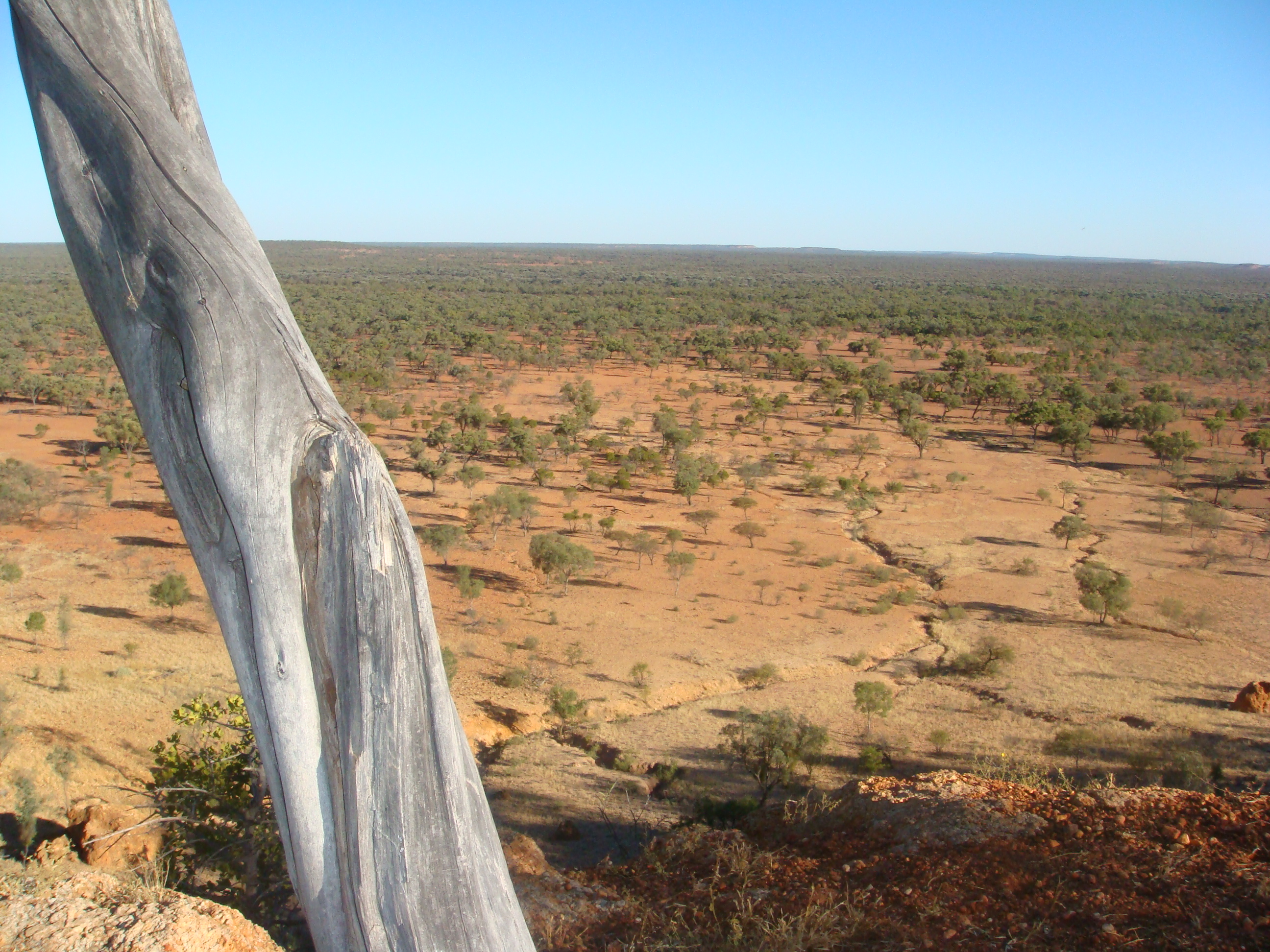
- Yowah landscape, 2008

- Interactive map of Yowah
- Coordinates: 27.9681°S 144.6361°E
- Country: Australia
- State: Queensland
- LGA: Shire of Paroo
- Location: 91.2 km (56.7 mi) NW of Eulo; 96.5 km (60.0 mi) E of Thargomindah; 158 km (98 mi) WNW of Cunnamulla; 452 km (281 mi) W of St George; 959 km (596 mi) W of Brisbane

Government
  - State electorate: Warrego
  - Federal division: Maranoa

Area
  - Total: 2,909.5 km^{2} (1,123.4 sq mi)

Population
  - Total: 126 (2021)https://abs.gov.au/census/find-census-data/quickstats/2021/SAL33224
  - Density: 0.04331/km^{2} (0.1122/sq mi)
- Time zone: UTC+10:00 (AEST)
- Postcode: 4490
Localities around Yowah
Quilpie	Quilpie	Humeburn
Thargomindah	Yowah	Eulo
Thargomindah	Thargomindah	Eulo

Yowah is an outback town and locality in the Shire of Paroo, Queensland, Australia. In the 2021 census, the locality of Yowah had a population of 126 people, 77 male and 50 female.

The town is known for its opal mining and numerous opal fields that lie around the town as well as the "Yowah nut", a local type of opal distinctive to the region.

== Geography ==
Yowah is in western Queensland, 938 kilometres (583 mi) west of the state capital, Brisbane and 132 kilometres (82 mi) west of Cunnamulla.

Access to Yowah is via a bitumen road. Driving in to Yowah at night is not recommended due to animals on the road.

The Adventure Way enters the locality from the south-east (Eulo) and exits to the south-west (Thargomindah). It is a State Strategic Touring Routes in Queensland.

The land use is grazing on native vegetation.

== History ==
The Yowah pastoral station was formed on Yowah Creek in the mid 1860s by Vincent James Dowling consisting of the Bargoon, Dundoo and Bundoona outstations. In 1868, the Queensland government established the Yowah Native Police barracks under Sub-Inspector James Gilmour.

The area was first leased in 1883 to prospective settlers and opal mining has been the central operation within the district since the first opal fields were discovered. The population swells during the winter months as many "regular" and "one off" visitors enjoy the weather and the friendly welcome this town offers.

Yowah State School opened on 22 January 1998. It was one of the smallest state primary schools in Queensland; in 2012, there were three students. The school closed in 2017 due to a lack of students. It was at 5 Harlequin Drive (27.9679°S 144.6312°E). Its website has been archived.

In August 2014, the town committee built two artesian spas.

== Demographics ==
In the 2006 census, the locality of Yowah had a population of 142 people.

In the 2016 census, the locality of Yowah had a population of 141 people.

In the 2021 census, the locality of Yowah had a population of 126 people.

== Education ==
There are no schools in Yowah nor nearby. The alternatives are distance education and boarding schools.

== Facilities ==
Paroo Shire Council operates the Rural Transaction Centre which accommodates a tourist information centre, a public library, cafe, internet and tourist information.

There is also a caravan park and general store which sells groceries and fuel and has an ATM.

There is a public hall and flying doctor rooms with the Doctors attending every Friday. Craft group, indoor bowls and meals/bar two nights a week at hall and a weekly dinner and "duck race" to raise monies for SES/Flying Doctor etc at Caravan Park, during the Winter months.

The town is serviced by the State Emergency Service and the Rural Fire Service. There are two airfield runways which are lit at night.

There are no pumping or storage facilities in the town and the town relies on natural artesian pressure for its water supply. Surplus artesian water discharges into a bore drain. There are no standby facilities for Yowah and if the bore fails there would be a need to transport water from one of the other water supplies in the town for the duration of the problem. The water quality has been deemed to be safe, chemically.

== Events ==
Yowah Opal Festival is a yearly festival (3rd weekend in July) to promote and celebrate opal mining in the area. Sales, exhibitions and nightly entertainment on offer.

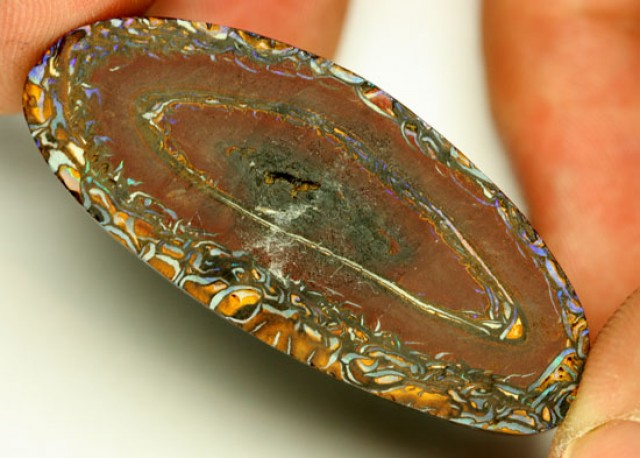
Yowah nut opal. This nut has been cracked in half.

== Attractions ==
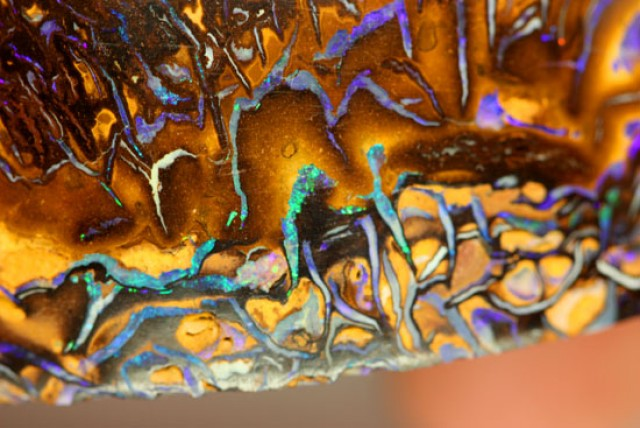
Precious Opal mixed in the iron stone of a Yowah nut

Yowah has a fossicking area (fossicking licence available at the general store).

There is a heritage trail in which to explore the surrounding localities.

There is also a donation camping area, with amenities (toilets, showers and laundry).

Artesian spas is a community run facility which offers two geothermally heated baths with temperatures ranging from 39C in the cooler pool to 43C in the hotter pool. The Great Artesian Basin sources the spas and the only communal source of drinking water.
