= Murweh =

- Suburb
- Interactive map of Murweh
- Coordinates: 26.9363°S 145.7441°E
- Country: Australia
- State: Queensland
- LGA: Shire of Murweh
- Location: 61.6 km (38.3 mi) NW of Wyandra; 124 km (77 mi) SW of Charleville; 390 km (240 mi) W of Roma; 747 km (464 mi) W of Toowoomba; 875 km (544 mi) W of Brisbane

Government
  - State electorate: Warrego
  - Federal division: Maranoa

Area
  - Total: 694.7 km^{2} (268.2 sq mi)

Population
  - Total: 9 (2021 census)
  - Density: 0.0130/km^{2} (0.0336/sq mi)
- Time zone: UTC+10:00 (AEST)
- Postcode: 4470
Suburbs around Murweh
Cooladdi	Cooladdi	Bakers Bend
Cooladdi	Murweh	Bakers Bend
Cooladdi	Wyandra	Wyandra

Murweh is a rural locality in the Shire of Murweh, Queensland, Australia. In the 2021 census, Murweh had a population of 9 people.

== Geography ==
Murweh is 124 kilometres (77 mi) by road south-west of Charleville.

The Mitchell Highway passes through the far east of the locality, entering from the north-east (Bakers Bend) and exiting to the south-east (Wyandra).

The Western railway line runs parallel and immediately west of the highway with the locality served by the now-abandoned Yanna railway station (26.9327°S 146.0431°E).

The land use is grazing on native vegetation.

== History ==
The locality takes its name from a pastoral run, named in 1865 using an Aboriginal name for a large waterhole.

Following the 2010–11 Queensland floods, freight services were suspended on the Western railway line between Westgate (in Bakers Bend) and Cunnamulla, and have not resumed. In September 2014, a truck carrying ammonium nitrate exploded near Wyandra, damaging the nearby railway bridge, which has not been repaired, effectively closing the line between Westgate and Cunnamulla.

== Demographics ==
In the 2016 census, Murweh had "no people or a very low population".

In the 2021 census, Murweh had a population of 9 people.

== Education ==
There are no schools in Murweh. The nearest government primary school is Wyandra State School in neighbouring Wyandra to the south, but, due to the distances involved, it would be too far from some parts of the locality for a daily commute. There are no nearby secondary schools. The alternatives are distance education and boarding school.
