= Cooladdi =

- Town
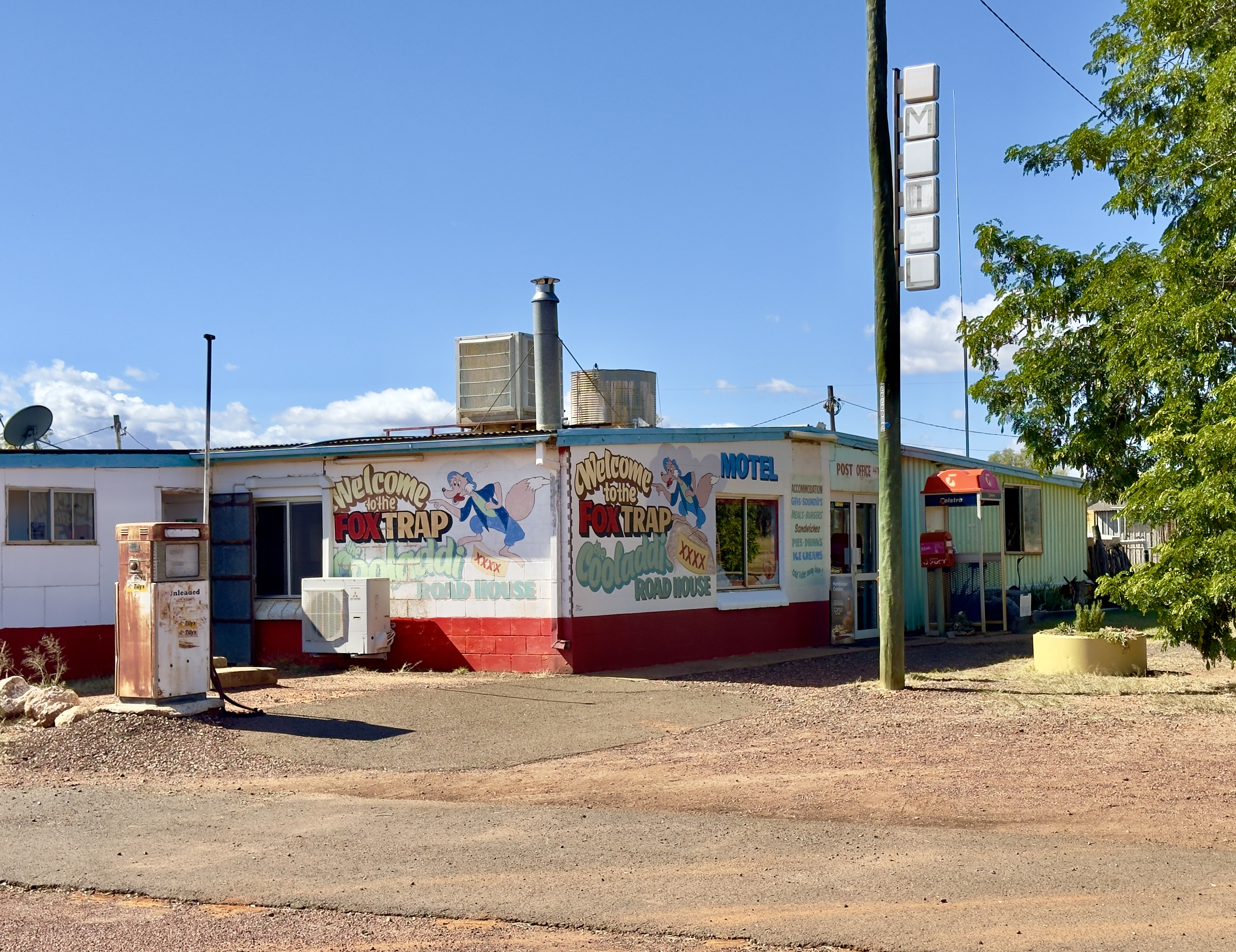
- Road House Cooladdi, 2024

- Interactive map of Cooladdi
- Coordinates: 26.6402°S 145.4619°E
- Country: Australia
- State: Queensland
- LGA: Shire of Murweh
- Location: 88.9 km (55.2 mi) SW of Charleville; 356 km (221 mi) W of Roma; 834 km (518 mi) W of Brisbane

Government
  - State electorate: Warrego
  - Federal division: Maranoa

Area
  - Total: 3,990.2 km^{2} (1,540.6 sq mi)
- Elevation: 300 m (980 ft)

Population
  - Total: 7 (2021 census)
  - Density: 0.00175/km^{2} (0.0045/sq mi)
- Time zone: UTC+10:00 (AEST)
- Postcode: 4479
Localities around Cooladdi
Adavale	Langlo	Ward
Adavale	Cooladdi	Bakers Bend
Humeburn	Wyandra	Murweh

Cooladdi is a rural town and locality in the Shire of Murweh, Queensland, Australia. The town is 88.9 kilometres (55.2 mi) south-west of Charleville.

Claims have been made that Cooladdi is Australia's smallest town by population. In 2015, the population was 3 (down from 4 in 2013), all of whom lived at the general store. In the 2021 census, the locality of Cooladdi had a population of 7 people.

== Geography ==
The town is in the centre of the locality. The Western railway line passes from east to west through the town and locality. The locality was served by a number of railway stations (from east to west):

- Nimaru railway station (now abandoned) (26.5707°S 145.8567°E)
- Coothalla railway station (26.5842°S 145.7366°E)
- Loddon railway station (now abandoned) (26.5936°S 145.6517°E)
- Cooladdi railway station serving the town (26.6417°S 145.4634°E)
- Yalamurra railway station (now abandoned) (26.6456°S 145.2943°E)

The Diamantina Developmental Road (which forms part of the 1578 kilometre (980 mi) Warrego Way State Strategic Touring Route between Brisbane and Birdsville) also passes from east to west through the town and locality.

== History ==
The railway station was originally called Yarronvale after a local pastoral station with the town taking its name from the railway station. However, it was renamed in 1913 to Cooladdi, an Aboriginal word meaning black duck, to avoid confusion with the pastoral station, which was 15 miles away.

Cooladdi was a railhead for the local pastoral community. At one time, Cooladdi had a school, post office, and police station with a population of about 270 people. As the railway line extended further west, Cooladdi's role and population declined.

The Cooladdi State School originally opened on 19 March 1926 as a Provisional School with 9 students under teacher A.W. Marsh. In 1933, a new school building was constructed and the school redesignated as a State School. The school closed on 3 May 1974. It was located opposite the railway station on Cooladdi Access Road (26.6404°S 145.4638°E).

== Demographics ==
In 2015, the population was 3 (down from 4 in 2013), all of whom resided at the general store.

In the 2016 census, the locality of Cooladdi had a population of 16 people.

In the 2021 census, the locality of Cooladdi had a population of 7 people.

== Education ==
There are no schools in Cooladdi. The nearest government primary and secondary schools Charleville State School and Charleville State High School respectively, both in Charleville to the north-east. However, only those living in the east of the locality would be within daily commuting range. Other options are distance education and boarding schools.

== Places of interest ==
There are a number of homesteads in the locality:

- Allambie (26.9364°S 145.4402°E)
- Auburn Vale (26.4471°S 145.7519°E)
- Auburn Vale (26.5691°S 145.8579°E)
- Bodouna (26.7104°S 145.7768°E)
- Boin (26.6402°S 145.7791°E)
- Coolabah (26.8749°S 145.4026°E)
- Coolabah (26.8750°S 145.4014°E)
- Cooladdi Park (26.5291°S 145.4894°E)
- Cungella (26.7341°S 145.6562°E)
- Glenallen (26.4225°S 145.6215°E)
- Inkerman (26.5925°S 145.6500°E)
- Loddon (26.5616°S 145.6051°E)
- Merigol (26.7636°S 145.7957°E)
- Monamby (26.6533°S 145.4634°E)
- Mount Pleasant (26.3884°S 145.7511°E)
- Nimboy (26.4121°S 145.3994°E)
- Weaner Creek (26.6948°S 145.6779°E)
- Wooyenong (26.8129°S 145.6690°E)
- Yarronvale (26.8027°S 145.3463°E)
