= Riversleigh =

Riversleigh may refer to:

- Riversleigh, Queensland, a locality in the Shire of Murweh in South-West Queensland
- Australian Fossil Mammal Sites (Riversleigh), a World Heritage listed fossil site in North-West Queensland
