= Wallal, Queensland =

Wallal Queensland
- Coordinates: 26.6152°S 146.1261°E
- Postcode(s): 4470
- Time zone: AEST (UTC+10:00)
- Location: 29.8 km (19 mi) SSW of Charleville; 296 km (184 mi) W of Roma; 695 km (432 mi) WNW of Toowoomba; 773 km (480 mi) W of Brisbane
- LGA(s): Shire of Murweh
- State electorate(s): Warrego
- Federal division(s): Maranoa

Wallal is a rural town in the Shire of Murweh, Queensland, Australia. The town is within the locality of Bakers Bend.

== History ==
The town of Wallal first appears on an 1877 survey plan.

Wallal Provisional School opened in 1900 and closed in 1907.
