= Queensland National Bank, Charleville =

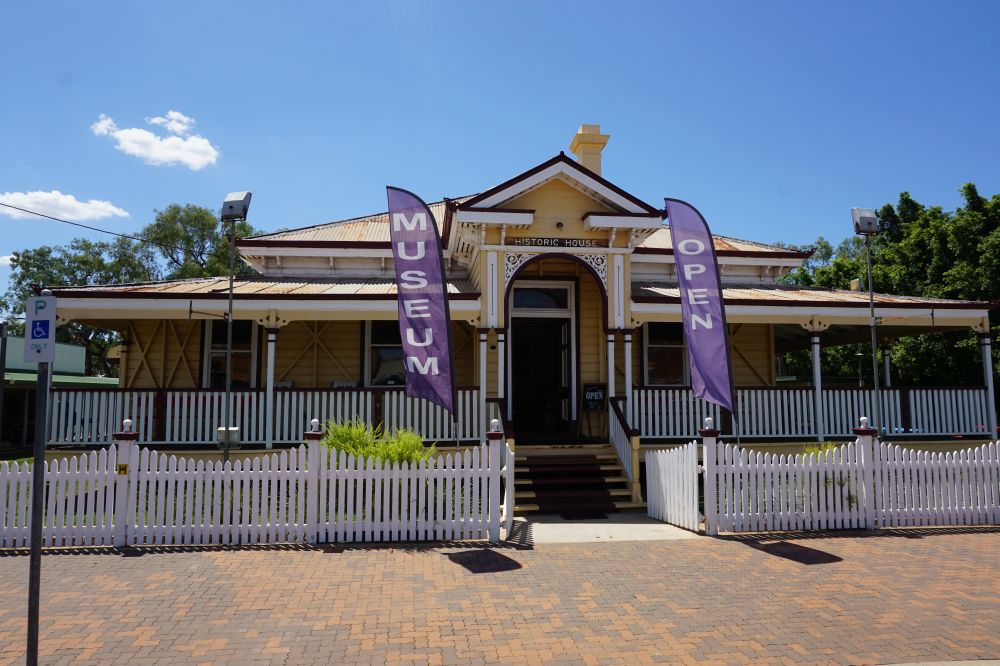
- Queensland National Bank (now museum), Charleville, 2017

- Location within Queensland
- 26.4003°S 146.2403°E
- Location: 87 Alfred Street, Charleville, Shire of Murweh, Queensland, Australia

History
- Design period: 1870s–1890s (late 19th century)
- Built: 1888
- Built for: Queensland National Bank

Site notes
- Architect: Francis Drummond Greville Stanley

Queensland Heritage Register
- Official name: Queensland National Bank (former), 'Historic House'
- Type: state heritage (built)
- Designated: 21 October 1992
- Reference no.: 600757
- Significant period: 1880s (fabric); 1888–1942 (historical use)
- Significant components: residential accommodation – manager's house/quarters, fireplace
- Builders: A Anderson

Queensland National Bank is a heritage-listed former bank and now museum at 87 Alfred Street, Charleville, Shire of Murweh, Queensland, Australia. It was designed by Francis Drummond Greville Stanley and built in 1888 by A Anderson. It is now known as Historic House Museum. It was added to the Queensland Heritage Register on 21 October 1992.

== History ==
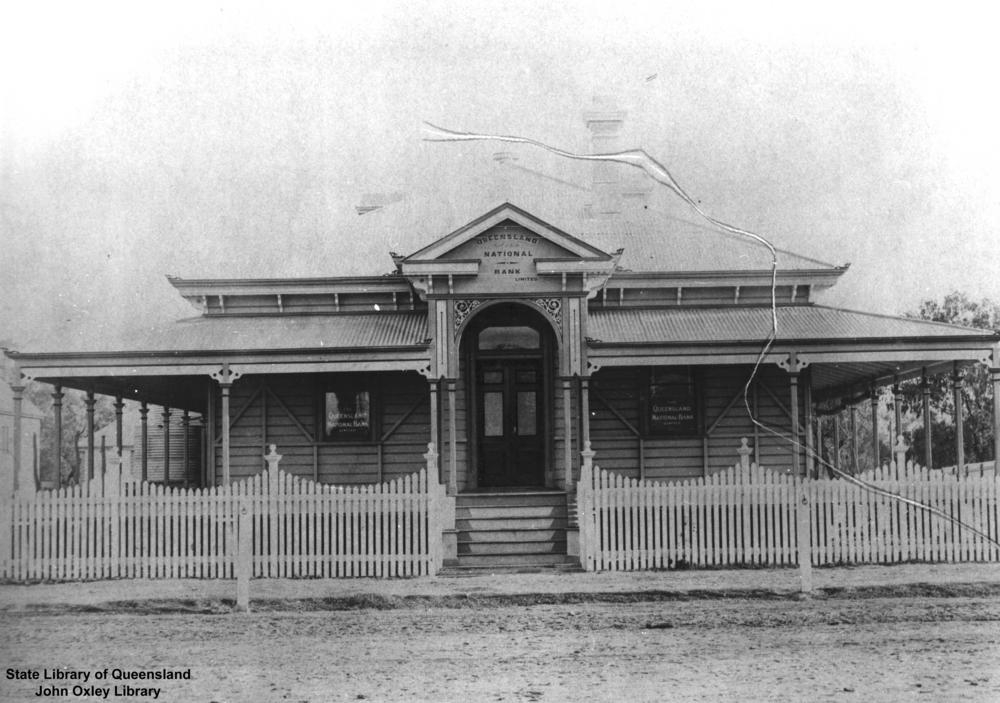
Queensland National Bank, circa 1889

The former bank building was constructed in Charleville in 1888 as the premises of the Queensland National Bank, which had established a branch in the town in 1881.

The town of Charleville was surveyed in 1867 following the surveying of a number of pastoral runs in the district in 1863. Sited on the banks of the Warrego River along a stock route from New South Wales to Western Queensland, the town was to develop as the major service centre for the surrounding pastoral industry. Bullock teams passed through the town, Cobb & Co established stables (as well as a factory for the construction of mail coaches and buggies and an associated sawmill) and in 1888 Charleville's position as a strategic transport node for the south west was confirmed when it became the terminus for the main Western railway line which was extended south to Cunnamulla in 1898 and west to Quilpie in 1917. The Queensland National Bank was the first bank to open a branch in Charleville on 30 July 1881.

The Queensland National Bank was the first and most successful of Queensland's three indigenous 19th century banks. It was established in March 1872 by a group of prominent Queensland squatters, politicians, lawyers, and businessmen who wished to secure development capital free from overseas or intercolonial control. Its first office was established in Queen Street, Brisbane in that year and the bank attracted widespread Queensland patronage. In 1879 it secured the whole of the Queensland Government's banking business. By 1880 it held 40% of deposits in the colony and dominated the Queensland economy.

In 1888 a larger bank premises was constructed at Charleville to the design of F.D.G. Stanley and built by A Anderson for the sum of £2049/14/9. FDG Stanley trained as an architect in Scotland and emigrated to Queensland in 1861. He joined the office of the Queensland Colonial Architect as a clerk in 1863 and was appointed Colonial Architect 1872. He held this position until 1881 when resigned to work full time in private practice. Among his regular clients were several banks including the Queensland National Bank, the Anglican Church and merchant companies. Stanley was one of the most successful architects to practice in nineteenth century Queensland and his work includes the Supreme Court building (Brisbane, burned down), the General Post Office (Brisbane), St Paul's Anglican Church (Maryborough), the Queensland Club (Brisbane) and the Queensland National Bank (Brisbane, no longer extant). Stanley designed timber buildings for the Queensland National Bank in St George, Normanton, Allora and Blackall.

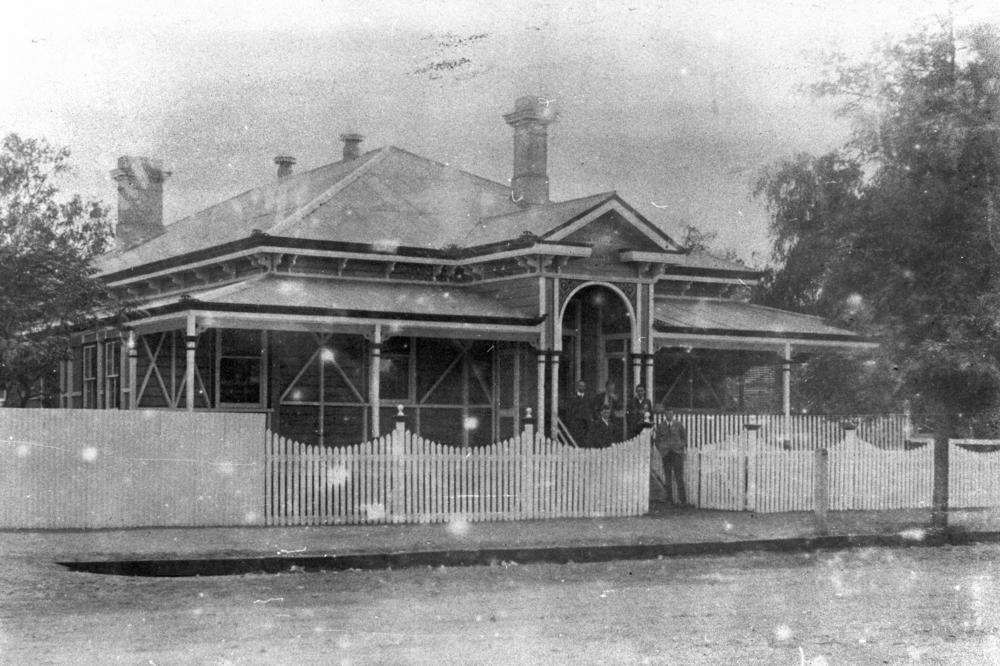
Queensland National Bank, Charleville, 1915

The Charleville bank combined business and accommodation areas, as was common practice at the time for branch offices. At the front of the building were a public access area with a teller's area and safe and a manager's office. The rear section of the building provided living accommodation for the manager and his family, including a room for their maid. This and the quality of finish in the building suggest the social position of a manager of the bank in a regional town.

In 1942, probably as the result of a wartime rationalisation of branches in smaller centres, the Charleville branch was sold to Mr Alex Smith who used it as a residence during his lifetime. In 1948, the Queensland National Bank merged with the National Bank of Australasia, later the National Australia Bank. After the death of Mr Smith his daughter, Mrs Claude Young, converted it into a boarding house, and upon her death the Charleville and District Cultural and Historical Society purchased the building, which is now a local history museum.

== Description ==
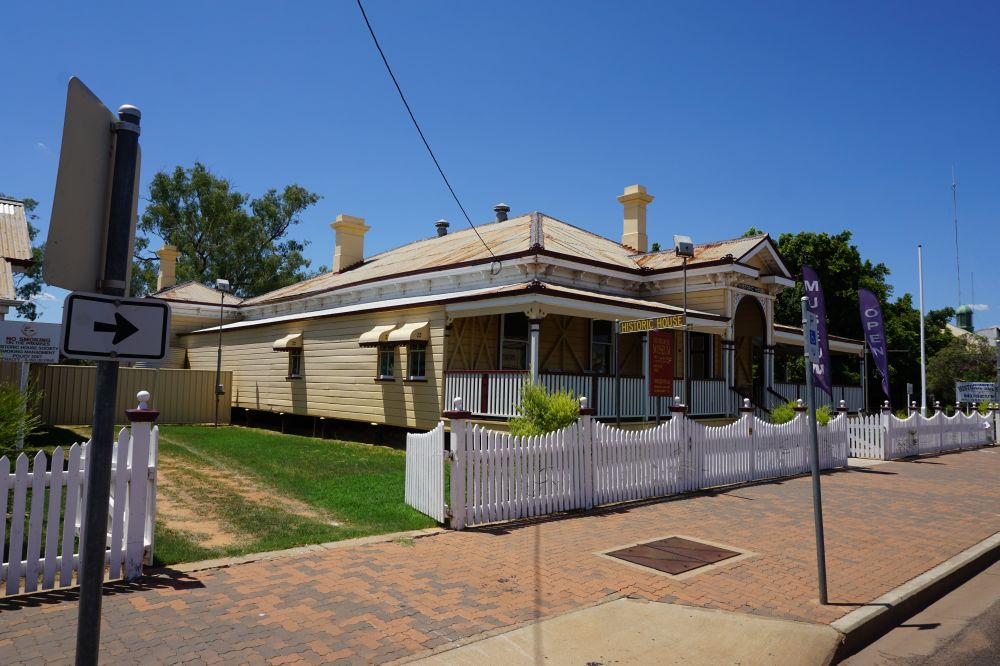
Side view, 2017

The former Queensland National Bank at Charleville is a single storey timber building with an exposed frame and is set on low stumps. It has a hipped roof clad with corrugated iron roof. There are verandahs to the front and sides of the building that have a corrugated iron clad awning supported by timber posts. A projecting central portico rising through the verandah awning marks the entrance to the building and is reached by timber steps.

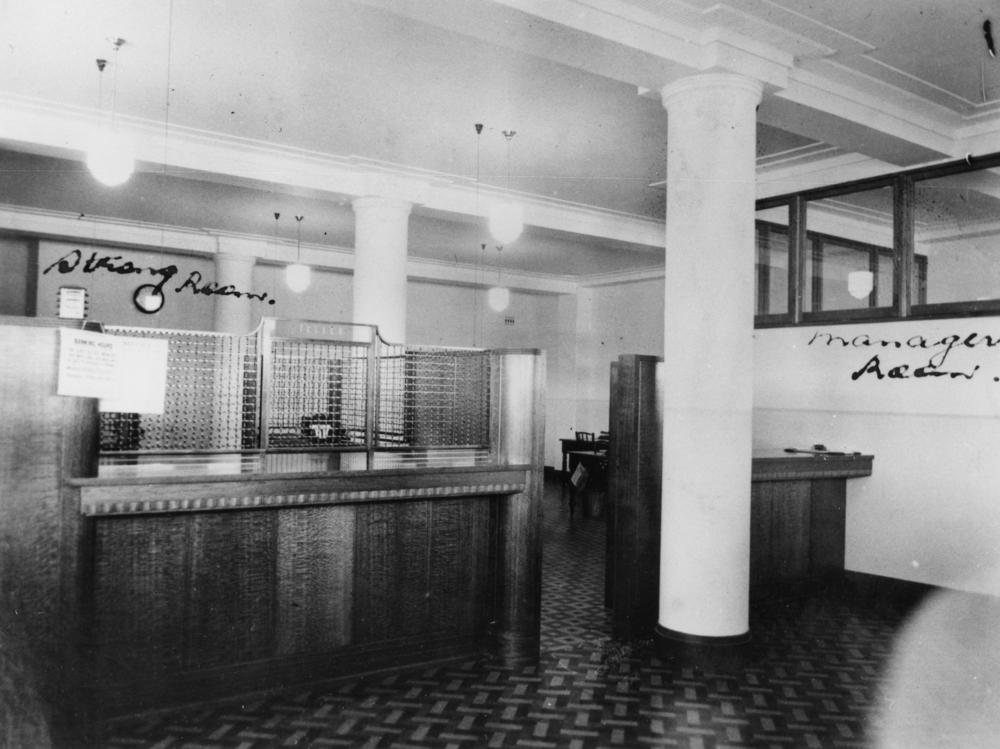
Interior, 1942

Internally the building features high ceilings and cedar joinery and has four marble fireplaces. Several of the rooms are furnished as a place museum.

There is a picket fence to the street.

== Heritage listing ==
The former Queensland National Bank in Charleville was listed on the Queensland Heritage Register on 21 October 1992 having satisfied the following criteria.

The place is important in demonstrating the evolution or pattern of Queensland's history.

The former Queensland National Bank building is important in illustrating the development of Queensland as purpose-built premises for a bank formed to serve Queensland interests and needs when the state was a self-governing colony. The quality of its design and construction also demonstrate the importance of this regional branch at a time when Charleville was firmly established as a centre for the pastoral industry of southwest Queensland.

The place is important in demonstrating the principal characteristics of a particular class of cultural places.

The former Queensland National Bank is important in demonstrating the principal characteristics of a regional bank of its era, being a good example of a timber structure combining a banking chamber, office and manager's residence; a type common for rural bank buildings from the nineteenth century until World War II.

The place is important because of its aesthetic significance.

As a detailed building the former Queensland National Bank contributes to the townscape of Charleville.

The place has a special association with the life or work of a particular person, group or organisation of importance in Queensland's history.

The former Queensland National Bank has a special association with the life and work of architect FDG Stanley, who designed a number of banks for the Queensland National Bank. It is also associated with the development of the QN Bank, the earliest of Queensland's indigenous banks.
