= Landsborough's Blazed Tree (Camp 69) =

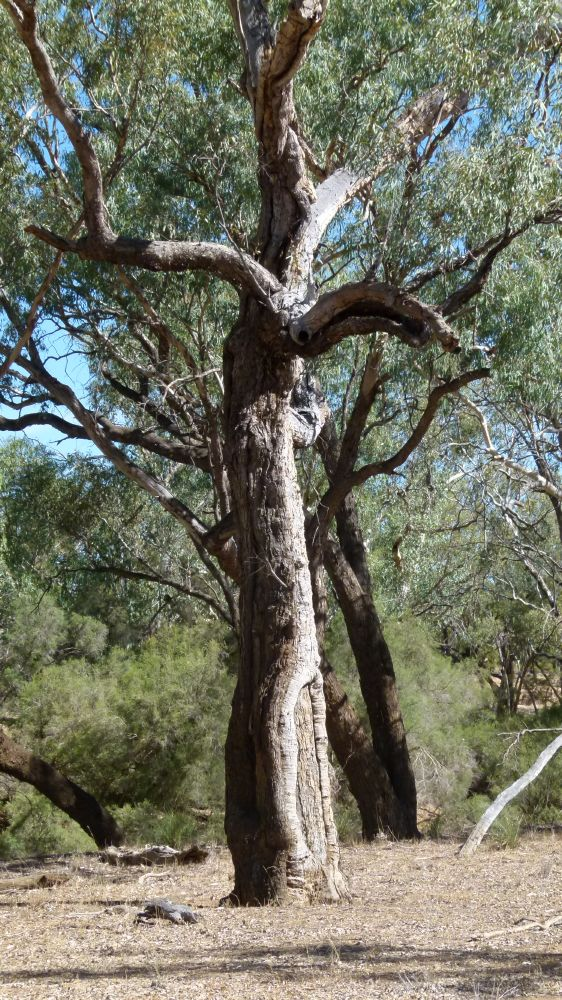
- Landsborough's Blazed Tree (Camp 69), 2015

- Location within Queensland
- 26.6761°S 146.158°E
- Location: Mitchell Highway, Bakers Bend, Shire of Murweh, Queensland, Australia

History
- Design period: 1840s–1860s (mid-19th century)

Site notes
- Architect: William Landsborough

Queensland Heritage Register
- Official name: Landsborough's Blazed Tree, Camp 69
- Type: state heritage (landscape)
- Designated: 18 June 2009
- Reference no.: 602715
- Significant period: 1860s
- Significant components: tree

Landsborough's Blazed Tree (Camp 69) is a heritage-listed blazed tree at Mitchell Highway, Bakers Bend, Shire of Murweh, Queensland, Australia. It was marked by William Landsborough. It was added to the Queensland Heritage Register on 18 June 2009.

== History ==
The blazed tree at Camp 69 south of Charleville was marked during William Landsborough's 1862 expedition south from the Gulf of Carpentaria in search of cross-continent explorers Robert O'Hara Burke and William John Wills.

Burke and Wills, who had set out from Melbourne on 20 August 1860 to cross the continent from south to north, were reported missing in June 1861. Four official relief expeditions were soon organised to search for them: Alfred William Howitt's party formed in Melbourne; John McKinlay's party formed in Adelaide; Frederick Walker's party formed in Rockhampton; and William Landsborough's party formed in Brisbane (appointed by the Victorian and Queensland Governments). The Victorian government appointed Captain William Henry Norman of HMCS Victoria as Commander-in-Chief of the Northern Expedition Parties (the Walker and Landsborough expeditions).

Howitt early ascertained the fate of Burke and Wills in September 1861, but the other expeditions had left before news could reach them.

William Landsborough, the son of a Scottish clergyman, was an experienced bushman, explorer and part owner of Bowen Downs station in northern Queensland. In the mid 1850s he was in partnership in a station on the Kolan River in the Burnett district and from 1856 had undertaken much private exploration in search of new pastoral land. He explored and named Mount Nebo in 1856, the Broadsound district in 1857, the Comet and Nogoa Rivers in 1858, and the Bonar (Bowen) River in 1859. From Rockhampton he and Nathaniel Buchanan then traced Aramac Creek and the Thomson River to the Plains of Promise. In 1861 he applied for 15 runs of 100 square miles (260 km^{2}) each on the Plains of Promise and with Buchanan and Edward Cornish formed the Landsborough River Co. to stock these runs, which he named Bowen Downs. He was recommended to lead the Brisbane expedition in search of Burke and Wills by the Queensland Surveyor-General, Augustus Charles Gregory.

On 26 August 1861 Landsborough's expedition left Brisbane in the brig Firefly for the Gulf of Carpentaria, where Walker and his party, who had proceeded overland from Rockhampton, was to rendezvous with Norman and Landsborough at the Albert River. On 4 September 1861 the Firefly was wrecked in the Gulf but the expedition was rescued three days later by Commander Norman in the Victoria.

A depot was established on the Albert River and during October, Landsborough explored the surrounding district, marking numerous trees with a distinctive broad arrow before the L.

Landsborough had instructions from the Royal Society of Victoria to search for Burke and Wills south-west from the Albert River. If that failed, he also intended to search for them along Cooper's Creek and then make for Brisbane or Rockhampton. As instructed, from mid-November 1861 to mid-January 1862 he explored south-west towards Central Mount Stuart, discovering and following the Gregory River, until near the site of later Camooweal he found desert with a network of dry channels. On 30 December 1861 he reached the furthest extent of his search. Realising that rain could flood the country and isolate his starving party Landsborough struggled back to the Albert River depot, having found no trace of Burke and Wills. During this journey Landsborough named the Gregory and Herbert (later Georgina) rivers, Lake Frances, Lake Mary and the Barkly Tableland and on his return reported the area well-suited for sheep raising.

Landsborough's explorations in this area contributed to the extension of Queensland's western boundary. At the time of separation from New South Wales in 1859, this had been set at longitude 141° East. In September 1860 AC Gregory had recommended to the Queensland Government that the border, which passed through the Plains of Promise, be moved to 138 East° to provide the district with access to a port in the Gulf. A year later, realising that the northern relief expeditions in search of Burke and Wills would increase knowledge of the area, Governor Bowen wrote on 5 September 1861 to the Secretary of State for the Colonies advising that Queensland legislature would protect any settlers who moved into the area, provided the western boundary of Queensland was extended to 138° East to include access to the Gulf. This was agreed to, and the boundary was altered on 12 April 1862, placing the Albert, Gregory and Herbert (Georgina) rivers and much of the Barkly Tableland, within Queensland.

On his return to the Albert on 19 January 1862 Landsborough discovered that Walker, who had reached the depot and reported finding tracks on the Flinders River to the south-east, had replenished his supplies from the Victoria and had left again to resuming the search. Landsborough had the option of returning south on the Victoria or proceeding overland. As provisions were now limited, Norman was opposed to Landsborough heading south, but the explorer ignored his advice, hoping to augment his provisions at new pastoral stations along the way.

The southern expedition comprised: Landsborough (commander), George Bourne (second in command), W Gleeson (a sailor by trade, but groom and cook to the expedition), Jemmy (a Queensland Native Police trooper originally from Deniliquin in New South Wales), Jacky (an Aboriginal guide from the Wide Bay district) and Fisherman (an Aboriginal guide from the Brisbane region). At 4pm on 10 February 1862 they commenced their journey south, taking 14 pack horses and 6 horses for riding. The party followed the river systems southward, averaging just over 20 miles (32 km) per day, and rarely travelled on a Sunday. For most of the journey they travelled through well-watered, grassed land, and the horses fared well for most of the journey.

It was Fisherman's job to mark the trees at each campsite. In an 1866 publication describing his experiences on this expedition, Landsborough commented: "The importance of marking trees properly cannot be overrated. The marks should be made only on strong, healthy trees, and at conspicuous points; and the directions should be unmistakably clear and accurate."

During February and March they followed the Flinders River south-east looking for traces of Burke and Wills. They traversed the Plains of Promise and named the isolated hills visible from the Flinders River: Fort Bowen, Mount Brown and Mount Little. By early April 1862 the party was on the Thomson River, which Landsborough had explored before, following this south. Having not found a station in this area, and with rations running low, Landsborough decided to leave the Thomson and on 10 April headed east via creeks to the Barcoo River/Cooper's Creek in the "known" districts. He relied heavily on the Aborigines in his party, who obtained the assistance of local Aboriginal guides for much of the distance. By 22 April the party was working down the Barcoo, and on the night of 22/23 April experienced their first and only attack by local Aborigines. Jemmy, the Native Police trooper, was on watch and raised the alarm, which saved their lives, the explorers frightening off their attackers with gunfire.

In late April 1862 Landsborough left the well-watered pastoral country along the Barcoo heading for the Nive River to the south-east, and on 1 May found old dray tracks – evidence that they had entered known country.

On 9 May Landsborough's party reached the upper reaches of the Warrego River, having found pastoralists' marked trees and deep horse tracks en route but no sign of an out-station, and that evening established Camp 67 on the left bank of a creek that they believed was the head of the Warrego. By this stage the party was starving and the next day (10 May) Landsborough made the decision to leave the Warrego and head south-south-east for the next river system in a more settled district. He had no local Aboriginal guides and for much of the time was without Jacky and Jemmy, who had backtracked to look for a missing pistol. After travelling about 50 miles (80 km) without finding water he decided to return to the Warrego. The horses became terribly distressed during this journey, being without water for 72 hours and travelling 120 miles (190 km) before water was found near the Warrego on 13 May (Camp 68). Here the party rested the next day, in part to refresh the horses and also to allow Jemmy, who had suffered a severe burn to his back after having rolled into a fire on the night of 10/11 May, to regain some strength. On 15 May the party left Camp 68 and in the evening established camp 69 on the west bank of a creek that fed into the Warrego River.

On the morning of 16 May the party left camp 69 to follow the Warrego downstream south-south-west. As Fisherman had to take Jemmy's place in rounding up the horses in the morning, he and Landsborough stayed behind the rest of the party to mark trees at the camp, catching up with the others in the evening.

On 21 May 1862, having continued to follow the Warrego downstream, Landsborough's party reached a station occupied by Williams and Neilsen, and learned that Burke and Wills had perished. Both Landsborough and George Bourne in their later accounts of the expedition expressed surprise on hearing that Burke and Wills had perished, having found the country well-watered for most of their journey.

From Williams and Neilson, Landsborough was able to re-provision the expedition before continuing south. His party arrived at Bunnawaunah on the Darling River, a settled district, on 1 June, and continued along well-known tracks via Menindie to Melbourne, which they reached in October 1862. In Melbourne Landsborough was feted as the first explorer to cross the Australian continent north to south, and a gold-mining town in Victoria was named in his honour.

Landsborough's reports on the valuable pastoral land he had encountered during the expedition sparked a rush for land in the Gulf country. However, the comparative ease with which his expedition had crossed the continent soon prompted rumour that he had been more interested in looking for new pastoral country than in searching for Burke and Wills. This he strenuously denied, and never applied for the lease of any of the pastoral country he had discovered during his crossing of the continent.

The success of Landsborough's 1862 expedition was due largely to his reliance on indigenous knowledge of the terrain he traversed. His journal reveals that he rarely travelled without Aboriginal guides; there are constant references to local Aborigines leading Landsborough's party to water or to showing them the best route, or to Jemmy, Jacky or Fisherman finding water. When he lost access to this local knowledge, as in his attempt to head south-south-east from the Warrego in May 1862 (camps 67–69), his party came close to perishing.

Landsborough later became a controversial police magistrate and commissioner of crown lands in Carpentaria, based at Burketown on the Albert River. Towards the end of his life he was awarded £2,000 for his Gulf country discoveries, which he used to purchase a property at Caloundra, just north of Brisbane, where he died in 1886.

William Landsborough has long been recognised for his contribution to the opening of western Queensland to European settlement: he has been included in Australian biographical dictionaries since the 1880s; both Queensland and Victoria have a town named in his honour; there is a Landsborough Creek south of Hughenden (a tributary of the Thomson River); the former Shire of Landsborough (later Caloundra City, and more recently Sunshine Coast Regional Council) was named after him; and numerous Queensland roads commemorate him, including the Landsborough Highway in western Queensland (linking Cloncurry, McKinlay, Kynuna, Winton, Longreach, Barcaldine, Blackall, Tambo, and Augathella with the Warrego Highway east of Charleville) and at least 15 other Landsborough roads and streets throughout the State.

== Description ==
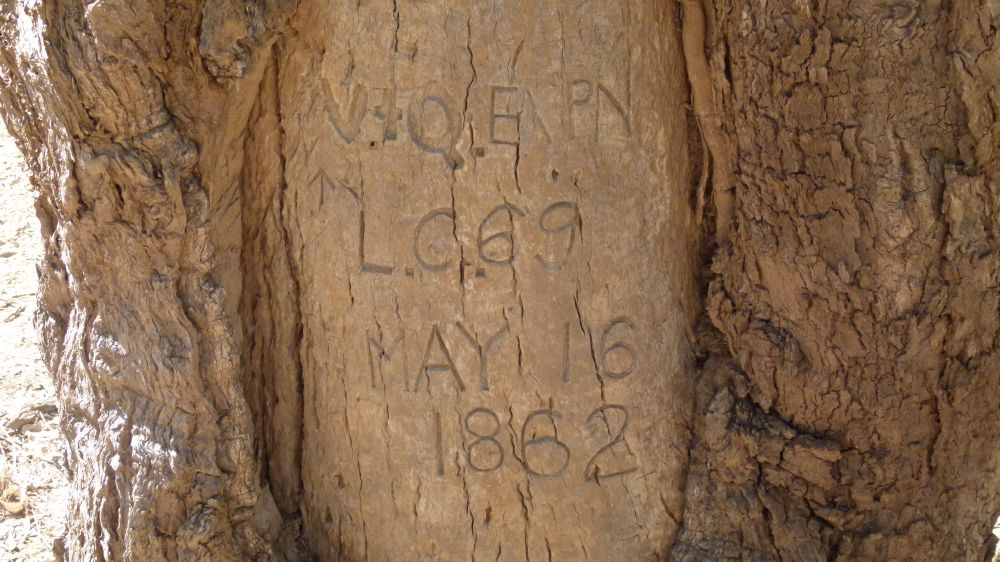
Close-up of the blaze, 2015

The blazed tree that marks Landsborough's Camp 69 is a coolibah located near a tributary of the Warrego River system on a grazing leasehold of just under 684 hectares (1,690 acres), about 29 kilometres (18 mi) south of Charleville off the Mitchell Highway near Bakers Bend.

The blaze on the trunk reads:

V.+Q. EXPN

L.C.69 MAY 16 1862

The lettering varies, perhaps evidence of one person starting the blaze and another completing it, with the "V+Q" being broader lettering than the remainder.

The blaze appears to be made on an existing Aboriginal scar, which Landsborough's party likely enlarged and cut to suit their needs.

== Heritage listing ==
Landsborough's Blazed Tree, Camp 69 was listed on the Queensland Heritage Register on 18 June 2009 having satisfied the following criteria.

The place is important in demonstrating the evolution or pattern of Queensland's history.

The blazed tree at Landsborough's Camp 69 just south of Charleville was marked on 16 May 1862 and is important for its association with the first official crossing of the Australian continent from north to south. Between February and May 1862 explorer William Landsborough left a trail of blazed trees from the Albert River in the Gulf of Carpentaria to the Warrego River near later Cunnamulla, demonstrating a practical route for driving livestock overland to north-western Queensland. Comparatively few of the blazes survive, either having grown over or trees destroyed through past clearing practices, fire, flood, termites or harsh environmental conditions. Surviving blazes associated with this expedition remain important makers of a major event in Queensland history, which precipitated a rush for pastoral land in western and north-western Queensland in the early 1860s. There are only two known surviving examples of blazed trees from the 1862 Landsborough expedition in the Charleville district, at Camp 67 and Camp 69. The lettering on these blazes remains extremely well preserved.

The place demonstrates rare, uncommon or endangered aspects of Queensland's cultural heritage.

The blaze at Camp 69, which remains visible, is rare tangible evidence of Landsborough and his party's expedition as the first exploration expedition to cross the continent from north to south, opening much of western and north-western Queensland to pastoral settlement.

The place has a special association with the life or work of a particular person, group or organisation of importance in Queensland's history.

The place has a special association with the work of William Landsborough (1825–1886) in exploring the western and north western districts of Queensland in 1861–1862.
