= Wyandra, Queensland =

Wyandra
- Town
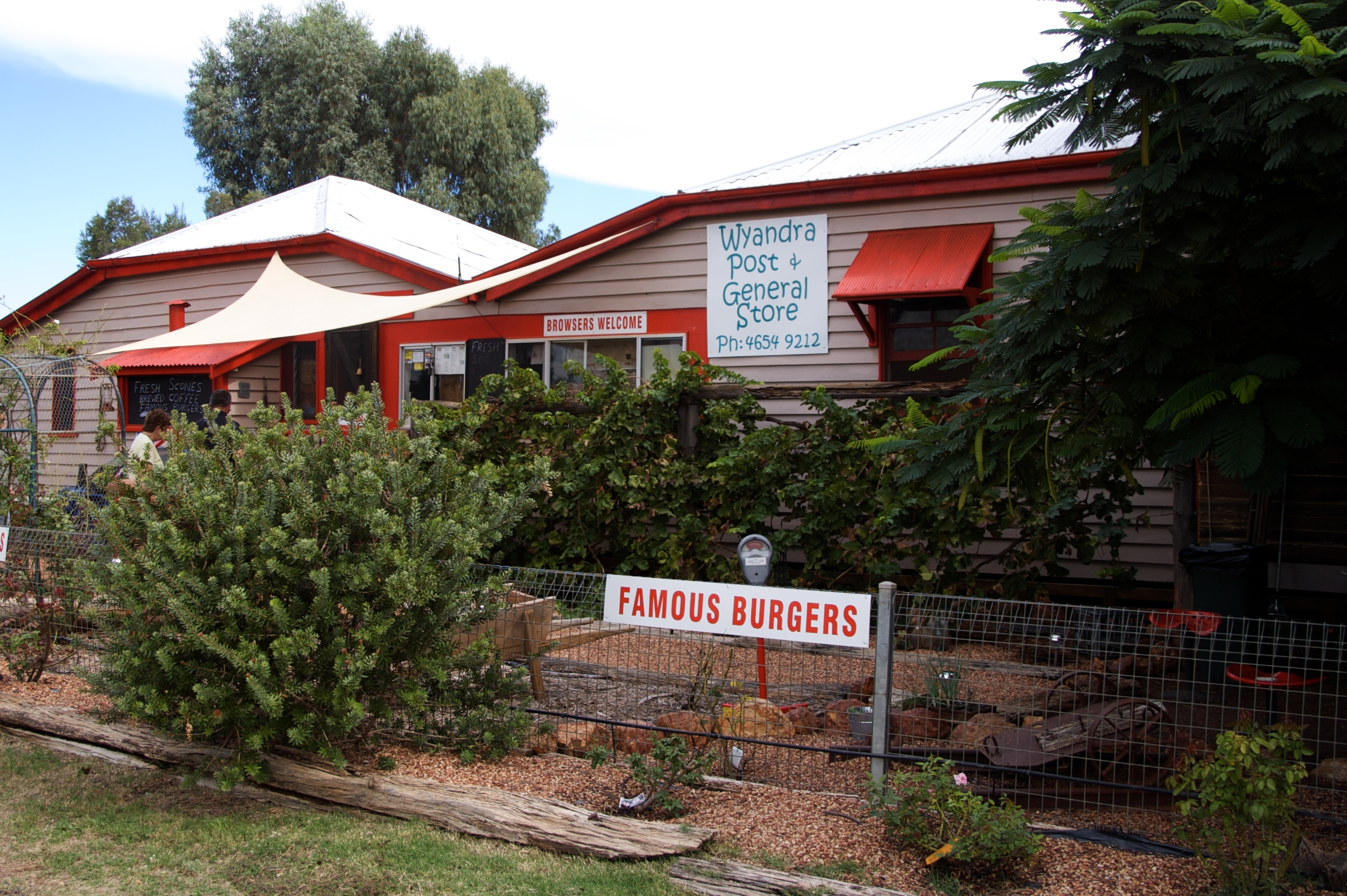
- Wyandra General Store, 2009

- Interactive map of Wyandra
- Coordinates: 27.2463°S 145.9783°E
- Country: Australia
- State: Queensland
- LGA: Paroo Shire
- Location: 86.2 km (53.6 mi) NNE of Cunnamulla; 113 km (70 mi) SSW of Charleville; 344 km (214 mi) WNW of St George; 379 km (235 mi) WSW of Roma; 857 km (533 mi) W of Brisbane

Government
  - State electorate: Warrego
  - Federal division: Maranoa

Area
  - Total: 5,069.5 km^{2} (1,957.3 sq mi)

Population
  - Total: 78 (2021 census)
  - Density: 0.01539/km^{2} (0.03985/sq mi)
- Time zone: UTC+10:00 (AEST)
- Postcode: 4489
Localities around Wyandra
| Murweh; Cooladdi | Bakers Bend | Riversleigh |
| Humeburn | Wyandra | Boatman; Nebine |
| Humeburn | Coongoola | Linden |

Wyandra is a rural town and locality in the Shire of Paroo, Queensland, Australia. In the 2021 census, the locality of Wyandra had a population of 78 people.

== Geography ==
The Warrego River flows from north to south through the locality. The Mitchell Highway also passes from north to south through the locality to the east and roughly parallel with the river. The town is in roughly the centre of the locality just to the east of the river and west of the highway, 827 kilometres (514 mi) west of the state capital, Brisbane and 110 kilometres (68 mi) north of Cunnamulla.

== History ==
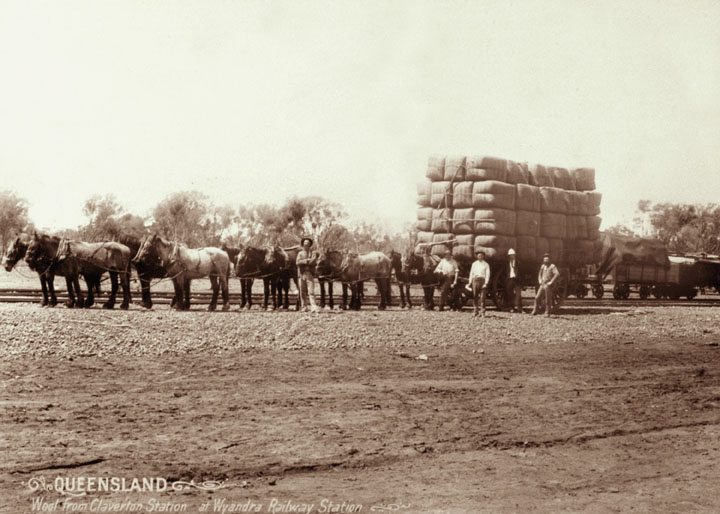
Wool bales from Claverton Station at Wyandra Railway Station, circa 1897

The region was first colonised by the British in 1861 when Henry and Frederick Weaver formed the Claverton Downs pastoral run on the Warrego River. The Weavers were from the English town of Bath, and named their property after Claverton Down near Bath.

In the mid 1860s the Claverton Native Police barracks were established on Claverton Downs.

Claverton was renamed Wyandra in 1896.

The town grew with the completion of the Western railway line from Charleville in 1897 and quickly became a centre for local grazing properties.

The Wyandra Provisional School opened on 10 February 1898 and became Wyandra State School on 1 January 1909.

In February 1921, the citizens of Wyandra erected a war memorial on the corner of Macks and Warrego Streets in honour of those residents of the district who served in the military during World War I. The memorial has a digger statue and lists the names of the 23 who enlisted and commemorates the three who died.

A powerhouse was established in 1955 with generators that came from Cunnamulla. Wyandra was connected to the state electricity grid in 1970. The obsolete powerhouse was placed on Standby and later converted into a museum.

== Demographics ==
In the 2006 census, the locality of Wyandra had a population of 116 people.

In the 2016 census, the locality of Wyandra had a population of 99 people.

In the 2021 census, the locality of Wyandra had a population of 78 people.

== Media ==
Wyandra receives transmissions from the following radio stations:

- ABC Radio Western Queensland – 603 AM
- 4VL (Resonate Radio) – 93.9 FM
- ABC Radio National – 106.1 FM

The Australian Broadcasting Corporation transmits ABC and its sister Channels, ABC Kids, ABC Family, ABC Entertains and ABC News to Wyandra through its Cunnamulla relay station, ABCAQ, situated at 28°2′54″S 145°42′6″E.

The Seven Network and its sister channels 7two, 7mate and 7flix transmit to Wyandra through its regional area affiliate, ITQ.

Network 10 and its sister channels 10 Drama, 10 Comedy and Nickelodeon transmit to Wyandra through its regional area affiliate, CDT.

The Nine Network and its sister channels 9Gem, 9Go! and 9Rush transmit to Wyandra through its regional area affiliate, Imparja Television.

The Special Broadcasting Service and its sister channels SBS2, SBS World Movies and SBS Food also transmit to Wyandra.

== Facilities ==
Paroo Shire Council operates Wyandra Library at Macks Street.

Wyandra has the Powerhouse Museum. The Wyandra hall has a park behind the hall and public toilets in front of the hall. There is a free caravan park behind the school.

== Education ==
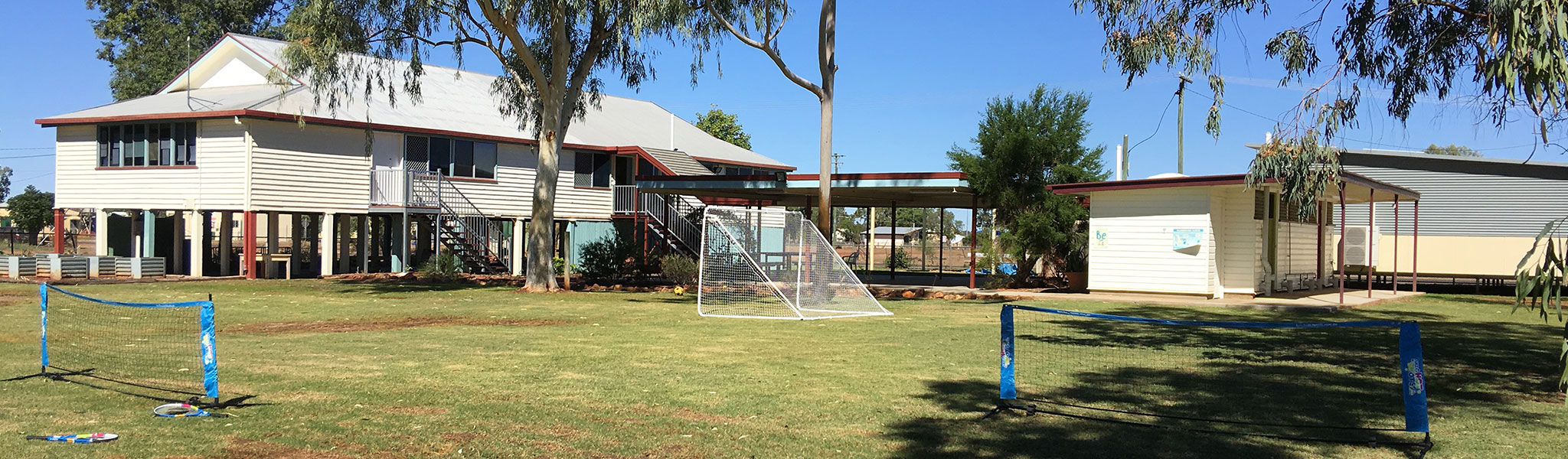
Wyandra State School, 2023

Wyandra State School is a government primary (Early Childhood to Year 6) school for boys and girls at Moody Street (27.2454°S 145.9779°E). In 2017, the school had an enrolment of 4 students with 1 teacher and 2 non-teaching staff (1 full-time equivalent).

There is no secondary school in Wyandra; the nearest are Charleville State High School in Charleville and Cunnamulla P–12 State School in Cunnamulla (both approximately 125 kilometres (78 mi) away). The alternatives are distance education and boarding school.
