= Chelsea Jane =

Australian rapper and songwriter

- Also known as: Queen of the hill, Chels Bredhauer
- Born: Chelsea Jane Bredhauer; 16 December 1992 (age 33); Charleville, Queensland
- Origin: Australia
- Genres: Hip hop
- Occupations: Rapper, Songwriter
- Instrument: Vocal
- Years active: 2010–present

Chelsea Jane Bredhauer better known by her stage name Chelsea Jane (born 16 December 1992) is an Australian rapper and songwriter from Charleville, Queensland. She is known for having won the 2013 Australasian Performing Right Association (APRA) Hilltop Hoods Initiative.

== Biography ==
Born and bred out west in Charleville, Chelsea moved to Toowoomba where she boarded at Downlands College for two and half years, before finishing high school at The Scots PGC College in Warwick. She was the first female to be given the award for emerging rap artists, cementing her ability and style as one to watch.

After leaving school she began studying criminology at Bond University on the Gold Coast and it was here that she discovered the enjoyment of writing for the rap scene, with its distinctive chanted rhyming lyrics. Rap battles, a friendly "dissing" of an opponent and entertaining a crowd, a la Muhammad Ali, were Chelsea's way of getting known in the scene, and she has been a guest judge at rap battles in Sydney and Adelaide as well as travelling overseas to the US, Canada and the UK to connect with well-known artists. One of her breakthroughs came when she was visiting her brother Jack on the rodeo circuit in Canada. Hip hop supergroup ATLien Workshop weren't far away in Atlanta, so she flew down to write some verse with them, which was done in 20 minutes and then recorded. She's built on the national and international attention by being announced as the recipient of the 2013 Hilltop Hoods initiative, worth $10,000. The first female to win this award for emerging rap artists.

Writing's very therapeutic, it's my way of relaxing. I've been told I don't sound how I look. People see a girl with pink hair and they think I'm innocent, but when I hear a beat, the demon comes out in me.

She said her father, Charleville identity Kevin "Blue" Bredhauer, was not "hip hop affiliated" but he fully supported everything she did.

He tells me I should find a boyfriend but do you know how hard it is to find someone who understands what I do.

== Discography ==
=== Albums ===
- Ascension (2019)
