= Town of Charleville =

Local government area of Queensland, Australia

Coordinates: 26.37°S 146.24°E

The Town of Charleville is a former local government area in the Maranoa area of Queensland, Australia. It existed from 1894 to 1960.

== History ==
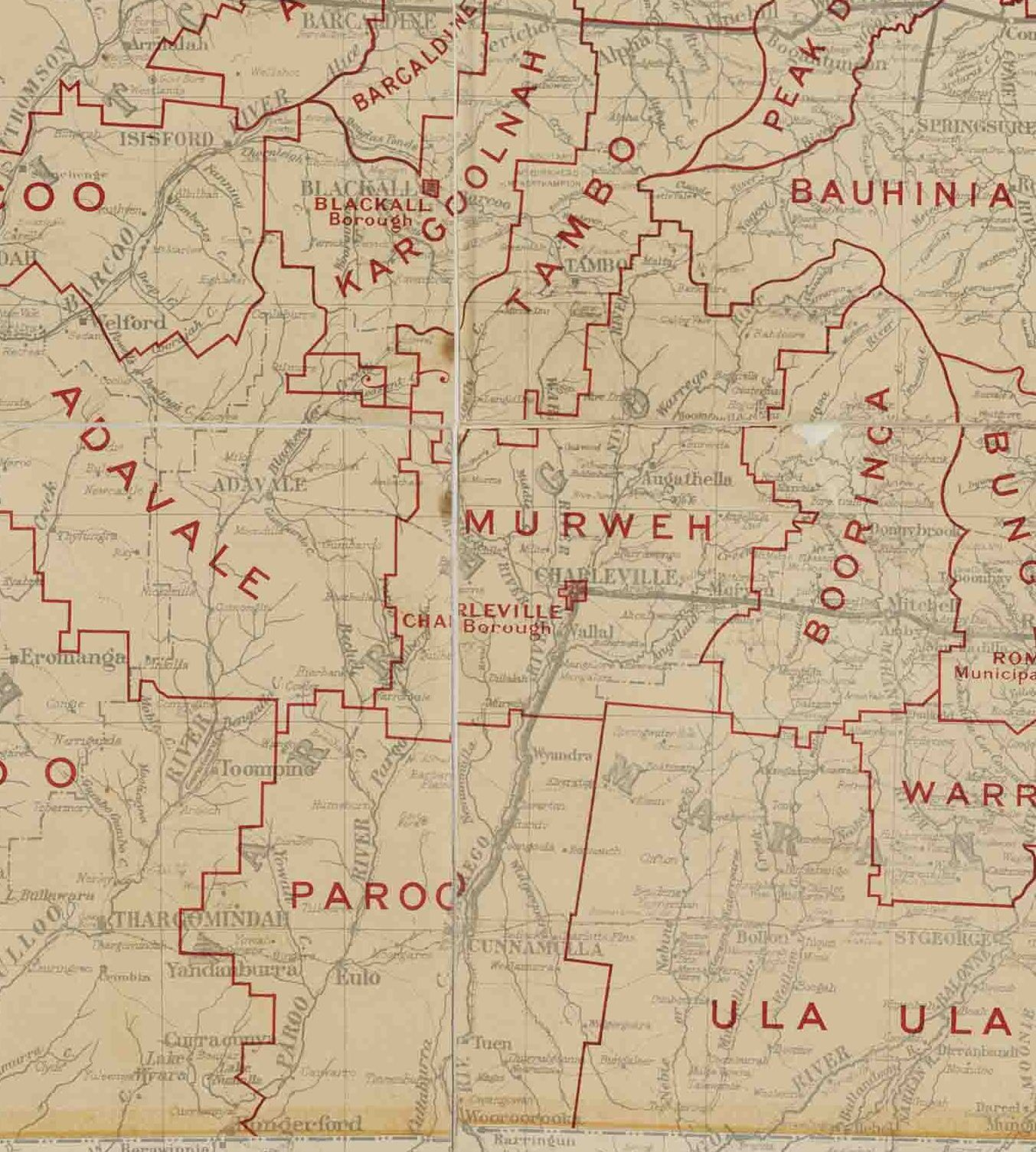
Map of Borough of Charleville and adjacent local government areas, March 1902

Murweh Division was created on 11 November 1879 as one of 74 divisions of Queensland under the Divisional Boards Act 1879.

On 21 March 1894, under the "Local Government Act 1878", Subdivision 2 of the Murweh Division was separated to create a municipality called Borough of Charleville.

With the passage of the Local Authorities Act 1902, the Borough of Charleville became the Town of Charleville on 31 March 1903.

On 10 September 1960, the Town of Charleville which had been separated from Murweh Division in 1894, was absorbed back into Shire of Murweh (the successor of Murweh Division).

== Town Hall ==
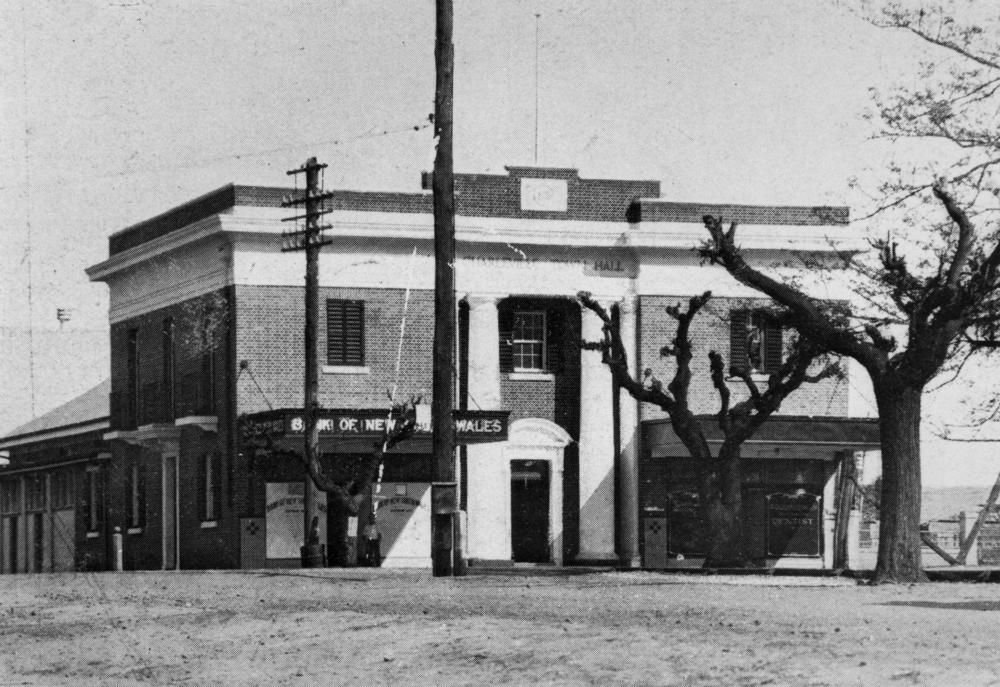
Town Hall, Charleville, 1933

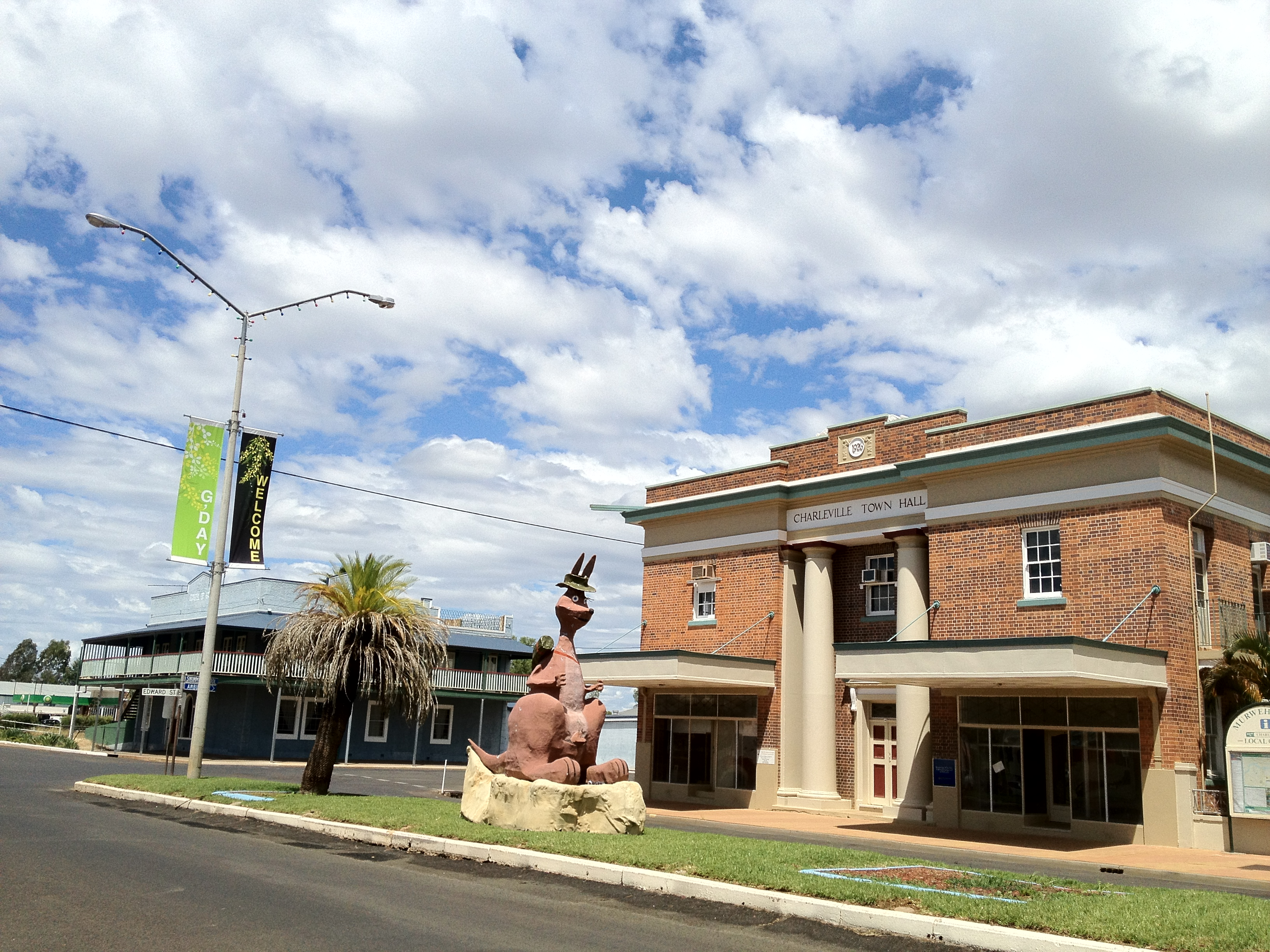
Town Hall, Charleville, 2012

The Charleville Town Hall was built in 1927 and was officially opened on 30 June 1927 by the mayor S. J. Brassington, followed by a celebratory ball. it suffered extensive structural damage during the 1990 Charleville Flood which devastated Charleville but held firm during the 1997, 2008 and 2009 floods. it suffered moderate damage during the 2010 flood.

== Mayors ==
- 1926: James Thomas Frawley
- 1927: Samuel John Brassington
- 1930–1936: O. J. Allen
