= Bakers Bend =

- Suburb
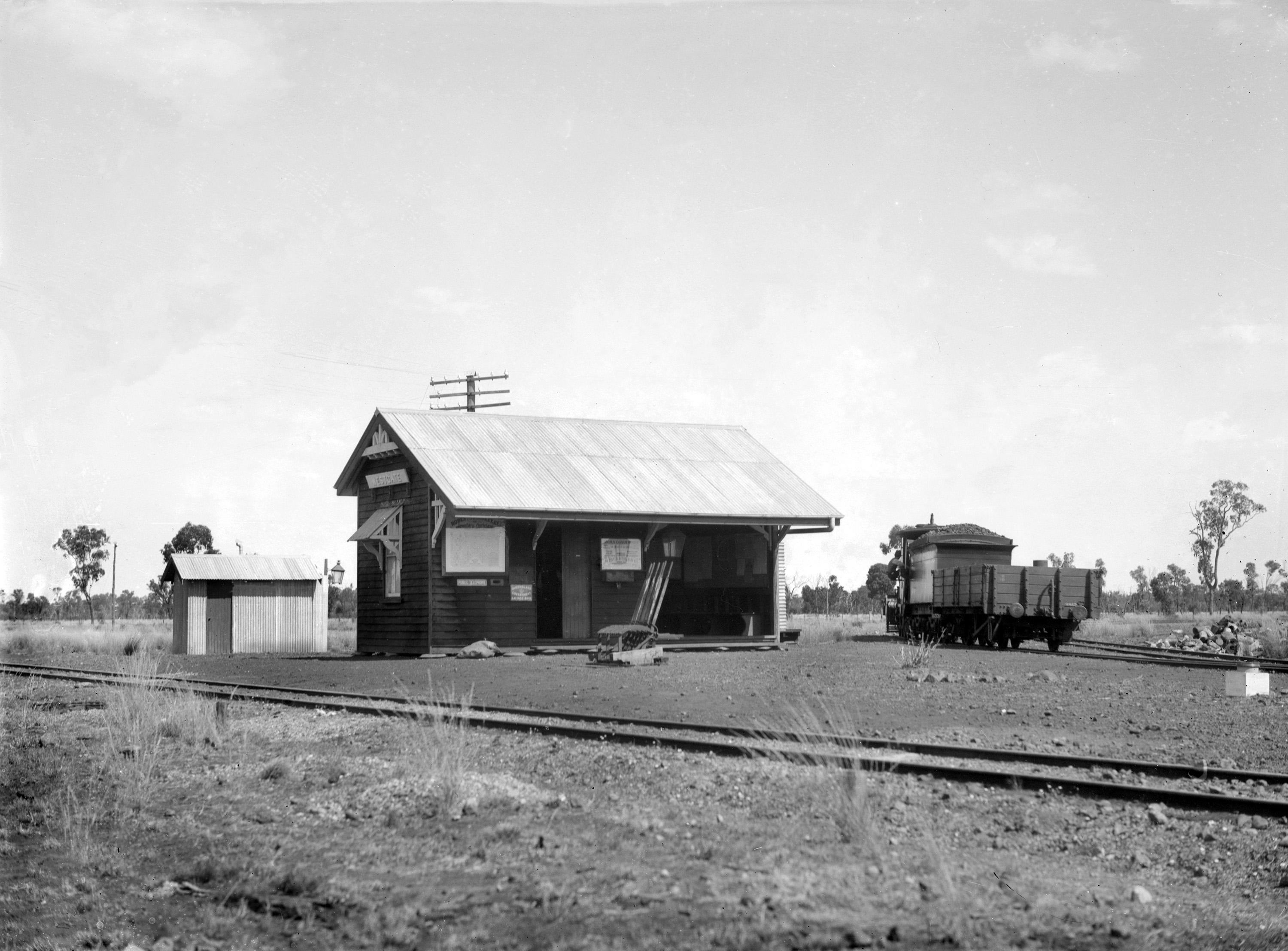
- Westgate railway station, 1930

- Interactive map of Bakers Bend
- Coordinates: 26.7333°S 146.0811°E
- Country: Australia
- State: Queensland
- LGA: Shire of Murweh
- Location: 42.4 km (26.3 mi) SSW of Charleville; 308 km (191 mi) W of Roma; 784 km (487 mi) ENE of Brisbane

Government
  - State electorate: Warrego
  - Federal division: Maranoa

Area
  - Total: 2,029.2 km^{2} (783.5 sq mi)

Population
  - Total: 7 (2021 census)
  - Density: 0.00345/km^{2} (0.0089/sq mi)
- Time zone: UTC+10:00 (AEST)
- Postcode: 4470
Suburbs around Bakers Bend
Ward	Charleville	Sommariva
Cooladdi	Bakers Bend	Riversleigh
Murweh	Wyandra	Riversleigh

Bakers Bend is a rural locality in the Shire of Murweh, Queensland, Australia. In the 2021 census, Bakers Bend had a population of 7 people.

The locality contains two abandoned towns, both in the north of the locality:

- Westgate (26.5844°S 146.1902°E)
- Wallal (26.6153°S 146.1261°E)

== Geography ==
The Warrego River enter the locality from the north (Charleville) and then meanders southward, and exits to the south-west (Murweh). The locality is within the Murray-Darling drainage basin.

The Mitchell Highway enters the locality from the north (Charleville) and runs loosely parallel and east of the river, exiting to the south (Murweh).

The Western railway line enters the locality from the north (Charlevillle) and proceeds south to Westgate immediately west of the highland where the line now terminates. There were a number of railway stations serving the locality, but only one station (Westgate) is still operational as the line now terminates at Westgate. The complete list is:

- Westgate railway station, operational (26.5867°S 146.1936°E)
- on the Western railway line (from north to south
  - Wallal railway station, abandoned (26.6515°S 146.1763°E)
  - Mangalore railway station, abandoned (26.7865°S 146.0958°E)
  - Dillalah railway station, abandoned (26.8712°S 146.0652°E)
- on the Great Western railway line (from east to west)
  - Warrego River railway station, abandoned (26.5899°S 146.1234°E)
  - Myendetta railway station, abandoned (26.5869°S 146.0038°E)

The land use is grazing on native vegetation.

== Demographics ==
In the 2016 census, Bakers Bend had a population of 28 people.

In the 2021 census, Bakers Bend had a population of 7 people.

== Heritage listings ==
Bakers Bend has a number of heritage-listed sites, including:

- Myendetta Homestead, off the Diamantina Developmental Road (26.5662°S 146.0228°E)
- Landsborough's Blazed Tree (Camp 69), off the Mitchell Highway (26.6761°S 146.158°E)

== Education ==
There are no schools in Bakers Bend. The nearest government primary schools are Charleville State School in neighbouring Charleville to the north and Wyandra State School in neighbouring Wyandra to the south. The nearest government secondary school is Charleville State High School, also in Charleville. There is also a Catholic primary school in Charleville. However, for some students in the locality, all of these schools may be too distant for a daily commute with the alternatives being distance education and boarding school.
