= Westgate, Queensland =

Westgate Queensland
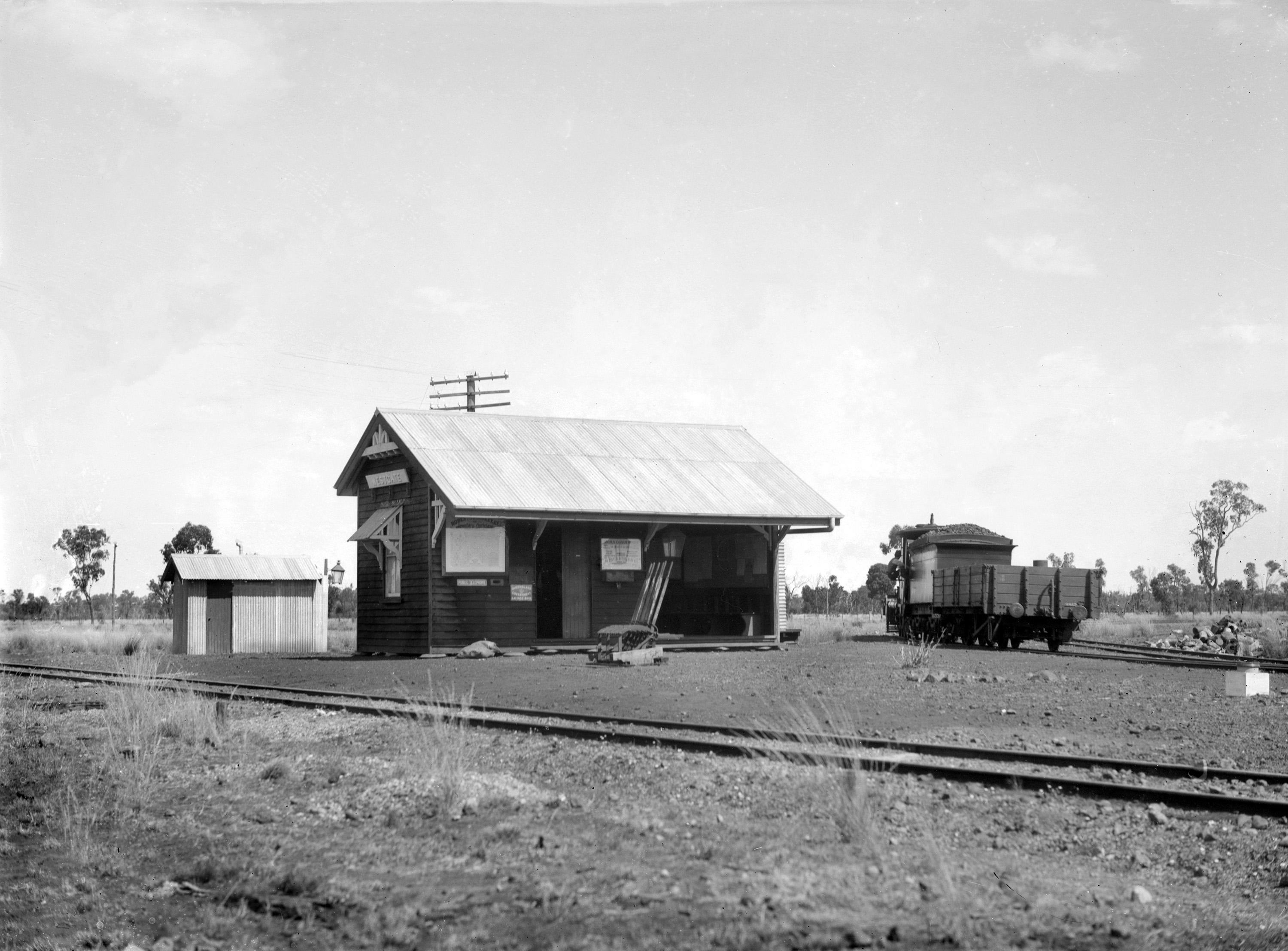
- Westgate railway station, 1930

- Coordinates: 26.5844°S 146.1902°E
- Established: 1911
- Postcode(s): 4470
- Elevation: 290 m (951 ft)
- Time zone: AEST (UTC+10:00)
- Location: 22.6 km (14 mi) SSW of Charleville; 190 km (118 mi) NNE of Cunnamulla; 233 km (145 mi) E of Quilpie; 766 km (476 mi) W of Brisbane
- LGA(s): Shire of Murweh
- State electorate(s): Warrego
- Federal division(s): Maranoa

Westgate is an unoccupied town in the locality of Bakers Bend in the Shire of Murweh, Queensland, Australia.

== Geography ==
The town of Westgate is to the north of the branch line to Quilpie from the Western railway line. As at November 2018, it appears to be without any buildings or structures (apart from the railway line). Although the town plan show streets, there is no visual evidence of those streets having been established.

== History ==
The town's name is derived from the railway station name, assigned by the Queensland Railways Department on 18 November 1911, as the junction name for the line to Quilpie, from the Charleville to Cunnamulla line.

The town is first shown on a 1913 survey plan. Queensland electoral rolls show a large number of railway construction workers living in a camp in 1913, constructing the railway line. In 1922, the electoral roll shows a small number of railway workers living there, presumably operating and maintaining the line. After that, there appears to be no permanent population.
