= Riversleigh, Queensland =

Riversleigh
- Suburb
- Interactive map of Riversleigh
- Coordinates: 26.8122°S 146.4880°E
- Country: Australia
- State: Queensland
- LGA: Shire of Murweh
- Location: 71.0 km (44.1 mi) SSE of Charleville; 337 km (209 mi) WSW of Roma; 687 km (427 mi) WNW of Toowoomba; 814 km (506 mi) WNW of Brisbane

Government
  - State electorate: Warrego
  - Federal division: Maranoa

Area
  - Total: 2,524.9 km^{2} (974.9 sq mi)

Population
  - Total: 6 (2021 census)
  - Density: 0.00238/km^{2} (0.0062/sq mi)
- Time zone: UTC+10:00 (AEST)
- Postcode: 4470
Suburbs around Riversleigh
Charleville	Sommariva	Morven
Bakers Bend	Riversleigh	Boatman
Wyandra	Wyandra	Boatman

Riversleigh is a rural locality in the Shire of Murweh, Queensland, Australia. In the 2021 census, Riversleigh had a population of 6 people.

== Geography ==
The Warrego Highway passes to the north and the Mitchell Highway to the west. The Bollon Charleville Road enters the locality from the south-east (Boatman) and exits to the north-east (Charleville).

The land use is grazing on native vegetation.

== History ==
The locality takes its name from the parish, which in turn took its name from a pastoral station. The name appears on the 1887 Post Master General's map of Queensland. The name of the pastoral station is thought to reflect its situation on Angellala Creek, near its junction with the Warrego River. The locality was officially bounded on 28 March 2002.

== Demographics ==
In the 2016 census, Riversleigh had a population of 16 people.

In the 2021 census, Riversleigh had a population of 6 people.

== Education ==
There are no schools in Riversleigh. The nearest government primary schools are Charleville State School in neighbouring Charleville to the north-west and Wyandra State School in neighbouring Wyandra to the south-west. The nearest government secondary school is Charleville State High School, also in Charleville. There is also a Catholic primary school in Charleville. However, some parts of Riversleigh would be too distant to attend these schools; the alternatives are distance education and boarding school.
