= Shire of Murweh =

Coordinates: 26°24′06″S 146°14′23″E

- Local government area
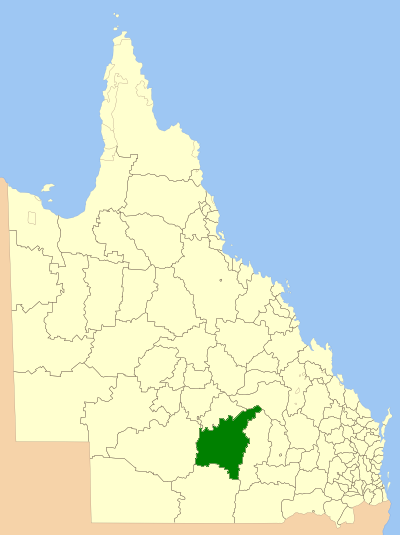
- Location of the shire within Queensland

- Interactive map of Shire of Murweh
- Country: Australia
- State: Queensland
- Region: South West Queensland
- Established: 1879
- Council seat: Charleville

Government
  - Mayor: Shaun Radnedge
  - State electorate: Warrego
  - Federal division: Maranoa

Area
  - Total: 40,700 km^{2} (15,700 sq mi)

Population
  - Total: 3,971 (2021 census)
  - Density: 0.09757/km^{2} (0.2527/sq mi)
- Website: Shire of Murweh
LGAs around Shire of Murweh
Blackall-Tambo	Blackall-Tambo	Central Highlands
Quilpie	Shire of Murweh	Maranoa
Paroo	Paroo	Paroo

The Shire of Murweh is a local government area in the Maranoa district, which is part of South West Queensland, Australia. The administrative centre and largest town in the shire is Charleville.

In the 2021 census, the Shire of Murweh had a population of 3,971 people.

== History ==
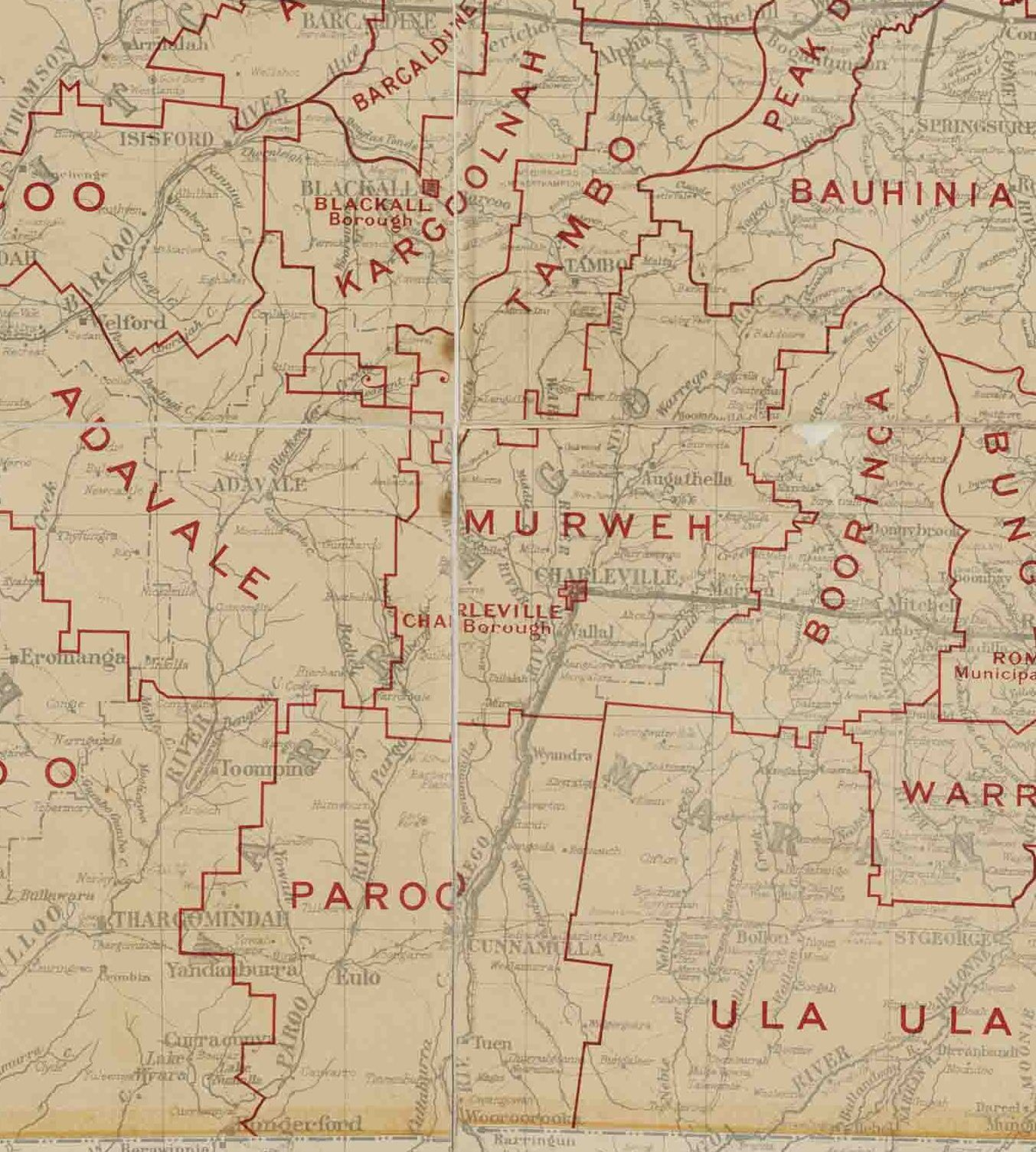
Map of Murweh Division and adjacent local government areas, March 1902

Bidjara (Bidyara, Pitjara, Peechara) is an Australian Aboriginal language spoken by the Bidjara people. The Bidjara language region includes the landscape within the local government boundaries of the Murweh Shire Council, particularly the towns of Charleville, Augathella and Blackall as well as the properties of Nive Downs and Mount Tabor.

Murweh Division was created on 11 November 1879 as one of 74 divisions of Queensland under the Divisional Boards Act 1879 with a population of 1286.

On 11 October 1883, there was an adjustment of boundaries between Tambo Division and Murweh Division.

On 5 February 1889, the western part of Murweh Division was separated to create the new Adavale Division.

On 21 March 1894, under the "Local Government Act 1878", Subdivision 2 of the Murweh Division was separated to create a municipality called Borough of Charleville.

With the passage of the Local Authorities Act 1902, Murweh Division became the Shire of Murweh on 31 March 1903.

On 10 September 1960, the Town of Charleville (the successor of the Borough of Charleville) which had been separated from Murweh Division in 1894, was absorbed back into the Shire of Murweh .

== Towns and localities ==
The Shire of Murweh includes the following towns and localities:

- Charleville
- Augathella
- Bakers Bend
- Boatman
- Caroline Crossing
- Clara Creek
- Cooladdi (Ghost Town)
- Gowrie Station
- Langlo
- Morven
- Murweh
- Nive
- Redford
- Riversleigh
- Sommariva
- Tyrconnel
- Upper Warrego
- Wallal
- Ward
- Westgate

== Amenities ==
Murweh Shire Council operates public libraries in Augathella, Charleville and Morven. all three of these libraries have access to the internet through a high speed ISDN Broadband Internet Connection (provided through the National Broadband Network) to Brisbane.

The Murweh Shire Council operates the Charleville Airport and the aerodromes in Augathella, Morven and Cooladdi.

Murweh Shire Council also owns and operates these parks and recreational facilities throughout the shire

Augathella

- Brassington Park, Bendee Street, Augathella
- Meat Ant Park, 73 Main Street, Augathella
- Warrego Park, Corner Welch and Main Streets, Augathella

Charleville

- Graham Andrews Parkland, Sturt Street (Mitchell Highway), Charleville
- Baker Street Reserve, Baker Street, Charleville
- King Edward Park (original Charleville Showgrounds), Parry Street, Charleville
- Charleville Showgrounds, Partridge Street, Charleville (near Charleville State High School)
- Anzac Park, Wills Street, Charleville

Morven

- Memorial Park, Albert Street, Morven
- Morven Recreation Grounds (encompassing Sadlier's Waterhole), Corner Nebine Road and Old Charleville Road, Morven

== Demographics ==
Year	Population	Notes
1879	1,286	
1933	6,141	
1947	5,930	
1954	7,532	
1961	7,845	
1966	7,483	
1971	6,053	
1976	5,585	
1981	5,338	
1986	5,287	
1991	5,291	
1996	4,962	
2001 census	4,962	
2006 census	4,580	
2011 census	4,619	
2016 census	4,307	
2021 census	3,971	

== Shire Chambers ==
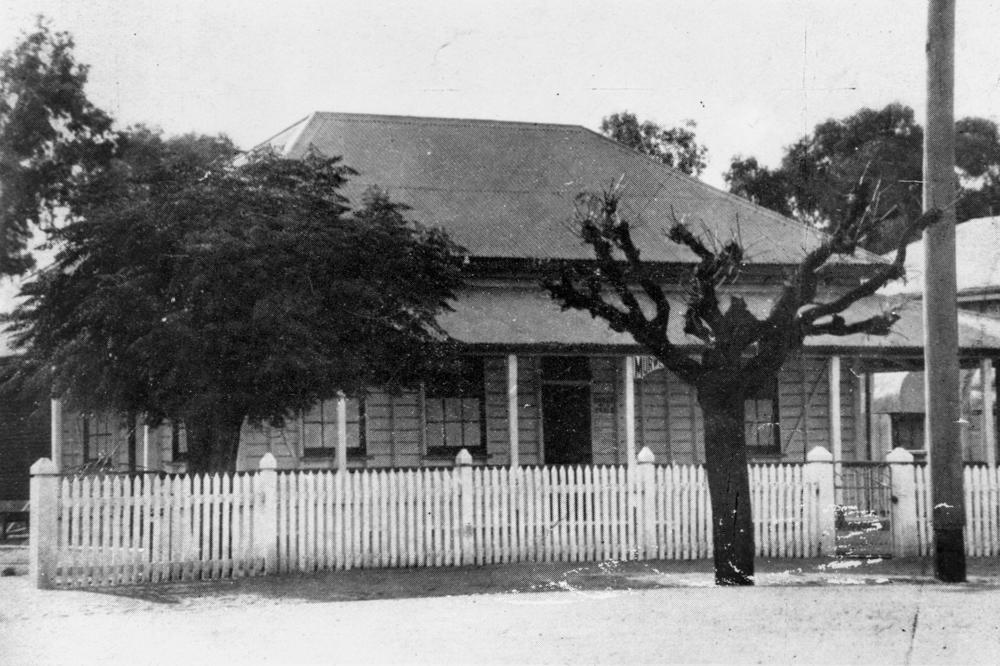
Murweh Shire Council Chambers, 1933

The first Murweh council chambers were built in the 1880s but were destroyed by fire in the 1930s.

The new Murweh Shire Council Chambers were opened in Alfred Street in February 1938 by the shire chairman William Herbert Corbett. The architects were Hall and Phillips and the contractor was T. E. Woollon of Brisbane.

The chambers suffered extensive damage during the 1990 flood which devastated Charleville. Repairs were carried out by Q-Build in late 1990. These repairs held fast in the 1997 flood that hit Charleville, but suffered moderate damage during the 2010 flood that hit Charleville.

== Chairmen and mayors ==
- 1911–1934: J.W.S Gildea Esq.
- 1935–1946: William Henry Corbett
- 1946–1955: Arthur Carruthers Little
- 1955–1958: Reginald Bowen Lynch
- 1958–1965: Mr. F.O Elliott
- 1965–1976: Clement Edmund Francis O.B.E
- 1976–1978: John Albert Aiken
- 1978–1982: Frances Muriel Hayden
- 1982–1985: Michael Phillip Gordon
- 1985–2001: Graham Andrews
- 2001–2004: Wendy Choice-Brooks
- 2004–2012: Mark Arthur O'Brien
- 2012–2016: Denis Michael Cook
- 2016–2020: Annie Liston
- 2020 - Present: Shaun Radnedge
