= Charleville, Queensland =

Charleville
- Town
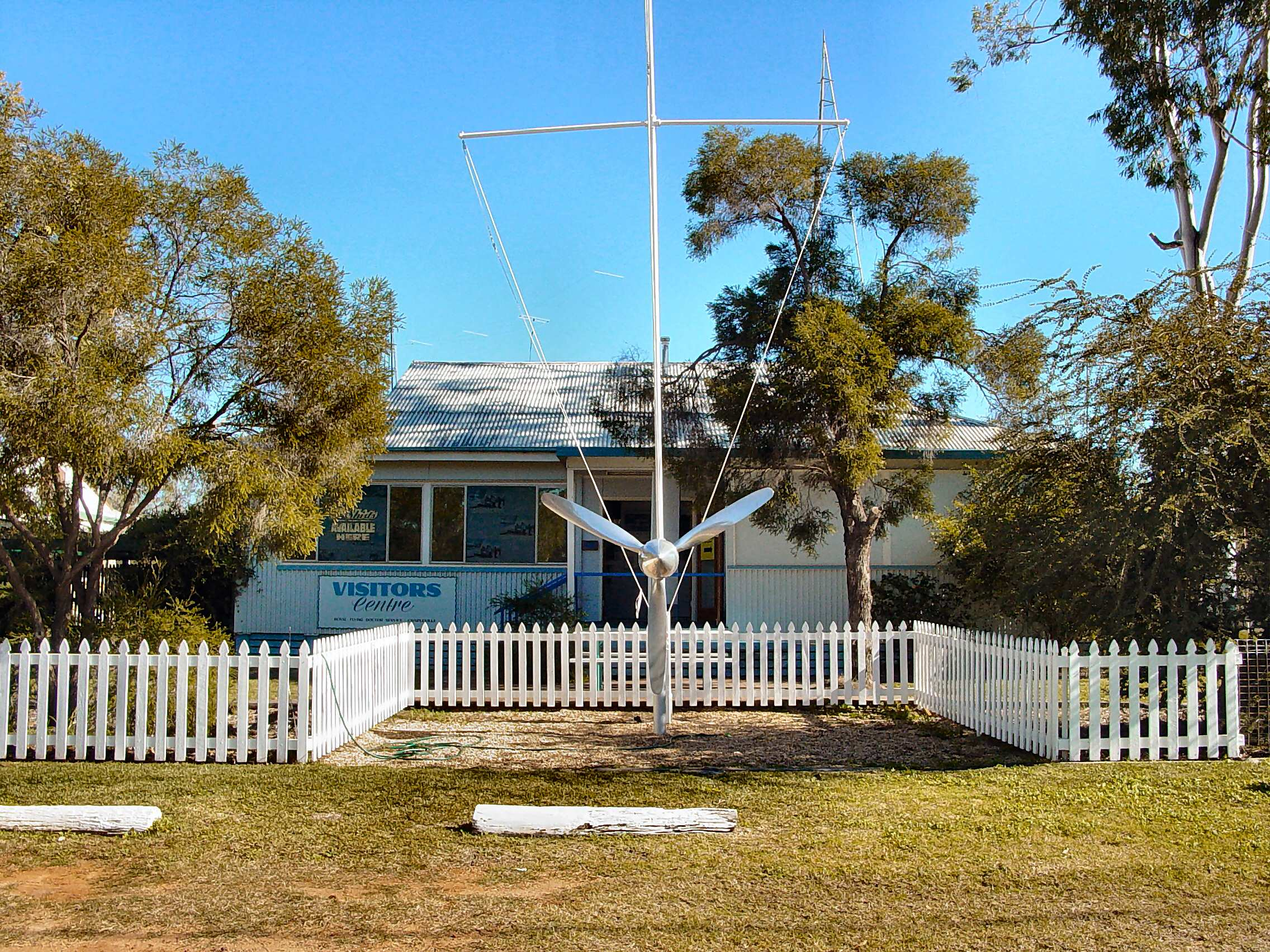
- The Royal Flying Doctor Service visitor centre at Charleville

- Interactive map of Charleville
- Coordinates: 26.4016°S 146.2383°E
- Country: Australia
- State: Queensland
- LGA: Shire of Murweh
- Location: 199 km (124 mi) N of Cunnamulla; 267 km (166 mi) W of Roma; 515 km (320 mi) SE of Longreach; 637 km (396 mi) WNW of Toowoomba; 745 km (463 mi) WNW of Brisbane
- Established: 1865

Government
  - State electorate: Warrego
  - Federal division: Maranoa

Area
  - Total: 613.5 km^{2} (236.9 sq mi)
- Elevation: 293.5 m (963 ft)

Population
  - Total: 2,992 (2021 census)
  - Density: 4.8769/km^{2} (12.6312/sq mi)
- Time zone: UTC+10:00 (AEST)
- Postcode: 4470
- Mean max temp: 28.0 °C (82.4 °F)
- Mean min temp: 13.9 °C (57.0 °F)
- Annual rainfall: 497.4 mm (19.58 in)
Localities around Charleville
Ward	Gowrie Station	Gowrie Station
Ward	Charleville	Sommariva
Bakers Bend	Bakers Bend	Riversleigh

Charleville (/ˈtʃɑːrlvɪl/) is a rural town and locality in the Shire of Murweh, Queensland, Australia. In the 2021 census, the locality of Charleville had a population of 2,992.

== History ==
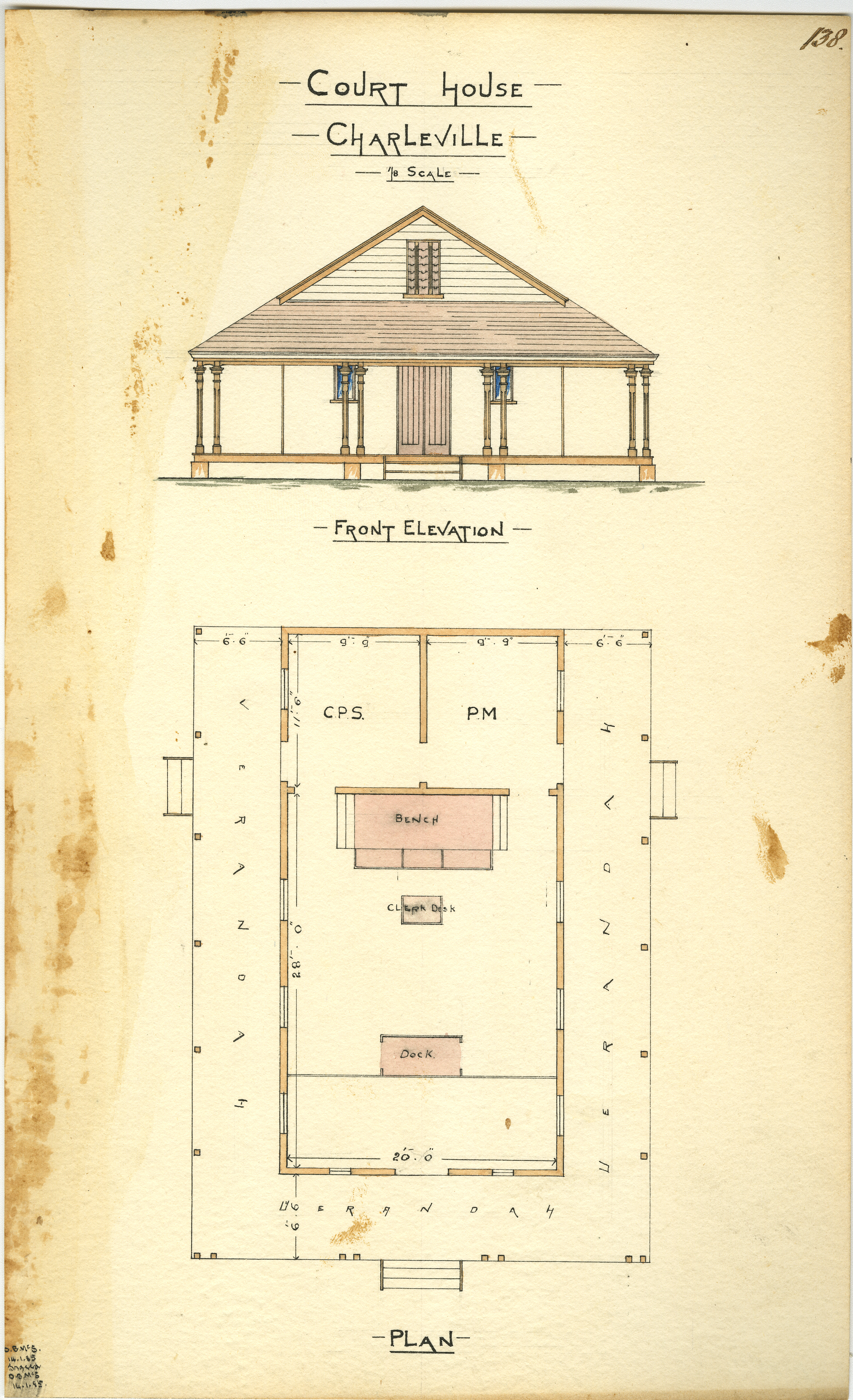
Architectural drawing of the court house, 1885

Bidjara (also known as Bidyara, Pitjara, and Peechara) is an Australian Aboriginal language spoken by the Bidjara people. The Bidjara language region includes the local government areas of the Shire of Murweh, particularly the towns of Charleville, Augathella and Blackall as well as the properties of Nive Downs and Mount Tabor.

Gungabula (also known as Kongabula and Khungabula) is an Australian Aboriginal language of the headwaters of the Dawson River in Central Queensland. The language region includes areas within the local government area of Maranoa Region, particularly the towns of Charleville, Augathella and Blackall and as well as the Carnarvon Range.

The first European exploration of the area, which was Kunja tribal land, was conducted by Edmund Kennedy in 1847.

Gowrie Station had been established around the Gowrie Crossing, a ford across the Warrego River (26.4045°S 146.2273°E) along a natural stock route, for the grazing of sheep and cattle.

The town was gazetted on 11 January 1865. It was situated near Gowrie's Crossing, a permanent waterhole, now on the outskirts of the modern town. It was planned with very wide streets to enable bullock teams of up to 14 pairs to turn with their wagons. It was William Alcock Tully, who was Commissioner of Crown Lands in the Warrego District from 1863 to 1864 and would later serve as Surveyor General of Queensland from 1875 to 1889, who laid out the town's streets. An Irishman, Tully probably named the town after the town of Charleville, County Cork, Ireland.

A hotel was built in 1865. Charleville Post Office opened on 1 August 1865 and a town began to grow to service the region. Members of the Roma-based Skinner family established a store in the town in 1872 that became known as the Warrego Stores and Edward and Margot Kelly ran the Charleville Hotel together from 1928.

In September 1875, the Queensland Government called for tenders to erect a courthouse in Charleville. The foundation stone (actually a bloodwood block) was laid on 23 November 1875. By January 1876, the courthouse was almost finished.

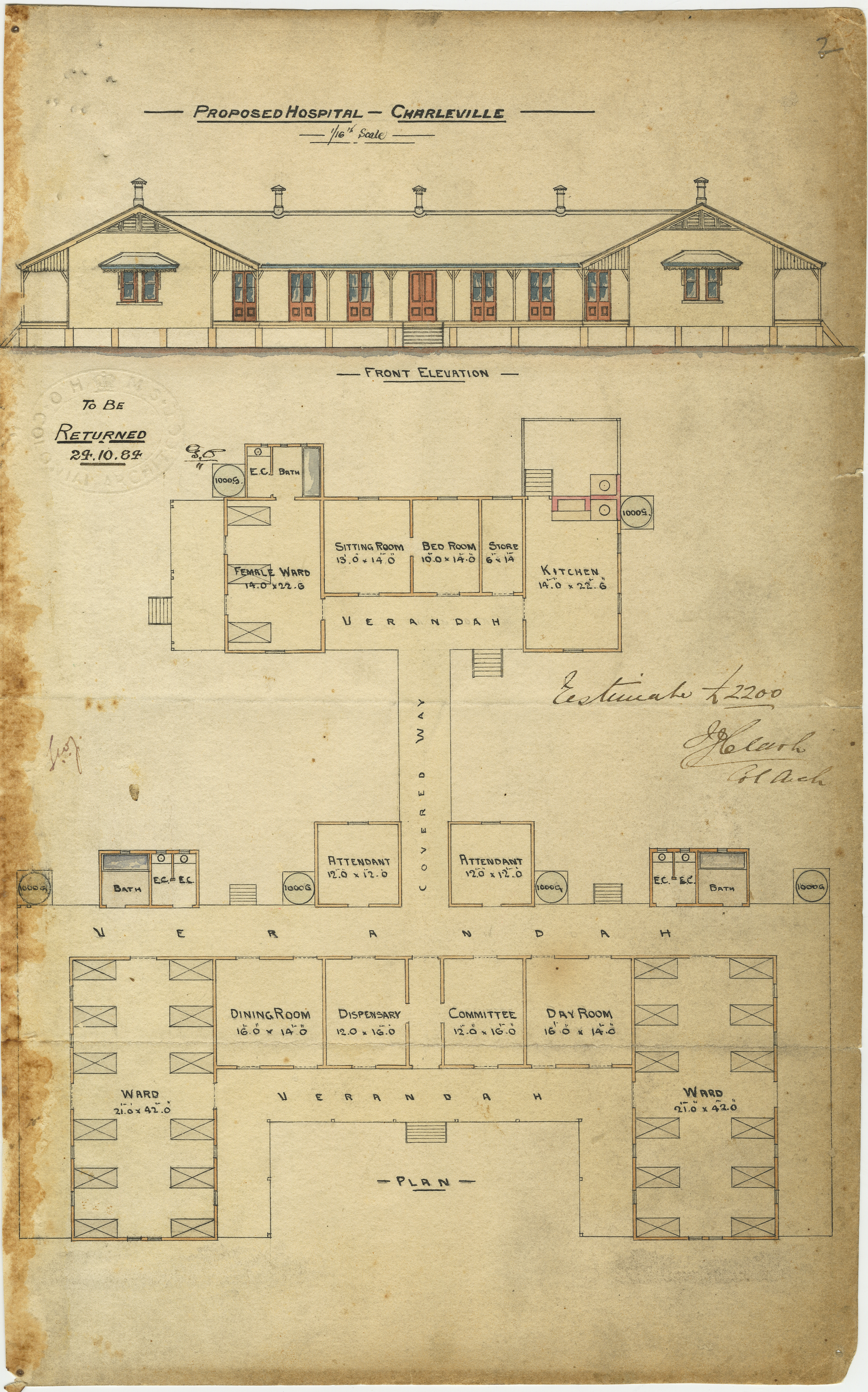
Architectural drawing of the Charleville Hospital, 1884

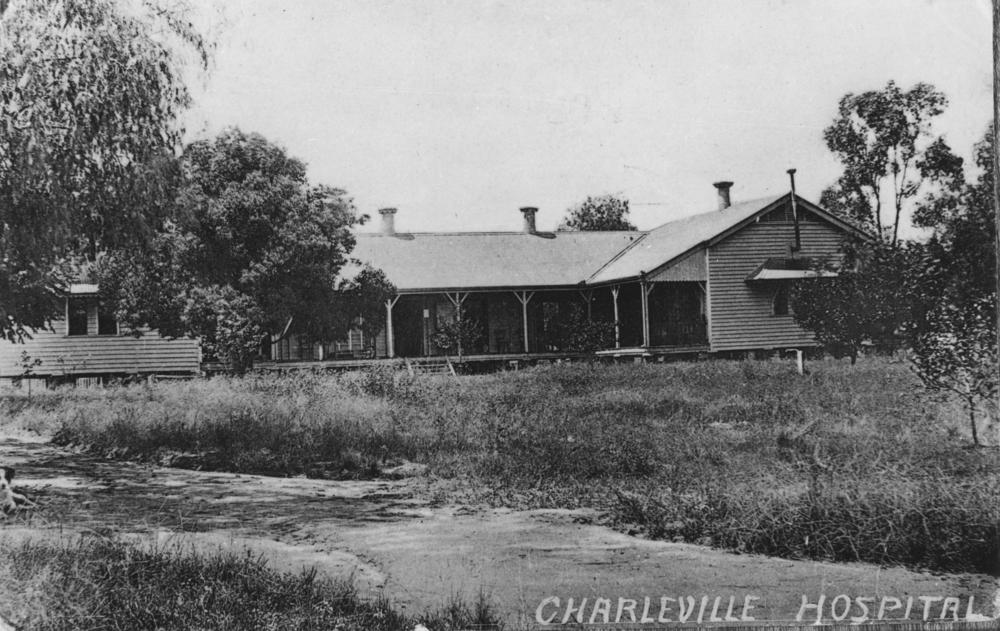
First Charleville Hospital, circa 1911

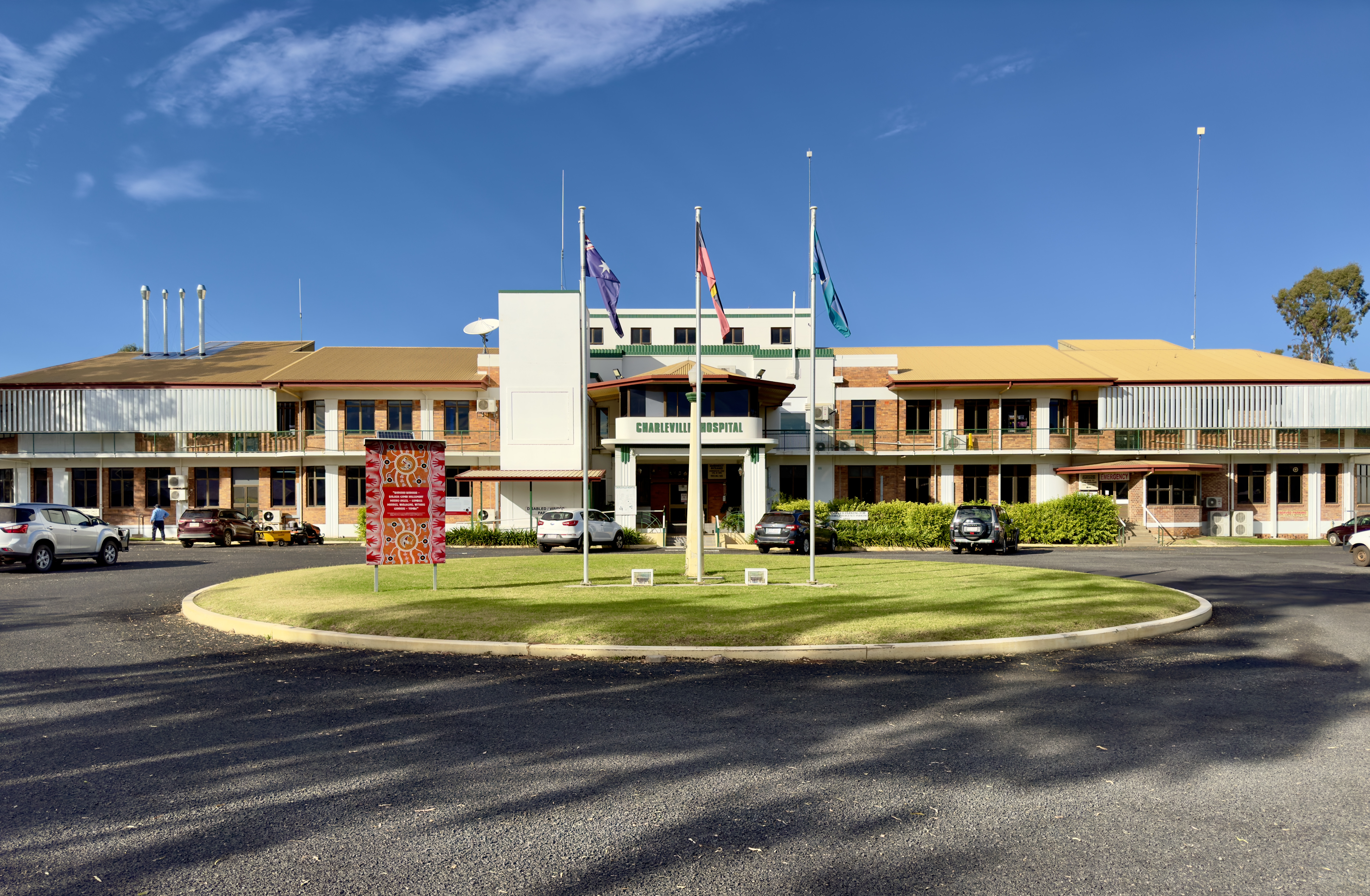
Charleville Hospital, 2024

In December 1884, the Queensland Government called for tenders to erect a hospital in Charleville. In March 1885 the contract was awarded to Richards and King for £2,265 10s. In November 1885, a hospital ball was held in the new hospital building, suggesting it was completed and opened around that time.

Cobb and Co, the legendary Australian stagecoach company, established a coach building business in the town in 1886. however, the railway arrived in 1888, beginning the long demise of coach transport in the area. Charleville railway station opened on 1 March 1888 and was the terminus for the Western railway line until the line was extended south to Cunnamulla in 1898. Facilities included a locomotive depot, cattle and sheep yards, a 50-ton weighbridge, a booking and telegraph offices, goods shed, stationmaster's house, and guards, enginemen and firemen's cottages. Apart from the railway station in Charleville, there were also two now-abandoned railway sidings:

- Dalgety's Siding railway siding (26.4075°S 146.2684°E)
- Glenroy Scour Siding (26.4146°S 146.3125°E)

Charleville railway station is a railway station used by Queensland Rail and a passenger stop for the intercity bus services operated by Greyhound Australia.

In July 1886 the Anglican residents of the town decided to erect a church. All Saint's Anglican Church was opened on by Rev. B. R. Wilson on 20 November 1887. It was designed by diocesan architect John Hingestone Buckeridge and built by Mr. Wood. It was dedicated in 1897. The foundation stone for the present church was laid in September 1957 by Archbishop Reginald Halse. The new church was dedicated in 1958 and consecrated in 1967.

In 1902 Charleville was the location of an unsuccessful attempt by Clement Lindley Wragge to fire cannons into the clouds in order to break a drought. The cannons used remain on display in Charleville today.

St Mary's Catholic Primary School was opened on 26 January 1913 by the Sisters of Mercy with 108 students. By the 1950s, there were over 400 students with a dozen sisters teaching at the school. During the 1960s and 1970s, the school also offered secondary education. The school suffered extensive damage during the April 1990 flood which devastated Charleville.

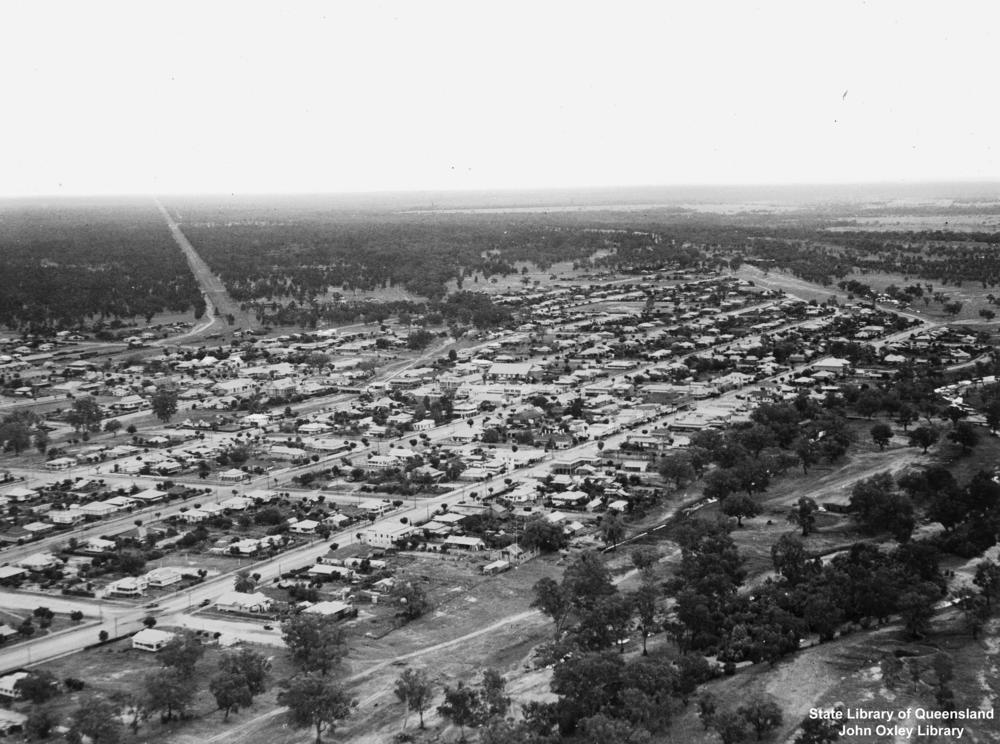
Aerial view of Charleville in 1947

In 1922, Qantas established an airmail service between Charleville and Cloncurry. At the same time, this was Qantas's first regularly scheduled route.

On 9 October 1924, the Charleville War Memorial was unveiled by Sir Matthew Nathan, the Governor of Queensland.

The Anglican Chapel of the Holy Angels Hostels was consecrated circa 1929. It closed circa 1984.

Charleville was also one of the compulsory stopover/check points during the London to Melbourne MacRobertson Air Race in 1934. The winners of the great race were Tom Campbell Black and C. W. A. Scott. Their triumph was reported in Time magazine as:

"Scott and Black, keeping up their sensational pace, flashed into Charleville, refueled, sped toward the finish where waiting thousands cheered their progress, reported over loudspeakers. With one motor dead, with only two hours sleep since leaving England, the Britons triumphantly set their scarlet torpedo down in Melbourne at 3:34 p.m. In 71 hr. 1 min. 3 sec. – Just under three days – they had flown halfway around the world."

In April 1990, major floods hit western Queensland, with Charleville being badly affected. Floodwaters peaked at 8.54 metres, over 1,000 homes were inundated, with 2,800 people evacuated.

The district suffered flooding again in 1997, 2008 and March 2010. Flooding also occurred in February 2012.

A levee was built by the Murweh Shire Council, which was completed in 2009, which protected the town during the 2012 floods (although the floodwater rose close to the top of the levee), but there was still significant flooding in the wider area. In 2013, a diversion and levee system was built to also protect the town from flooding in Bradley’s Gully.

== Demographics ==
In the 2016 census, the locality of Charleville had a population of 3,335 people. Aboriginal and Torres Strait Islander people made up 15.3% of the population. 83.6% of people were born in Australia; the next most common country of birth was Vietnam at 3.3%. 87.6% of people spoke only English at home; other languages spoken at home included Vietnamese at 3.5%. The most common responses for religion were Catholic 34.1%, Anglican 24.1% and No Religion 17.2%.

In the 2021 census, the locality of Charleville had a population of 2,992 people.

== Geography ==
Located in southwestern Queensland, Australia, Charleville is the terminus for the Warrego Highway, which stretches 747 kilometres (464 miles) from Brisbane and is situated:

- 89 kilometres (55 miles) west of Morven
- 135 kilometres (83 miles) west of Mungallala
- 178 kilometres (111 miles) west of Mitchell
- 203 kilometres (126 miles) west of Amby
- 226 kilometres (140 miles) west of Muckadilla
- 254 kilometres (158 miles) west of Roma
- 393 kilometres (244 miles) west of Miles
- 454 kilometres (282 miles) west of Chinchilla
- 535 kilometres (332 miles) west of Dalby
- 591 kilometres (367 miles) west of Oakey
- 616 kilometres (383 miles) west of Toowoomba
- 747 kilometres (464 miles) west of Brisbane

It is the largest town and administrative centre of the Shire of Murweh, which covers an area of 43,905 square kilometres. Charleville is situated on the banks of the Warrego River.

The Mitchell Highway also connects Charleville with:

- Augathella – 84 kilometres (52 miles) north
- Wyandra – 90 kilometres (56 miles) south
- Cunnamulla – 200 kilometres (120 miles) south
- Bourke – 454 kilometres (282 miles) south
- Nyngan – 656 kilometres (408 miles) south
- Dubbo – 825 kilometres (513 miles) south
- Sydney – 1,212 kilometres (753 miles) south-east via Great Western Highway
- Melbourne – 1,433 kilometres (890 miles) south via Mitchell Highway, Kidman Way and Newell Highway

== Heritage listings ==
Charleville has a number of heritage-listed sites, including:

- Former Queensland National Bank, 87 Alfred Street – now a museum known as Historic House
- Charleville War Memorial, Edward Street – focal point for Anzac Day commemorations
- Charleville railway station, King Street – serves as Charleville's main passenger transit hub
- Landsborough's Blazed Tree (Camp 67), Mitchell Highway
- Hotel Corones, 33 Wills Street – home of the longest wooden bar in Southern Queensland

as well as a number in nearby localities:

- Myendetta Homestead, 28 kilometres (17 mi) south-west of Charleville off the Diamantina Developmental Road in Bakers Bend
- Landsborough's Blazed Tree (Camp 69), 29 kilometres (18 mi) south of Charleville off the Mitchell Highway in Bakers Bend
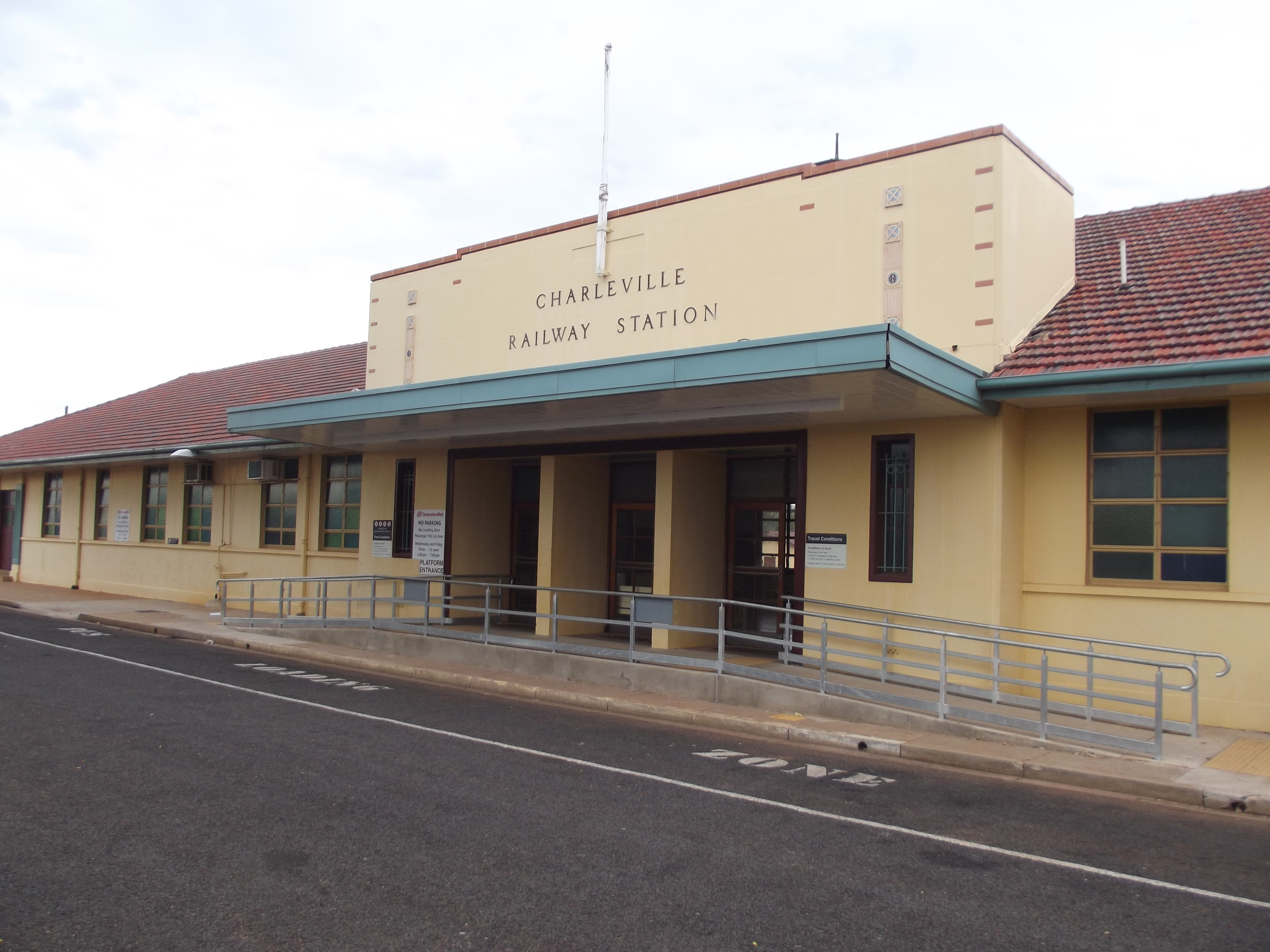
Railway station

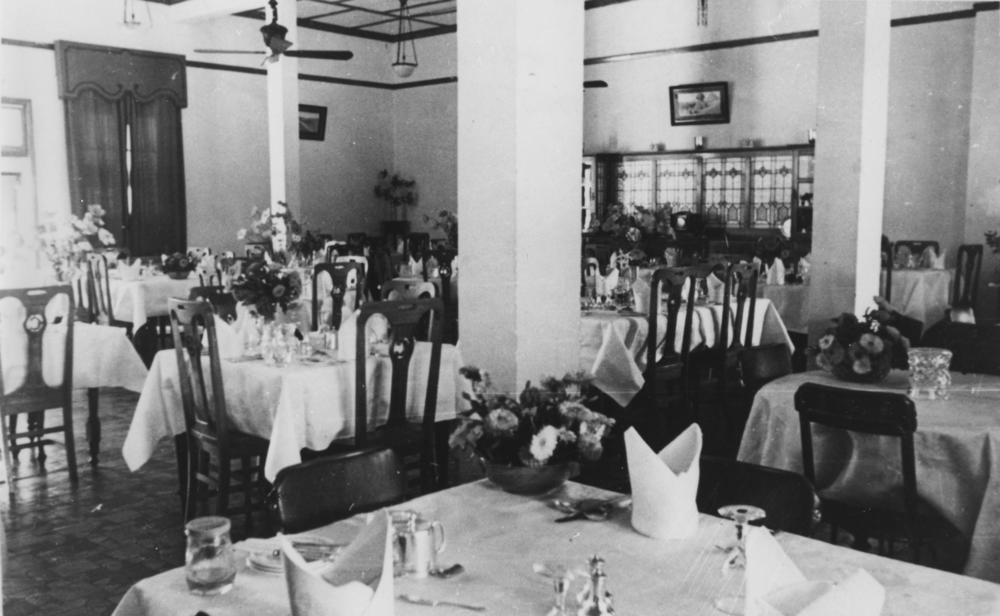
Dining room of the Hotel Corones

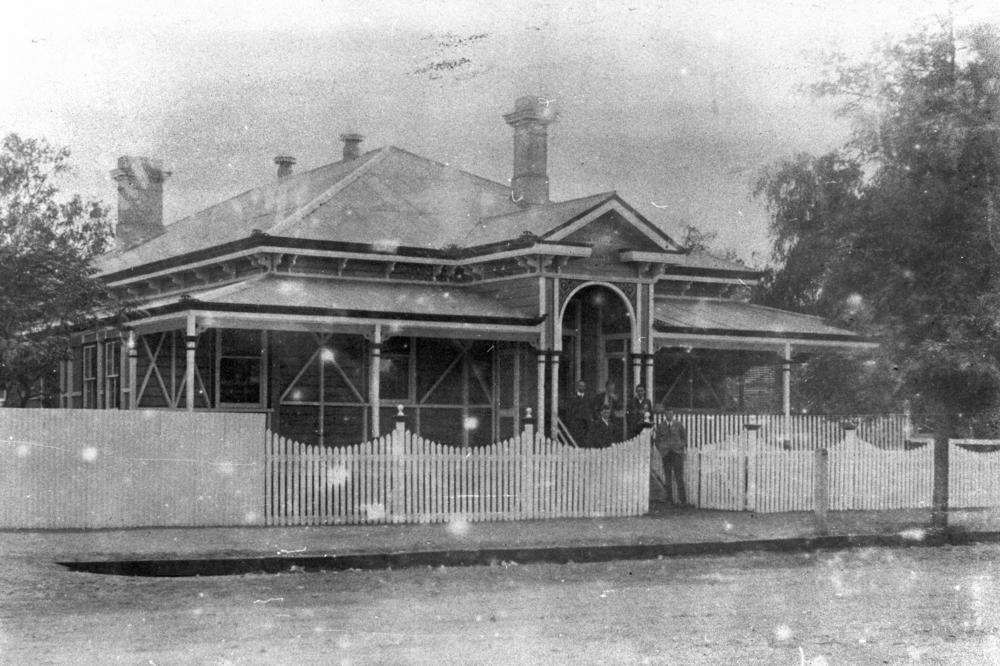
Queensland National Bank

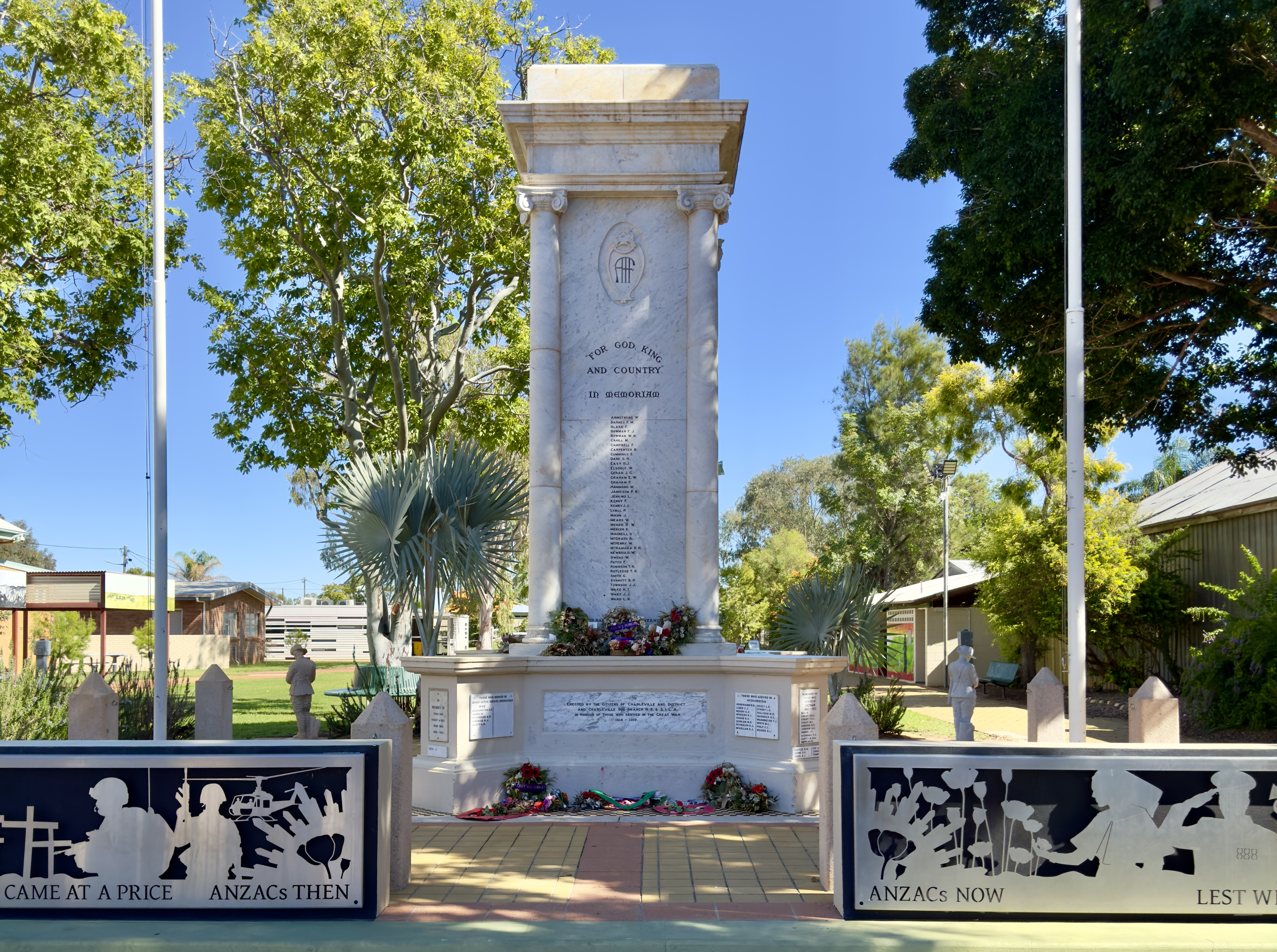
Charleville War Memorial, 2024

== Education ==
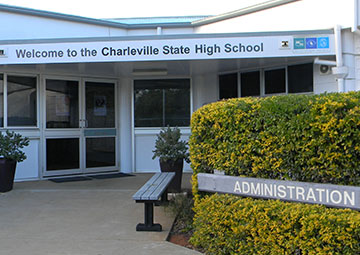
Charleville State High School, 2025

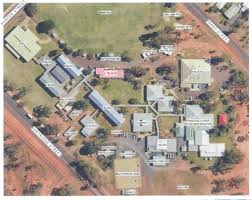
Aerial view of Charleville State High School, 2025

Charleville State School is a government primary (Early Childhood to Year 6) school for boys and girls at 54–56 Wills Street (26.4048°S 146.2423°E). In 2018, the school had an enrolment of 205 students with 20 teachers (19 full-time equivalent) and 22 non-teaching staff (16 full-time equivalent). It includes a special education program.

St Mary's School is a Catholic primary (Preparatory to Year 6) school for boys and girls at 66 Watson Street (26.4036°S 146.2431°E). In 2018, the school had an enrolment of 117 students with 9 teachers (8 full-time equivalent) and 9 non-teaching staff (4 full-time equivalent). It includes a special education program .

Charleville State High School is a government secondary (7–12) school for boys and girls on the corner of Partridge and Hunter Streets (26.3974°S 146.2574°E). It was established in 1961, replacing the Secondary Department at Charleville State School. In 2018, the school had an enrolment of 246 students (including students from Augathella, Morven and Wyandra) with 36 teachers (34 full-time equivalent) and 21 non-teaching staff (16 full-time equivalent). It includes a special education program.

Charleville School of Distance Education is a government primary and secondary (Early Childhood to Year 10) school for boys and girls at Parry Street (26.3950°S 146.2586°E). In 2018, the school had an enrolment of 200 students with 25 teachers (24 full-time equivalent) and 12 non-teaching staff (10 full-time equivalent). It is a School of the Air, providing distance education by a combination of postal services, telephone and Internet to children who are unable to attend a regular school due to their remote location. It includes a special education program.

== Facilities ==
Charleville has a range of facilities for the community including a swimming pool, bowling green, speedway, racing course, and the Gowrie sporting oval.

Charleville public library is at 94 Alfred Street and is operated by the Murweh Shire Council.

The Charleville branch of the Queensland Country Women's Association has its rooms at 145 Alfred Street.

The Charleville Golf Course has eighteen sand greens and a licensed clubhouse in May Street.

The Charleville Bowls Club has two rinks and a licensed clubhouse in Epacris Street.

All Saints Anglican Church is at 41 Alfred Street (26.4026°S 146.2374°E).

Lutheran church services are held at Bluecare Community Centre at 145 Alfred Street (26.3986°S 146.2436°E).

North of the town is VMC, a marine weather transmitter operated by the Bureau of Meteorology.

== Media ==
The local newspaper is the Western Times. Along with many other regional Australian newspapers owned by NewsCorp, the newspaper ceased print editions in June 2020 and became an online-only publication from 26 June 2020.

Local radio stations that broadcast to the town are ABC Western Queensland, West FM and 4VL, a community based station which broadcast on 918 AM.

As part of its regional and rural coverage expansion, the ABC opened a news bureau in Charleville in 2022. It was officially opened on 10 March 2022 by the ABC's managing director David Anderson and then – Federal Minister for Agriculture and Northern Australia and current Federal Member for Maranoa, David Littleproud.

== Attractions ==
Tourist attractions include:

- Charleville Royal Flying Doctor Service of Australia Visitor Centre
- Charleville Historical Museum
- Cosmos Centre, a stargazing centre
- World War II Secret Base, displaying the activities of the 3500 United States Army Air Force personnel stationed in Charleville in 1943
- Charleville Bilby Experience, a wildlife sanctuary which runs a captive breeding program for the greater bilby, a vulnerable species

== Transport ==
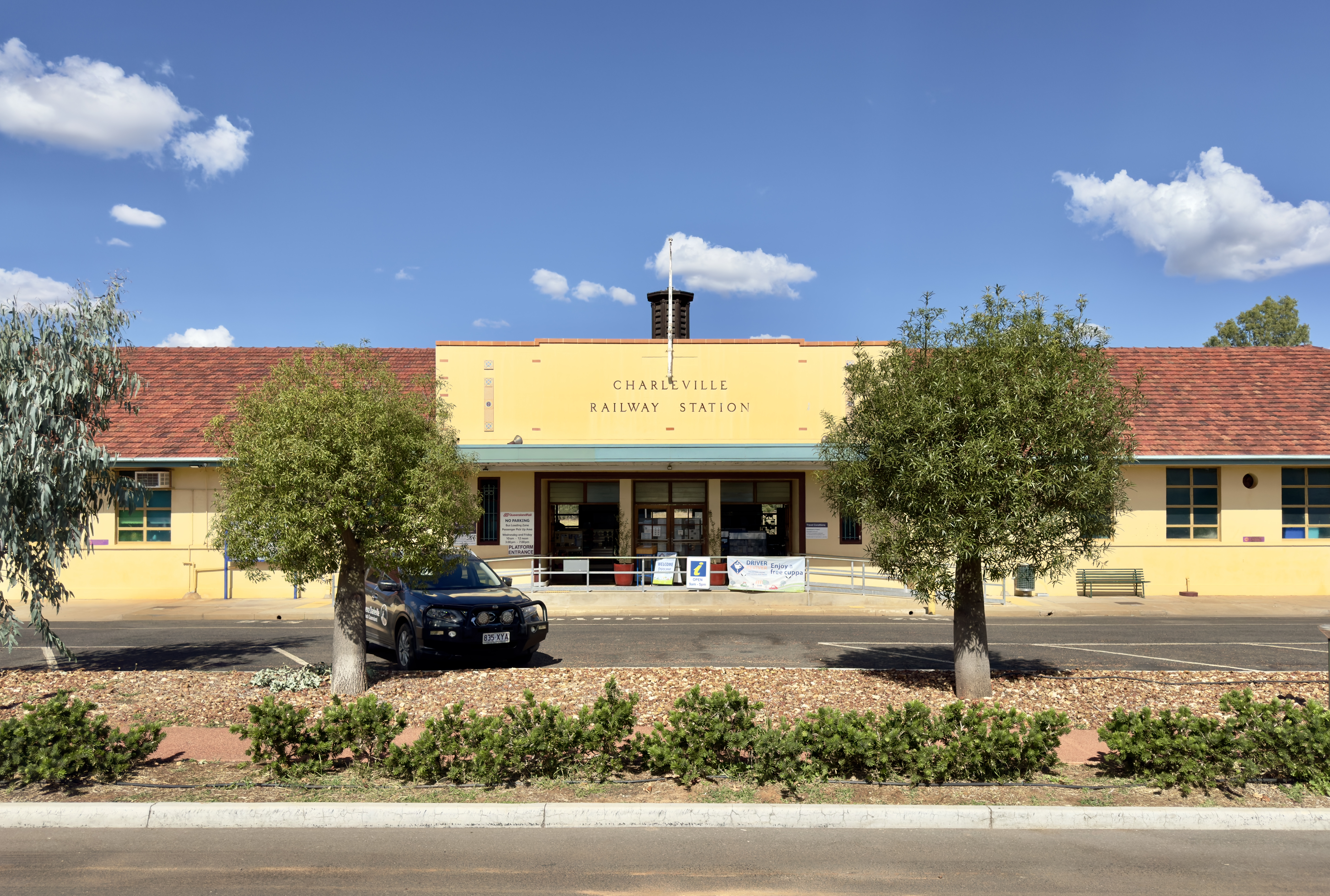
Charleville Railway Station in 2024

Charleville Airport is on Qantas Drive (26.4159°S 146.2621°E) approximately 4 kilometres (2.5 mi) south-west of the town centre. It has two runways, both sealed. One is 1,524 by 30 metres (5,000 ft × 98 ft) and is lit, while the other is 1,067 by 23 metres (3,501 ft × 75 ft) and is unlit.

The Westlander rail passenger service links the Charleville railway station (26.4064°S 146.2441°E) to Brisbane. It first started running in August 1954, replacing the Western Mail. Charleville would have been the southern end of the Transcontinental railway proposed in the 1880s, connecting to Point Parker on the Gulf of Carpentaria.

Prior to 1994, The Westlander was divided at Charleville, the service to Quilpie (3Q02) being nicknamed the Flying Flea and consisted of two passenger carriages, a guards van and power van. The remainder of the train (3V02) headed to Cunnamulla via Westgate and Wyandra. In August 1994, passenger services beyond Charleville were discontinued.

Prior to 10 December 2021, Charleville was serviced by Bus Queensland who operated daily coach services to and from Brisbane via Toowoomba, Dalby, Chinchilla, Miles, Roma, Mitchell and Morven and vice versa. Charleville was also a scheduled stop for Bus Queensland's daily services from Brisbane to Mount Isa and vice versa.

Since 11 December 2021, Charleville has been serviced by Greyhound Australia who operate the following services which it regained from Bus Queensland under a contract from the Queensland Government:

Service	Destination and intermediate stops
Gx493	Brisbane to Mount Isa via Toowoomba, Miles, Roma, Charleville, Augathella, Blackall, Longreach, Winton and Cloncurry
Gx494	Mount Isa to Brisbane via Cloncurry, Winton, Longreach, Blackall, Augathella, Charleville, Roma, Miles and Toowoomba
Gx495	Brisbane to Charleville via Toowoomba, Oakey, Dalby, Chinchilla, Miles, Roma, Mitchell and Morven
Gx496	Charleville to Brisbane via Morven, Mitchell, Roma, Miles, Chinchilla, Dalby, Oakey and Toowoomba

Preceding station	Queensland Rail	Following station
Morven towards Brisbane	The Westlander	Terminus

== Climate ==
Charleville experiences a hot semi-arid climate (Köppen: BSh), with hot summers with variable rainfall and humidity; as well as having mild, dry winters with occasional frost and high diurnal ranges. Average maxima range from 35.2 °C (95.4 °F) in January to 19.7 °C (67.5 °F) in July. Annual precipitation is rather low, averaging 487.3 mm (19.19 in), and peaks in summer due to more abundant showers and thunderstorms. Severe flooding events can occur due to tropical cyclones remnants and monsoon troughs; evident by the 399.7 mm (15.74 in) falling in February 1896: the highest monthly total recorded. Extreme temperatures have ranged from 47.0 °C (116.6 °F) on 27 January 1947 to −5.2 °C (22.6 °F) on 21 July 1951.

Climate data for Charleville (26º24'36"S, 146º15'36"E, 302 m AMSL) (1942–2024 normals, extremes 1889–2024)
Month	Jan	Feb	Mar	Apr	May	Jun	Jul	Aug	Sep	Oct	Nov	Dec	Year
Record high °C (°F)	47.0 (116.6)	45.2 (113.4)	43.9 (111.0)	38.8 (101.8)	33.3 (91.9)	31.0 (87.8)	30.7 (87.3)	35.8 (96.4)	40.7 (105.3)	43.2 (109.8)	45.0 (113.0)	46.0 (114.8)	47.0 (116.6)
Mean daily maximum °C (°F)	35.2 (95.4)	34.0 (93.2)	32.2 (90.0)	28.3 (82.9)	23.4 (74.1)	20.0 (68.0)	19.7 (67.5)	22.1 (71.8)	26.3 (79.3)	30.0 (86.0)	32.9 (91.2)	34.9 (94.8)	28.2 (82.8)
Mean daily minimum °C (°F)	22.0 (71.6)	21.4 (70.5)	18.9 (66.0)	13.9 (57.0)	9.0 (48.2)	5.6 (42.1)	4.4 (39.9)	5.9 (42.6)	10.0 (50.0)	14.6 (58.3)	18.0 (64.4)	20.5 (68.9)	13.7 (56.6)
Record low °C (°F)	10.6 (51.1)	9.4 (48.9)	5.0 (41.0)	0.8 (33.4)	−3.6 (25.5)	−5.0 (23.0)	−5.2 (22.6)	−4.9 (23.2)	−1.7 (28.9)	0.9 (33.6)	4.4 (39.9)	6.7 (44.1)	−5.2 (22.6)
Average precipitation mm (inches)	74.7 (2.94)	66.5 (2.62)	59.8 (2.35)	28.5 (1.12)	29.8 (1.17)	24.6 (0.97)	24.3 (0.96)	19.5 (0.77)	24.4 (0.96)	35.6 (1.40)	44.7 (1.76)	55.5 (2.19)	487.3 (19.19)
Average precipitation days (≥ 1.0 mm)	5.6	5.0	4.1	2.6	2.6	2.6	2.7	2.3	2.5	3.9	4.3	5.4	43.6
Average afternoon relative humidity (%)	30	34	31	32	36	39	35	29	24	23	23	25	30
Average dew point °C (°F)	11.1 (52.0)	12.8 (55.0)	10.1 (50.2)	7.6 (45.7)	5.7 (42.3)	4.1 (39.4)	2.0 (35.6)	0.9 (33.6)	1.2 (34.2)	3.4 (38.1)	5.3 (41.5)	7.7 (45.9)	6.0 (42.8)
Source: Bureau of Meteorology (1942–2024 normals, extremes 1889–2024)

== Notable people ==
- Davida Allen (born 1951), painter, film maker and writer
- Daryl Beattie (born 1970), former professional Grand Prix motorcycle racer and television motor sports commentator
- Richard Bell (born 1953), artist and political activist
- Cameron Boyce (born 1989), first-class cricketer
- Kurt Capewell (born 1993), Premiership winning National Rugby League footballer with the Penrith Panthers and Brisbane Broncos. Now with the New Zealand Warriors
- Luke Capewell (born 1989), former National Rugby League footballer
- Andrew Dutney (born 1958), President of the Assembly of the Uniting Church in Australia
- Peter Everett, television presenter
- Richard Graham (born 1972), Australian Rugby Union coach
- Rhan Hooper (born 1988), former professional Australian rules footballer
- Chelsea Jane (born 1992), rapper and songwriter
- Matthew Mott (born 1973), former first-class cricketer and coach
- Libby Munro (born 1981), actress
- Billy Rogers (born 1989), former National Rugby League footballer
- Neil Turner (1934–2011), politician, State Member for Warrego (1974–1986) and State Member for Nicklin (1989–1998)
- Adrian Vowles (born 1971), former National Rugby League footballer

== In popular culture ==
- An eponymous country music song about Charleville was written by Don Walker and recorded by Slim Dusty on his album Ringer from the Top End and later by Walker's own band Catfish on the album Ruby.
- The asteroid 13933 Charleville is named in the town's honour.
- A children's book called The Flood Grungies was written by Michelle Sheehan and illustrated by Donna Reynolds. It is about the notorious Charleville floods and features the Cosmos centre, the water tower and other famous landmarks.
