= Chesterton Range National Park =

National park in Australia

- IUCN category II (national park)
- Location within Queensland
- Location: Queensland
- Nearest city: Morven
- Coordinates: 26°09′15″S 147°19′27″E
- Area: 309.8 km^{2} (119.6 sq mi)
- Established: 1992
- Governing body: Queensland Parks and Wildlife Service

Chesterton Range is a national park in South West Queensland, Australia, 585 km west of Brisbane. It is located north east of Morven in both the locality of Redford in the Maranoa Region and Tyrconnel in the Shire of Murweh. It lies in the water catchment areas of three waterways. These are the Warrego River, Wallam Creek and the Maranoa River. The park protects part of the Brigalow Belt South bioregion. To the north and the west of the park is Orkadilla State Forest. The average elevation of the terrain is 544 metres.

The park features a small two-room homestead. The pastoral holding was abandoned in 1937. 13 rare or threatened species have been identified in the national park. This includes a colony of the vulnerable yakka skink, then woma python, red goshawk, grey falcon, koala and others.

== See also ==
- Protected areas of Queensland
