= Toowoomba North State School =

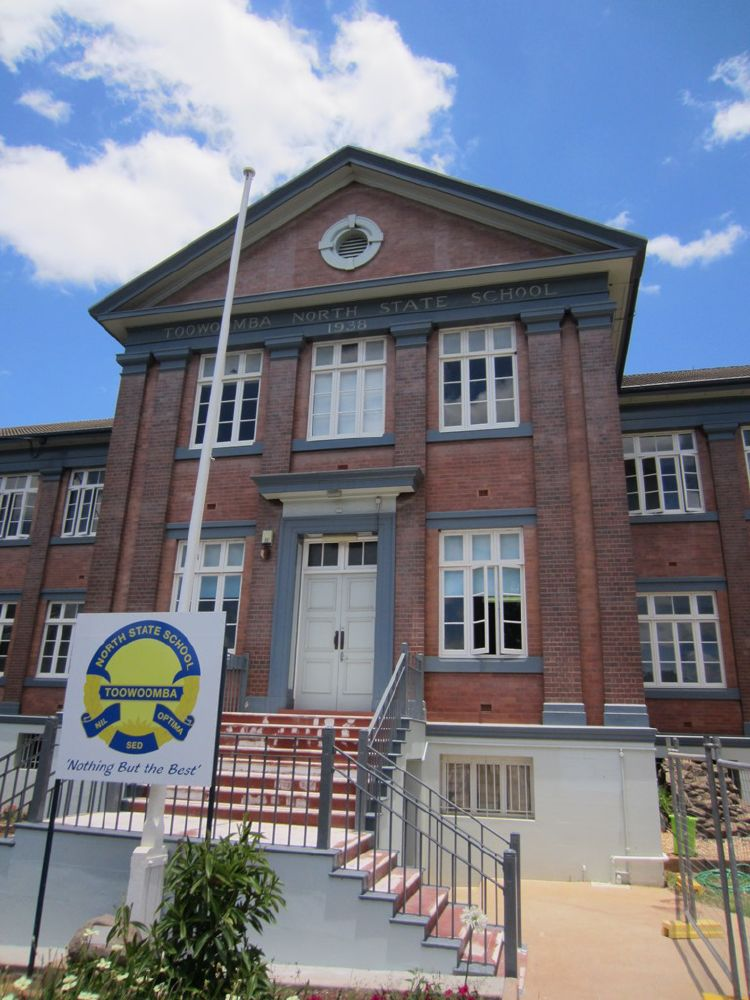
- Main entrance, Taylor Street

- Location within Queensland
- 27.5569°S 151.9485°E
- Location: 139 Mort Street, Toowoomba City, Toowoomba, Toowoomba Region, Queensland, Australia

History
- Design period: 1939–1945 (World War II)
- Built: 1938–1949, 1951–1957

Site notes
- Architectural style: Classicism

Queensland Heritage Register
- Official name: Toowoomba North State School
- Type: state heritage
- Designated: 6 May 2016
- Reference no.: 650024
- Type: Education, research, scientific facility: School-state
- Theme: Educating Queenslanders: Providing primary schooling

Toowoomba North State School is a heritage-listed state school at 139 Mort Street, Toowoomba City, Toowoomba, Toowoomba Region, Queensland, Australia. It was built from 1938 to 1957. It was formerly known as Mort Estate National School. It was added to the Queensland Heritage Register on 6 May 2016.

== History ==
Toowoomba North State School (opened in September 1869 as the Mort Estate National School) is located to the northwest of Toowoomba's CBD. It is important in demonstrating the evolution of state education and its associated architecture. It retains a Depression-era brick school building (1938, 1950), constructed as a Depression-era work project; a 1950s timber school building with extensions (1951–57, including a vocational training building addition); set in landscaped grounds with assembly and play areas, sporting facilities and mature trees. The school has a strong and ongoing association with the Toowoomba community.

European settlement of the Toowoomba area commenced in 1840 when squatters occupied pastoral runs on the Darling Downs. Near the boundaries of Westbrook, Gowrie and Eton Vale runs and at the junction of two routes to Gorman's and Hodgson's gaps through the Main Range, the small settlement of Drayton (originally known as 'The Springs') evolved from 1842 as a stopping place for pastoralists and travellers. Six kilometres to its northeast, was an area known as "The Swamp", later named Toowoomba, which was first surveyed in 1849 as 12 suburban allotments of Drayton. Further survey and auction took place in 1853 for 1–2 acre allotments. Toowoomba grew rapidly due to its better land and water supply, support from squatters and land speculators, and, from 1855, an easier route to Brisbane via The Toll Road. It was declared a municipality (the Borough of Toowoomba) in July 1860 and continued to develop rapidly during the 1860s with strong promotion of the town by local residents, and successful lobbying for government funding for civic improvements by political representatives.

The provision of state-administered education was important to the colonial governments of Australia. National schools, established in 1848 in New South Wales, were continued in Queensland following the colony's separation in 1859. Following the introduction of the Education Act 1860, which established the Board of General Education and began standardising curriculum, training and facilities, Queensland's national and public schools grew from four in 1860 to 230 by 1875. The State Education Act 1875 provided for free, compulsory and secular primary education and established the Department of Public Instruction. This further standardised the provision of education, and despite difficulties, achieved the remarkable feat of bringing basic literacy to most Queensland children by 1900.

The establishment of schools was considered an essential step in the development of early communities and integral to their success. Locals often donated land and labour for a school's construction and the school community contributed to maintenance and development. Schools became a community focus, a symbol of progress, and a source of pride, with enduring connections formed with past pupils, parents and teachers.

To help ensure consistency and economy, the Queensland Government developed standard plans for its school buildings. From the 1860s until the 1960s, Queensland school buildings were predominantly timber-framed, an easy and cost-effective approach that also enabled the government to provide facilities in remote areas. Standard designs were continually refined in response to changing needs and educational philosophy and Queensland school buildings were particularly innovative in climate control, lighting, and ventilation. Standardisation produced distinctly similar schools across Queensland with complexes of typical components.

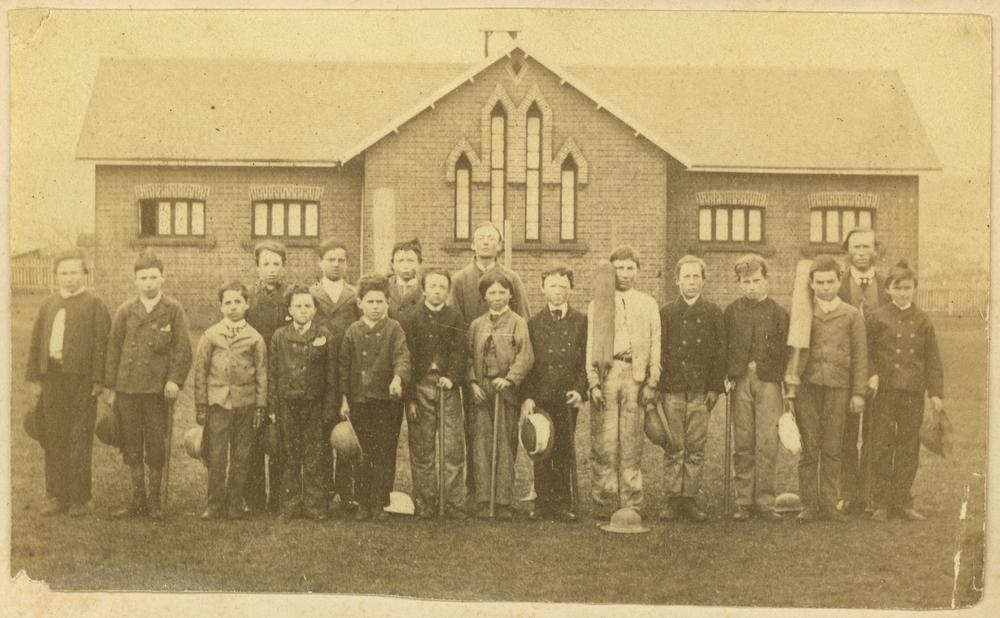
North Toowoomba Boys School

Toowoomba North State School opened as the Mort Estate National School on 6 September 1869 on land donated by pastoralist and politician, James Taylor, MLA. The population of Toowoomba at the time was 3000. The school was opened as a Boys School, with an enrolment of 141 boys, and a Girls and Infants School, with a commencing enrolment of 113 pupils. Both were housed in a brick building facing Mort Street. Within a year, the school's enrolments had doubled to 286 enrolled at the Boys School with an average attendance of 140, and 261 enrolled at the Girls and Infants School with an average attendance of 130.

Later the Girls and Infants School was housed in a separate masonry building facing Taylor Street on one acre, donated by James Taylor in 1874, and located behind the Boys School, which faced Mort Street.

Toowoomba continued to grow throughout the remainder of the 19th and the early 20th century. By the 1870s Toowoomba had consolidated its status as the main urban centre of the Darling Downs. The arrival of the Main Line railway in 1867 secured the town's development and subsequently made it the hub for the Southern and Western railways. The economy diversified to include numerous small-scale manufacturing outlets, while the majority of administrative, service and other government and education functions for the surrounding region were centred on the town. Toowoomba's progress was reflected in improvements to the physical environment. Important capital works were commenced or completed, including the draining of its swamps, improved water supply, gasworks for lighting, extensive tree plantings and the initial development of Queen's Park. Earlier temporary structures were increasingly replaced with more permanent and impressive buildings.

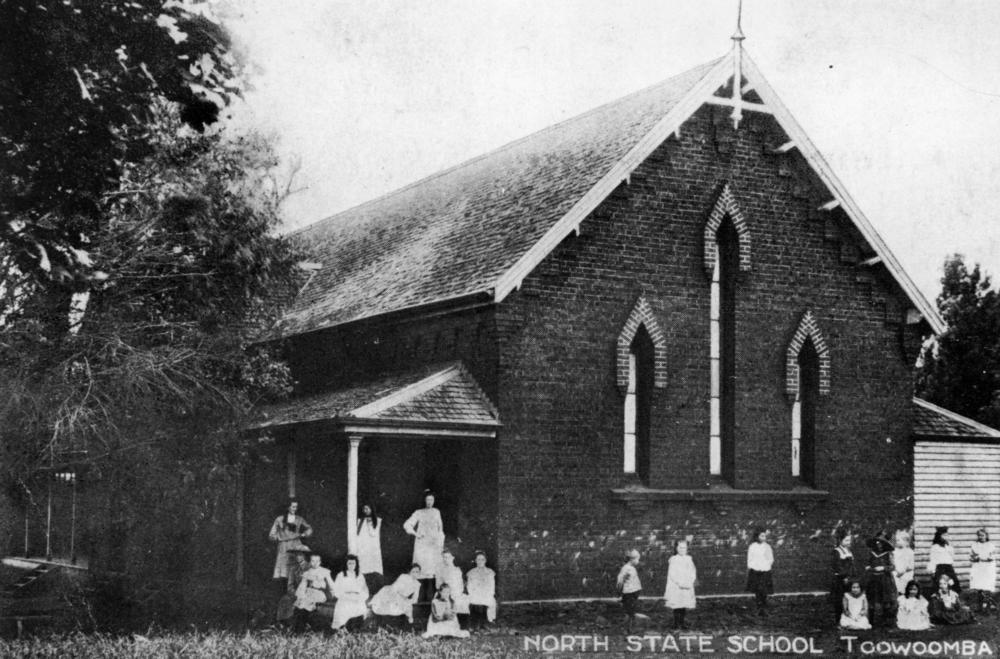
Toowoomba North State School, circa 1907

In the first two decades of the 20th century, the school committee made representation to the Department of Public Instruction, through its Minister and local members of parliament, for a new school on the basis that the buildings and grounds were inadequate.

In c. 1922 Toowoomba North (Boys, and Girls and Infants Schools) was granted its request for purchase of land for school grounds to supplement its small site. "The Farm", 6373 sqm of land diagonally opposite the school on the corner of Mort and Taylor Streets, which was already rented for sporting activities, was bought. One acre of the Cory Estate to the school's west was purchased, onto which the headmaster's residence was moved, allowing the whole of the existing Taylor Street land to be used for school buildings and grounds. However, the opening of the Newtown State School in October 1924 reduced enrolments at Toowoomba North, making a new school unnecessary.

By the early 1930s the school buildings were in a state of disrepair.

The Great Depression, commencing in 1929 and extending well into the 1930s, had caused a dramatic reduction of building work in Queensland and brought private building work to a standstill. In response, the Queensland Government provided relief work for unemployed Queenslanders, and also embarked on an ambitious and important building programme to provide impetus to the economy.

In June 1932 the Forgan Smith Labor Government came to power from a campaign that advocated increased government spending to counter the effects of the Depression. The government embarked on a large public works building programme designed to promote the employment of local skilled workers, the purchase of local building materials and the production of commodious, low maintenance buildings which would be a long-term asset to the state. This building programme included: government offices, schools and colleges; university buildings; court houses and police stations; hospitals and asylums; and gaols.

Many of the programmes have had lasting beneficial effects for the citizens of Queensland, including the construction of masonry brick school building s across the state. Most were designed in a classical idiom to project a sense of stability and optimism which the government sought to convey through the architecture of its public buildings.

The construction of substantial brick school buildings in prosperous or growing suburban areas and regional centres during the 1930s provided tangible proof of the government's commitment to remedy the unemployment situation. The Queensland Public Works Department (DPW) and Department of Public Instruction (DPI) were extremely enthusiastic about the brick school building s designed in the 1930s. They were considered monuments to progress embodying the most modern principles of the ideal education environment.

A preliminary estimate of the cost of a new brick school building for Toowoomba North was made in January 1936, however, funding was not available in that financial year. In August 1936 a report on the material requirements for North Toowoomba Girls and Infants School recommended that construction of a new building be expedited.

Finally, in February 1937, the Minister for Public Instruction decided that the Toowoomba North Schools' site should be used for the erection of one combined primary school to accommodate approximately 500 children - boys, girls and infants. The building was to be erected at the Mort Street end of the Taylor Street frontage and would use north and south lighting. Accommodation for instruction in Manual Training (woodwork only) and domestic science was to be provided and the building's siting was designed to provide as much ground for playing or sports purposes as possible. The work was to be carried out by the DPW using day labour.

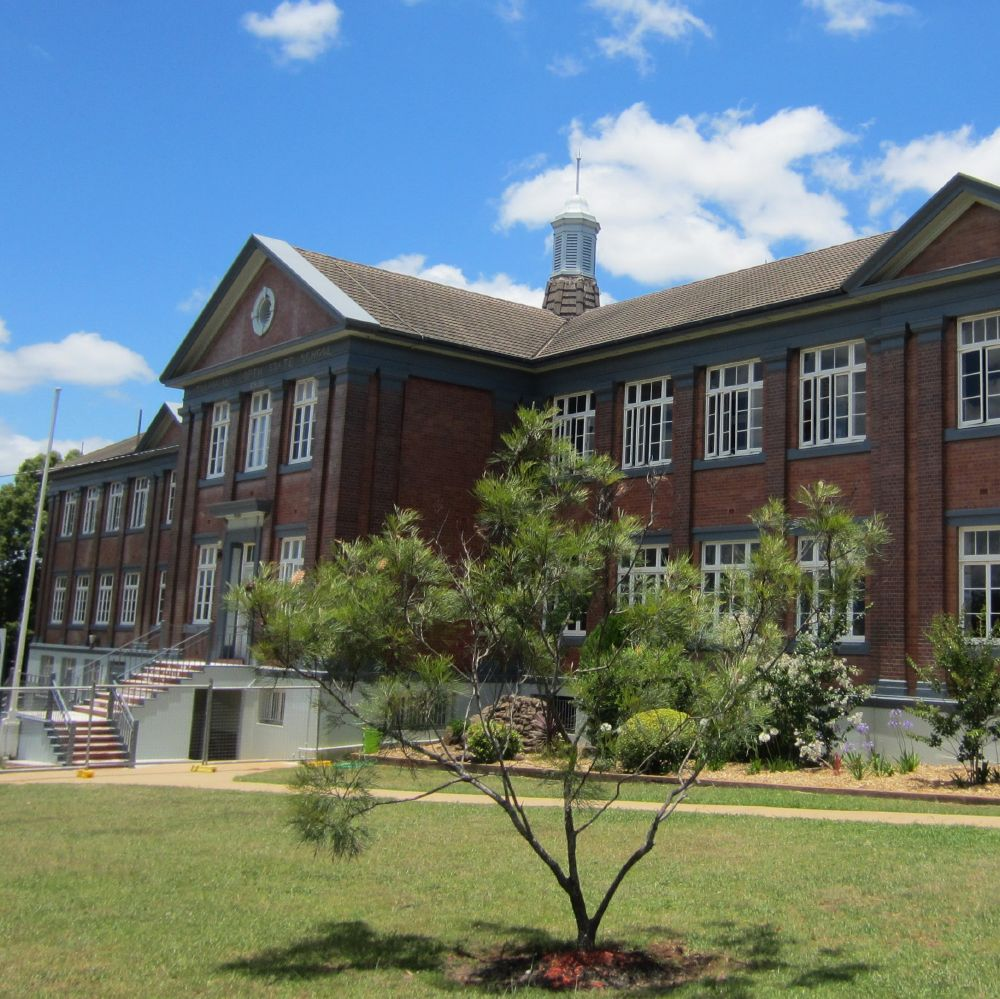
Depression-era Brick School Building, North elevation

Depression-era brick school building s form a recognisable and important type, exhibiting many common characteristics. Frequently, these buildings were two storeys above an open undercroft and built to accommodate up to 1000 students. They adopted a symmetrical plan form and often exhibited a prominent central entry. The plan arrangement was similar to that of timber buildings, being only one classroom deep, accessed by a long straight verandah or corridor. This linear design could be built in stages if necessary; resulting in some complete designs never being realised. Ideally, the classrooms would face south with the verandah on the north but little concession was made for this and almost all Depression-era brick school building s faced the primary boundary road, regardless of orientation. Classrooms were commonly divided by folding timber partitions and the undercroft was used as covered play space, storage, ablutions and other functions.

Despite their similarities, each Depression-era brick school building was individually designed by a DPW architect, which resulted in a wide range of styles and ornamental features being used within the overall set. These styles, which were derived from contemporary tastes and fashions, included: Arts and Crafts, typified by half-timbered gable-ends; Spanish Mission, with round-arched openings and decorative parapets; and Neo-classical, with pilasters, columns and large triangular pediments. Over time, variations occurred in building size, decorative treatment, and climatic-responsive features. Where other functions, such as infants classes or vocational training, were required, standard rooms designed to accommodate these functions were incorporated into the building plan. The Chief Architect during this period was Andrew Baxter Leven (1885–1966), who was employed by the DPW from 1910 to 1951, and was Chief Architect and Quantity Surveyor from 1933 to 1951.

Toowoomba North State School's brick school building had an authorised cost of £22,090. Erected on the site of the existing Boys School building, the new building, with concrete staircases and asbestos-cement slate roof, was to contain 10 classrooms, providing accommodation for 400 pupils. The undercroft contained a large play area, plus lavatories and a classroom for woodwork. The first floor comprised five classrooms, plus teachers rooms, domestic science rooms, lavatories and storeroom, while the second floor had five classrooms and two teachers rooms. Three classrooms on each floor could be converted into large assembly rooms by means of folding partitions. The building was of brick construction. The foreman of works was F Bentley.

At some point prior to the completion of the building it was decided to construct two extra classrooms at the eastern end of the second floor, above the domestic science rooms. This addition was constructed to match the rest of the building, and brought the total number of classrooms to 12.

Toowoomba North's brick school building was officially opened by the Minister for Public Instruction (Harry Bruce) on 5 November 1938 with the unveiling of the bronze tablet at the main entrance to the school.

The school's 1938 souvenir magazine described the 231-by-34-foot (70 m × 10 m) building:

"An important feature of the building is that all the...corridors are enclosed with casements.... Provision has...been made in the design for...future extensions that may be required. The whole of the inside of the building, both corridors and classrooms, is painted, the predominant colours being dark red to dado line with light green above. This colour scheme has been varied in some rooms by contrasting tones of brown and cream. Ceilings of rooms are...fibro-cement painted white with contrasting cover-strips of brown. All plaster work is of light stone colour wash below plinth level, whilst the plaster has been lined out to imitate stone work."

In the domestic science room, on the eastern end of the ground floor, the kitchen was tiled to the height of 6 feet (1.8 m) and had a terrazzo floor. The remaining floor was covered by linoleum. The woodwork room was located at the eastern end of the undercroft. The building had a roof fleche for ventilation.

All of the materials used were supplied from within southeast Queensland. Bricks for the building were supplied by John Brazier of Kleinton, while the timber was supplied by Filshie, Broadfoot.

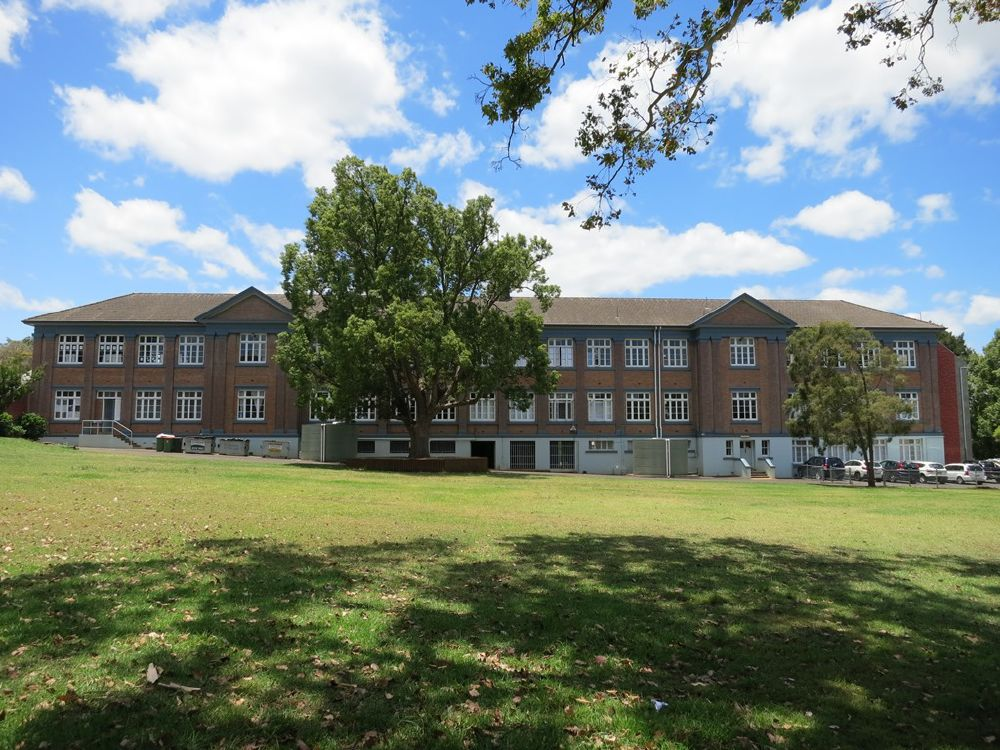
Play areas with Block A to the rear

An important component of Queensland state schools was their grounds. The early and continuing commitment to play-based education, particularly in primary school, resulted in the provision of outdoor play space and sporting facilities, such as ovals and tennis courts. Also, trees and gardens were planted to shade and beautify schools. In the 1870s, schools inspector William Boyd was critical of tropical schools and amongst his recommendations stressed the importance of the adding shade trees to playgrounds. Subsequently, Arbor Day celebrations began in Queensland in 1890. Aesthetically designed gardens were encouraged by regional inspectors, and educators believed gardening and Arbor Days instilled in young minds the value of hard work and activity, improved classroom discipline, developed aesthetic tastes, and inspired people to stay on the land.

After completion of Toowoomba North's brick school building, the formation of the school grounds and sports fields was a major task. Initially the school had to wait for demolition of remaining earlier buildings. Then, in 1939 and 1940 the school committee repeatedly prompted the Department of Public Instruction for assistance with levelling of the site and creation of gardens and playing areas such as a vigoro pitch and basketball courts.

The Department of Public Instruction was largely unprepared for the enormous demand for state education that began in the late 1940s and continued well into the 1960s. This was a nationwide occurrence resulting from the unprecedented population growth now termed the "baby boom". Queensland schools were overcrowded and, to cope, many new buildings were constructed and existing buildings were extended.

After World War II the overriding concern for the Department of Public Instruction was the need to erect school buildings as expeditiously and economically as possible. Queensland schools were faced with enormous overcrowding and a lack of resources. However, the Queensland Government and community saw education as a low priority and provided the department with only a small budget. Also, educationalists rejected the previous designs of school buildings, considering them outdated, and favoured "lighter, loosely grouped, flexible" buildings.

In the immediate Post-World War II years, additions to Toowoomba North State School's brick school building were made. In May 1944, the school committee requested enclosure of an area under the school for a combined First Aid, Rest and Reading Room. This was granted in September of that year and the work took place thereafter. In December 1949 the Works Minister (Bill Power) announced additions for Toowoomba North State School and two new classrooms were added at the western end of the second floor to accommodate growth in pupil numbers.

Enrolments at Toowoomba North State School grew to such an extent that in September 1951 approval was given for a three-classroom building to be erected to the west of the existing school building. From 1950 the Department of Public Instruction introduced and developed new standard plans for school buildings. These buildings were generally high-set timber-framed structures and the understorey was used as covered play space. Introduced in 1950, the principal type was a long and narrow building with a gable roof. Stairs were often semi-enclosed, connecting the understorey to a north facing verandah running the length of the building. Classrooms opened off the verandah and had extensive areas of windows; almost the entirety of the verandah wall and the opposite classroom wall were glazed, allowing abundant natural light and ventilation. This type was the most commonly constructed in the 1950s in Queensland.

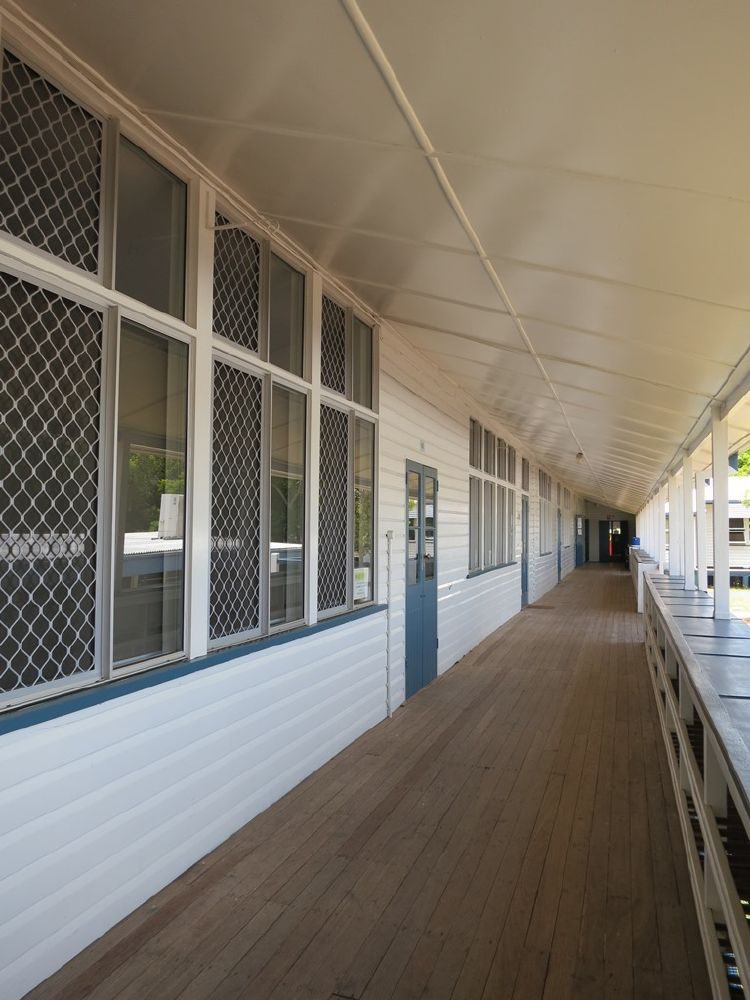
1950s Timber School Building verandah, looking West

The new building at Toowoomba North State School was orientated east–west and located 100 feet (30 m) from the Depression-era brick building. It was accessed by a single set of stairs, positioned perpendicular to the centre of the north verandah. It had hatroom enclosures at either end of the verandah and, due to the slope of the land, part of the understorey was too low to be used for play space. The building was completed in late 1951 or early 1952.

The building was soon extended. In September 1953, plans for a single classroom addition to the east of the 3-classroom building were drawn and the work subsequently performed. This addition matched the existing building and included a second staircase to the verandah. In October 1955, plans were drawn for two more classrooms to be added to the east of the previous addition. These were built sometime in 1956 and were slightly different to the earlier classrooms. Windows in the southern walls were awning windows instead of casements; external cladding extended to ground level on the south and east sides, forming a semi-enclosed play space beneath; bag racks were built instead of verandah balustrades; and instead of a hat room, the east end of the verandah was enclosed with a glazed screen.

In October 1956 plans for an addition of timber vocational training rooms to the west end of the building were drawn. In 1954 the Department of Public Works had introduced a new standard design for a timber-framed vocational training building. Highset with a verandah along one side, this design comprised a large 21-by-32-foot (6.4 by 9.8 m) room accommodating either manual training or domestic science classes, with smaller rooms opening off it for complementary purposes (e.g., a laundry room, fitting room, storage etc.). The example constructed at Toowoomba North State School comprised a long, lowset building oriented north–south, with a western verandah and a central passageway linking to the north verandah of the classroom wing. It housed a large woodwork and sheet-metal work room, a saw room and teachers room to the north, and a large cookery and dressmaking room to the south, with a laundry, store room and dining room occupying part of the verandah. Completed in 1957, this addition allowed the domestic science and woodwork rooms in the Depression-era brick school building to be converted into four classrooms.

The 1950s timber school building ceased to be used for vocational classes from 1964 when Grade 8 transferred from primary to secondary school. The domestic science room was subsequently converted into a general purpose room. In the 1970s, the large manual training room was divided in two and used as a classroom and library, and the former saw room on the verandah became a janitor's store room. The large domestic science room was divided into a music room and stock room, and a small health room was created adjacent to the classroom wing. At some point the western verandah was enclosed with timber awning windows.

Additions and modifications to the school grounds have been made periodically since the initial make-over of the grounds after the construction of the brick school building . The playground around the brick school building and in front of the timber building was bitumen-sealed in stages, commencing in 1947. Around the same time, concrete garden edging was laid and shrubs along Taylor and Mort Streets planted. On 10 October 1959 the school's swimming pool opened at the western end of the school grounds.

Toowoomba North State School reached its peak enrolment of 1111 in 1963; the largest enrolment of any school in Toowoomba at the time. However, after Queensland's Grade 8 transferred to high school in 1964, enrolment fell to a little over 900 pupils.

Further changes to the school grounds ensued. In 1966 the government purchased "Finchley", a double-storied home with a little over one acre of grounds, which was located on the southern side of the school. The building was demolished and the grounds cleared and levelled for use as a playground. The teachers residence remained on site at the Kingston Street (west) end of the school grounds until 1962 when it was sold. Removal and pruning of established trees along Mort and Taylor Streets and to the south of the brick school building occurred in the mid-1970s. A pre-school centre was added on a site opposite the school in Taylor Street in 1976.

Alterations to the interior of the Depression-era brick school building since the 1960s include the removal of early folding partitions to classrooms, the conversion of the cloakrooms to offices and staff rooms, the replacement of some doors and windows, and the relining of the first floor corridor ceiling. Suspended ceilings, partitions, wet areas and kitchenettes have also been installed in some rooms. Detached fire stairs were constructed at the east and west ends of the building in 2008.

The 1950s building is still used for classrooms and staff purposes, and no longer serves as a vocational training building. Alterations to the vocational section of the building include the insertion of additional partitions and doors and the enclosure of the western verandah. The classroom wing remains largely intact, with internal changes including replacement of some wall and ceiling linings The verandah staircases have been replaced and an additional staircase constructed at the east end of the verandah.

Toowoomba North State School marked the centenary of its establishment with publication of a school history in 1969 and a day of celebrations including a luncheon for early teachers and pupils, a thanksgiving service, the unveiling of a cairn, the official opening of the A E Horne Centenary Library, a march of centenary year pupils and a display of the old and the new in the school buildings.

In 2016, the school continues to operate from its original site. It retains the Department of Public Works Depression-era brick school building and the 1950s timber school building with extensions, set in landscaped grounds with a swimming pool, playing areas and mature shade trees. Toowoomba North State School is important to Toowoomba, as a key social focus for the community, with many social events having been held in the school's grounds and buildings; and as generations of students have been taught there since its establishment.

Toowoomba North State School is important to Toowoomba, as a key social focus for the community with many social events having been held in the school's grounds and buildings; and as generations of students have been taught there since its establishment.

== Description ==
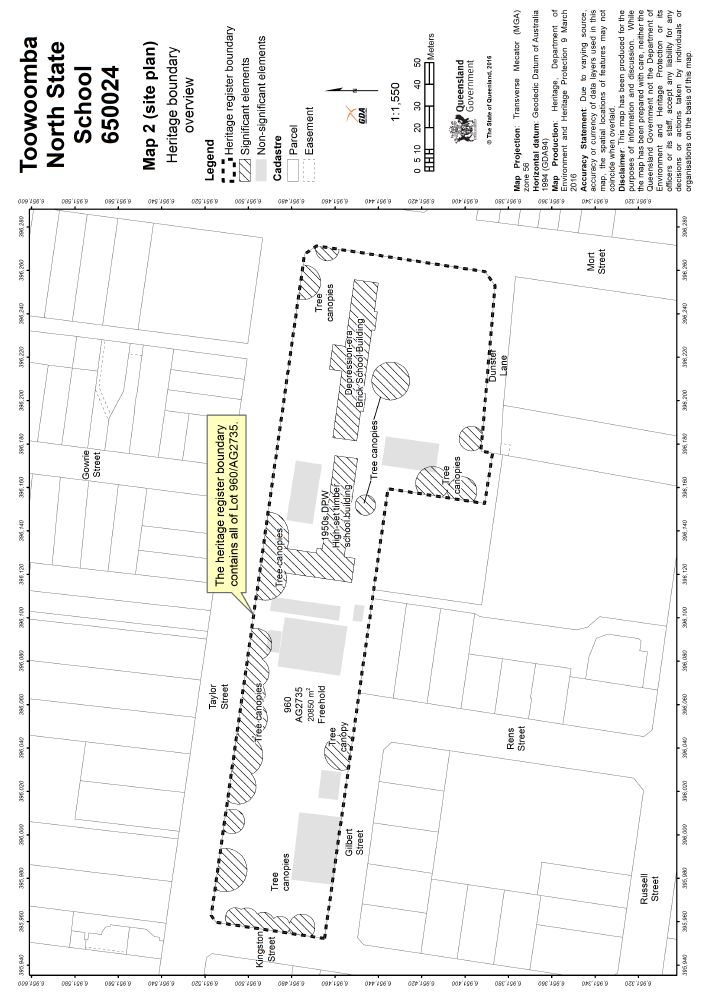
Site map

Toowoomba North State School is located in the Darling Downs city of Toowoomba, northwest of the central business district. It occupies a long, two hectare site along the northern side of a block bounded by Mort Street to the east, Taylor Street to the north, and Kingston Street to the west. To the south, the school is bounded by Gilbert Street, Dunster Lane and private properties. School buildings are located in the northeast portion of the site, with playing fields to the south and west, and numerous mature trees lining the school perimeter. A 1938 Depression-era brick school building (Block A) is the largest building and stands at the eastern end of the site. To the west is a 1950s timber school building (Block B) which comprises a classroom wing and a former vocational training building.

=== Block A – 1938 brick school building ===
Block A is a substantial, classically detailed, two-storey masonry structure, with an undercroft. The building is symmetrically arranged and orientated east–west, addressing Taylor Street to the north. The main entrance is demarcated by a central projecting bay, accessed by a T-shaped staircase. The building has a hipped roof clad with concrete tiles and has a prominent ventilation flèche in the centre. Recently constructed external stairwells attached to the east and west ends of the building are not of heritage significance.

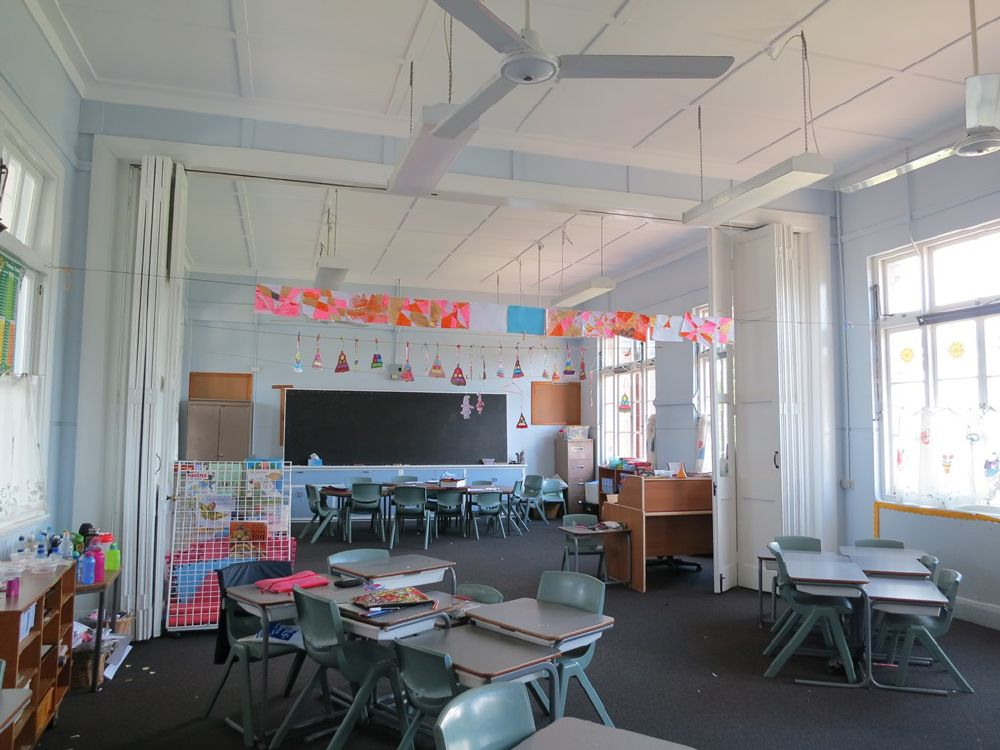
Brick School Building classrooms connected by original folding doors

The building is elegantly composed, with load-bearing face brick walls and rendered decorative elements to the first and second floors; and a rendered base finished to resemble channel-jointed ashlar. The red brick exterior is relieved with contrasting pilasters of a dark brown brick with simple, rendered capitals. The projecting entrance bay features a pediment over a central first floor doorway, which has a rendered aedicule. The pediment is supported by pilasters and a circular accent vent with rendered surround is centred on the face brick tympanum. Beneath the pediment, the words "TOOWOOMBA NORTH STATE SCHOOL" and "1938" are engraved. Smaller pediments are centred on the classroom wings on either side of the entrance bay and over the projecting bays housing the main staircases and former cloakrooms on the southern (rear) side of the building. A secondary entrance leading to the undercroft is located at the base of the eastern bay, with additional entrances at the western end of the building (one each on the north and south facades) and various openings leading to the undercroft.

Window openings are regularly spaced and contain sets of timber, three-light casements with fanlights above. Four bays of windows at the west end of the north façade, which now contain louvres, appear to be the only major replacements. Double-hung sash windows are located on either side of the southern entrance, and grated openings provide light and ventilation to play space in the undercroft. The main entrance doors are large, panelled timber double doors with fanlights above. Other early entrance doors include a half-glazed, boarded door to the girls toilets and half-glazed double doors to the northwest entrance.

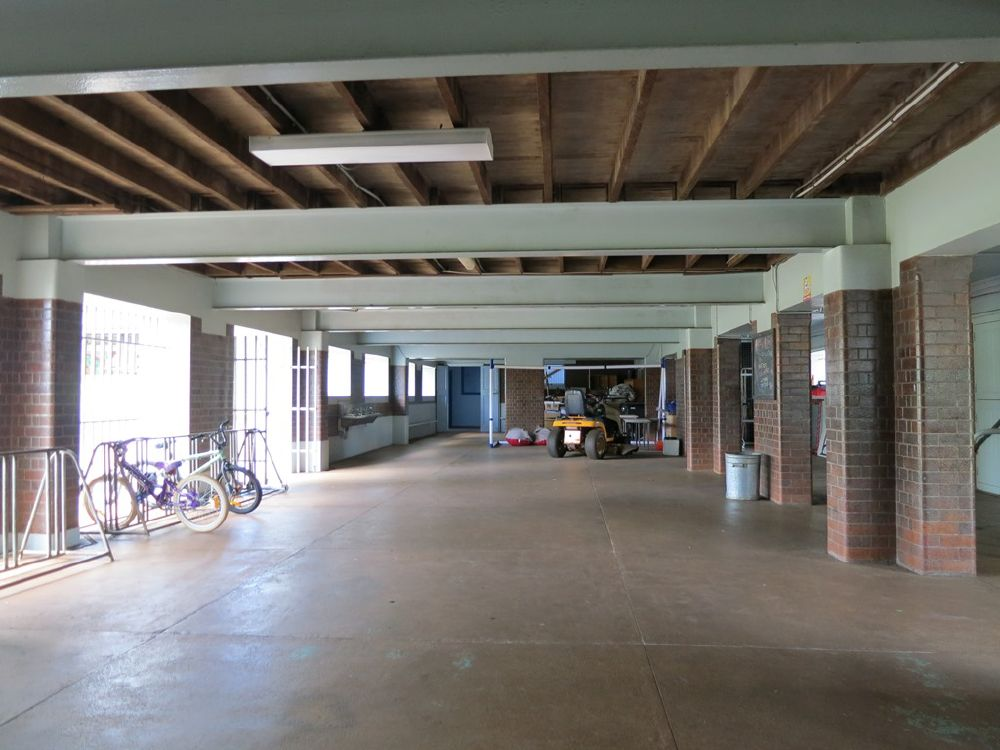
Brick School Building undercroft, looking West

The interior layout is approximately symmetrical, with classrooms arranged along the southern side of the building connected by corridors along the north side. Originally comprising the manual training rooms, boys' toilets and play space in the undercroft; five classrooms, domestic science rooms, entrance hall, two teachers rooms, girls toilets and a store room on the first floor; and seven (later nine) classrooms and two teachers rooms on the second floor, the layout of the building remains generally intact. Alterations to the layout include the removal of original folding partitions between classrooms, resulting in some double-sized rooms, and the insertion of partitions in places. The manual training room and domestic science rooms, located at the eastern end of the building, have been converted into classrooms. The first floor corridor has been extended to run the full length of the building; the location of former walls is indicated by changes in the floor surface and small bulkheads across the ceiling. Former cloakrooms, located adjacent to the internal staircases, have been converted for use as staff rooms or other functional spaces.

The classrooms and teachers rooms/offices have plaster walls with picture rails, chamfered skirting boards, and flat-sheeted ceilings with timber battens arranged in a square pattern. Bulkheads run north–south across the ceilings and in some instances indicate the location of former folding doors between classrooms. One set of timber folding doors with original door hardware survives in the westernmost classroom on the second floor. Brass plaques commemorating the official opening of the school are located in the entrance hall.

Corridors have plastered walls, concrete floors (coloured red with uncoloured, coved concrete edging), and bulkheads between different sections of the building. The second floor corridor ceiling retains its flat-sheeted ceiling with batten cover strips, however the ground floor ceiling has been replaced. Internal corridor windows are generally three-light, double hung sashes with three-light fanlights above. Classroom doors are panelled double doors with three-light fanlights above. A variety of other early internal timber doors survive, including half-glazed double and single doors and four-panelled doors. The internal staircases have red concrete steps (matching the corridor floors) and metal balustrades with timber posts and top rails.

The male and female toilets have concrete floors and similar plaster walls and battened ceilings to the classrooms. Both retain early cubicle partitions with panelled timber doors.

Due to the slope of the land, the undercroft is partially underground at the western end and inaccessible past the western internal staircase. The central area of the undercroft is largely open play space, punctuated by rectangular columns of brown brick with rounded corners. The floor is concrete and steel I-beams support the timber framing of the floor above. Early timber benches survive along some walls. Beneath the entrance bay, the space has been enclosed with partitions and boarded timber doors to form a tuck shop and storage space. Further storage areas have been fenced off at the western end of the play space. The former Manual Training rooms at the eastern end of the undercroft continue to be used as classrooms and storage space.

=== Block B – 1950s timber school building ===
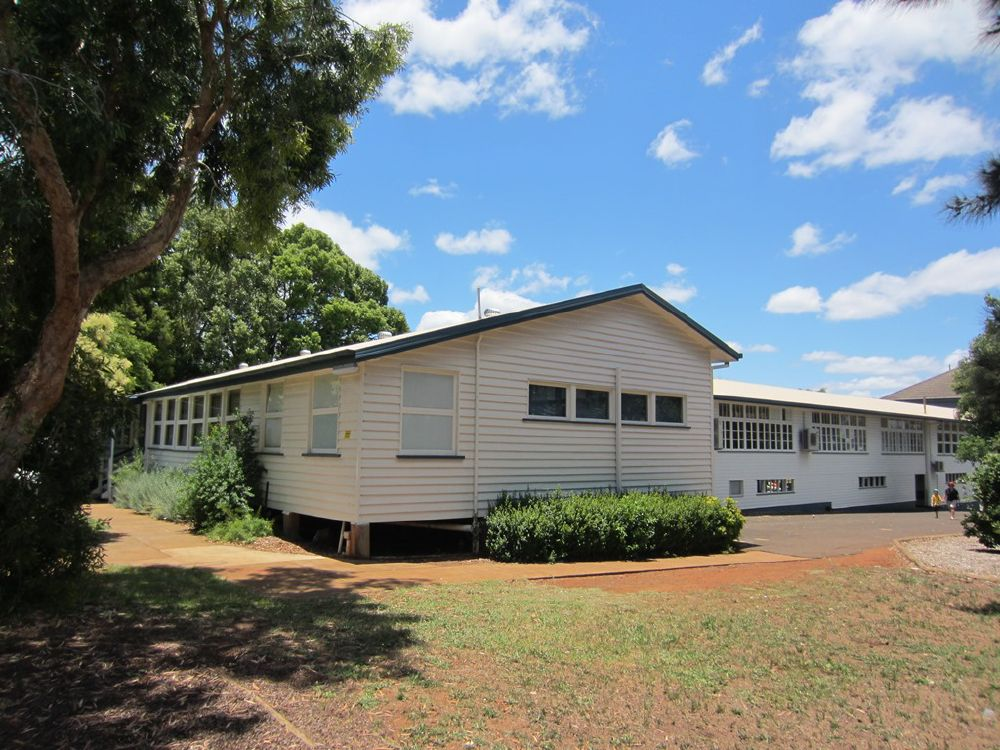
Vocational extension and 1950s Timber School Building from North-West

Block B is a T-shaped timber building comprising a former vocational training building (1957) at the western end (orientated north–south) attached to a classroom wing (1951, 53, 56) of six classrooms (orientated east–west). Both sections of the building have gable roofs clad in corrugated metal sheeting. Due to the sloping site, the building is lowset at the western end and highset at the eastern end, with play space beneath five of the classrooms. A verandah along the north side of the classroom wing is linked by a passageway through the centre of the vocational training building to an enclosed western verandah.

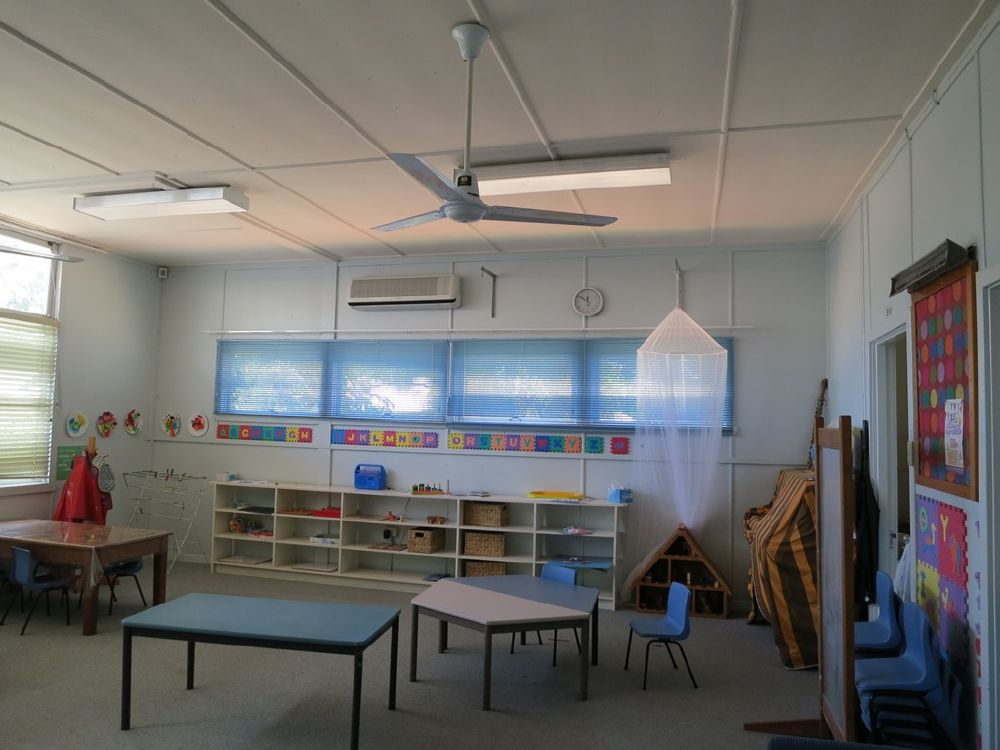
1950s Timber School Building interior

The classroom wing is clad in chamferboards and has large banks of windows along the southern wall. From east to west, the dates of construction for the classrooms are: two classrooms in 1956; one classroom in 1953; and three classrooms in 1951. The different stages of the building's construction are evident by the joinery used: the 1951 and 1953 classrooms have banks of three-light casement windows and fanlights in their southern walls, while the 1956 classrooms have timber awning windows. The westernmost classroom stands on round timber stumps, and the remainder of the classrooms are supported by a combination of round metal poles (modern), square timber posts, square concrete stumps, and timber-framed perimeter and bracing walls.

Windows and fanlights to the north verandah have been replaced with sliding aluminium windows, however the openings and timber mullions remain. All classrooms are accessed by timber double doors, most with modern hardware, however those accessing the 1956 classrooms are half-glazed board doors with no fanlight and one retains early hardware. The north verandah has a timber floor, bag rack balustrades and a raked ceiling lined with flat sheeting with cover strips. Original glazed screens survive at the far eastern corner. Three sets of stairs provide access - two sets attached to and running parallel with the verandah, and one set added at the eastern end which comes up through the verandah floor, surrounded by a timber rail balustrade.

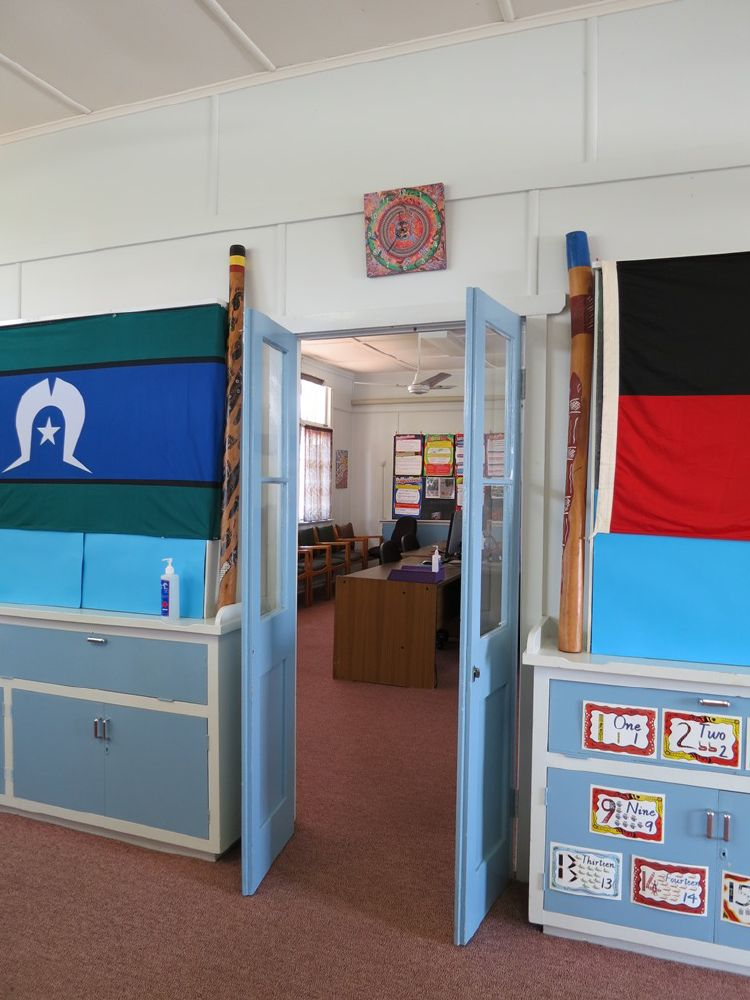
1950s Timber School Building interior

All classrooms measure 21 by 24 feet (6.4 by 7.3 m) and have flat internal wall and ceiling linings. Sections of early linings are distinguished by the use of batten or curved cover strips. In the 1956 section, a large opening between the classrooms remains, however folding doors (shown on the original plans) have been removed. Early, half-glazed double doors survive in the centre of the wall between the 1953 and eastern 1951 classrooms. Between the 1951 classrooms, one connecting door has been enclosed, and the other has been removed and a large opening created in its place.

The vocational training building is clad in weatherboards and stands on square concrete stumps. Windows are predominantly timber awning windows, with double-hung sash windows in the passageway and verandah walls.

The interior of the vocational training building generally has flat wall and ceiling linings with cover strips. The layout of original rooms – domestic science rooms to the south and manual training rooms to the north – is largely intact, although later partitions have divided up the two larger training rooms. A series of rooms, formerly used for storage and as smaller training rooms, remain in the verandah space. Alterations to the building include the full enclosure of the verandah, installation of a bathroom off the south side of the passageway, the removal of the fitting room partitions in the southeast corner of the domestic science room, and the insertion of additional doors and openings. The building has a variety of doors, most of which are modern, with early examples including half-glazed double and single doors. The verandah has a raked ceiling, and both the passageway and verandah have chamferboard cladding to the walls.

The understorey of the classroom wing has a concrete floor and low, off-form concrete retaining walls surround the western end of the space. Timber bracing walls beneath the 1956 classrooms are lined with diagonal timber boards. A store room with chamferboard-clad walls and timber board doors is located in the southwest corner.

=== Grounds ===
The school grounds contain mature trees, including rows of camphor laurels (Cinnamomum camphora) along the western and northern boundaries, and individual feature trees, including camphor laurels, pines, eucalypts, a flame tree (Brachychiton acerifolius) and maples (Acer, sp.) adjacent to other boundaries and south of Blocks A and B. A swimming pool (1959) is located at the western end of the grounds. Set back from the streets and surrounded by gardens, pathways and a playing field, Block A is a prominent feature and makes an important contribution to the streetscape.

== Heritage listing ==
Toowoomba North State School was listed on the Queensland Heritage Register on 6 May 2016 having satisfied the following criteria.

The place is important in demonstrating the evolution or pattern of Queensland's history.

Toowoomba North State School (established in 1869) is important in demonstrating the evolution of state education and its associated architecture in Queensland.

The place retains an excellent, representative example of a government designed Depression-era brick school building (1938, extended 1949) that was an architectural response to prevailing government educational philosophies, and a Department of Public Works-designed 1950s timber school building (1951) with extensions (1953, 1956, 1957) that was a response to acute building shortages and population growth in the post-World War II period; set in landscaped grounds with assembly and play areas, sporting facilities and mature trees.

The Depression-era brick school building is the result of the State Government's building programme during the 1930s that stimulated the economy and provided work for men unemployed as a result of the Great Depression.

The place is important in demonstrating the principal characteristics of a particular class of cultural places.

Toowoomba North State School is important in demonstrating the principal characteristics of Queensland state schools. These include teaching buildings constructed to standard designs by the Queensland Government; and generous, landscaped sites, with mature trees, assembly and play areas, and sporting facilities. The school is a good, intact example of a suburban school complex, comprising a Depression-era brick school building and a Department of Public Works-designed 1950s timber school building comprising a classroom wing and vocational training building.

The Depression-era brick school building is a good, intact example of its type. It demonstrates the principal characteristics of Depression-era brick schools, including: its two-storey form with undercroft; high-quality design with classical influence and detailing; face brick exterior; and symmetrical arrangement either side of a projecting entrance bay. The building plan comprises a typical linear layout of classrooms, offices and store rooms, accessed by long corridors.

The 1950s timber school building combines two standard DPW timber building types that demonstrate the evolution of timber classrooms in the post-war period - a classroom wing and a former vocational training building.

Designed to be extended over time, the classroom wing illustrates the evolution of a standard, modular classroom type, particularly through differences in window types between the earlier (1951, 53) and later (1956) sections. Characteristics of this type include its highset form with a north verandah, flat internal linings and classroom dimensions.

The former vocational training building retains the characteristics of its type, comprising a long timber building with verandah, and large rooms for manual training and domestic science classes, supplemented by smaller storage and training rooms.

The place is important because of its aesthetic significance.

Through its elegant composition of formal and decorative elements, substantial size, face brick exterior and high quality materials, the Depression-era brick school building at Toowoomba North State School has aesthetic significance due to its expressive attributes, by which the Department of Public Works sought to convey the concepts of progress and permanence.

The building's assertive massing, classically influenced design, and elegant composition contribute to its dignified streetscape presence, and contrast with the surrounding small-scale residences and commercial premises. Prominently sited on a corner, the building is a landmark for the area.

The place has a strong or special association with a particular community or cultural group for social, cultural or spiritual reasons.

Schools have always played an important part in Queensland communities. They typically retain significant and enduring connections with former pupils, parents, and teachers; provide a venue for social interaction and volunteer work; and are a source of pride, symbolising local progress and aspirations.

Toowoomba North State School has a strong and ongoing association with the Toowoomba community. It was established in 1869 through the fundraising efforts of the local community and generations of Toowoomba children have been taught there. The place is important for its contribution to the educational development of Toowoomba and is a prominent community focal point and gathering place for social and commemorative events with widespread community support.

== See also ==
- History of state education in Queensland
- List of schools in Darling Downs
