= Acacia anadenia =

Conservation status
- Vulnerable (NCA)

Scientific classification
- Kingdom: Plantae
- Clade: Tracheophytes
- Clade: Angiosperms
- Clade: Eudicots
- Clade: Rosids
- Order: Fabales
- Family: Fabaceae
- Subfamily: Caesalpinioideae
- Clade: Mimosoid clade
- Genus: Acacia
- Species: A. anadenia

Binomial name
- Acacia anadenia Pedley

Species of legume

Acacia anadenia is a species of flowering plant in the family Fabaceae and is endemic to the Chesterton Range National Park in south-east Queensland. It is a shrub with bipinnate leaves with 2 to 4 leaflets, spherical heads of 18 to 24 flowers, and linear or slightly curved pods up to about 90 mm (3.5 in) long.

== Description ==
Acacia anadenia is a shrub that typically grows to a height of about 1 m (3 ft 3 in) and has ribbed and hairy branchlets. Its leaves are bipinnate on a petiole 5–11 mm (0.20–0.43 in) long, with 2 pairs of pinnae 22–40 mm (0.87–1.57 in) long each with 7 to 11 narrowly oblong pinnules 4–9 mm (0.16–0.35 in) long and 1.5–2.2 mm (0.059–0.087 in) wide. The flowers are borne in racemes mostly 25–30 mm (0.98–1.18 in) long with up to 10 spherical heads on a peduncle 1–3 mm (0.039–0.118 in) long, each head with 18 to 24 flowers. Flowering commences in late August and the pods are leathery and strongly constricted between the seeds. The seeds are 70–75 mm (2.8–3.0 in) long and 3.0–3.5 mm (0.12–0.14 in) long.

== Taxonomy ==
Acacia anadenia was first formally described in 2019 by Leslie Pedley in the journal Austrobaileya from specimens collected in Chesterton Range National Park. The specific epithet (anadenia) means 'without a gland', referring to the lack of glands on the specimens examined.

== Distribution ==
This species of Acacia is only known from Chesterton Range National Park.

== Conservation status ==
Acacia anadenia is listed as of "vulnerable" under the Queensland Government Nature Conservation Act 1992.

== See also ==
- List of Acacia species
