= Forestvale, Queensland =

Forestvale
- Suburb
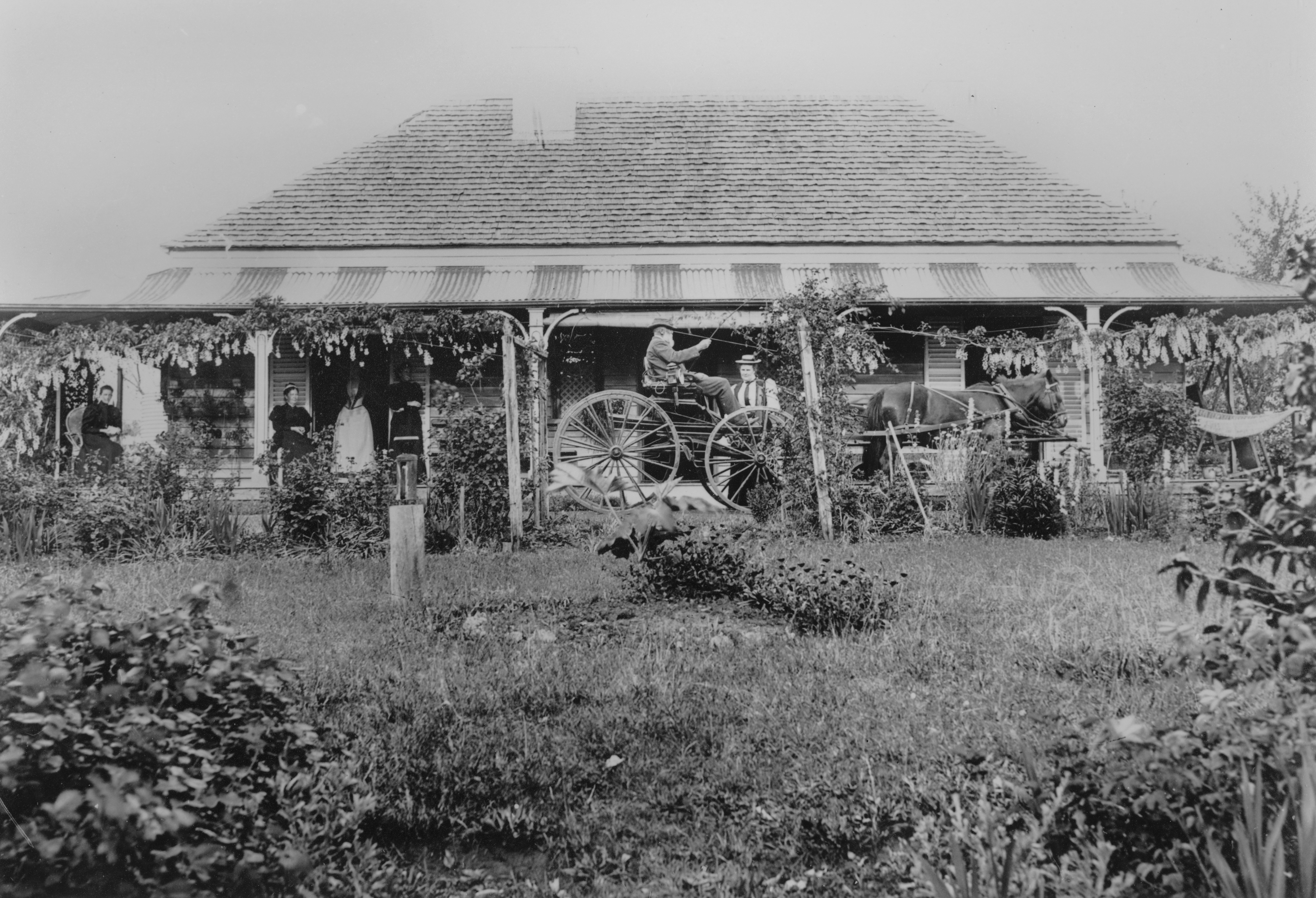
- Forest Vale homestead, circa 1892

- Interactive map of Forestvale
- Coordinates: 25.9902°S 147.8833°E
- Country: Australia
- State: Queensland
- LGA: Maranoa Region
- Location: 69.7 km (43.3 mi) N of Mitchell; 154 km (96 mi) NW of Roma; 505 km (314 mi) NW of Toowoomba; 632 km (393 mi) WNW of Brisbane

Government
  - State electorate: Warrego
  - Federal division: Maranoa

Area
  - Total: 2,552.5 km^{2} (985.5 sq mi)

Population
  - Total: 47 (2021 census)
  - Density: 0.01841/km^{2} (0.0477/sq mi)
- Time zone: UTC+10:00 (AEST)
- Postcode: 4465
Suburbs around Forestvale
| Womblebank | Womblebank | Womblebank |
| Redford | Forestvale | Kilmorey Falls |
| Tyrconnel | Womalilla | Mitchell |

Forestvale is a rural locality in the Maranoa Region, Queensland, Australia. In the 2021 census, Forestvale had a population of 47 people.

== Geography ==
Moondi is a neighbourhood in the centre of the locality (26.165°S 147.9177°E).

Forestvale has the following mountains:

- Mount Kennedy near the eastern boundary of the locality (25.9940°S 148.0832°E) 704 metres (2,310 ft)
- Mount Sowerby near the south-eastern boundary of the locality (26.1821°S 147.9792°E) 524 metres (1,719 ft)

The Warrego Highway passes to the south and is accessible via Forestvale Road.

In the south-west of the locality is a small protected area, part of Barabanbel State Forest. Apart from that, the land use is almost entirely grazing on native vegetation.

== History ==
Forestvale began as a cattle station run by Robert Lethbridge and his brothers, Edward and Mark Elliott.

Barabanbel State School opened on 13 September 1921 and closed on 28 October 1932. It was on the south-eastern corner of Mitchell Forest Vale Road and Well Gully Road (approx 26.3347°S 148.0018°E). It takes its name from the parish of Barabanbel in which it was situated.

Moondi was named as a neighbourhood by the Queensland Place Names Board on 1 December 1979.

== Demographics ==
In the 2016 census, Forestvale had a population of 47 people.

In the 2021 census, Forestvale had a population of 47 people.

== Education ==
There are no schools in Forestvale. The nearest government primary schools are Mitchell State School in neighbouring Mitchell to the south-east and Mungallala State School in Mungallala to the south-west. The nearest government secondary school is also Mitchell State School (to Year 10). However, the north of Forestvale is too distant from these schools for a daily commute, so other options are distance education and boarding school. Distance education and boarding schools are also the alternatives for secondary education to Year 12.

== Attractions ==
The Moondi shelter shed is at the end of Major Mitchell Road (26.21234°S 147.91671°E). It is the site where the explorer Thomas Mitchell camped in 1846 while mapping an overland route from Sydney to Port Essington (now Darwin, Northern Territory). For the sesquicentenary in 1996, the shelter shed was constructed with plaques, maps, and information about the expedition. It was officially dedicated on Saturday 18 May 1996.
