= Womalilla, Queensland =

Womalilla
- Town
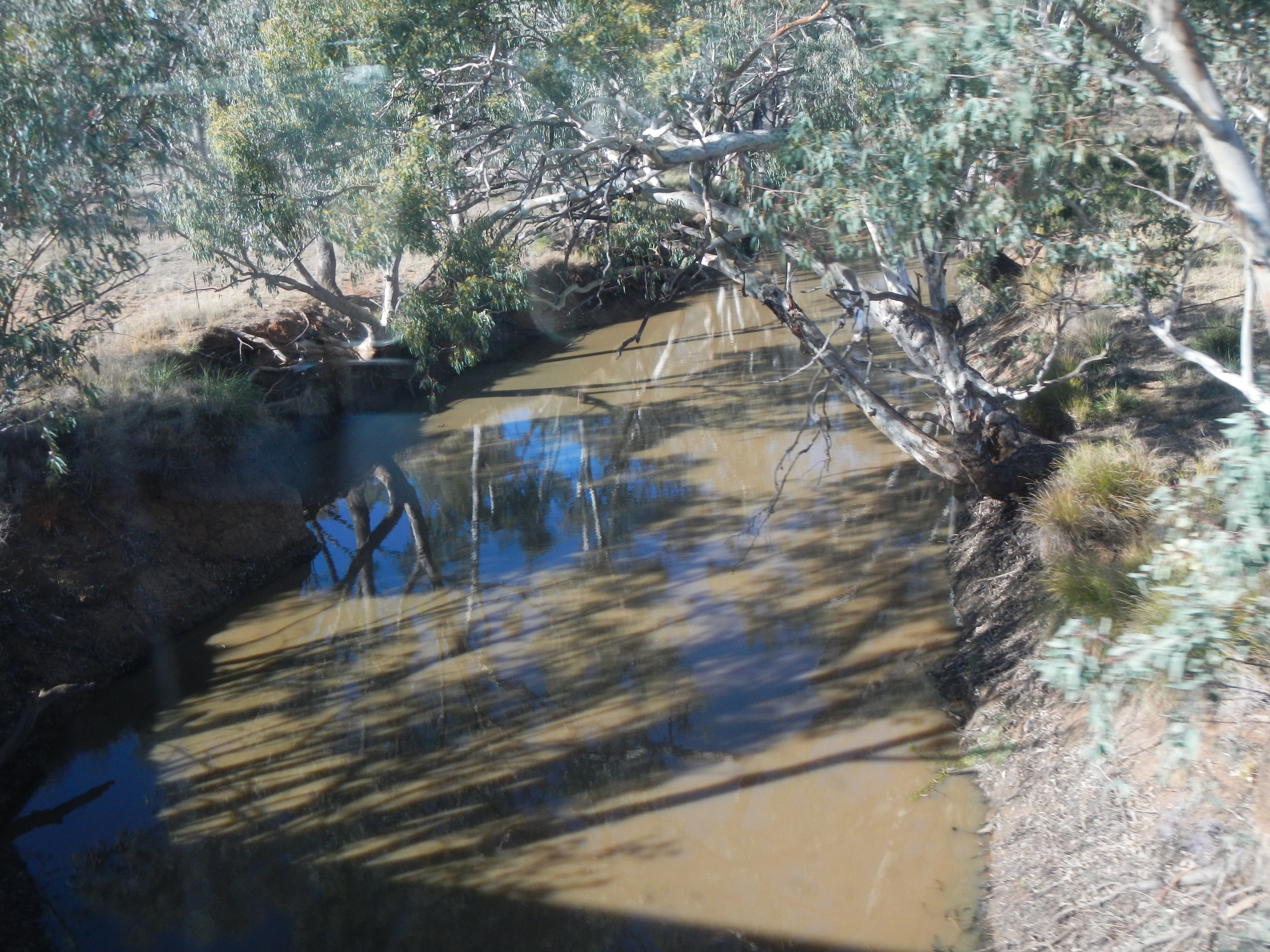
- Creek in Womallila, 2013

- Interactive map of Womalilla
- Coordinates: 26.4997°S 147.8172°E
- Country: Australia
- State: Queensland
- LGA: Maranoa Region
- Location: 18.9 km (11.7 mi) E of Mungallala; 29.9 km (18.6 mi) W of Mitchell; 117 km (73 mi) W of Roma; 594 km (369 mi) WNW of Brisbane

Government
  - State electorate: Warrego
  - Federal division: Maranoa

Area
  - Total: 1,219.0 km^{2} (470.7 sq mi)

Population
  - Total: 72 (2021 census)
  - Density: 0.0591/km^{2} (0.1530/sq mi)
- Time zone: UTC+10:00 (AEST)
- Postcode: 4465
Localities around Womalilla
Tyrconnel	Tyrconnel	Forestvale
Mungallala	Womalilla	Mitchell
Mungallala South	V Gate	Eurella

Womalilla is a rural town and locality in the Maranoa Region, Queensland, Australia. In the 2021 census, the locality of Womalilla had a population of 72 people.

== Geography ==
Womalilla Creek rise through the locality in the north-west and flows south-east to become a tributary of the Maranoa River.

The Warrego Highway runs through from east to west.

The Western railway line runs from east to west, south of the highway.

Ooline railway station was in the north-west north of the locality and is the highest point on the Western Railway Line between Kingsthorpe and Charleville (26.48278°S 147.63694°E).

It was named by the Queensland Railways Department on 11 May 1916 and is an Aboriginal word describing a particular species of tree.

== History ==
The town's name is derived from a pastoral run name used from 1862, reportedly an Aboriginal word group for trees by a creek (from womal meaning tree/timber and illa meaning creek).

Womalilla Creek No 1 Provisional School and Womalilla Creek No 2 Provisional School were to be opened together in 1913 to operate as a pair of part-time schools (meaning they would share one teacher between the two schools. However, the No 2 school opened on 24 August 1913 but it was not until 3 July 1914 that the No 1 school opened. Both schools closed in 1929 due to low student numbers.

On 17 April 1935, the new Womalilla Provisional School opened and operated on a full-time basis. In 1937, it became Womalilla State School. The school closed in 1954. It was located in the town centre (approx 27.87320°S 151.42816°E).

== Demographics ==
In the 2016 census, the locality of Womalilla had a population of 39 people.

In the 2021 census, the locality of Womalilla had a population of 72 people.

== Education ==
There are no schools in Womalilla. The nearest government primary schools are Mitchell State School in neighbouring Mitchell to the east, Mungallala State School in neighbouring Mungallala to the west, and Dunkeld State School in Dunkeld to the south-east. The nearest government secondary school is Mitchell State School (to Year 10). There are no nearby schools providing education to Year 12; the alternatives are distance education and boarding school.
