= Angellala Rail Bridge =

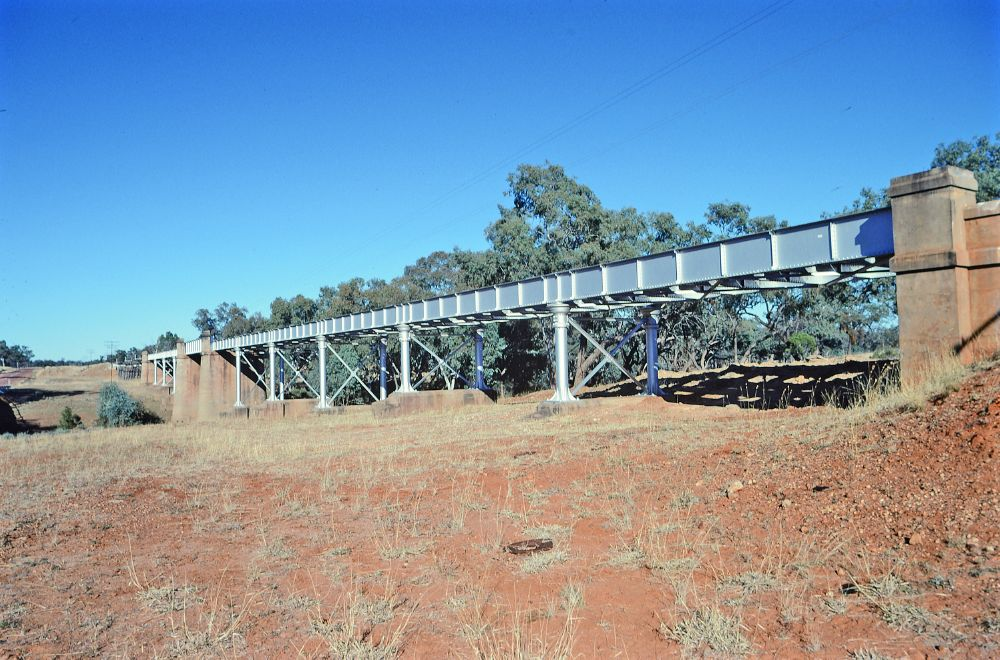
- Angellala Rail Bridge, 1994

- Location within Queensland
- 26.4136°S 146.8863°E
- Location: Roma-Cunamulla railway over Angellala Creek in Sommariva, Shire of Murweh, Queensland, Australia

History
- Design period: 1870s–1890s (late 19th century)
- Built: c. 1885–1994

Site notes
- Architect: Henry Charles Stanley

Queensland Heritage Register
- Official name: Angellala Rail Bridge
- Type: state heritage (built)
- Designated: 21 October 1992
- Reference no.: 600756
- Significant period: 1880s (fabric)
- Significant components: abutments – railway bridge, pier/s (bridge)

Angellala Rail Bridge was a heritage-listed railway bridge on the Roma-Cunnamulla railway line over Angellala Creek in Sommariva in the Shire of Murweh, Queensland, Australia. It was designed by Henry Charles Stanley and built from c. 1885 to 1994. It was added to the Queensland Heritage Register on 21 October 1992. The bridge and the adjacent road bridge were destroyed by an explosion on 5 September 2014.

== History ==
Plans for the crossing of Angellala Creek at 66 kilometres (41 mi) east of Charleville were prepared in 1885 with the construction of the western railway extension from Roma to Charleville. Part of the Western Railway Act assented to on 25 September 1875 was repealed by the Railway Reserves Amendment Act of 1879, and the money in the Western Railway Account and all funds from land alienation were paid into Consolidated Revenue of Queensland. Construction west from Roma proceeded through the 1880s and there were approaches to build a land grant railway, into western New South Wales and to Adelaide through the south-west by several syndicates.

However the Queensland Government undertook construction further west. The railway opened to East Mitchell in 1883, and after completion of the Maranoa River Bridge on 17 January 1885 into Mitchell itself. Further extensions took place to Dulbydilla on 24 August 1885, Morven on 1 March 1887 and opening through to Charleville on 1 March 1888.

Angellala railway station (26.4132°S 146.8869°E) was named after the nearby creek. It opened as a station from 2 May 1910, and was also worked as a crossing loop. From 1929 until 1932 the station was worked unattended; however a station mistress was appointed from 1932 date until 1971. Angellala was a watering stop for locomotives, with the water tank situated at the Charleville end of the yard, and the hydrant at the Roma end.

The crossing of Angellala Creek posed several design problems for the bridge designers, as it was situated in a shallow valley and extensive flood plain. The bridge across the western crossing featured the longest timber trestle approach on a rail bridge in Queensland. Overall length of the structure was 2,080 feet (630 m). The main crossing of the creek features 7 x 36 feet (11 m) steel spans. The approach from the west was over 1,740 feet (530 m). It was designed in 1885 when Henry Charles Stanley was Chief Engineer.

Plans were prepared for the strengthening of the bridge for heavier C17 class locomotives in 1946 when the spans were halved by installation of intermediate columns. With upgrading for main line (90 long tons (91 t)) diesel-electric's to be used west of Roma, the main spans were strengthened with additional steel pillars in 1994.

The Angellala bridge was the sixth longest in Queensland. At 530 metres (1,740 ft), the western approach was the longest approach of any railway bridge in Queensland. The riveted and gusseted half-through continuous plate girder spans were the second oldest of their type in Queensland.

The Angellala railway bridge and the adjacent road bridge were destroyed by an explosion on 5 September 2014, when a road train carrying 52 tonnes (51 long tons; 57 short tons) of ammonium nitrate crashed on the road bridge and caught fire. The explosion was equivalent to 10-15 tonnes of TNT and was felt by residents of the town of Charleville, 30 kilometres (19 mi) away. The road bridge was rebuilt, but the railway bridge was not. There is a monument to the explosion, with interpretive signs, at the site.

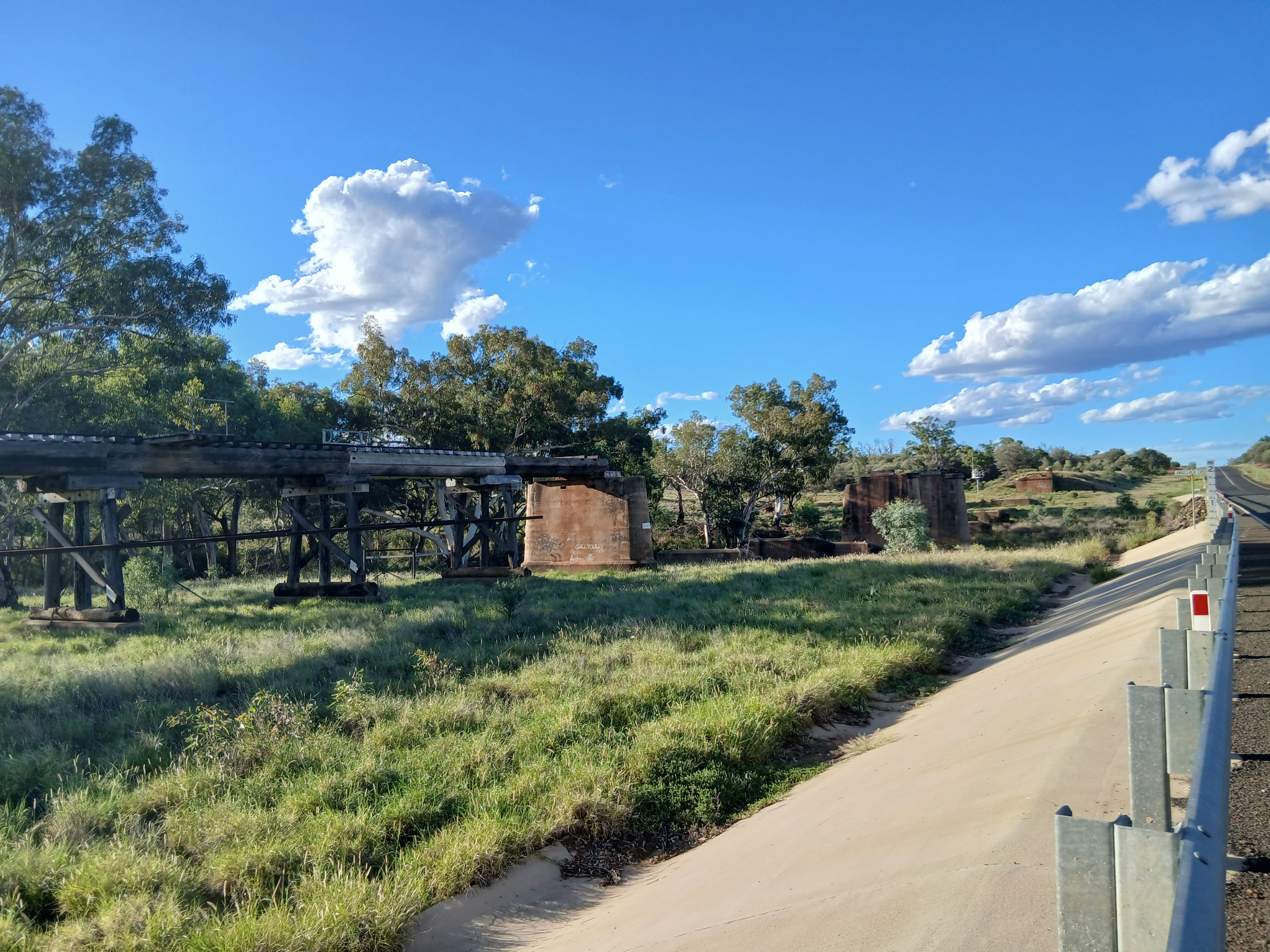
The remains of the Angellala railway bridge which was destroyed by an explosion

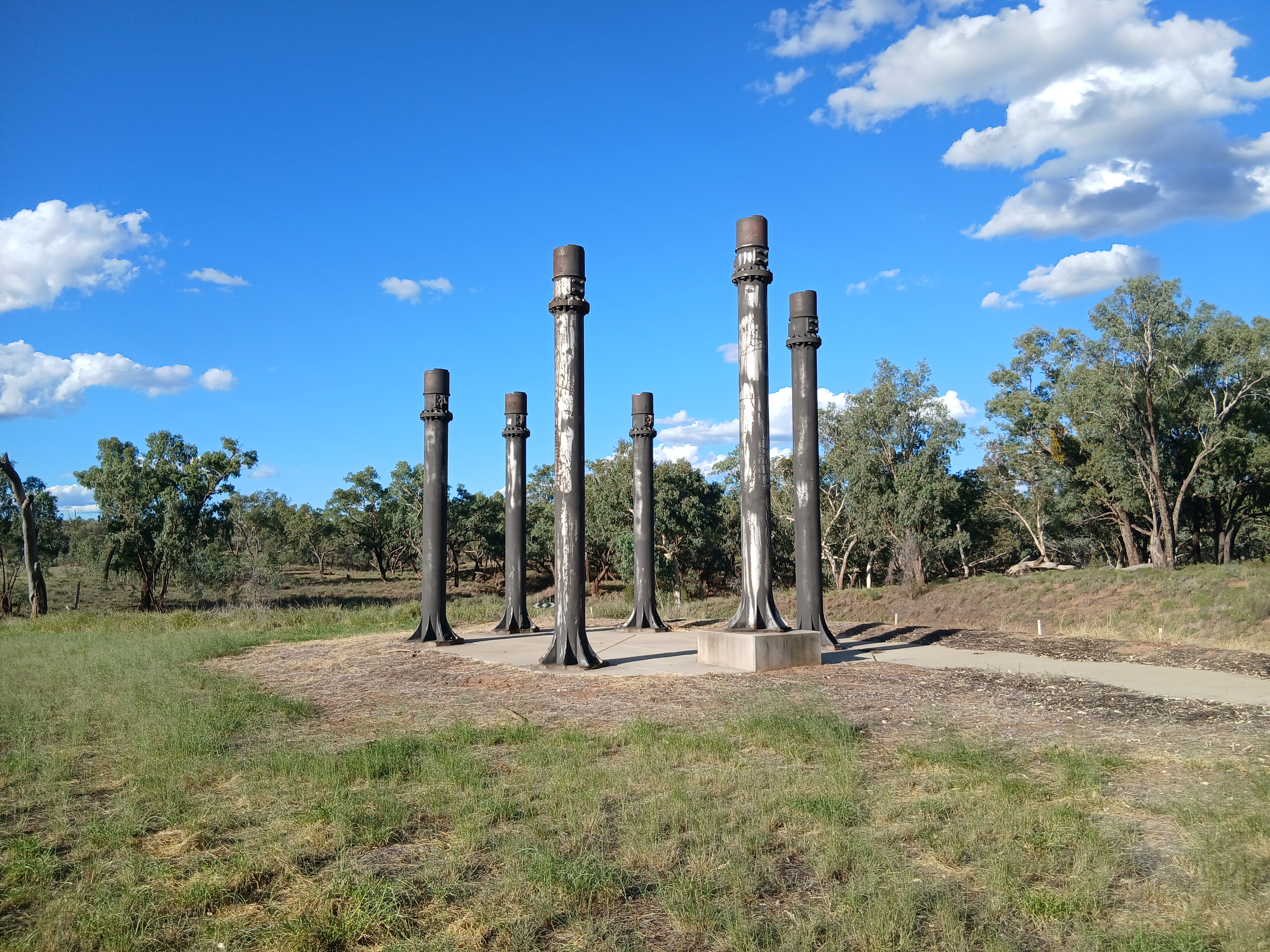
Angellala bridge explosion monument

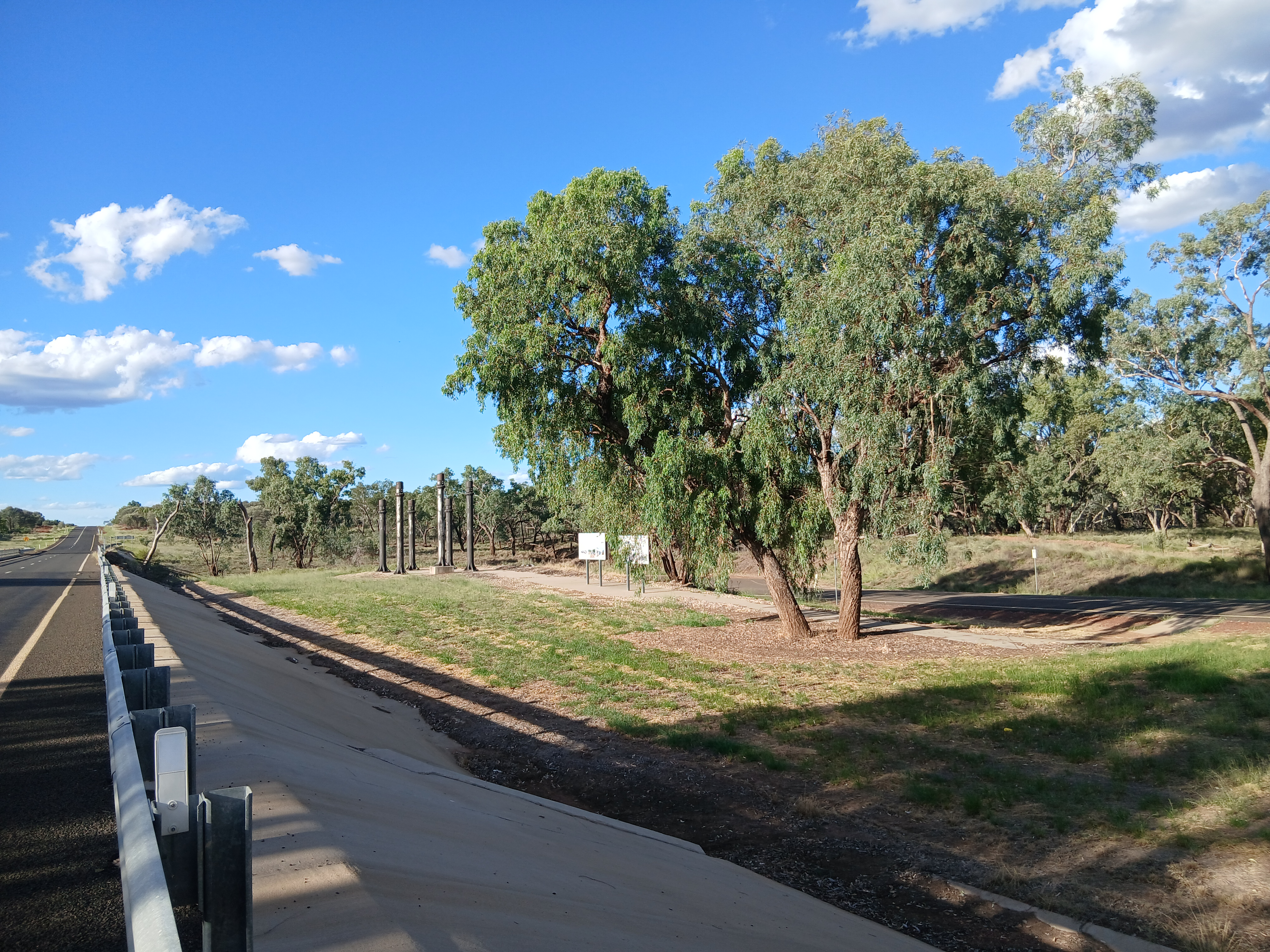
Site commemorating the explosion which destroyed the Angellala bridge.

== Description ==
The Angellala Creek Bridge and approaches located at 442 miles 42 chains (712.2 km) from Roma Street and consisted of:

- 3 x 2 x 1 x 20 feet (6.1 m) timber longitudinal with a common braced timber trestle (pier one) and common concrete piers on piers two and three
- 7 x 2 x 40 feet (12 m) riveted half-through continuous plate girders with steel cross girders and transom tops, steel longitudinals, common concrete pier on pier four, common cast iron cylinders on concrete bases (piers five to ten), strengthened with two steel columns on concrete bases at each mid span (piers 4A to 10A) and a common concrete pier at pier eleven.
- 87 x 2 x1 x 20 feet (6.1 m) timber longitudinals, common braced timber trestles (piers 12 through to 100) or common concrete piers (piers 23–26, 31–32, 34, 38, 41, 51, 53, 58, 61, 64, 66–68, 71–72, 74, 76–80, 82–83, 85, 96–98).

The bridge featured a maximum span of 20 feet (6.1 m) and is aligned on a straight track with the approaches being on a forty-chain curve. The abutments, piers and main spans of the bridge were original; however the approaches to the bridge were reconstructed, and in 1994 intermediate supports allowing larger diesel-electric locomotives to operate between Roma and Charleville were incorporated into the structure.

== Heritage listing ==
Angellala Rail Bridge was listed on the Queensland Heritage Register on 21 October 1992 having satisfied the following criteria.

The place is important in demonstrating the evolution or pattern of Queensland's history.

The Angellala Creek Bridge is important in demonstrating the pattern of Queensland's history in particular the development of the railway network in Western Queensland.

The place demonstrates rare, uncommon or endangered aspects of Queensland's cultural heritage.

The riveted gusseted half through continuous plate girder spans are the second oldest of their type in Queensland.

The place is important because of its aesthetic significance.

The bridge is close to the Warrego highway and is and important landmark in the area being a feature of the western approach to Angellala.

The place has a strong or special association with a particular community or cultural group for social, cultural or spiritual reasons.

The bridge is close to the Warrego Highway and is and important landmark in the area being a feature of the western approach to Angellala.

The place has a special association with the life or work of a particular person, group or organisation of importance in Queensland's history.

The bridge is important for its association with the life and work of its designer Henry C Stanley, Chief Engineer for Railways.
