= Tyrconnel, Queensland =

Tyrconnel
- Suburb
- Interactive map of Tyrconnel
- Coordinates: 26.2825°S 147.5208°E
- Country: Australia
- State: Queensland
- LGAs: Maranoa Region; Shire of Murweh
- Location: 69.7 km (43.3 mi) NW of Mitchell; 157 km (98 mi) WNW of Roma; 160 km (99 mi) ENE of Charleville; 637 km (396 mi) WNW of Brisbane

Government
  - State electorate: Warrego
  - Federal division: Maranoa

Area
  - Total: 1,147.9 km^{2} (443.2 sq mi)

Population
  - Total: 17 (2021 census)
  - Density: 0.0148/km^{2} (0.0384/sq mi)
- Time zone: UTC+10:00 (AEST)
- Postcode: 4467
Suburbs around Tyrconnel
Redford	Redford	Forestvale
Morven	Tyrconnel	Forestvale
Morven	Mungallala	Womalilla

Tyrconnel is a rural locality split between the Maranoa Region and the Shire of Murweh, both in Queensland, Australia. In the 2021 census, Tyrconnel had a population of 17 people.

== Geography ==
The majority of the locality is in the Maranoa Region with only some small areas on the western boundary of the locality being within Shire of Murweh.

The northern part of the locality is within the Chesterton Range with numerous unnamed peaks rising to over 600 metres (2,000 ft) and some named peaks in the north-east of the locality:

- Mount Lonsdale (26.2783°S 147.6001°E) 562 metres (1,844 ft)
- Mount Polworth (26.2565°S 147.6002°E) 510 metres (1,670 ft)
- Mount Scott (26.2403°S 147.6233°E) 520 metres (1,710 ft)

The southern part of the locality is undulating but at elevations of 450 to 500 metres (1,480 to 1,640 ft). The higher northern land is generally undeveloped with the north-western corner of the locality being within the protected are of Chesterton Range National Park which extends west into neighbouring Redford. Apart from the national park, the land use is predominantly grazing on native vegetation.

== History ==
The locality takes its name from the pastoral station Tyrconnell Downs, which was named by John McManus after the Earl of Tyrconnell in Ireland.

== Demographics ==
In the 2016 census, Tyrconnel had a population of 30 people.

In the 2021 census, Tyrconnel had a population of 17 people.

== Education ==
There are no schools in Tyrconnel. The nearest government primary schools are Mungallala State School in neighbouring Mungallala to the south and Morven State School in neighbouring Morven to the south-west. The nearest government secondary school (to Year 10) is Mitchell State School in Mitchell to the south-east, but it would only be accessible for a daily commute for students living in the south-east of Tyrconnel. There are no secondary schools to Year 12 nearby; the alternatives are distance education and boarding school.
