= Sommariva, Queensland =

Sommariva
- Suburb
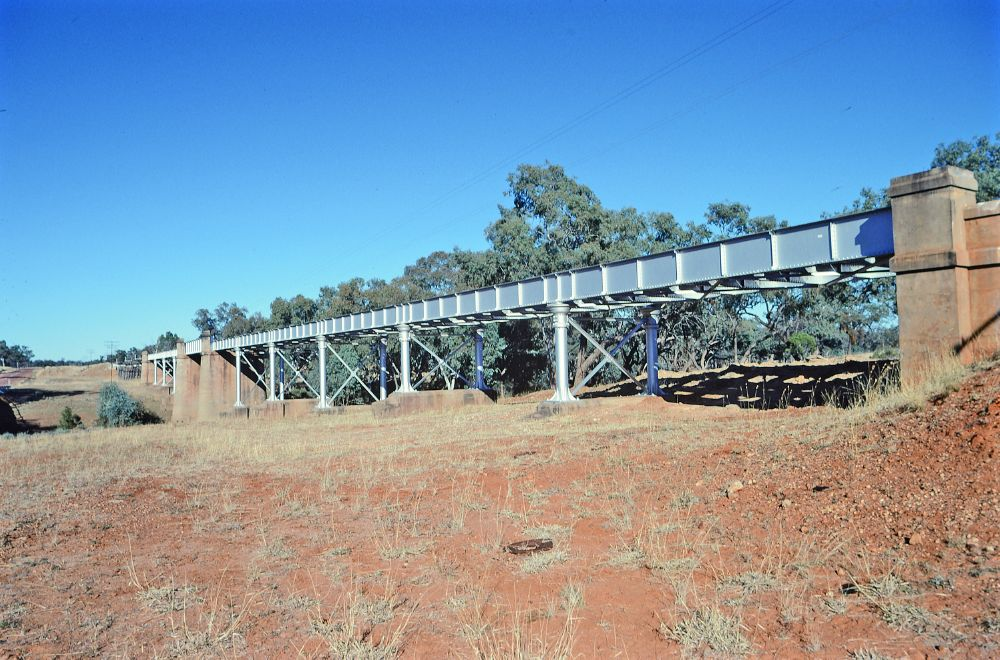
- Angellala Rail Bridge, 1994

- Interactive map of Sommariva
- Coordinates: 26.4094°S 146.7091°E
- Country: Australia
- State: Queensland
- LGA: Shire of Murweh
- Location: 37.9 km (23.5 mi) E of Charleville; 57.4 km (35.7 mi) W of Morven; 229 km (142 mi) W of Roma; 708 km (440 mi) WNW of Brisbane

Government
  - State electorate: Warrego
  - Federal division: Maranoa

Area
  - Total: 1,977.0 km^{2} (763.3 sq mi)

Population
  - Total: 25 (2021 census)
  - Density: 0.01265/km^{2} (0.0328/sq mi)
- Time zone: UTC+10:00 (AEST)
- Postcode: 4470
Suburbs around Sommariva
Gowrie Station	Clara Creek	Clara Creek
Charleville	Sommariva	Morven
Bakers Bend	Riversleigh	Morven

Sommariva is a locality in the Shire of Murweh, Queensland, Australia. It is situated 37.9 kilometres (23.5 mi) east of Charleville and 57.4 kilometres (35.7 mi) west of Morven on the Warrego Highway. In the 2021 census, Sommariva had a population of 25 people.

== Geography ==
The Warrego Highway passes through the locality from east to west. The Western Railway line also passes through from east to west to the immediate south of the highway, with four railway stations within the locality (from west to east):

- Arabella railway station (26.4179°S 146.4585°E)
- Sommariva railway station (26.4171°S 146.5988°E)
- Lurnea railway station (now abandoned) (26.4087°S 146.6885°E)
- Angellala railway station (26.4131°S 146.8892°E)

== History ==
The locality takes its name from its railway station, which was named by the Queensland Railways Department on 18 February 1911, using the name of an adjacent pastoral property, which presumably took its name from the town of Sommariva in Piedmont, Italy.

== Demographics ==
In the 2016 census, Sommariva had a population of 14 people.

In the 2021 census, Sommariva had a population of 25 people.

== Heritage listings ==
Sommariva has a number of heritage-listed sites, including the Angellala Rail Bridge on the Roma-Cunnamulla railway line (26.4136°S 146.8863°E).

== Economy ==
Sommariva is operated by Bill and Karen McLennan who grow and produce olives. Sommariva boasts the largest olive grove west of the Great Dividing Range. Sommariva olives, Olive Oil and Olive – derived products are marketed all over Southwest Queensland.

== Education ==
There are no schools in Sommariva. The nearest government primary schools are Charleville State School in neighbouring Charleville to the west and Morven State School in neighbouring Morven to the east. The nearest government secondary school is Charleville State High School in Charleville. Some parts of Sommariva are too distant from these schools for a daily commute; the other options are distance education or boarding school.
