= Redford, Queensland =

Redford
- Suburb
- Interactive map of Redford
- Coordinates: 25.9388°S 147.4258°E
- Country: Australia
- State: Queensland
- LGA: Shire of Murweh
- Location: 70.8 km (44.0 mi) N of Mungallala; 203 km (126 mi) NW of Roma; 205 km (127 mi) NE of Charleville, Queensland; 681 km (423 mi) WNW of Brisbane

Government
  - State electorate: Warrego
  - Federal division: Maranoa

Area
  - Total: 2,523.3 km^{2} (974.3 sq mi)

Population
  - Total: 18 (2021 census)
  - Density: 0.00713/km^{2} (0.0185/sq mi)
- Postcode: 4467
Suburbs around Redford
Caroline Crossing	Womblebank	Forestvale
Clara Creek	Redford	Forestvale
Clara Creek	Morven	Tyrconnel

Redford is a rural locality split between the Maranoa Region and the Shire of Murweh, both in Queensland, Australia. In the 2021 census, Redford had a population of 18 people.

== Geography ==
The Warrego Highway passes to the south and the Landsborough Highway to the west.

== Demographics ==
In the 2016 census, Redford had a population of 7 people.

In the 2021 census, Redford had a population of 18 people.

== Education ==
There are no schools in Redford. The nearest government primary schools are Morven State School in neighbouring Morven to the south and Mungallala State School in Mungallala to the south-east. However, students from the northern part of Redford would be too distant to attend either of these schools. Also, there are no nearby secondary schools. The alternatives are distance education and boarding school.
