= Clara Creek, Queensland =

Clara Creek
- Suburb
- Interactive map of Clara Creek
- Coordinates: 26.0702°S 146.9322°E
- Country: Australia
- State: Queensland
- LGA: Shire of Murweh
- Location: 87.9 km (54.6 mi) NE of Charleville; 218 km (135 mi) WNW of Roma; 617 km (383 mi) WNW of Toowoomba; 696 km (432 mi) WNW of Brisbane

Government
  - State electorate: Warrego
  - Federal division: Maranoa

Area
  - Total: 2,144.4 km^{2} (828.0 sq mi)

Population
  - Total: 56 (2021 census)
  - Density: 0.02611/km^{2} (0.0676/sq mi)
- Time zone: UTC+10:00 (AEST)
- Postcode: 4468
Suburbs around Clara Creek
Augathella	Caroline Crossing	Caroline Crossing
Gowrie Station	Clara Creek	Redford
Sommariva	Morven	Morven

Clara Creek is a locality in the Shire of Murweh, Queensland, Australia. In the 2021 census, Clara Creek had a population of 56 people.

== Geography ==
The Landsborough Highway passes through the locality, entering from south (Morven) and exiting to north-west (Augathella).

The land use is almost entirely grazing on native vegetation.

== History ==
The locality was named and bounded on 28 March 2002.

== Demographics ==
In the 2016 census, Clara Creek had a population of 45 people.

In the 2021 census, Clara Creek had a population of 56 people.

== Education ==
There are no schools in Clara Creek. The nearest government primary schools are Augathella State School in neighbouring Augathella to the north-west and Morven State School in neighbouring Morven to the south.

The nearest government secondary schools are in Charleville and Mitchell, too distant for a daily commute. The alternatives are distance education and boarding school.
