= Gowrie Station =

- Suburb
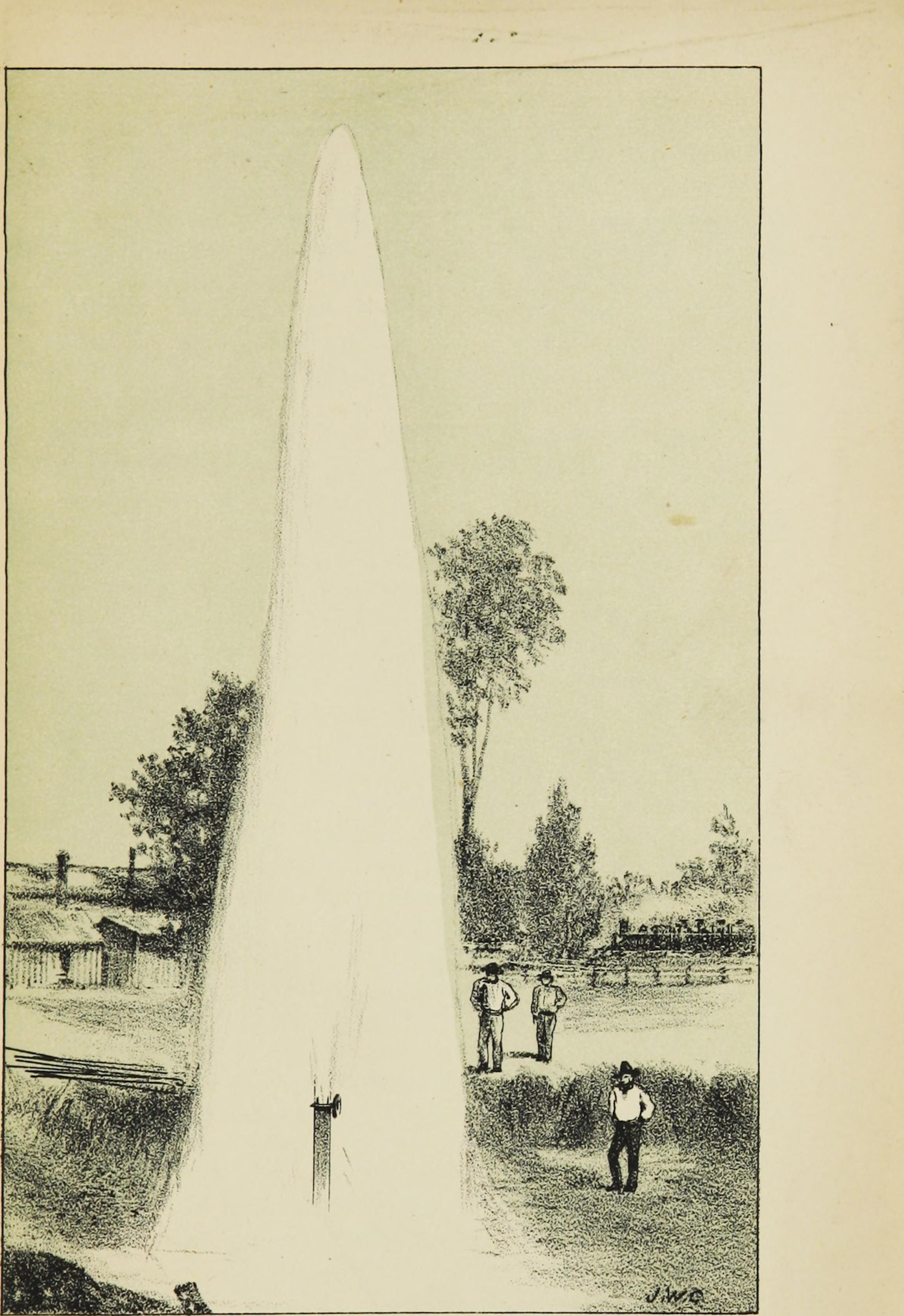
- Artesian bore on Gowrie Station, 1890

- Interactive map of Gowrie Station
- Coordinates: 26.1453°S 146.4281°E
- Country: Australia
- State: Queensland
- LGA: Shire of Murweh
- Location: 22.2 km (13.8 mi) NNW of Charleville; 289 km (180 mi) W of Roma; 640 km (400 mi) WNW of Toowoomba; 770 km (480 mi) WNW of Brisbane

Government
  - State electorate: Warrego
  - Federal division: Maranoa

Area
  - Total: 1,379.9 km^{2} (532.8 sq mi)

Population
  - Total: 11 (2021 census)
  - Density: 0.0080/km^{2} (0.0206/sq mi)
- Time zone: UTC+10:00 (AEST)
- Postcode: 4470
Suburbs around Gowrie Station
Ward	Augathella	Clara Creek
Ward	Gowrie Station	Sommariva
Charleville	Sommariva	Sommariva

Gowrie Station is a rural locality in the Shire of Murweh, Queensland, Australia. In the 2021 census, Gowrie Station had a population of 11 people.

== Geography ==
The Warrego River enters the locality from the north (Augathella). Flowing in a southerly direction, it forms part of the south-west boundary of the locality before exiting to the south-west (Charleville). The Nive River also enters the locality from the north (Augathella) just west of the Warrego River and becomes a tributary of the Warrego River in the north of the locality.

The Mitchell Highway passes through the locality, entering from the north (Augathella) and exiting from the south-west (Charleville).

The predominant land use is grazing on native vegetation.

== Demographics ==
In the 2016 census, Gowrie Station had a population of 15 people.

In the 2021 census, Gowrie Station had a population of 11 people.

== Education ==
There are no schools in Gowrie Station. The nearest government primary schools are Augathella State School in neighbouring Augathella to the north and Charleville State School in neighbouring Charleville to the south-west. The nearest government secondary school is Charleville State High School, also in Charleville. However, students from the north of the locality may be too distant to attend this school; the alternatives are distance education and boarding school.

There is also a Catholic primary school in Charleville.

== Economy ==
There are a number of homesteads in the locality:

- Barradeen (26.0586°S 146.4239°E)
- Gowrie (26.2296°S 146.3168°E)
- North Yarrawonga (26.2178°S 146.5165°E)
- Woolabra (26.1413°S 146.3951°E)
- Yarrawonga (26.2776°S 146.3723°E)
