= Morven, Queensland =

Morven
- Town
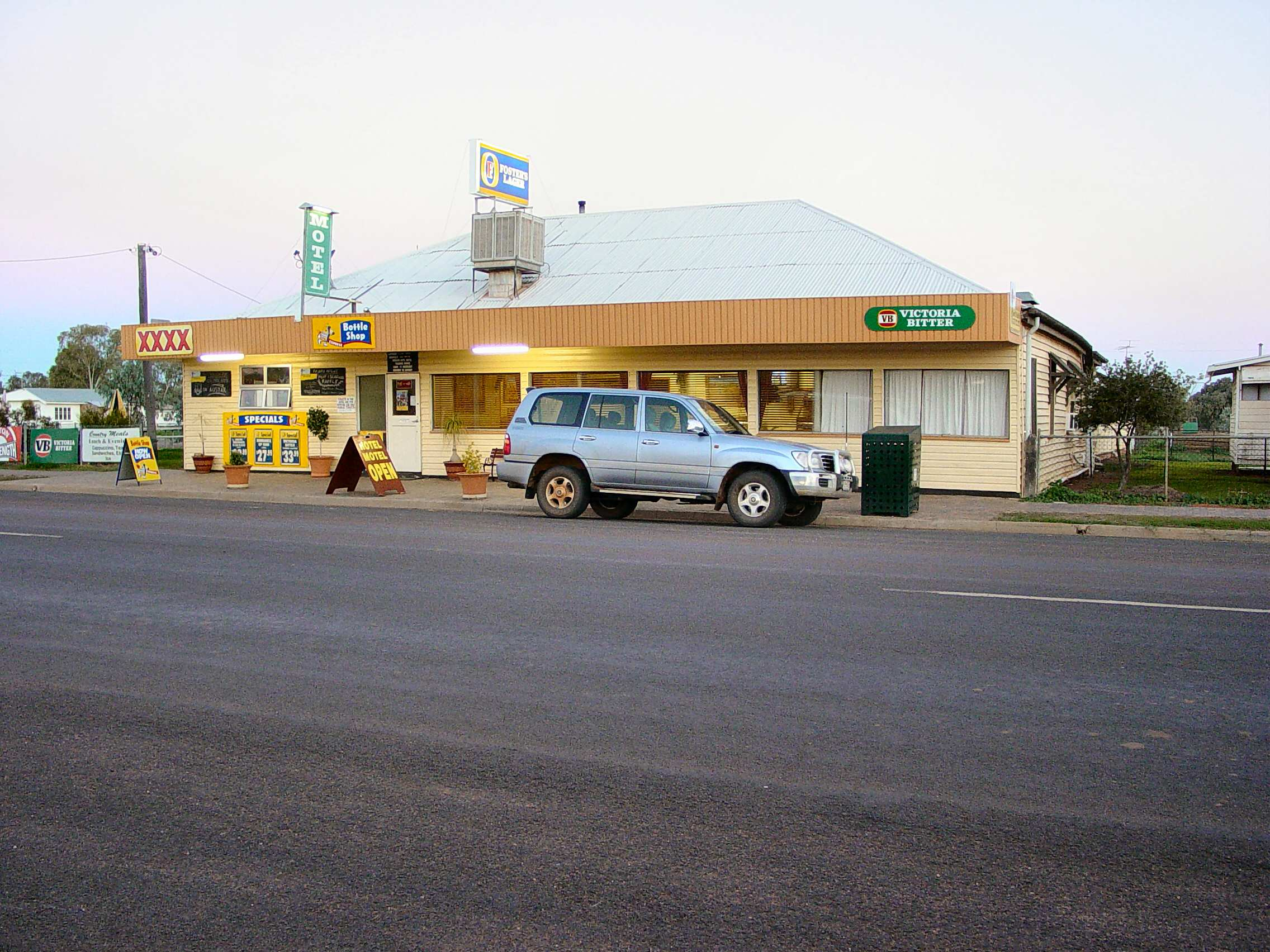
- Morven Hotel (prior to burning down in 2016)

- Interactive map of Morven
- Coordinates: 26.4155°S 147.1127°E
- Country: Australia
- State: Queensland
- LGA: Shire of Murweh
- Location: 90.6 km (56.3 mi) E of Charleville; 177 km (110 mi) W of Roma; 575 km (357 mi) WNW of Toowoomba; 655 km (407 mi) WNW of Brisbane

Government
  - State electorate: Warrego
  - Federal division: Maranoa

Area
  - Total: 2,043.8 km^{2} (789.1 sq mi)

Population
  - Total: 184 (2021 census)
  - Density: 0.09003/km^{2} (0.2332/sq mi)
- Time zone: UTC+10:00 (AEST)
- Postcode: 4468
Localities around Morven
Clara Creek	Redford	Tyrconnel
Sommariva	Morven	Mungallala
Riversleigh	Boatman	Mungallala South

Morven is a rural town and locality in the Shire of Murweh in South West Queensland, Australia. In the 2021 census, the locality of Morven had a population of 184 people.

== Geography ==
The Warrego Highway enters the locality from the east (Mungallala), passes through the town, and then exits to the west (Sommariva). Approximately 3.4 kilometres (2.1 mi) west of the town, the Landsborough Highway commences, splitting off in a north-westerly direction from the Warrego Highway, and exiting the locality to the north-west (Clara Creek).

The Western railway line also enters the locality from the east (Mungallala), passes through the town, which is served by the Morven railway station (26.4146°S 147.1132°E), and then exits to the west (Sommariva).

Tregole National Park (where the Mulga Lands and the Brigalow Belt meet) is to the south and west of the town. Apart from the national park and the town, the land use is grazing on native vegetation.

== History ==
Originally, the area on which Morven now sits was a popular spot for bullock teams on the road between Mitchell and Charleville. In 1859, a small area was taken from the property Victoria Downs and set aside for public use and designated on maps and documents as 'Victoria Downs Reserve'. It was on the Cobb & Co mail route from Brisbane to Charleville. Later it became informally known as 'Sadlier's Waterhole' after Captain TJ Sadlier and his wife camped at the property.

In 1876, a post office was opened and called Morven. When officially surveyed in 1880, it was officially given the name Morven. It is believed to be named after Morven in Aberdeenshire, Scotland.

Morven State School opened on 24 September 1887.

All Souls Anglican Church opened in 1906 and was dedicated in 1926.

On Sunday 14 March 1926, Archbishop James Duhig opened and consecrated the Sacred Heart Roman Catholic church.

On Tuesday 26 April 2016, the Morven Hotel Motel was burned down. It was a big loss to the town as it was the only hotel in the town. It was rebuilt by members of the local community in 2020 and now trades as Sadlier's Waterhole after the original name for the community.

== Demographics ==
In the 2006 census, the locality of Morven had a population of 276 people.

In the 2016 census, the locality of Morven had a population of 199 people.

In the 2021 census, the locality of Morven had a population of 184 people.

== Heritage listings ==
Morven has a number of heritage-listed sites, including:

- Angellala Rail Bridge, 20 kilometres (12 mi) west of Morven on the Roma–Cunnamulla railway line (26.4136°S 146.8863°E)

== Education ==
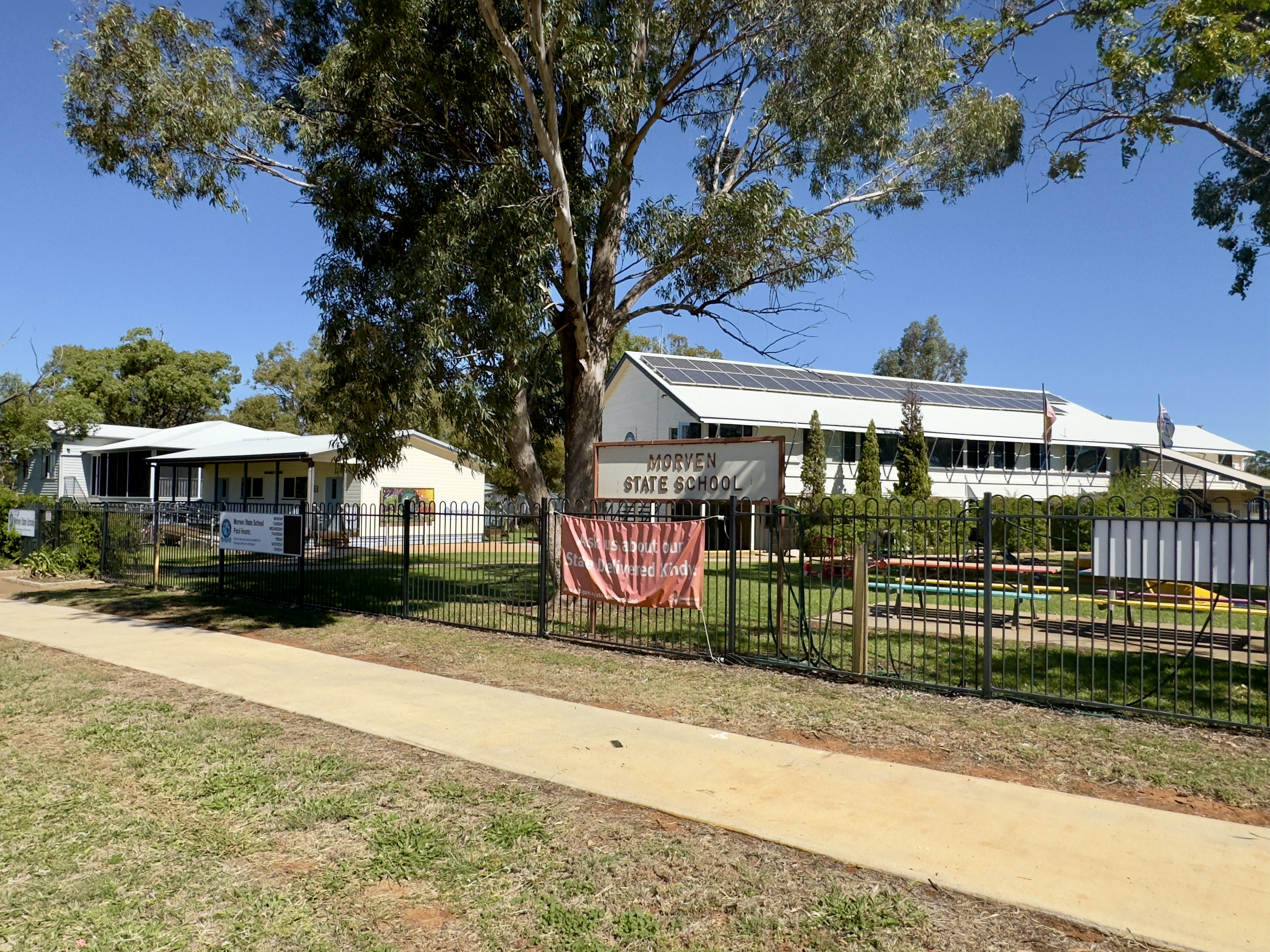
Morven State School, 2024

Morven State School is a government primary (Preparatory to Year 6) school for boys and girls on Albert Street (26.4156°S 147.1098°E). In 2017, the school had an enrolment of 23 students with 3 teachers (2 full-time equivalent) and 5 non-teaching staff (2 full-time equivalent). In 2018, the school had an enrolment of 20 students with 3 teachers (2 full-time equivalent) and 5 non-teaching staff (2 full-time equivalent).

There are no secondary schools in Morven. School Bus Route S280 conveys students from Year 7 to Year 12 to Charleville State High School in Charleville to the west.

== Transport ==
Morven Aerodrome has an unsealed runway of red loam, 1,725 by 45 metres (5,659 ft × 148 ft). It is operated by Murweh Shire Council.

Morven is situated at the junction of the Warrego Highway to Charleville and the Landsborough Highway to Augathella.

Morven is a timetabled stop for the Intercity Bus Services operated by Greyhound Australia:

- Gx493 Brisbane to Mount Isa
- Gx494 Mount Isa to Brisbane
- Gx495 Brisbane to Charleville
- Gx496 Charleville to Brisbane

Morven Railway Station serves the town of Morven. It is used by the twice-weekly Westlander passenger train.

- The Westbound service (3S86) from Brisbane Roma Street to Charleville stops at Morven Wednesdays and Fridays at 9:55 am.
- The Eastbound service (3987) from Charleville to Brisbane Roma Street stops at Morven Wednesdays and Fridays at 7:55 pm.

== Amenities ==
The Murweh Shire Council operates a public library in Morven on the Warrego Highway.

The Morven branch of the Queensland Country Women's Association has its rooms in Roma Street.

All Souls Anglican Church is in Eurella Street (26.4159°S 147.1124°E) and holds services on the 3rd Sunday of every month.

Sacred Heart Catholic Church is in Eurella Street (26.4130°S 147.1121°E). No regular services are held at this church.

The Sadlier's Waterhole Hotel is on the Warrego Highway on the site of the Morven Hotel/Motel (which was destroyed by fire in 2016).

== Facilities ==
- Morven Police Station (26.4170°S 147.1127°E)
- Morven Fire Station (26.4162°S 147.1124°E)
- Morven SES Facility (26.4126°S 147.1113°E)
- Morven Community Health Clinic (26.4147°S 147.1080°E)
- Morven Ambulance Station (26.4147°S 147.1076°E)
- Morven Cemetery (26.4111°S 147.1097°E)

== Attractions ==
Morven Historical Museum is at 53 Albert Street (26.4154°S 147.1115°E).

== Media ==
the Australian Broadcasting Corporation and its sister channels ABC Kids/ABC Family, ABC Entertains and ABC News transmits to Morven through its relay station, ABMNQ, situated at 26°30′20″S 147°8′4″E (Morven–Nebine Road) and it also transmits ABC Radio National to Morven on 107.5 FM.

Radio 4VL (part of the Resonate Radio Network) transmits to Morven on 105.9 FM.

The Seven Network and its sister channels, 7two and 7mate transmit to Morven through its regional area affiliate, ITQ.

The Nine Network and its sister channels 9Gem and 9Go! transmit to Morven through its regional area affiliate, Imparja.

Network 10 and its sister channels 10 Drama and 10 Comedy transmit to Morven through its regional area affiliate, CDT.

The Special Broadcasting Service and its sister channels SBS2, SBS World Movies and SBS Food also transmit to Morven.
