= Mungallala =

- Town
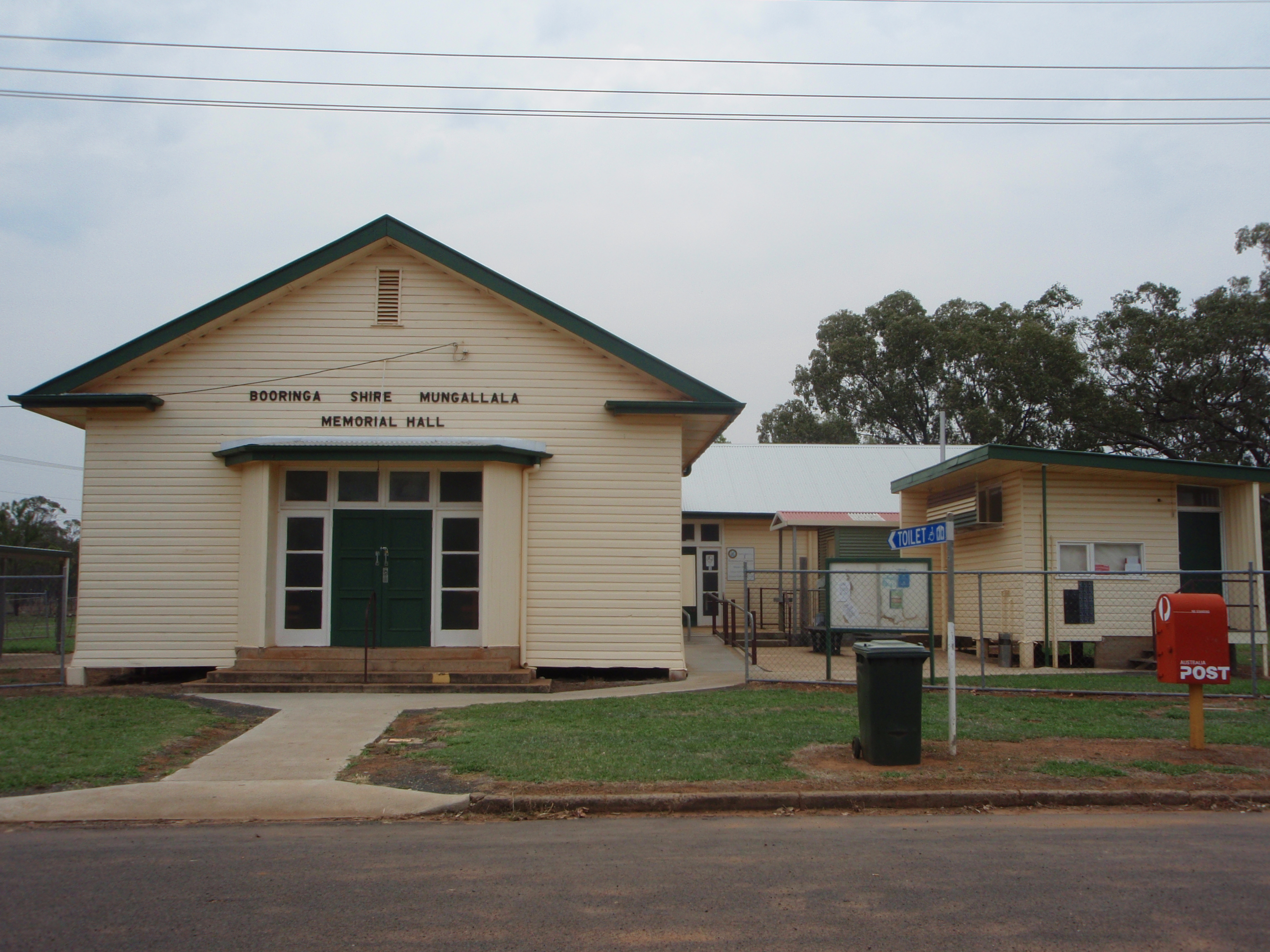
- Mungallala Memorial Hall

- Interactive map of Mungallala
- Coordinates: 26.4466°S 147.5438°E
- Country: Australia
- State: Queensland
- LGA: Maranoa Region
- Location: 45.0 km (28.0 mi) W of Mitchell; 132 km (82 mi) W of Roma; 135 km (84 mi) E of Charleville; 675 km (419 mi) WNW of Brisbane

Government
  - State electorate: Warrego
  - Federal division: Maranoa

Area
  - Total: 451.3 km^{2} (174.2 sq mi)

Population
  - Total: 85 (2021 census)
  - Density: 0.1883/km^{2} (0.4878/sq mi)
- Time zone: UTC+10:00 (AEST)
- Postcode: 4467
- County: Mungallala County
Localities around Mungallala
Tyrconnel	Tyrconnel	Tyrconnel
Morven	Mungallala	Womalilla
Mungallala South	Mungallala South	Mungallala South

Mungallala is a rural town and locality in the Maranoa Region, Queensland, Australia. In the 2021 census, the locality of Mungallala had a population of 85 people.

== Geography ==
The town is in South West Queensland, 608 kilometres (378 mi) west of the state capital Brisbane,133 kilometres (83 mi) west of the regional centre of Roma, 45 kilometres (28 mi) west of Mitchell and 135 kilometres (84 mi) east of Charleville.

The Warrego Highway passes from east (Womalilla) to west (Morven) through the locality, passing through the town which is in the eastern part of the locality. The Western railway line also passes from east to west through the locality, roughly parallel and to the south of the highway. The town is served by the Mungallala railway station, 1 kilometre (0.62 mi) south-west of the town (26.4553°S 147.5386°E).

The former locality of Dulvadilla/Dulbydilla is within the locality of Mungallala. Dulbydilla railway siding remains on the western railway line in the west of the locality at 26.4350°S 147.3744°E.

The town consists of only a few streets.

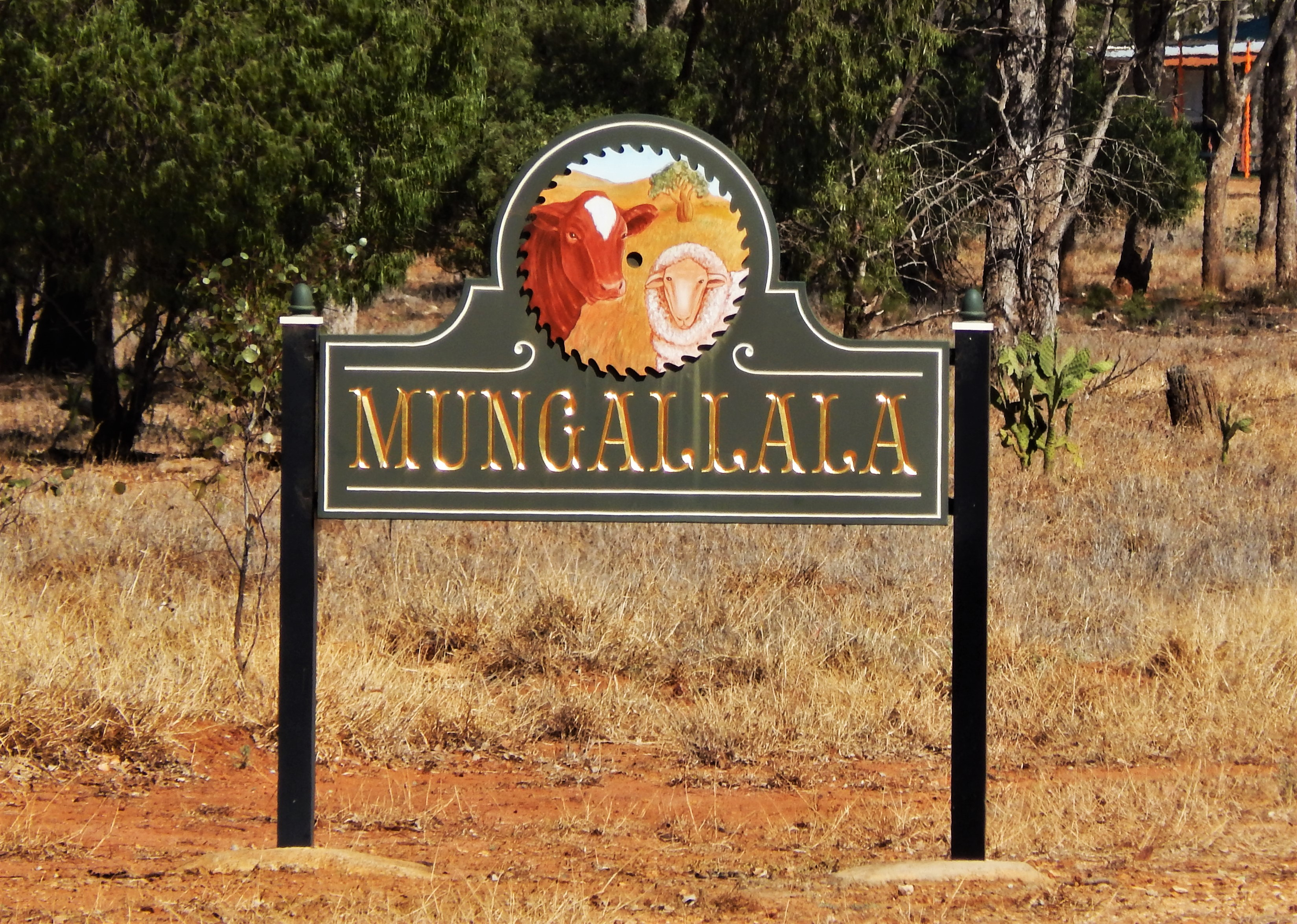
Sign on the Warrego Highway at the eastern entrance to Mungallala

== History ==
The name Mungallala derives from a pastoral run and comes from the Kunggari language with from mungar / kungar meaning bird and yaya / lala meaning shout, implying the sound made by the claws of running emus. The name Dulbydilla derives from the Aboriginal words, dulby meaning black and dilla meaning waterhole, referring to the discolouration of the water caused by eucalypt leaves.

The town was on the Cobb & Co stagecoach route from Roma to Charleville; The coach traveled the 283 kilometres (176 mi) twice weekly, and they staged at Womalilla Downs, Burenda Downs and Dulbydilla. Mungallala may also have been a "changing station". The coach drivers included Austin Brumfield, J. Coyle, Tom Merritt, Jim Burstall, Bob Martin and Luke O'Malley. The route was mail service number 15 (Mitchell-Roma) and 16 (Mitchell -Charleville), and ran bi-weekly to 1881, thrice-weekly. In August 1886, the Number 16 route was shortened to Dulbydilla. From March 1887, the coach began at Morven. On 29 February 1888, the Western railway line reached Charleville, seeing the end of the Cobb & Co mail runs through Mungallala.

Dulbydilla Post Office operated from 1886 to 1887, after which a receiving office operated from 1887 to 1924. A telephone office operated from 1953 to 1956.

Mungallala Post Office opened by May 1911 (a receiving office had been open from 1887).

Mungallala Provisional School opened on 5 September 1904. It became Mungallala State School on 1 January 1909.

St John's Anglican church was dedicated on 18 September 1914 by the Venerable Arthur Rivers. It was a timber church able to seat 50 people located south of the railway station (approx. 26.4566°S 147.5395°E). In 1962, it was relocated to Charleville Street in the town centre (26.44537°S 147.54352°E). The church's closure on 5 April 2006 was approved by Archdeacon of The West, G.F. Harch.

Sacred Heart Catholic Church was officially opened and blessed by Archbishop James Duhig on Sunday 8 July 1923. It has since been demolished.

Mungallala Methodist Church was built in 1964. It has now closed.

In 2016, the Australian Taxation Office listed Mungallala as having the lowest mean taxable income by postcode, making it the poorest town in Australia, which led the ABC to do a documentary on the town for their online "storyhunters" program.

In the 2016 census, the locality of Mungallala had a population of 136 people.

In the 2021 census, the locality of Mungallala had a population of 85 people.

== Education ==
Mungallala State School is a government primary (Prep–6) school for boys and girls at 24 Redford Street (26.4446°S 147.5450°E). In 2017, the school had an enrolment of 6 students with 2 teachers (1 full-time equivalent) and 4 non-teaching staff (2 full-time equivalent). In 2018, the school had an enrolment of 8 students with 3 teachers (1 full-time equivalent) and 4 non-teaching staff (2 full-time equivalent).

There is no secondary school in Mungallala; the nearest government secondary school is Mitchell State School in Mitchell which provides schooling to Year 10. For education to Year 12, the nearest government secondary schools are Roma State College in Roma and Charleville State High School in Charleville.

== Facilities ==
The Maranoa Regional Council operates a public library in Mungallala in Redford Street

There are 2 free caravan parks in town, and a recreation centre where several events are held each year for local residents and visitors. There are 2 tennis courts and a 4-hole golf course, constantly being mowed by a group of eastern grey kangaroos.

There is a pub and cafe, where internet connectivity (powered through the National Broadband Network) is available. The cafe is also a wildlife care centre.

Other facilities in the town include:

- Mungallala Police Station (26.4437°S 147.5439°E)
- Mungallala Fire Station (26.4469°S 147.5447°E)
- Mungallala Monumental Cemetery (26.4588°S 147.5445°E)

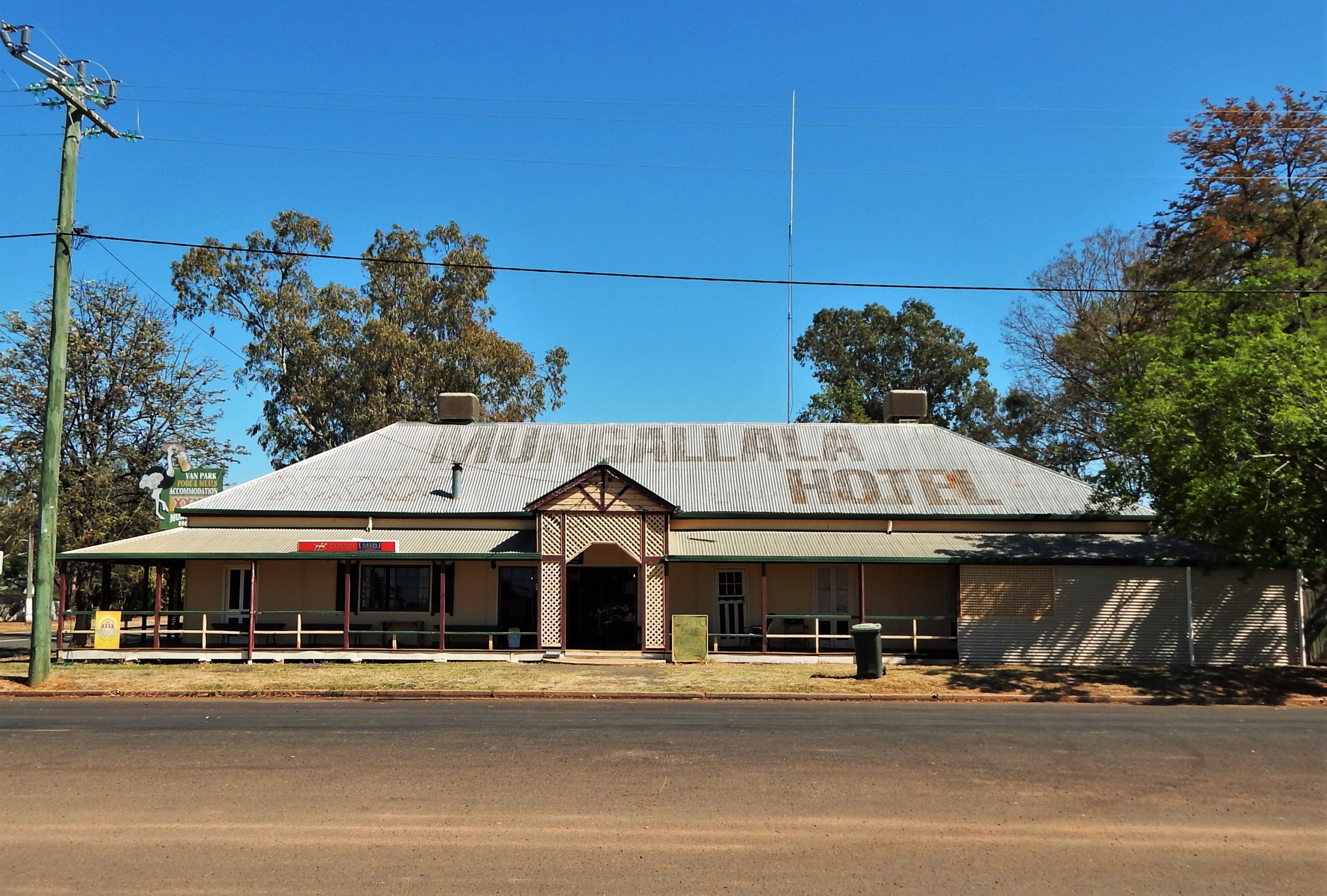
Mungallala Hotel
