= Barringun, Queensland =

Barringun
- Suburb
- Interactive map of Barringun
- Coordinates: 28.8613°S 145.7922°E
- Country: Australia
- State: Queensland
- LGA: Shire of Paroo
- Location: 307 km (191 mi) S of Charleville; 107 km (66 mi) S of Cunnamulla; 154 km (96 mi) N of Bourke; 902 km (560 mi) WSW of Brisbane

Government
  - State electorate: Warrego
  - Federal division: Maranoa

Area
  - Total: 932.8 km^{2} (360.2 sq mi)

Population
  - Total: 17 (2021 census)
  - Density: 0.0182/km^{2} (0.0472/sq mi)
- Time zone: UTC+10:00 (AEST)
- Postcode: 4490
Suburbs around Barringun
Cuttaburra	Tuen	Noorama
Cuttaburra	Barringun	Noorama
Enngonia (NSW)	Barringun (NSW)	Enngonia (NSW)

Barringun is a rural locality in the Shire of Paroo, Queensland, Australia. It is on the border of Queensland and New South Wales. In the 2021 census, Barringun had a population of 17 people.

The former border town of Wooroorooka is within the south-west of the locality (28.9667°S 145.7000°E).

== Geography ==
Barringun is bounded to the west by the Warrego River and to the south by the border with New South Wales. The Zero Obelisk marks the first official survey of the border between what were then the separate colonies of New South Wales and Queensland when an accurate definition of the border was important for legal and economic reasons. It illustrates a remarkable feat of surveying in the nineteenth century and is a reminder of the extraordinarily difficult conditions under which many early surveyors worked.

Barringun Road enters the locality from the north (Tuen) and exits to the south (Barringun, New South Wales). It is part of the Mitchell Highway that connects Cunnamulla, Queensland to Bourke, New South Wales.

The principal land use is grazing on native vegetation.

Binya National Park is to the immediate west of the locality in Cuttaburra.

Barringun is also the capital of the self-proclaimed Murrawarri Republic.

Wooroorooka is located immediately north of the border with New South Wales and is on the Owangowan Creek; it is now abandoned.

== History ==
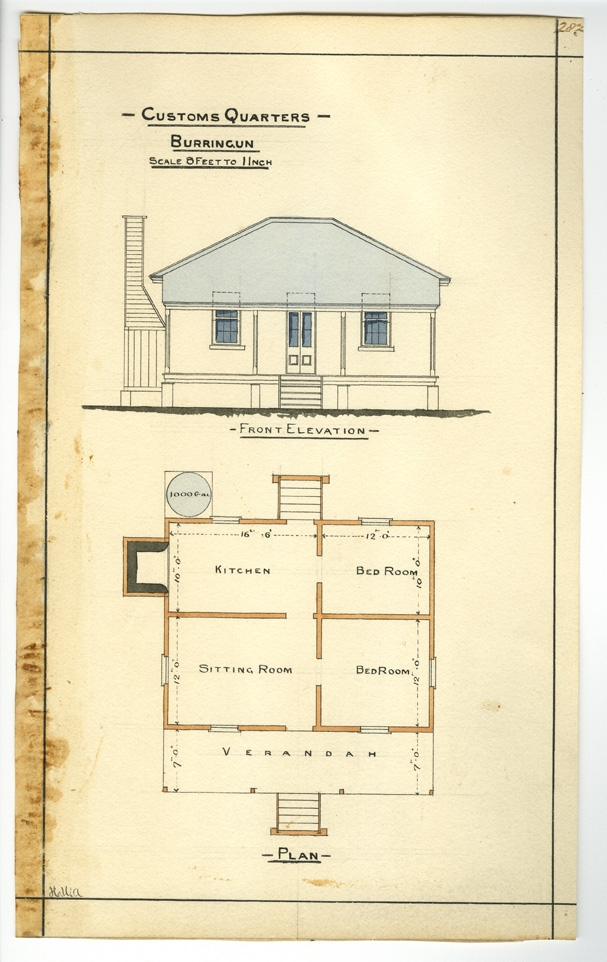
Architectural drawings of the Barringun Customs Quarters, 1885

The name Barringun is derived from the local Aboriginal word for the lower part of the Warrego River variously transcribed as Barronga, Burringun or Barrongun. The 1859 exploration of the river from its junction with the Darling River by Matthew De Rinzy showed that Aboriginal people lived at all the waterholes along the lower reaches of this river. They were also combative to the European incursion, with De Rinzy being wounded by a spear during one of the skirmishes on his journey.

An early British settlement (possibly a pastoral station) on the Warrego River was named Barringun, which can be seen on an 1887 map as being just south of the New South Wales border. Barringun is also possibly an Aboriginal word meaning fish die in the water.

The name Wooroorooka appears to have come from a pastoral run which was owned by Mr Dangar in 1865 but was purchased in 1866 by James Tyson, who also purchased other runs in the area: Rottenrow, Gordonsheet and Teckulman.

In June 1884, the Queensland Government sold approximately 100 town lots in Wooroorooka.

In 1885, discussions were being held between the New South Wales and Queensland colonial parliaments about a rabbit-proof fence to prevent the spread of the pest.

From 1885 when the railway was constructed to Bourke in New South Wales, farmers in south-western Queensland began to send their wool to markets via Bourke rather than the Charleville, then the terminus of the Western railway line in Queensland, as the New South Wales Government offered more competitive rail freight rates than the Queensland Government. Queensland Railway Commissioner James Thallon responded by negotiating with the Carrier's Union which carried goods to the Charleville railhead to make the cost of transporting the goods via Charleville more attractive. However, strikes by the carriers in support of the 1891 Australian shearers' strike meant that goods continued to be travel via New South Wales, further encouraged by new lower freight rates in New South Wales announced in June 1893. The Queensland Government responded the following month by introducing the Railway Border Tax Act which taxed wool and sheepskins crossing the border into New South Wales to make it too expensive to freight the wool via New South Wales. However, this could only be a temporary measure as the anticipated Federation of Australia was expected to introduce free trade between the states of Australia removing the ability to tax goods at the border crossing. Therefore, on 3 December 1895, the Queensland Parliament approved the construction of the 121-mile (195 km) extension of the Western railway line from Charleville to Cunnamulla. It was opened on 10 October 1898.

A magistrate court operated in Wooroorooka from 12 June 1891 to 11 May 1944.

Until the Federation of Australia in January 1901, Wooroorooka served as the Colony of Queensland border customs office, and across the border, Barringun was the Colony of New South Wales border customs office. At this time, Wooroorooka had one customs officer, three police officers, a school teacher, and a post master. The Wooroorooka customs house, a cottage raised up on stumps, became the Border fence ranger's residence.

Wooroorooka had a police station. Barringun existed to support the surrounding pastoral property needs, and the shearing season provided important employment. The local creek was able to support the town even during periods of low rainfall. Recreational activities including fishing on the Maranoa River and cricket with the nearby Belalie Station.

The 1930s continued the town's interest in sports including horse races.

A rail line from Bourke to Barringun was proposed in the late 1920s to the 1940s, to eventually connect with Cunnamulla for freight. The Queensland Government opposed the New South Wales initiative as it would draw trade (and state revenue) away from the south-west Queensland area.

The road to the New South Wales border from Cunnamulla was sealed in bitumen by 1952. The road was considered part of the 'death knell' to the rail line proposal. The Barringun–Bourke section of the Mitchell Highway was expected to be bitumen sealed by 1971.

Some properties in the area included Rostella, Winrae, Tinnenburra, Thurulgoona, Owengowan, and Amenda.

During 2020 and 2021, the Queensland border was closed due to the COVID-19 pandemic. Some border crossing points had Queensland Police checkpoints to confirm eligibility to enter Queensland, while other border crossing points were closed. At Barringun, there was a police border checkpoint on the Mitchell Highway.

== Demographics ==
In the 2016 census, Barringun had a population of 7 people.

In the 2021 census, Barringun had a population of 17 people.

== Heritage listing ==
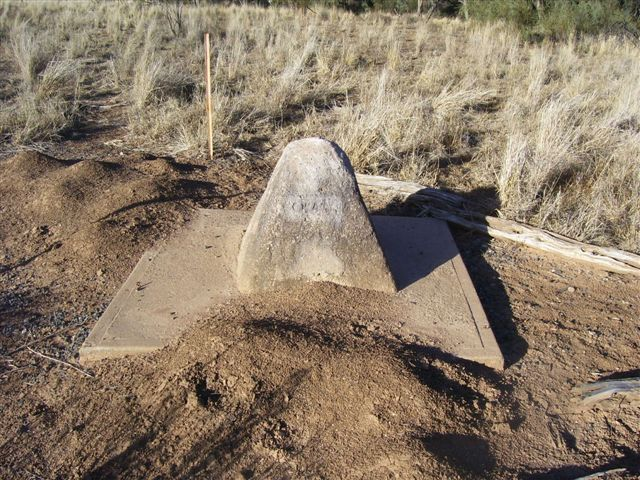
Zero Obelisk

Barringun has a heritage-listed site on the east bank of the Warrego River at the border with New South Wales. The Zero Obelisk marks the beginning of the first official survey of the border between the two colonies.

== Education ==
There are no schools in Barringun. The nearest primary and secondary schools are in Cunnamulla, approximately 107 kilometres (66 mi) away. Distance education and boarding schools are the alternatives.

== Writings ==
The former town was the subject of a 1917 eight-verse poem of the same name by Scottish-Australian poet and bush balladeer Will H. Ogilvie (1869–1963).

The sandhills north of Barringun stand shimmering in the heat,
The dust is driven dense and dun by forty thousand feet,
And dimly through the clouds that cling, beyond the Border Gate,
The kelpies swing along the wing to keep the leaders straight.

And I remember Barringun of thirty years ago
A few tin roofs that took the sun as white as driven snow;
Two bush hotels where loafers sat, a butcher's shop, a store,
A few goats feeding on the flat – and very little more!

Working on the Belalie property, to the south near Enngonia, in the early 1890s Ogilvie was familiar with the New South Wales–Queensland border area.

The poem Comrades, from his anthology The Australian, and other verses (1916), also made reference to Barringun:

Do the shearers still go riding up the Warrego to work.
Where the Thurulgoona woolshed flashes silver in the sun?
Are the bullock-teams still bending through the cooiibahs to Bourke?
Is there racing at Enngonia? Is Belalie still a run?
Do the Diamantina cattle still come down by Barringun?

Ogilvie also wrote a short story about the mail run to the town entitled His Majesty's mail (1922).
