= Noorama, Queensland =

Noorama
- Suburb
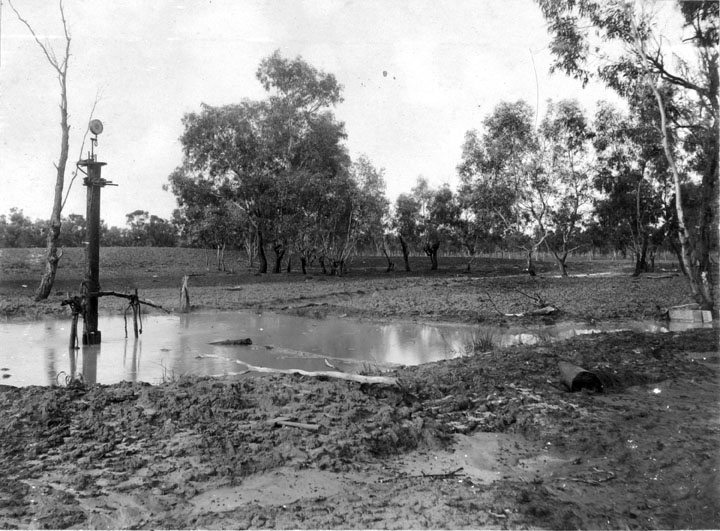
- Noorama Bore No 1, circa 1910

- Interactive map of Noorama
- Coordinates: 28.7233°S 146.2080°E
- Country: Australia
- State: Queensland
- LGA: Shire of Paroo
- Location: 106 km (66 mi) SE of Cunnamulla; 302 km (188 mi) S of Charleville, Queensland; 474 km (295 mi) SW of Roma; 659 km (409 mi) WSW of Toowoomba; 788 km (490 mi) WSW of Brisbane

Government
  - State electorate: Warrego
  - Federal division: Maranoa

Area
  - Total: 3,626.2 km^{2} (1,400.1 sq mi)

Population
  - Total: 15 (2021 census)
  - Density: 0.00414/km^{2} (0.0107/sq mi)
- Time zone: UTC+10:00 (AEST)
- Postcode: 4490
Suburbs around Noorama
Tuen	Widgeegoara	Widgeegoara
Barringun	Noorama	Jobs Gate
Enngonia (NSW)	Enngonia (NSW)	Enngonia (NSW)

Noorama is a rural locality in the Shire of Paroo, Queensland, Australia. It in on the border of Queensland and New South Wales. In the 2021 census, Noorama had a population of 15 people.

== Geography ==
The locality is bounded to the south by the border of Queensland and New South Wales. Noorama Creek and Widgeegoara Creek flow from the north of the locality (Widgeegoara) through to the south of the locality (Enngonia, New South Wales). These creeks are distributaries of the Warrego River.

Jobs Gate Road traverses the locality from Jobs Gate in the east through to Widgeegoara in the north.

The predominant land use is grazing of cattle and sheep.

== History ==
Pastoralists moved into the Noorama district from the 1860s to the 1880s. The locality presumably takes its name from the Noorama pastoral station which was established in 1879 by the North British Australian Company. By 1900 the property was approximately 95,000 hectares (230,000 acres; 370 sq mi) with over 40,000 sheep and 240 cattle. Subsequently the property was reduced in size due to closer settlement policies of the Queensland Government, but was expanded from 2005 onwards to create a property over 5 sites of 105,000 hectares (260,000 acres; 410 sq mi) by 2017.

In 1950s a number of recreational groups were established, including a cricket club, a tennis club and an annual gymkhana was held.

The Noorama Picnic Race Club was established in 1964, holding its first race meeting on 14 May 1966.

== Demographics ==
In the 2016 census, Noorama had a population of 21 people.

In the 2021 census, Noorama had a population of 15 people.

== Amenities ==
Noorama racecourse is on Jobs Creek Road (28.6868°S 146.2220°E).

== Education ==
There are no schools in Noorama. The nearest primary and secondary schools are in Cunnamulla, approximately 106 kilometres (66 mi) away. Distance education and boarding schools are the alternatives.

== Events ==
The annual Noorama Picnic Races held in April attracts both local people and tourists.
