= Bindebango, Queensland =

Bindebango
- Suburb
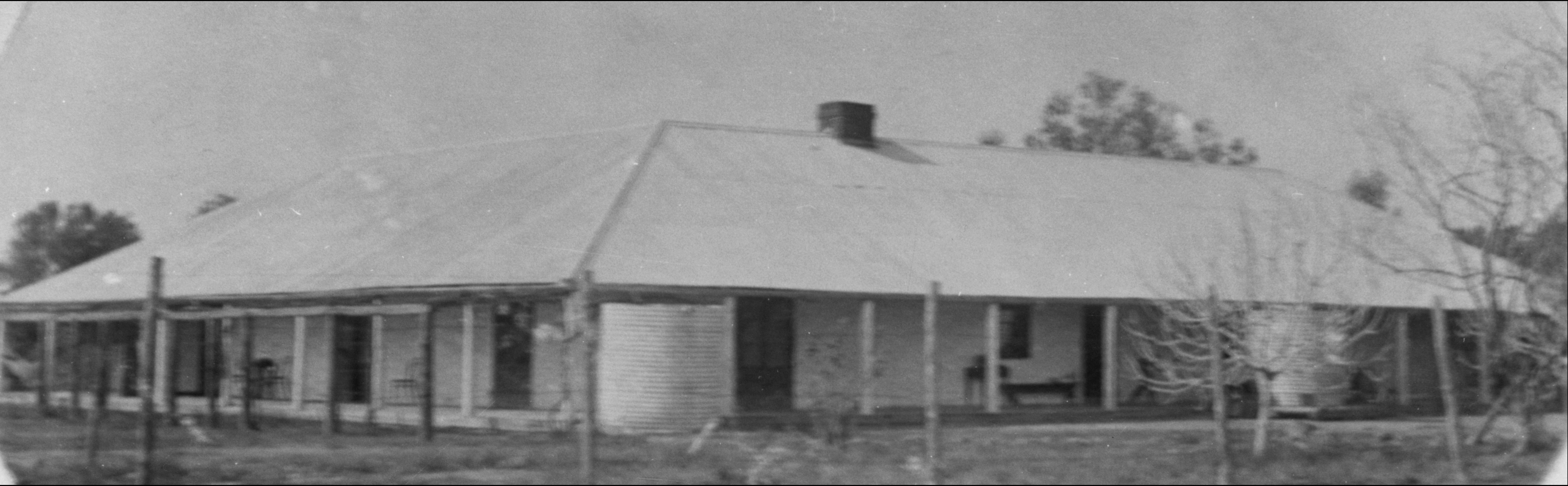
- Homestead on Bindebango Station, circa 1910

- Interactive map of Bindebango
- Coordinates: 27.6394°S 147.3880°E
- Country: Australia
- State: Queensland
- LGA: Maranoa Region
- Location: 50.7 km (31.5 mi) N of Bollon; 164 km (102 mi) WNW of St George; 219 km (136 mi) SW of Roma; 532 km (331 mi) W of Toowoomba; 661 km (411 mi) W of Brisbane

Government
  - State electorate: Warrego
  - Federal division: Maranoa

Area
  - Total: 3,039.5 km^{2} (1,173.6 sq mi)

Population
  - Total: 31 (2021 census)
  - Density: 0.01020/km^{2} (0.0264/sq mi)
- Time zone: UTC+10:00 (AEST)
- Postcode: 4488
Suburbs around Bindebango
| Boatman | Bargunyah | Dunkeld |
| Nebine | Bindebango | Begonia |
| Nebine | Bollon | St George |

Bindebango is a rural locality in the Maranoa Region, Queensland, Australia. In the 2021 census, Bindebango had a population of 31 people.

== Geography ==
Thrushton National Park is in the south-east of the locality, extending into neighbouring Bollon to the south. Apart from this protected area, the land use is grazing on native vegetation.

The Balonne Highway passes to the south of the locality through Bollon.

== Demographics ==
In the 2016 census, Bindebango had a population of 10 people.

In the 2021 census, Bindebango had a population of 31 people.

== Education ==
There are no schools in Bindebango. The nearest government primary school is Bollon State School in neighbouring Bollon to the south, but only students within the south of Bindebango are likely to be close enough for a daily commute. There are no nearby secondary schools. The alternatives are distance education and boarding school.
