= Nebine, Queensland =

Nebine
- Suburb
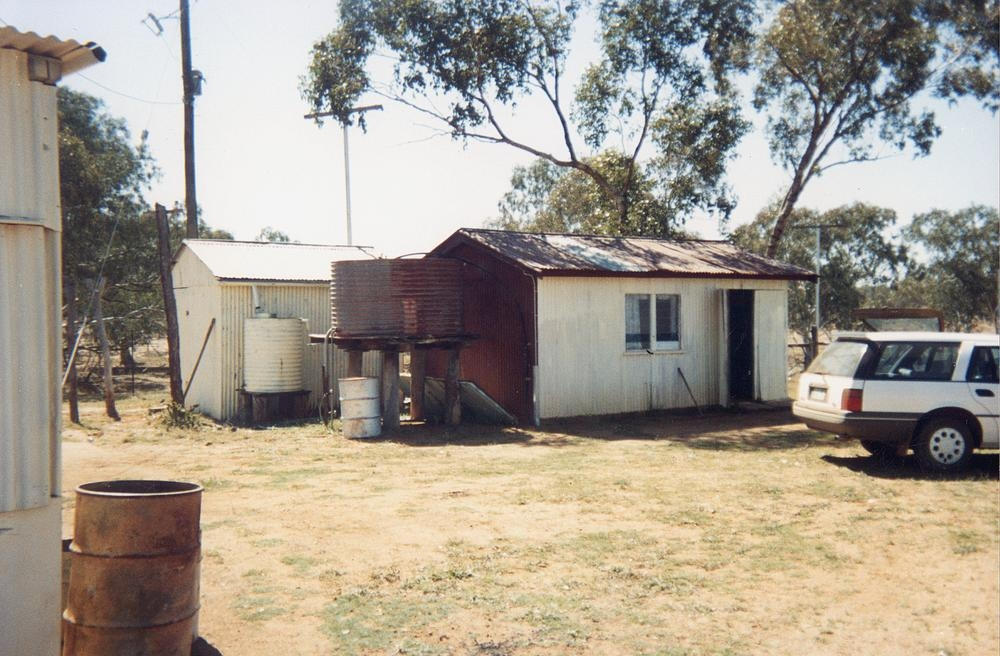
- Nebine Library, 1990

- Interactive map of Nebine
- Coordinates: 28.0645°S 146.8142°E
- Country: Australia
- State: Queensland
- LGA: Shire of Paroo
- Location: 65.4 km (40.6 mi) W of Bollon; 114 km (71 mi) E of Cunnamulla; 179 km (111 mi) W of St George; 564 km (350 mi) W of Toowoomba; 678 km (421 mi) W of Brisbane

Government
  - State electorate: Warrego
  - Federal division: Maranoa

Area
  - Total: 4,571.1 km^{2} (1,764.9 sq mi)

Population
  - Total: 29 (2021 census)
  - Density: 0.00634/km^{2} (0.01643/sq mi)
- Time zone: UTC+10:00 (AEST)
- Postcode: 4488
Suburbs around Nebine
Wyandra	Boatman	Bindebango
Linden	Nebine	Bollon
Widgeegoara	Jobs Gate	Bollon

Nebine is a rural locality in the Shire of Paroo, Queensland, Australia. In the 2021 census, Nebine had a population of 29 people.

== Geography ==
Nebine Creek enters the locality from the north (Boatman) and flows south through the locality, exiting to the south (Jobs Gate).

Nebine has the following mountains:

- Mount Lookout (also called Mount Annie, 27.9683°S 146.9294°E), rising to 240 metres (790 ft) above sea level
- Mount Vernon (27.9666°S 146.9666°E), rising to 190 metres (620 ft)

The Balonne Highway enters the locality from the east (Bollon), passes through the centre of the locality, and exits to west (Linden). There is a junction with the Bollon Charleville Road which exits the locality to the north (Boatman).

The land use is predominantly grazing on native vegetation.

== History ==
The Nebine Community Centre opened circa 1953.

== Demographics ==
In the 2016 census, Nebine had a population of 19 people.

In the 2021 census, Nebine had a population of 29 people.

== Education ==
There are no schools in Nebine. The nearest government primary school is Bollon State School in neighbouring Bollon to the east; however, most students in Nebine would be too distant for a daily commute. There are no nearby secondary schools. The alternatives are distance education and boarding school.

== Amenities ==
Despite the name, the Nebine Community Centre is on Nebine Community Centre Road in neighbouring Boatman to the north. Run by a community group, it has three tennis courts, a cricket pitch, a library and a playground.
