= Tego =

Tego may refer to:

- Tego (toego), Bhutanese clothing
- Tego film, an adhesive sheet used in the manufacture of waterproof plywood
- Tego Calderón, Puerto Rican rapper and actor
- Tego, Queensland, a town in the Shire of Paroo, Australia
