= Boatman, Queensland =

Boatman
- Suburb
- Interactive map of Boatman
- Coordinates: 27.1134°S 146.8461°E
- Country: Australia
- State: Queensland
- LGA: Shire of Murweh
- Location: 178 km (111 mi) S of Morven; 201 km (125 mi) SW of Mitchell; 203 km (126 mi) SE of Charleville; 727 km (452 mi) W of Brisbane

Government
  - State electorate: Warrego
  - Federal division: Maranoa

Area
  - Total: 3,886.6 km^{2} (1,500.6 sq mi)

Population
  - Total: 18 (2021 census)
  - Density: 0.00463/km^{2} (0.0120/sq mi)
- Time zone: UTC+10:00 (AEST)
- Postcode: 4468
Suburbs around Boatman
Riversleigh	Morven	Mungallala South
Riversleigh	Boatman	Bargunyah
Wyandra	Nebine	Bindebango

Boatman is a rural locality in the Shire of Murweh, Queensland, Australia. In the 2021 census, Boatman had a population of 18 people.

== Geography ==
The Warrego Highway passes to the north, the Mitchell Highway to the west, and the Balonne Highway to the south.

The land use is grazing on native vegetation and there are numerous homesteads in the area:

- Aqua Downs (27.1483°S 146.9581°E)
- Bilbie Park (26.8774°S 146.8579°E)
- Boatman (27.2606°S 146.9145°E)
- Coniston (27.3510°S 146.7623°E)
- Coolamon (26.9070°S 147.0872°E)
- Dingwall (27.4630°S 146.8517°E)
- Dundee (27.3241°S 147.0124°E)
- Gunnawarra (27.1311°S 147.0298°E)
- Kalanoa (26.9672°S 146.6654°E)
- Kanalba (26.7391°S 146.9414°E)
- Lowood (26.7491°S 146.8562°E)
- Mervyndale (27.3430°S 146.7424°E)
- Nooraloo (26.8219°S 146.8998°E)
- Sherwood (26.9765°S 146.8283°E)
- Ularunda (26.7876°S 147.0523°E)
- Urana (26.9190°S 147.1297°E)
- Wongamere (27.4667°S 146.9059°E)

== History ==
The Nebine Community Centre opened circa 1953.

== Demographics ==
In the 2016 census, Boatman had a population of 6 people.

In the 2021 census, Boatman had a population of 18 people.

== Education ==
There are no schools in Boatman. The nearest government primary school is Morven State School in neighbouring Morven to the north. However, it would be too distant for students in the centre and south of Morven to attend. Also, there are no nearby secondary schools. The alternatives are distance education and boarding school.

== Amenities ==
Despite the name, the Nebine Community Centre is on Nebine Community Centre Road in Boatman (27.2682°S 146.9275°E). Run by a community group, it has three tennis courts, a cricket pitch, a library and a playground.
