= Bargunyah, Queensland =

Bargunyah
- Suburb
- Interactive map of Bargunyah
- Coordinates: 27.2422°S 147.4261°E
- Country: Australia
- State: Queensland
- LGA: Maranoa Region
- Location: 83 km (52 mi) W of Dunkeld; 195 km (121 mi) WSW of Roma; 546 km (339 mi) WNW of Toowoomba; 673 km (418 mi) WNW of Brisbane

Government
  - State electorate: Warrego
  - Federal division: Maranoa

Area
  - Total: 3,541.8 km^{2} (1,367.5 sq mi)

Population
  - Total: 35 (2021 census)
  - Density: 0.00988/km^{2} (0.0256/sq mi)
- Time zone: UTC+10:00 (AEST)
- Postcode: 4465
Suburbs around Bargunyah
Boatman	Mungallala South	V Gate
Boatman	Bargunyah	Dunkeld
Boatman	Bindebango	Bindebango

Bargunyah is a rural locality in the Maranoa Region, Queensland, Australia. In the 2021 census, Bargunyah had a population of 35 people.

== Geography ==
Bargunyah's postcode is 4465.

The land use is grazing on native vegetation.

== Demographics ==
In the 2016 census, Bargunyah had a population of 29 people.

In the 2021 census, Bargunyah had a population of 35 people.

== Education ==
There are no schools in Bargunyah. The nearest government primary school is Dunkeld State School in neighbouring Dunkeld to the east; however, it would be too distant for a daily commute from most parts of Bargunyah. Also, there are no nearby secondary schools. The alternatives are distance education and boarding school.
