= Dunkeld, Queensland =

Dunkeld
- Suburb
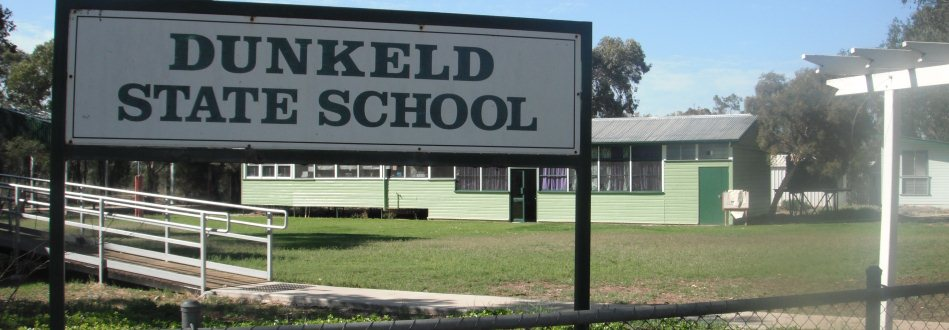
- Dunkeld State School

- Interactive map of Dunkeld
- Coordinates: 27.1213°S 148.0541°E
- Country: Australia
- State: Queensland
- LGA: Maranoa Region
- Location: 79.6 km (49.5 mi) S of Mitchell; 122 km (76 mi) SW of Roma; 448 km (278 mi) WNW of Toowoomba; 576 km (358 mi) WNW of Brisbane

Government
  - State electorate: Warrego
  - Federal division: Maranoa

Area
  - Total: 2,674.9 km^{2} (1,032.8 sq mi)

Population
  - Total: 49 (2021 census)
  - Density: 0.01832/km^{2} (0.0474/sq mi)
- Time zone: UTC+10:00 (AEST)
- Postcode: 4465
Suburbs around Dunkeld
V Gate	Eurella	Mount Abundance
Bargunyah	Dunkeld	Ballaroo
Bindebango	Bindebango	Begonia

Dunkeld is a rural locality in the Maranoa Region, Queensland, Australia. In the 2021 census, Dunkeld had a population of 49 people.

== Geography ==
The Maranoa River flows from north to south through the locality.

The land use is almost entirely grazing on native vegetation.

== History ==
The name Dunkeld derives from a pastoral run name given in 1863 by pastoralists Edward Flood and Samuel Deane Gordon, after the village of Dunkeld, Tayside, Scotland.

Dunkeld State School opened on 25 January 1965.

== Demographics ==
In the 2016 census, Dunkeld had a population of 41 people.

In the 2021 census, Dunkeld had a population of 49 people.

== Education ==
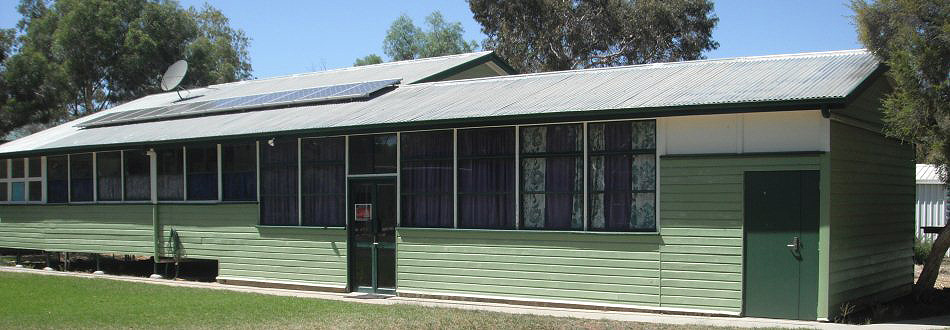
Dunkeld State School

Dunkeld State School is a government primary (Prep-6) school for boys and girls at Mitchell-St George Road (26.9579°S 148.0603°E). In 2017, the school had an enrolment of 9 students with 1 teacher and 5 non-teaching staff (1 full-time equivalent). In 2018, the school had an enrolment of 3 students with 2 teachers (1 full-time equivalent) and 4 non-teaching staff (1 full-time equivalent). In 2023, the school had an enrolment of 11 students.

There are no secondary schools in Dunkeld with the nearest being Mitchell State School (to Year 10) in Mitchell to the north, but for many parts of Dunkeld, it would be too distant for a daily commute. There are no secondary nearby schools providing schooling to Year 12 with the closest being Roma State College in Roma, 122km to the north-east; the alternatives are distance education and boarding school.
