= Bollon, Queensland =

Bollon
- Town
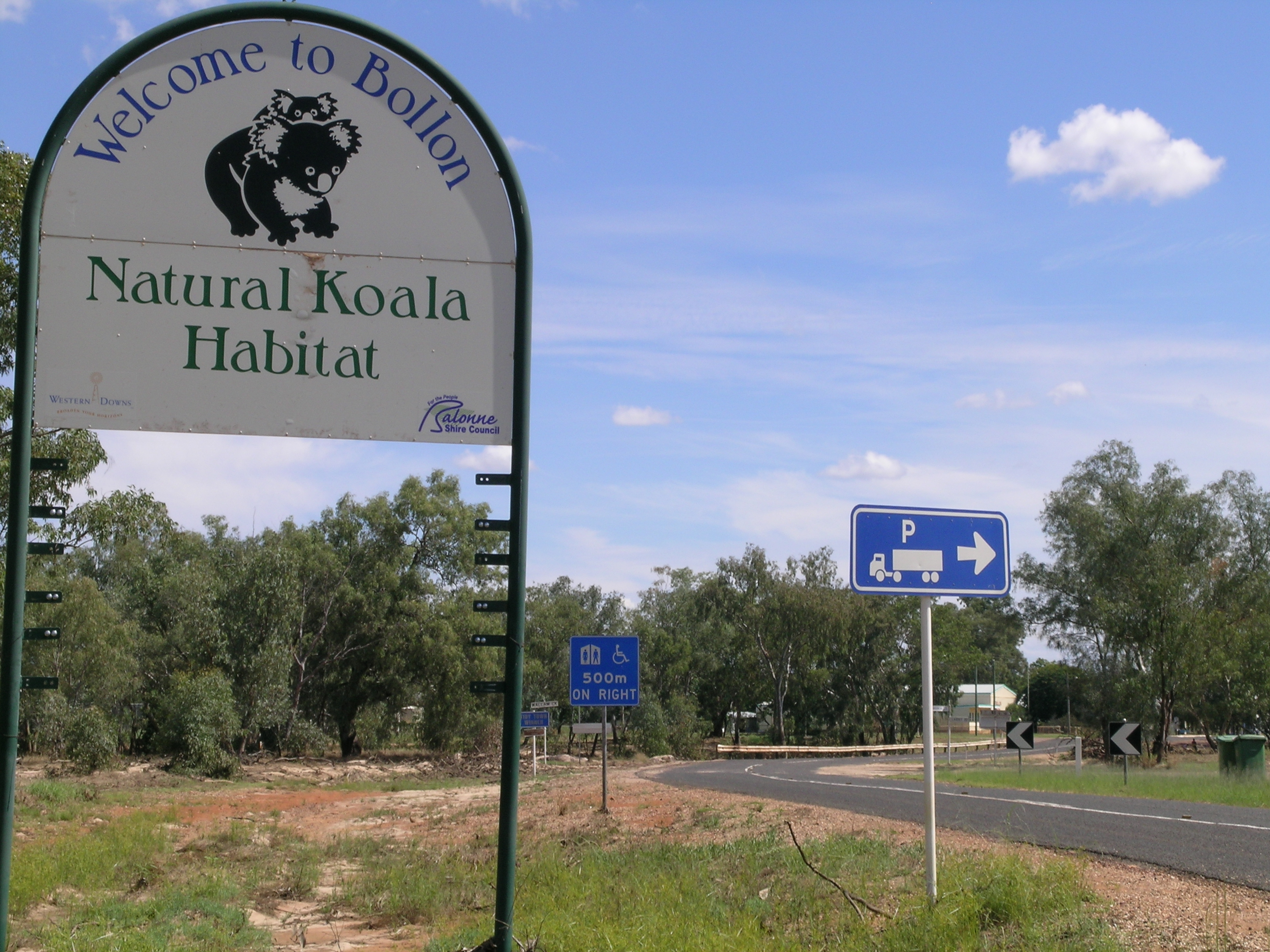
- The entrance sign to Bollon

- Interactive map of Bollon
- Coordinates: 28.0330°S 147.48°E
- Country: Australia
- State: Queensland
- LGA: Shire of Balonne
- Location: 114 km (71 mi) W of St George; 531 km (330 mi) W of Toowoomba; 610 km (380 mi) W of Brisbane
- Established: 1879

Government
  - State electorate: Warrego
  - Federal division: Maranoa

Area
  - Total: 7,114.2 km^{2} (2,746.8 sq mi)
- Elevation: 183 m (600 ft)

Population
  - Total: 174 (2021 census)
  - Density: 0.02446/km^{2} (0.06335/sq mi)
- Time zone: UTC+10:00 (AEST)
- Postcode: 4488
- Mean max temp: 28.0 °C (82.4 °F)
- Mean min temp: 13.2 °C (55.8 °F)
- Annual rainfall: 459.1 mm (18.07 in)
Localities around Bollon
Nebine	Bindebango	St George
Nebine	Bollon	Dirranbandi
Jobs Gate	Hebel	Dirranbandi

Bollon is a rural town and locality in the Shire of Balonne, Queensland, Australia. In the 2021 census, the locality of Bollon had a population of 174 people.

== Geography ==
Bollon is in South West Queensland, 634 kilometres (394 mi) west of the state capital, Brisbane. Bollon is situated on the Balonne Highway, between St George and Cunnamulla on the banks of Wallam Creek. A stand of River red gums along the creek is home to a large colony of koalas.

=== Climate ===
Climate data for Bollon, Queensland (1991–2020 normals, extremes 1957–present)
Month	Jan	Feb	Mar	Apr	May	Jun	Jul	Aug	Sep	Oct	Nov	Dec	Year
Record high °C (°F)	47.0 (116.6)	46.5 (115.7)	43.2 (109.8)	37.7 (99.9)	33.9 (93.0)	30.0 (86.0)	31.1 (88.0)	37.1 (98.8)	40.0 (104.0)	42.4 (108.3)	45.6 (114.1)	45.7 (114.3)	47.0 (116.6)
Mean daily maximum °C (°F)	36.2 (97.2)	34.5 (94.1)	32.6 (90.7)	28.6 (83.5)	23.7 (74.7)	20.2 (68.4)	19.9 (67.8)	22.5 (72.5)	26.9 (80.4)	30.3 (86.5)	33.1 (91.6)	35.1 (95.2)	28.6 (83.5)
Daily mean °C (°F)	29.5 (85.1)	28.0 (82.4)	25.7 (78.3)	21.2 (70.2)	16.5 (61.7)	13.3 (55.9)	12.3 (54.1)	14.3 (57.7)	18.6 (65.5)	22.5 (72.5)	25.7 (78.3)	27.9 (82.2)	21.3 (70.3)
Mean daily minimum °C (°F)	22.8 (73.0)	21.6 (70.9)	18.8 (65.8)	13.7 (56.7)	9.2 (48.6)	6.4 (43.5)	4.7 (40.5)	6.0 (42.8)	10.4 (50.7)	14.6 (58.3)	18.2 (64.8)	20.7 (69.3)	13.9 (57.0)
Mean minimum °C (°F)	10.3 (50.5)	8.3 (46.9)	7.2 (45.0)	0.0 (32.0)	−3.3 (26.1)	−5.5 (22.1)	−4.7 (23.5)	−4.5 (23.9)	−0.6 (30.9)	1.1 (34.0)	5.2 (41.4)	8.3 (46.9)	−5.5 (22.1)
Average precipitation mm (inches)	66.6 (2.62)	56.9 (2.24)	45.5 (1.79)	18.8 (0.74)	21.0 (0.83)	28.5 (1.12)	22.7 (0.89)	15.8 (0.62)	21.6 (0.85)	36.7 (1.44)	54.4 (2.14)	52.8 (2.08)	441.2 (17.37)
Average precipitation days (≥ 1.0 mm)	4.8	4.5	3.1	2.3	2.6	2.7	2.8	2.0	2.6	4.1	5.0	4.9	41.4
Source 1: National Oceanic and Atmospheric Administration
Source 2: Bureau of Meteorology

== History ==
Gunya (Kunya, Kunja, Kurnja) is an Australian Aboriginal language spoken by the Gunya people. The Gunya language region includes the landscape within the local government boundaries of the Paroo Shire Council, taking in Cunnamulla and extending north towards Augathella, east towards Bollon and west towards Thargomindah.

The town is thought to be named after the Mandandanji language word balun or balonn meaning water or a running stream.

On 26 June 1879 the Queensland Government auctioned 40 town lots and 12 suburban lots in Bollon. By June 1880, the town had a hotel (the Great Western), a store and a postal receiving office.

Bollon Provisional School opened on 27 July 1885. On 1 January 1902 it became Bollon State School.

On Sunday 16 February 1936, St Mary's Anglican Church was officially opened and dedicated by Bishop Horace Dixon.

In 2010, Narkoola National Park was established in the west of the town's boundaries to preserve plant communities of the Mulga Lands bioregion.

On Saturday 22 February 2025, the Bollon Hotel was burned down. It was the only hotel in Bollon. The hotel was built in 1954, replacing a previous hotel which burned down in 1951, and was the fourth hotel on that site which has hosted a hotel for more than 130 years.

== Demographics ==
In the 2011 census, the locality of Bollon had a population of 334 people.

In the 2016 census, the locality of Bollon had a population of 221 people.

In the 2021 census, the locality of Bollon had a population of 174 people.

== Education ==
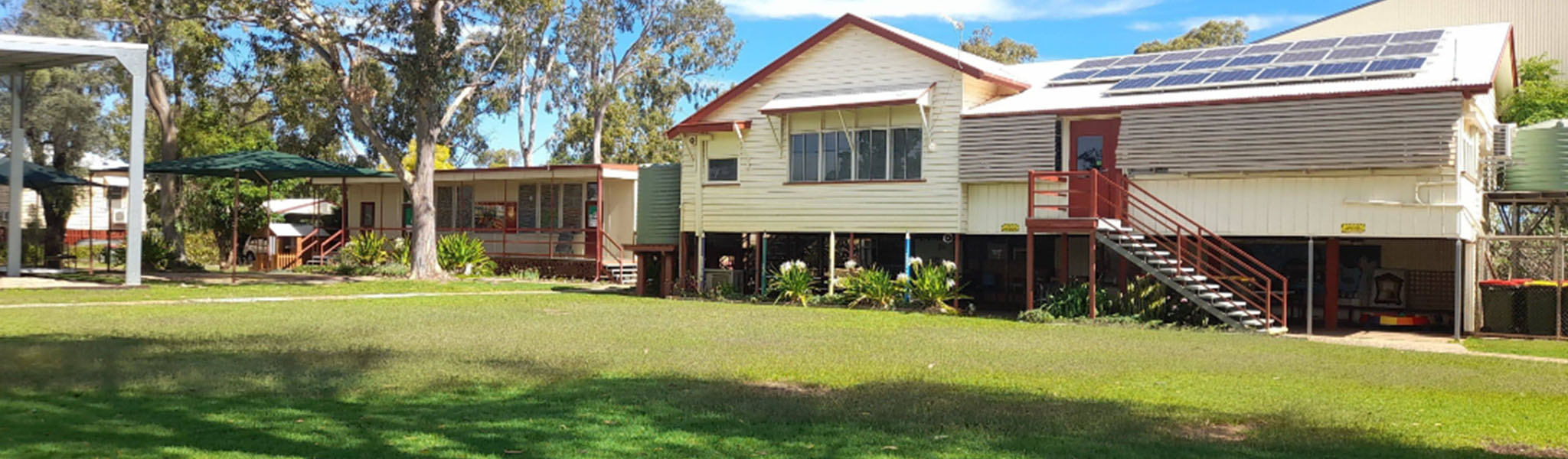
Bollon State School, 2025

Bollon State School is a government primary (Prep-6) school for boys and girls at 60-74 Main Street (28.0315°S 147.4756°E). In 2017, the school had an enrolment of 23 students with 5 teachers (3 full-time equivalent) and 5 non-teaching staff (2 full-time equivalent).

There are no secondary schools nearby Bollon. The alternatives are distance education and boarding school.

== Amenities ==
Bollon has the Bollon Civic Centre, showground and a park.

Balonne Shire Council operates a library in Main Street, next to the Civic Centre.

The Bollon branch of the Queensland Country Women's Association has its rooms at 17 Main Street.

St Mary The Virgin Anglican Church is at 25-27 Belmore Street (corner of George Street, 28.0339°S 147.4799°E).

== Attraction ==
Bollon Heritage Centre is a local history museum at 23 Main Street (28.0316°S 147.4806°E).
