= Mungallala South, Queensland =

Mungallala South
- Suburb
- Interactive map of Mungallala South
- Coordinates: 26.7561°S 147.475°E
- Country: Australia
- State: Queensland
- LGA: Maranoa Region
- Location: 46.6 km (29.0 mi) SW of Mitchell; 133 km (83 mi) W of Roma; 483 km (300 mi) WNW of Toowoomba; 611 km (380 mi) WNW of Brisbane

Government
  - State electorate: Warrego
  - Federal division: Maranoa

Area
  - Total: 2,367.1 km^{2} (913.9 sq mi)

Population
  - Total: 38 (2021 census)
  - Density: 0.01605/km^{2} (0.0416/sq mi)
- Time zone: UTC+10:00 (AEST)
- Postcode: 4467
Suburbs around Mungallala South
Morven	Mungallala	Womalilla
Boatman	Mungallala South	V Gate
Bargunyah	Bargunyah	Bargunyah

Mungallala South is a rural locality in the Maranoa Region, Queensland, Australia. In the 2021 census, Mungallala South had a population of 38 people.

Mungallala South's postcode is 4467.

== Geography ==
The land use is predominantly grazing on native vegetation.

== History ==
The name Mungallala comes from the town and pastoral run name. It is derived from the Kunggari language, from mungar/kungar meaning bird and yaya/lala meaning shout, describing the sound of the claws of running emu.

== Demographics ==
In the 2016 census, Mungallala South had a population of 24 people.

In the 2021 census, Mungallala South had a population of 38 people.

== Education ==
There are no schools in Mungallala South. The nearest government primary schools are Mungallala State School in neighbouring Mungallala to the north and Mitchell State School in Mitchell to the north-east. The nearest government secondary school is Mitchell State School to Year 10 only. There are no secondary schools offering education to Year 12 nearby (the nearest is in Roma). Some parts of the locality will be too distant to attend any of these as a daily commute and the alternatives are distance education and boarding school.
