= Widgeegoara, Queensland =

Widgeegoara
- Suburb
- Interactive map of Widgeegoara
- Coordinates: 28.3394°S 146.3172°E
- Country: Australia
- State: Queensland
- LGA: Shire of Paroo
- Location: 78.4 km (48.7 mi) SE of Cunnamulla; 276 km (171 mi) WSW of St George; 432 km (268 mi) SW of Roma; 644 km (400 mi) W of Toowoomba; 835 km (519 mi) W of Brisbane

Government
  - State electorate: Warrego
  - Federal division: Maranoa

Area
  - Total: 2,612.4 km^{2} (1,008.7 sq mi)

Population
  - Total: 19 (2021 census)
  - Density: 0.00727/km^{2} (0.0188/sq mi)
- Time zone: UTC+10:00 (AEST)
- Postcode: 4490
Suburbs around Widgeegoara
Cunnamulla	Linden	Linden
Cunnamulla	Widgeegoara	Nebine
Tuen	Noorama	Jobs Gate

Widgeegoara is a rural locality in the Shire of Paroo, Queensland, Australia. In the 2021 census, Widgeegoara had a population of 19 people.

== Geography ==
Noorama Creek and Widgeegoara Creek flow through the locality from the north-west (Cunnamulla) to the south (Noorama). These creeks are distributaries of the Warrego River.

The predominant land use is grazing of cattle and sheep.

== History ==
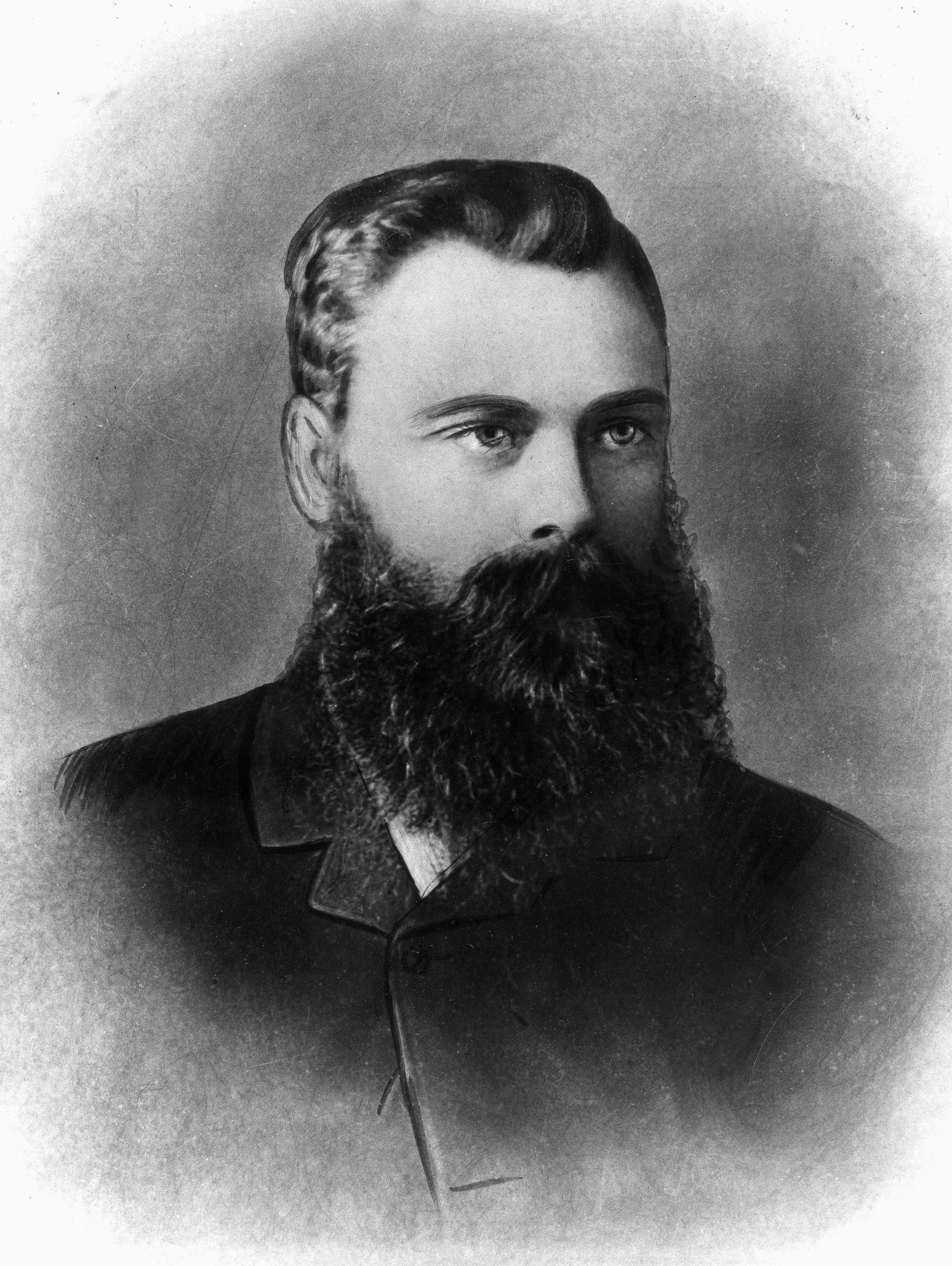
Edmund Bignell, owner of Widgeegoara station

The locality's name come from the parish and creek of the same name, which in turn was the name of a pastoral run used since 1867. It is believed to be an Aboriginal word combination meaning turn around quickly.

In 1878, the Widgeegoara Station was described when offered for sale as:

The well-known Widgeegoara Station, in the Warrego district, situate about 180 miles from Bourke, and containing about 180 square miles of magnificent sheep country, consisting of open plains, heavily grassed with blue, barley, and other grasses and herbage, and saltbush in abundance, and is of the most fattening description. The run is abundantly watered, having fifteen miles frontage to the Widgeegoara Creek, with two large dams, and has also two tanks, one of 12,000 yards, with ten miles of drains leading into it, and one of 800 yards, and two fresh-water wells, one of which has been in constant use for five years, and gives a good supply. The tanks and dams are all full at present. The improvements also comprise home paddock, stock and sheep yards, a good dwelling-house, with kitchen, store, outhouses, and stable. The run will be sold without stock. The wethers from this station have averaged 621b. in the Sydney market.

In October 1884, Messrs Bignell of Widgeegoara Station successfully constructed a bore that obtained sub-artesian water, the first in Queensland.

Widgeegoara Provisional School opened circa 1898. From May 1903 it was a half-time school operated in conjunction with Abbadoah Provisional School (presumably at Abbadoah Station at 28.04983°S 145.85872°E) with a single teacher serving at the two schools, but that arrangement was reversed in June 1903 with the teacher returning to Widgeegoara Provisional School on a full-time basis. However, due to low student numbers, the school was closed in either late 1903 or early 1904.

== Demographics ==
In the 2016 census, Widgeegoara had a population of 34 people.

In the 2021 census, Widgeegoara had a population of 19 people.

== Education ==
There are no schools in Widgeegoara. The nearest government primary and secondary school is Cunnamulla State School in neighbouring Cunnamulla to the west. However, due to the size of Widgeegoara, a daily commute to Cunnamulla would only be viable students living in the west of the locality. For students in other parts of the locality, the alternatives are distance education and boarding school.
