= V Gate, Queensland =

V Gate
- Suburb
- Interactive map of V Gate
- Coordinates: 26.8513°S 147.8161°E
- Country: Australia
- State: Queensland
- LGA: Maranoa Region
- Location: 76.8 km (47.7 mi) SW of Mitchell; 163 km (101 mi) WSW of Roma; 513 km (319 mi) WNW of Toowoomba; 638 km (396 mi) WNW of Brisbane

Government
  - State electorate: Warrego
  - Federal division: Maranoa

Area
  - Total: 1,021.7 km^{2} (394.5 sq mi)

Population
  - Total: 40 (2021 census)
  - Density: 0.039/km^{2} (0.101/sq mi)
- Time zone: UTC+10:00 (AEST)
- Postcode: 4465
Suburbs around V Gate
Mungallala South	Womalilla	Eurella
Mungallala South	V Gate	Dunkeld
Bargunyah	Bargunyah	Dunkeld

V Gate is a rural locality in the Maranoa Region, Queensland, Australia. In the 2021 census, V Gate had a population of 40 people.

== Geography ==
The Mitchell - St George Road enters the locality from the north (Womalilla) and loosely follows the eastern boundary of the locality, exiting via the locality's south-eastern corner (Dunkeld).

The land use is grazing on native vegetation.

== Demographics ==
In the 2016 census, V Gate had a population of 29 people.

In the 2021 census, V Gate had a population of 40 people.

== Education ==
There are no schools in V Gate. The nearest government schools are Dunkeld State School (Prep to Year 6) in neighbouring Dunkeld to the south-east and Mitchell State School (Prep to Year 10) in Mitchell to the north. However, students in some parts of Dunkeld would be too distant to either of these schools. Also, there is no nearby school offering secondary education to Year 12. The alternatives are distance education and boarding school.
