= The Robbers Tree =

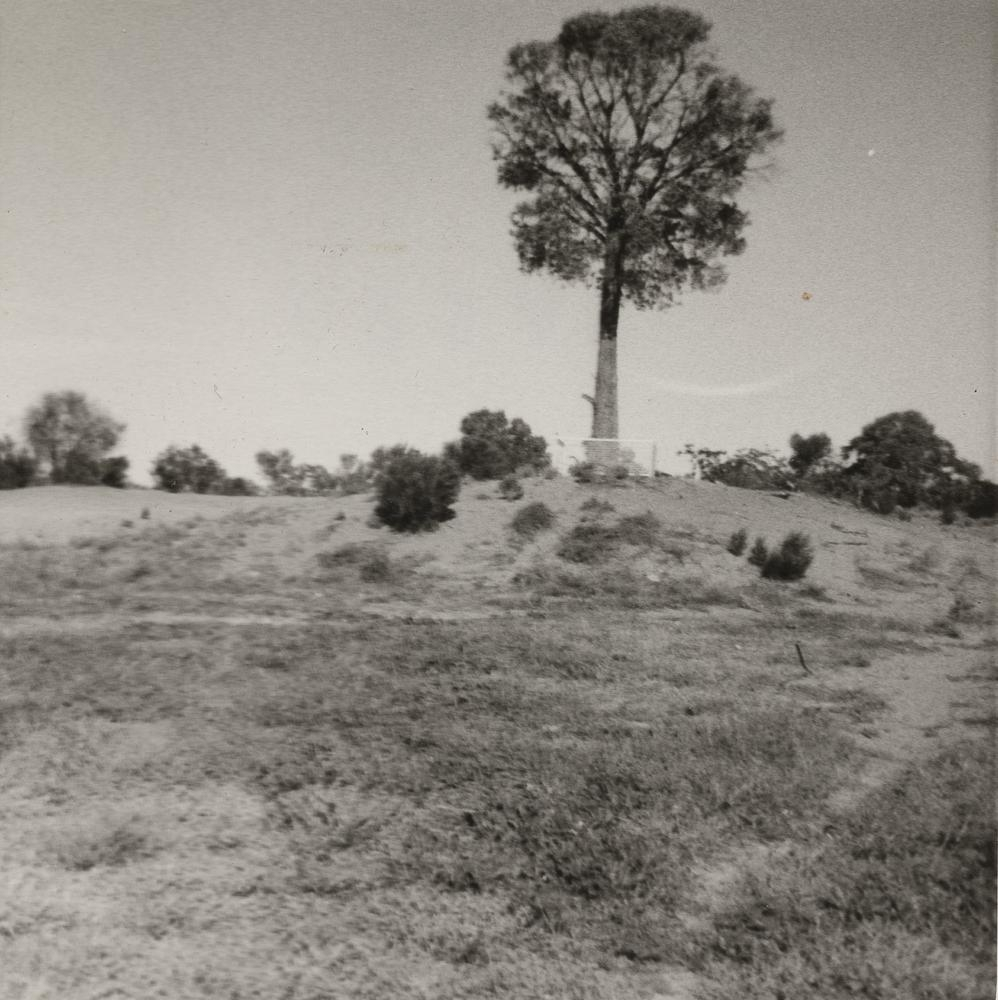
- Robbers Tree, circa 1920

- Location within Queensland
- 28.074°S 145.6817°E
- Location: Stockyard Street, Cunnamulla, Shire of Paroo, Queensland, Australia

Queensland Heritage Register
- Official name: The Robbers Tree
- Type: state heritage (landscape)
- Designated: 21 October 1992
- Reference no.: 600762
- Significant period: 1880 (historical); 1880–ongoing (social)

The Robbers Tree is a heritage-listed tree at Stockyard Street, Cunnamulla, Shire of Paroo, Queensland, Australia. It was added to the Queensland Heritage Register on 21 October 1992.

== History ==
Although the Warrego River district in southwest Queensland was explored briefly by Thomas Mitchell in 1846 and Edmund Kennedy in 1847, the main impetus for pastoral development of the Warrego occurred in the 1860s, following William Landsborough's exploration of the area in 1862 during his search for the ill-fated Burke and Wills expedition. In 1862 Landsborough and his second in command, George Bourne, both published journals of their expedition from the Gulf of Carpentaria south to Melbourne, identifying good pastoral land along the Warrego River.

In 1867 a petition was presented to the Queensland Parliament seeking the establishment of a town reserve at the intersection of two main stock routes beside the Warrego River, and the township of Cunnamulla was surveyed the same year. The name is thought to be an Aboriginal term meaning "long stretch of water".

By 1871 Cunnamulla had a population of 45. The town grew slowly in the 1870s, gaining momentum toward the end of the decade. A court house reserve was surveyed in 1874, and the 1874 Postal Directory lists a police magistrate who also conducted the court of petty sessions, a police inspector, a post master and a poundkeeper. A branch of the Queensland Government Savings Bank also operated by this date. The Cunnamulla State School was established in 1878, and in 1879 the Paroo Divisional Board, based at Cunnamulla, was proclaimed. The period 1880 to 1900 was one of consolidation for the town, which became the service centre for an expanding pastoral district. Cobb & Co began to run passenger coaches from Charleville to Cunnamulla in 1881, and gained the mail contract in 1883. By 1881 two banks were operating in the town, the Queensland National Bank established by January 1880, and the Commercial Banking Company of Sydney, opened in 1880. The town became a railhead in the late 1890s when the Western railway line arrived in the town from Charleville.

In 1880 an incident occurred that provided the township of Cunnamulla with considerable publicity. On 16 January 1880 Joseph Wells, a station hand, robbed the Queensland National Bank at Cunnamulla at gunpoint. The alarm was raised and as Wells was about to leave the bank, storekeeper William Murphy from next door attempted to restrain him and in the scuffle, was shot accidentally in the shoulder. This allowed Wells to escape from the bank, only to find that a crowd of onlookers was gathering outside.

As he tried to leave the scene on horseback, the horse's bridle broke and, in desperation, the robber ran toward the outskirts of the town. Amongst the crowd of onlookers were two men with unloaded guns, who gave chase. Turning on them and threatening to shoot if they didn't retreat, Wells ran into the bush.

The police were alerted and organised an intensive search for the robber, who may have escaped detection but for the persistence of a sheep dog which had followed Wells' scent and sat barking under a tree. On investigating, the local police sergeant discovered that Wells had taken refuge in the branches of the tree, where he was well camouflaged.

Wells was arrested and stood trial in Toowoomba, charged with armed robbery with wounding. He was found guilty and received the maximum penalty, death. Because of the accidental nature of Murphy's wounding and the fact that Wells had not had legal representation during his trial, opponents of capital punishment, including several Members of Parliament, appealed to the Full Court on Wells' behalf. Despite these appeals and much debate about capital punishment in the Queensland press, Wells was executed on 22 March 1880 and buried in the Toowong Cemetery.

However, the saga had its legacy, with Wells becoming the last man to be executed for armed robbery with wounding in Queensland. One of his supporters, Arthur Rutledge MLA, on becoming Attorney General (November 1883 to June 1888), legislated to have armed robbery removed from the list of capital offences in Queensland.

The tree in which Wells hid has become integrally associated with the robber's story and its outcome, and is a feature of interest to tourists.

On Wednesday 29 September 2021, the tree was severely damaged in a storm with gale force winds.

== Description ==
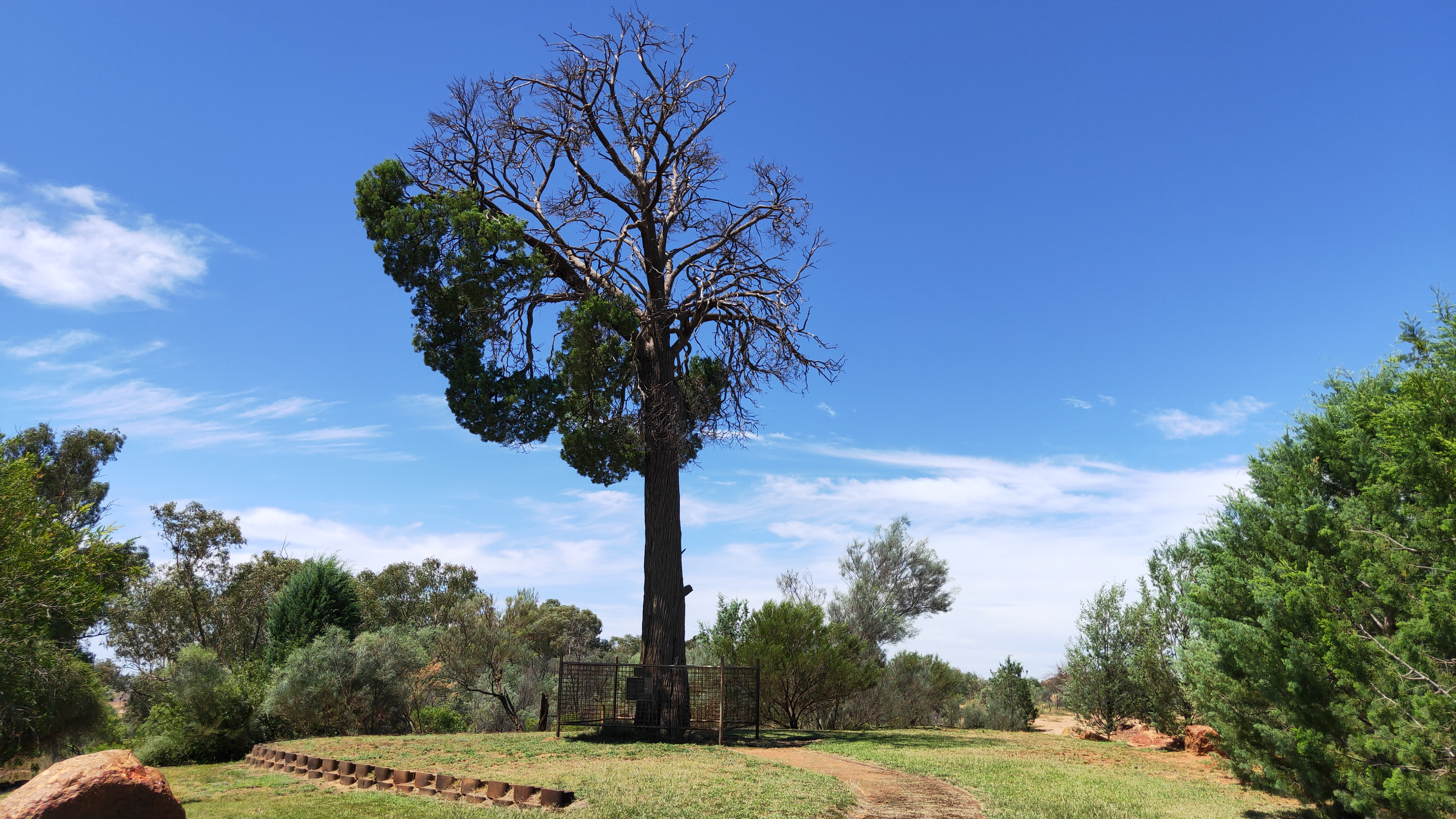
The Robbers Tree, March 2021

The Robber's Tree is situated on the outskirts of Cunnamulla at the southern end of Stockyard Street, near the corner of Bedford Street, on a low sand ridge. A low fence of metal posts and wire has been constructed around it.

The tree is a mature specimen, said to be a Cypress Pine (Callitris cupressiformis), measuring 15 metres (49 ft) high in 1979. The Cypress Pine is an Australian native, resistant to dry, sandy conditions, and is found in all Australian states.

== Heritage listing ==
The Robbers Tree was listed on the Queensland Heritage Register on 21 October 1992 having satisfied the following criteria.

The place is important in demonstrating the evolution or pattern of Queensland's history.

Local legend connects this tree with the story of a robbery in Cunnamulla in 1880, which had repercussions for the practice of capital punishment in Queensland.

The place has a strong or special association with a particular community or cultural group for social, cultural or spiritual reasons.

The Robber's Tree is significant for its strong social value to the community as the focus of a local bushranger legend in southwest Queensland and it has become a feature of interest to tourists.
