= Narkoola National Park =

National park in Australia

- IUCN category II (national park)
- Location within Queensland
- Location: Queensland
- Nearest city: Bollon
- Coordinates: 28°2′0″S 147°3′28″E
- Area: 117.99 km^{2} (45.56 sq mi)
- Established: 2010
- Governing body: Queensland Parks and Wildlife Service

Narkoola National Park is a national park at Bollon in the Shire of Balonne of South West Queensland, Australia. It was established on 26 March 2010 to conserve significant species and diverse plant communities. The park covers 11,799 hectares (29,160 acres) in the Mulga Lands bioregion, with another 2,249 ha (5,560 acres) marked for recovery.

== See also ==
- Protected areas of Queensland
