= Cuttaburra, Queensland =

Cuttaburra
- Suburb
- Cuttaburra Creek floodplain woodlands

- Interactive map of Cuttaburra
- Coordinates: 28.7472°S 145.375°E
- Country: Australia
- State: Queensland
- LGA: Shire of Paroo
- Location: 77 km (48 mi) SSW of Cunnamulla; 200 km (120 mi) N of Bourke; 865 km (537 mi) W of Brisbane; 957 km (595 mi) NW of Sydney

Government
  - State electorate: Warrego
  - Federal division: Maranoa

Area
  - Total: 3,036.9 km^{2} (1,172.6 sq mi)
- Elevation: 175 m (574 ft)

Population
  - Total: 22 (2021 census)
  - Density: 0.00724/km^{2} (0.0188/sq mi)
- Time zone: UTC+10:00 (AEST)
- Postcode: 4490
Suburbs around Cuttaburra
Eulo	Cunnamulla	Tuen
Hungerford	Cuttaburra	Barringun
Yantabulla (NSW)	Enngonia (NSW)	Enngonia (NSW)

Cuttaburra is a rural locality in the Shire of Paroo, Queensland, Australia. It is on the Queensland border with New South Wales. In the 2021 census, Cuttaburra had a population of 22 people.

== Geography ==
Cuttaburra Creek is a tributary of the Warrego River, joining it south of Cunnamulla. The creek forms the north-east boundary of the locality.

The southern boundary of the locality is the border of Queensland with New South Wales (latitude 29 South).

In 1916, geologist and palaeontologist Robert Etheridge described the area as having "shifting" sand hills and claypans. The shifting sand hills were of colours that varied by colour from a yellowish tint to a deep brick red and were up to 50 feet in height. He observed that the wind drove these shifting sand hills along over time. He said that the claypans were:

"shallow depressions, more or less oval or circular in outline, large or small, distributed throughout the red soil country, treeless, often bearing a copious growth of grass, particularly cane grass and various kinds of salt-bush. These pans are water-bearing in wet seasons, but otherwise dry, and in flood time many of them, no doubt, communicate with one another. Of this nature appears to be the Cuttaburra branch of the Paroo River, an indescribable flat and weird surface of great extent."

The Binya National Park is located within the locality on the south-western boundary. Apart from this protected area, the land use is predominantly grazing on native vegetation.

== History ==
The Cuttaburra Creek is shown on an 1872 map of Queensland. The locality name is believed to derive from the creek name and is thought to be an Aboriginal word. In some New South Wales Aboriginal languages the word burra means hill ants.

Cuttaburra Provisional School opened in 1899. It closed circa 1906.

== Demographics ==
In the 2016 census, Cuttaburra had a population of 10 people.

In the 2021 census, Cuttaburra had a population of 22 people.

== Education ==
The nearest government primary schools are Eulo State School in neighbouring Eulo to the north-west and Cunnamulla State School in neighbouring Cunnamulla to the north. The nearest government secondary school is Cunnamulla State School (to Year 12). However, students in most of Cuttaburra would be too distant to attend these schools; the alternatives are distance education and boarding school.
