= Paroo Shire Honour Board =

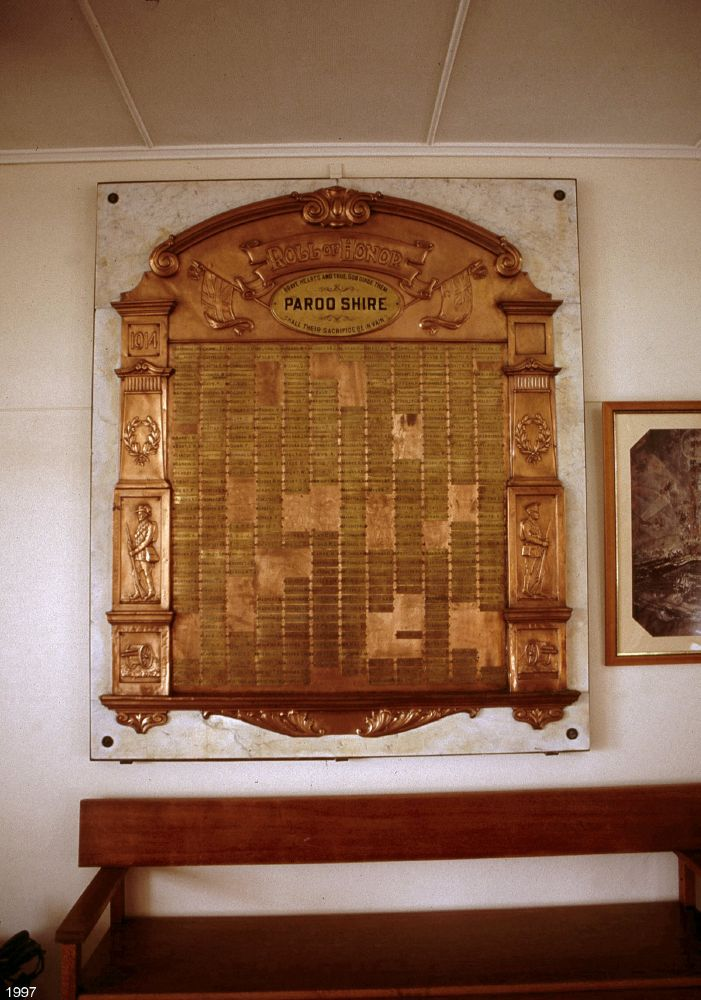
- Paroo Shire Honour Board, 1997

- Location within Queensland
- 28.0703°S 145.6818°E
- Location: Civic Centre, Louise Street, Cunnamulla, Shire of Paroo, Queensland, Australia

History
- Design period: 1914–1919 (World War I)
- Built: 1918

Queensland Heritage Register
- Official name: Paroo Shire Honour Board
- Type: state heritage (built)
- Designated: 21 October 1992
- Reference no.: 600761
- Significant period: 1918– (social); 1918–1971 (historical); 1918 (fabric)
- Significant components: memorial – honour board/roll of honour
- Builders: Wunderlich

Paroo Shire Honour Board is a heritage-listed memorial at the Civic Centre, Louise Street, Cunnamulla, Shire of Paroo, Queensland, Australia. It was built in 1918 by Wunderlich. It was added to the Queensland Heritage Register on 21 October 1992.

== History ==
The Paroo Honour Board commemorates those from Paroo Shire who served in World War I and was unveiled in 1918 by the then Queensland Governor, Sir Hamilton John Goold-Adams. It was originally located in the old Paroo Shire Hall, but is now in the current Civic Centre.

Australia, and Queensland in particular, had few civic monuments before the First World War. The memorials erected in its wake became our first national monuments, recording the devastating impact of war on a young nation. Australia lost 60,000 from a population of about 4 million, representing one in five of those who served. No previous or subsequent war has made such an impact on the nation.

Australian war memorials are distinctive in that they commemorate not only the dead, but also those who fought and returned. Australians were proud that their first great national army was composed entirely of volunteers, men worthy of honour whether or not they paid the supreme sacrifice. Many memorials honour all who served from a locality, not just the dead, providing valuable evidence of community involvement in the war. Such evidence is not readily obtainable from military records, or from state or national listings, where names are categorised alphabetically or by military unit.

Many communities honoured their volunteers after the war ended, but the Paroo board is early and was installed before the close of hostilities. It has the date of the commencement of the war, 1914, on the left hand side of the memorial, but the corresponding space on the other side is empty. Spaces have also been left for names to be added. The design selected is a handsome, but standard type of Wunderlich honour board found in a number of other towns in Queensland. It commemorates all those from Paroo Shire who served in World War I, the dead not being indicated in any way.

Beneath the standard words "Roll of Honor" and British and Australian flags is a plaque on which "Paroo Shire" is encircled by the commemorative inscriptions "Brave hearts and true, God guide them" and "Shall their sacrifice be in vain?" This is an uncommon challenge; a more usual inscription on similar Wunderlich honour boards is 'Those who answered the Empire's call'.

The Honour Board was relocated to the public foyer of the new Civic Centre in 1971. This was officially opened by the then Queensland Premier, Hon Joh Bjelke-Petersen on 23 April 1971.

== Description ==
The Paroo Honour Board is a panel of pressed copper; richly decorated in low relief with patriotic symbols such as flags, laurel wreaths and cannons. This decoration provides a rich frame for columns of names, each on an individual brass strip. The honour board is mounted on a marble slab, measuring 1.82 by 1.55 metres (6 ft 0 in × 5 ft 1 in), which is in turn mounted on a wooden frame with a bronze edge trim.

A total of 370 names of those who served in World War I are listed alphabetically with further spaces indicating that hostilities had not yet ceased at that time. In the tradition of memorials, the rank of the deceased is not indicated.

== Heritage listing ==
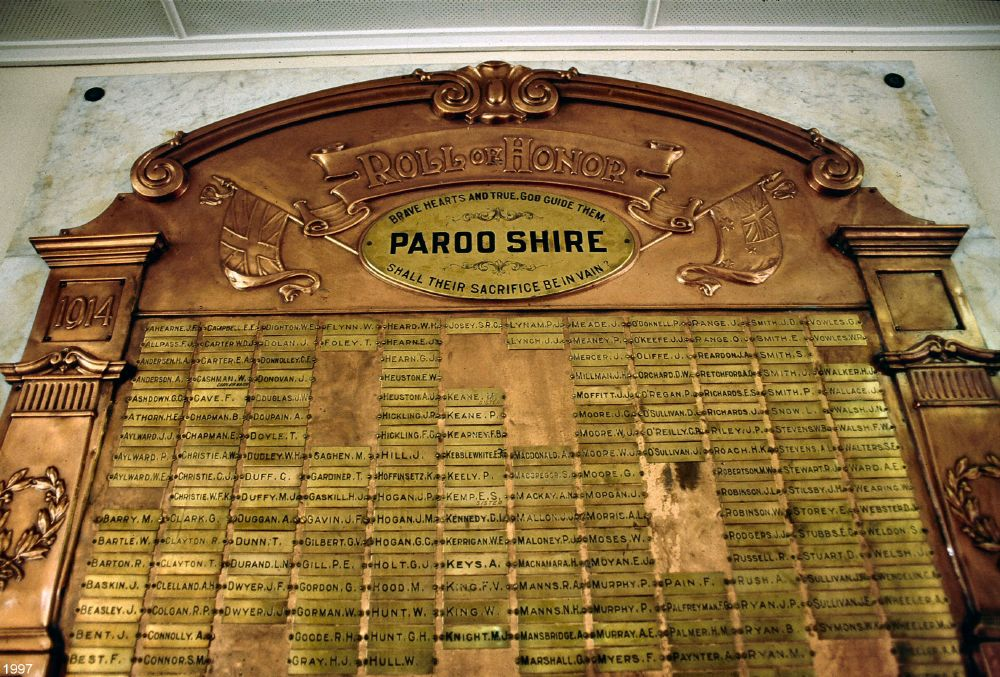
Close-up of the Paroo Shire Honour Board, 1997

Paroo Shire Honour Board was listed on the Queensland Heritage Register on 21 October 1992 having satisfied the following criteria.

The place is important in demonstrating the evolution or pattern of Queensland's history.

War memorials, including honour boards, especially those dating from the Boer and First World Wars, are a local tribute to war dead and are an important element of Queensland towns and cities. They represent a conscious expression of emerging Australian nationhood and reflect public taste and social attitudes of their time. Such memorials are important in demonstrating the pattern of Queensland's history, as they are representative of a recurrent theme that involved most communities throughout the state. They provide evidence of an era of widespread Australian patriotism and nationalism, particularly during and following the First World War.

The place demonstrates rare, uncommon or endangered aspects of Queensland's cultural heritage.

It has an unusual inscription that has not been found on another honour board in Queensland.

The place is important in demonstrating the principal characteristics of a particular class of cultural places.

The memorials manifest a unique documentary record and are demonstrative of popular taste in the inter-war period.

Unveiled in 1918, the Paroo Shire Honour Board is an intact example of a lavish, though typical Wunderlich honour board; richly decorated, it is a good example of the work of this firm.

The place is important because of its aesthetic significance.

Unveiled in 1918, the Paroo Shire Honour Board is an intact example of a lavish, though typical Wunderlich honour board; richly decorated, it is a good example of the work of this firm.

The place has a strong or special association with a particular community or cultural group for social, cultural or spiritual reasons.

The Paroo Shire Honour Board has strong association with the community as evidence of the impact of a major historic event. It is also associated with the work of Wunderlich, a company that was part of the fabric of the Australian building industry for much of the twentieth century.
