= Coongoola, Queensland =

Coongoola
- Suburb
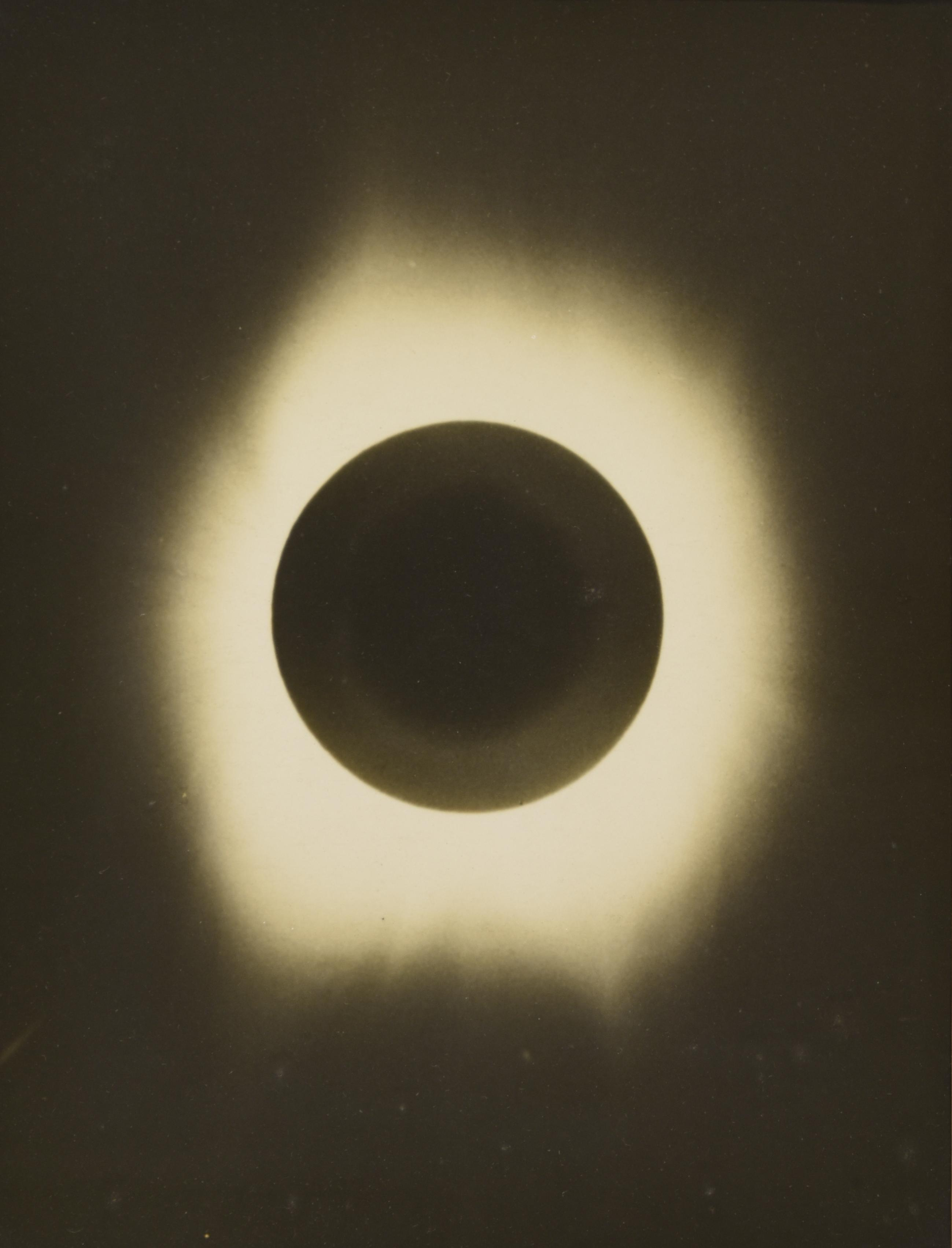
- Total eclipse of the sun, Coongoola, 1922

- Interactive map of Coongoola
- Coordinates: 27.7013°S 145.885°E
- Country: Australia
- State: Queensland
- LGA: Shire of Paroo
- Location: 53.0 km (32.9 mi) NE of Cunnamulla; 145 km (90 mi) SSW of Charleville; 311 km (193 mi) W of St George; 412 km (256 mi) WSW of Roma; 808 km (502 mi) W of Brisbane

Government
  - State electorate: Warrego
  - Federal division: Maranoa

Area
  - Total: 1,943.4 km^{2} (750.4 sq mi)

Population
  - Total: 16 (2021 census)
  - Density: 0.00823/km^{2} (0.0213/sq mi)
- Time zone: UTC+10:00 (AEST)
- Postcode: 4490
Suburbs around Coongoola
Wyandra	Wyandra	Wyandra
Humeburn	Coongoola	Linden
Cunnamulla	Cunnamulla	Cunnamulla

Coongoola is a rural locality in the Shire of Paroo, Queensland, Australia. In the 2021 census, Coongoola had a population of 16 people.

== Geography ==
The Mitchell Highway enters the locality from the north (Wyandra) and exits to the south (Cunnamulla).

The Warrego River enters the locality from the north (Wynandra) and exits to the south-west (Cunnamulla). It is an intermittent braided river that contributes to the Murray Darling river system.

The land use is grazing on native vegetation.

== History ==
The Western railway line opened to Cunnamulla in October 1898. It passed through Coongoola with the locality served by (from north to south):

- Mirrabooka railway station (27.4980°S 145.9273°E)
- Offham railway station (27.5516°S 145.9129°E)
- Coongoola railway station (27.6516°S 145.9029°E)
- Kubill railway station (27.7248°S 145.8923°E)
- Nardoo railway station (27.7908°S 145.8738°E)

In September 1922, Coongoola was visited by many scientific teams as well as the public because it was particularly well-located to view the solar eclipse as it had the longest period of totality of the eclipse and, being a quiet place, had nothing to interfere with the viewing. However, its lack of facilities was noted:

"Coongoola itself consists of a very small galvanized-iron railway station, and a small galvanized-iron hotel. Nothing else is in view except the Longlands homestead, over 2 miles back along the rails. Living accommodation of a homely character would be provided by Mrs. Kruck, landlady of the hotel, if reasonable notice is given. There are several bedrooms, and other rooms which can be temporarily converted. Altogether, arrangements can be made for 20 to 30 guests."

A special train service was provided from Charleville to Coongoola for those wishing to view the eclipse.

On the day of the eclipse, the weather conditions at Coongoola were ideal for people to view and photograph the eclipse and to record scientific observations.

Coongoola Provisional School opened on 22 June 1925. It became Coongoola State School in 1930. It closed on 2 April 1931.

The railway line to Cunnamulla ceased operation in 1994.

== Demographics ==
In the 2016 census, Coongoola had a population of 10 people.

In the 2021 census, Coongoola had a population of 16 people.

== Education ==
There are no schools in Coongoola. The nearest government primary schools are Cunnamulla State School in neighbouring Cunnamulla to south and Wyandra State School in neighbouring Wyandra to the north. The nearest government secondary school is Cunnamulla State School (to Year 12). However, some students in Coongoola may be too distant to attend these schools; the alternatives are distance education and boarding school.
