= Jobs Gate, Queensland =

Locality in Queensland, Australia

Jobs Gate
- Suburb
- Interactive map of Jobs Gate
- Coordinates: 28.8073°S 146.7331°E
- Country: Australia
- State: Queensland
- LGA: Shire of Paroo
- Location: 166 km (103 mi) SE of Cunnamulla; 261 km (162 mi) SW of St George; 362 km (225 mi) S of Charleville; 457 km (284 mi) SW of Roma; 758 km (471 mi) WSW of Brisbane

Government
  - State electorate: Warrego
  - Federal division: Maranoa

Area
  - Total: 1,468.5 km^{2} (567.0 sq mi)

Population
  - Total: 0 (2021 census)
  - Density: 0.0000/km^{2} (0.0000/sq mi)
- Time zone: UTC+10:00 (AEST)
- Postcode: 4490
Suburbs around Jobs Gate
Widgeegoara	Nebine	Bollon
Noorama	Jobs Gate	Hebel
Enngonia (NSW)	Weilmoringle (NSW)	Weilmoringle (NSW)

Jobs Gate is a rural locality in the Shire of Paroo, Queensland, Australia. It is on the border of Queensland and New South Wales. In the 2021 census, Jobs Gate had "no people or a very low population".

The abandoned town of Tego is in the south-east of the locality (28.8469°S 146.7852°E).

== Geography ==
The southern boundary of Jobs Gate is the border of Queensland and New South Wales.

Jobs Gate Road enters the locality from the west (Noorama) and exits to the south (Weilmoringle).

The south-east of the locality is within the Culgoa Floodplain National Park (28.9164°S 147.0111°E), which extends into neighbouring Hebel. The town of Tego is within the national park (but excised from the protected area). The Tego springs are approximately 600 metres (2,000 ft) ESE of the town (28.8494°S 146.7916°E) and are natural springs from the Great Artesian Basin. The springs were close to a stock route that commences in the area and extends to Cunnamulla.

Apart from the national park, the predominant land use is grazing on native vegetation.

== History ==
In March 1901 1,150 acres (470 ha) were reserved for the town of Tego. The gazettal of the town was published in the Queensland Government Gazette on 30 March 1901. It was originally called Tego Springs.

The motivation for establishing Tego was its location, approximately midway between Cunnamulla and Brewarrina (in New South Wales). Town lots were surveyed and sold, and in its early days the town had a hotel and other buildings. The hotel appears to have pre-dated the town being shown on a 1896 map. By 1924 only one cottage remained with two inhabitants. As at May 2020, there is no evidence of any structures remaining at the town.

== Demographics ==
In the 2016 census, Jobs Gate had a population of 6 people.

In the 2021 census, Jobs Gate had "no people or a very low population".

== Education ==
There are no schools in Jobs Gate. The nearest primary and secondary schools are in Cunnamulla, 166 kilometres (103 mi) away. Distance education and boarding schools are the alternatives.
