= Linden, Queensland =

Linden
- Suburb
- Interactive map of Linden
- Coordinates: 27.8263°S 146.3880°E
- Country: Australia
- State: Queensland
- LGA: Shire of Paroo
- Location: 97.1 km (60.3 mi) E of Cunnamulla; 127 km (79 mi) SW of Wyandra; 221 km (137 mi) W of St George; 588 km (365 mi) W of Toowoomba; 718 km (446 mi) W of Brisbane

Government
  - State electorate: Warrego
  - Federal division: Maranoa

Area
  - Total: 3,541.5 km^{2} (1,367.4 sq mi)

Population
  - Total: 0 (2021 census)
  - Density: 0.00000/km^{2} (0.0000/sq mi)
- Time zone: UTC+10:00 (AEST)
- Postcode: 4490
Suburbs around Linden
Wyandra	Wyandra	Nebine
Coongoola	Linden	Nebine
Cunnamulla	Nebine	Widgeegoara

Linden is a rural locality in the Shire of Paroo, Queensland, Australia. In the 2021 census, Linden had "no people or a very low population".

== Geography ==
Linden is in the Channel Country. It is flat land, about 180 to 200 metres above sea level. The Balonne Highway passes from east (Nebine) to west (Cunnamulla) through the southern part of the locality.

The land use is grazing on native vegetation.

== Demographics ==
In the 2016 census, Linden had a population of 20 people.

In the 2021 census, Linden had "no people or a very low population".

== Education ==
There are no schools in Linden. The nearest government primary schools are Wyandra State School in neighbouring Wyandra to the north-west and Cunnamulla State School in neighbouring Cunnamulla to the south-west. The nearest government secondary school is also Cunnamulla State School (to Year 12). However, for many parts of the locality, the distances involved will be too long for a daily commute; the alternatives are distance education and boarding school.

== Economy ==
There are a number of homesteads in the locality, including:

- Ardglen (27.9194°S 146.5003°E)
- Blairmore (27.9869°S 146.4218°E)
- Charlotte Vale (27.6625°S 146.1340°E)
- Clestraine (28.1313°S 146.3822°E)
- Clover Lake (27.7517°S 146.2600°E)
- Cobbrum (27.7282°S 146.3796°E)
- Deiran (28.0819°S 146.4766°E)
- Linden (27.6720°S 146.2927°E)
- Lulworth (27.6448°S 146.5369°E)
- Markarene (27.7654°S 146.5163°E)
- Mayvale (27.9442°S 146.1440°E)
- Melray (28.0581°S 146.5287°E)
- Mooro (27.5375°S 146.5604°E)
- Nara (27.8387°S 146.1208°E)
- Nulbear (27.7880°S 146.2619°E)
- South Glen (28.2173°S 146.5915°E)

== Transport ==
There are a number of airstrips in the locality, including:

- Blairmore airstrip (27.9853°S 146.4151°E)
- Heywood airstrip (27.8615°S 146.5317°E)
- Lulworth airstrip (27.6414°S 146.5400°E)
- Nulbear airstrip (27.7827°S 146.2617°E)
- South Glen airstrip (28.2153°S 146.5975°E)
