= Tuen, Queensland =

Tuen
- Suburb
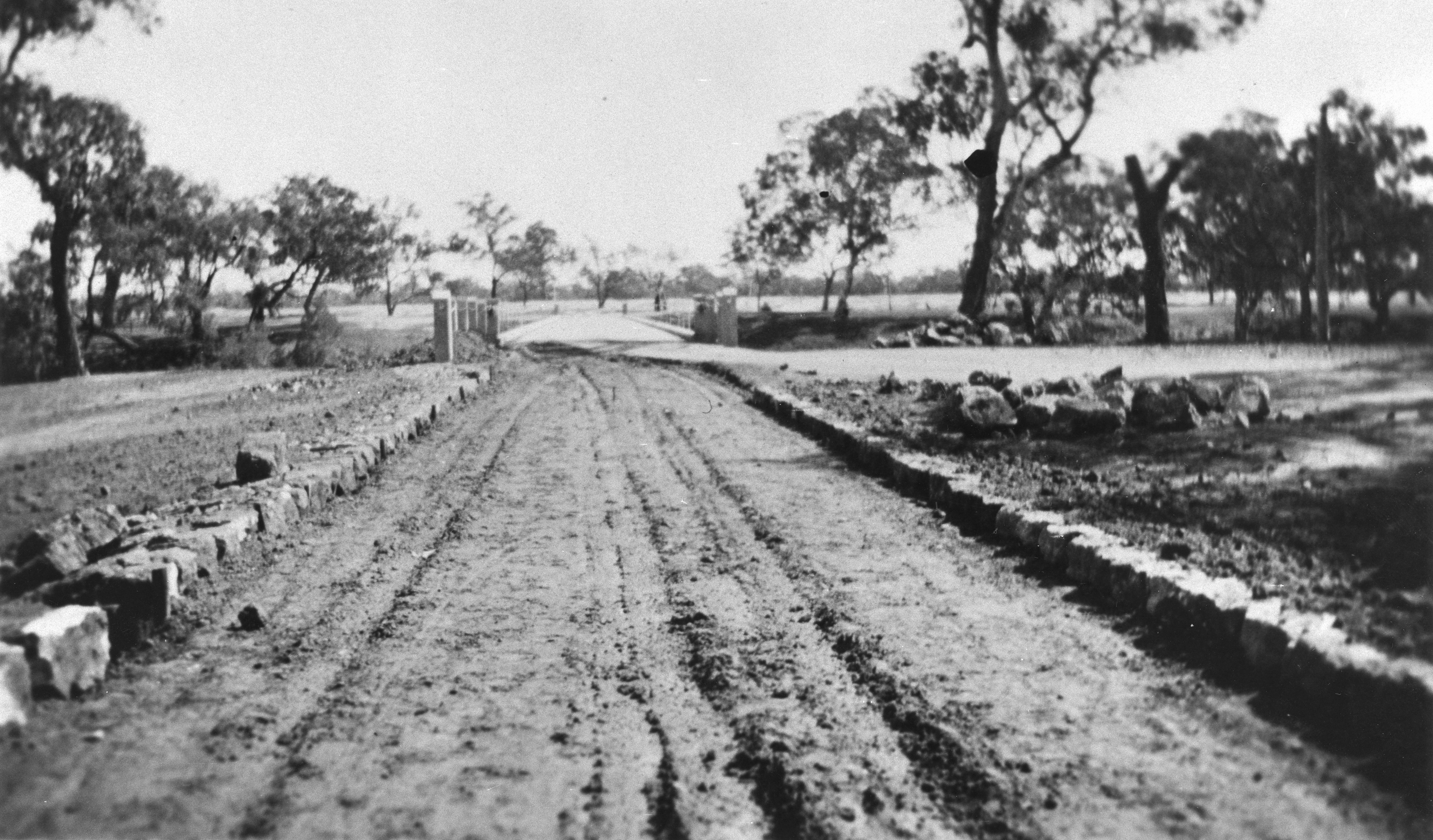
- Barringun Road approaching the bridge over Tuen Creek

- Interactive map of Tuen
- Coordinates: 28.5263°S 145.735°E
- Country: Australia
- State: Queensland
- LGA: Shire of Paroo
- Location: 68.8 km (42.8 mi) S of Cunnamulla; 352 km (219 mi) WSW of St George; 719 km (447 mi) W of Toowoomba; 851 km (529 mi) W of Brisbane

Government
  - State electorate: Warrego
  - Federal division: Maranoa

Area
  - Total: 1,075.1 km^{2} (415.1 sq mi)

Population
  - Total: 0 (2021 census)
  - Density: 0.0000/km^{2} (0.0000/sq mi)
- Time zone: UTC+10:00 (AEST)
- Postcode: 4490
Suburbs around Tuen
Cuttaburra	Cunnamulla	Widgeegoara
Cuttaburra	Tuen	Noorama
Cuttaburra	Barringun	Noorama

Tuen is an outback locality in the Shire of Paroo, Queensland, Australia. In the 2021 census, Tuen had "no people or a very low population".

== Geography ==
The Warrego River flows from the north of the locality through to the south. The Mitchell Highway (also known as Barringun Road) runs roughly parallel and east of the river. Tuen Creek flows from the south-east of the locality and joins the Warrego River in roughly the centre of the locality; the highway crosses Tuen Creek near the confluence and at that spot is the undeveloped town of Tuen, a grid of 4 x 3 streets (28.5659°S 145.70603°E).

The terrain is relatively flat at 160 to 180 metres (520 to 590 ft) above sea level.

The land use is predominantly grazing on native vegetation.

== History ==
The locality derives its name from Tuen Creek.

In April 1881, 57 town lots were offered for sale in the town of Tuen "at the junction of Warrego River and Tuen Creek" with prices starting from £8 per acre. Some lots were sold as 20 of them were owned by Margaret Heuston at her death in 1910. Her husband Robert Heuston operated the Tuen Hotel beside the Barringun Road until at least 1913, after which it may have been operated by the Gwydir family. In 1925, the hotel was taken over by retired policeman Robert Winterburn until at least 1934. There is no evidence the hotel was operating in the 1940s.

Today there is no visual evidence remaining of a town and no town is gazetted at that location.

== Demographics ==
In the 2016 census, Tuen had a population of 12 people.

In the 2021 census, Tuen had "no people or a very low population".

== Education ==
There are no schools in Tuen. The nearest primary and secondary school is Cunnamulla State School in neighbouring Cunnamulla to the north, but, due to the size of Tuen, it would only be accessible for a daily commute for students living in the north of Tuen. The alternatives are distance education and boarding school.
