= James Forsyth Thallon =

Lieutenant-Colonel James Forsyth Thallon
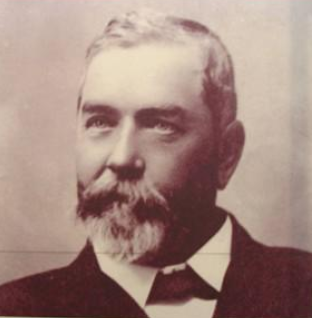
- Born: 21 November 1847; Markinch, Fifeshire, Scotland
- Died: 24 March 1911 (aged 63); Brisbane, Queensland
- Monuments: Toowong Cemetery (location: 11-71-14)
- Education: Markinch Public School
- Years active: 1862–1911
- Known for: Ninth Commissioner of Queensland Railways
- Title: Traffic Manager; General Traffic Manager; Commissioner of Railways
- Spouse: Jessie McLeish
- Children: Robert Forsyth Thallon (son) Euphemia Muriel Hulks (daughter)
- Parents: Robert Thallon (father); Jean Thallon (nee Forsayth) (mother)

James Forsyth Thallon (21 November 1847 – 24 March 1911) was the ninth Commissioner of Queensland Railways, Australia from 1902 to his death in 1911.

== Early life ==
James Forsyth Thallon was born at Markinch, Fifeshire, Scotland on 21 November 1847. The youngest of seven children, his father an artisan, died shortly before he was born. Raised by his mother, he left school at the age of 14 at which time the family relocated to Edinburgh.

== Railway career ==
=== Scotland ===
After plans to become an apprentice architect fell through, young James now 15, entered a clerkship at the head office of the Edinburgh, Perth and Dundee Railway (later North British Railway Company). His work ethic and capabilities quickly saw him rise through the ranks, being appointed as head of the rates and fares branch in 1875. Among his many achievements in this position was the successful introduction of intersystem through traffic between Ireland, Scotland, England and France, making use of the company's steam boats between the former.

=== Queensland, Australia ===
By 1881, Thallon was suffering from ill-health and commenced applying for positions in warmer climates. The position of Traffic Manager of the Southern and Western Railway in Queensland, Australia was advertised shortly afterwards, with his successful appointment confirmed in July 1882. Thallon emigrated to Australia taking up in the position the following September, however his appointment was short-lived. He resigned two months later on 26 November 1882 after clashing with the then Commissioner for Railways Arthur Herbert, over safety concerns. Herbert had insisted on running non-timetabled and construction trains without a train staff (a token which ensured only one train could be on a track section at a time), as a personnel cost-saving measure. Thallon's concerns were well founded, with a fatal head-on collision occurring on 3 October 1884 in a cutting between Oxley and Darra in Brisbane, between a passenger and materials train. The materials train had been running without a train staff. Six weeks later, at the request of the Queensland Government, Thallon returned as Traffic Manager of the Southern and Western Railways, quickly instituting stringent use of train staff and ticket to ensure safe train separation. Herbert was subsequently replaced as Commissioner for Railways by Francis Curnow in March 1885.

With the enactment of the Railway Act of 1888, which Thallon had assisted in drafting, a Board of three Commissioners was introduced to oversee decision making in the railways, in a bid to reduce political influence. The Board promoted Thallon as General Traffic Manager of Queensland Railways in November 1890, with a further promotion to Deputy Commissioner of Railways in July 1896. By this stage, the Board of three Commissioners had been reduced back to a single Commissioner, with Thallon serving under Robert Gray. In June 1899, he was appointed Military Director of Railway Transport in Queensland and bestowed the honorary title of Lieutenant-Colonel.

==== Commissioner of Railways ====
On 5 November 1902, Thallon became Commissioner of Railways, replacing Robert Gray who had succumbed to a long illness. His popular leadership oversaw a large expansion of the railway network in Queensland, culminating in a government sponsored study trip abroad to report on the management and operations of railway networks in Canada, England and South Africa in May 1908. Prior to his departure, in recognition of the high regard and esteem with which he was held, he was presented with numerous gifts on behalf of the citizens of Brisbane and Toowoomba, including an expensive moroccan leather address, a sovereign case and £560 in sovereigns (the equivalent of almost A$80,000 in 2018). Thallon promptly returned the monetary gift, requesting it instead be used to present a gold medal to the railway employee who gained the highest marks in the annual Queensland Railway Ambulance Corps exam. As of 2017, the annual Thallon Medal award was still in existence.

As was characteristic of his career, Thallon encouraged innovation as Commissioner, including:

- Improvements in carriage design of the Sydney Mail
- Importation of a Renard Road Train for early road haulage
- Importation of the McKeen Rail Cars, the first internal combustion rail passenger vehicles in Australia
- Creation of the Advertising Branch to harness external revenues (as Deputy Commissioner).

== Death ==
Thallon died at the age of 63 at the Mater Misericordiae in Brisbane from complications of Dengue Fever, which at that time was a common illness in Brisbane during the summer months.

His death was met with an immense outpouring of grief, with an estimated 10,000 people witnessing the combined state and military honours funeral procession from his residence in George Street, Brisbane City, to the Toowong Cemetery. A number of special trains to Brisbane were run for mourners from as far away as Toowoomba, Gympie and Southport. At 4 pm, coinciding with Thallon's interment, all trains in Queensland were stopped for two minutes as a mark of respect.

Thallon was replaced by Thomas King as Commissioner of Railways.

== Legacy ==
A subscription by employees of the railway department for the placement of a memorial for Thallon at Toowong Cemetery was undertaken, which was unveiled the following year. The size of the subscription, again reflecting the immense esteem within which Thallon was held, resulted in a significant balance remaining after costs for the monument were paid. As a result, the Thallon Memorial Medal for scholastic achievement was commenced. From 1913, gold medals were awarded to the four children of Queensland railway employees who attained the highest marks during the University of Queensland Junior Public Examination at the end of Year 10. The medals were discontinued when these examinations ceased at the end of 1970.

The township of Thallon in Queensland, was named after James Forsyth Thallon in 1911. The township of Forsayth (also in Queensland), was named after Thallon's mother's maiden name, but by some error differed in spelling with that taken by Thallon at birth.
