= Balonne Highway =

Balonne Highway Queensland
- Balonne Highway (green on black)

General information
- Type: Highway
- Length: 288 km (179 mi)
- Route number(s): State Route 49

Major junctions
- East end: Carnarvon Highway (State Highway A55), St George
- West end: Mitchell Highway (State Highway A71), Cunnamulla

Location(s)
- Major settlements: Bollon, Nebine, Linden

Highway system
- Highways in Australia; National Highway • Freeways in Australia; Highways in Queensland

The Balonne Highway, a state highway of Queensland, is the continuation westward of State Route 49 (Moonie Highway) from the town of St George to its termination at Cunnamulla. There are no large settlements between St George and Cunnamulla.

== Upgrades ==
=== Levee bank at Bollon ===
A project to construct a levee bank across the highway on the western side of Bollon, at a cost of $1.8 million, was completed in June 2021.

== Roads of Strategic Importance upgrades ==
The Roads of Strategic Importance initiative, last updated in March 2022, includes the following projects for the Balonne Highway.

=== Corridor upgrade ===
A lead project to upgrade the Townsville to Roma corridor, including sections of the Carnarvon, Dawson, Gregory and Balonne Highways and surrounding state and council roads, at an estimated cost of $125 million, commenced construction of some work projects in 2020. Planning continues for other projects.

=== St George breakdown pad ===
A project to construct a breakdown pad on the Balonne Highway at St George at a cost of $2.4 million is planned to be completed by late 2022. This project is targeted for "early works" by the Queensland Government.

== Major intersections ==
| LGA | Location | km | mi | Destinations | Notes |
|---|---|---|---|---|---|
| Balonne | St George | 0 | 0.0 | Carnarvon Highway (State Route A55) north – Roma / south – Nindigully | Eastern end of Balonne Highway (State Route 49) |
| Balonne River | | 1.6 | 0.99 | Andrew Nixon Bridge | |
| Balonne | St George | 5.2 | 3.2 | Mitchell–St George Road – north – Mitchell | |
| Balonne | Bollon | 102 | 63 | Bollon–Dirranbandi Road – south – Dirranbandi | |
| Balonne | Bollon | 113 | 70 | Mitchell–Bollon Road – north – Mitchell | |
| Paroo | Nebine | 160 | 99 | Charleville–Bollon Road – north – Charleville | |
| Paroo | Cunnamulla | 288 | 179 | Mitchell Highway (State Route A71) north – Charleville / south – Bourke | Western end of Balonne Highway |
1.000 mi = 1.609 km; 1.000 km = 0.621 mi

== See also ==
- Highways in Australia
- List of highways in Queensland
