= Cunnamulla =

- Town
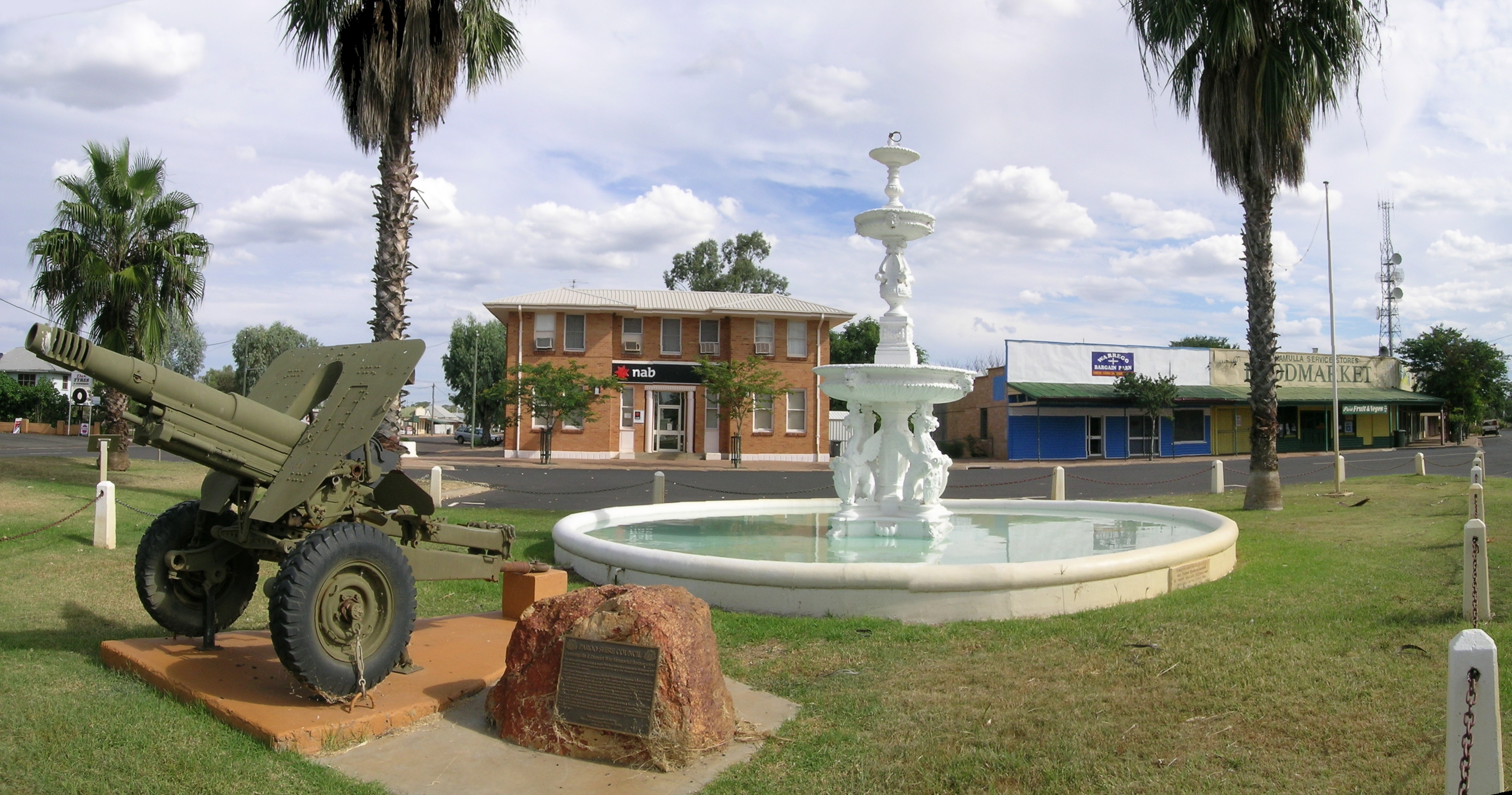
- Cunnamulla war memorial, 2010

- Interactive map of Cunnamulla
- Coordinates: 28.0702°S 145.6825°E
- Country: Australia
- State: Queensland
- LGA: Shire of Paroo
- Location: 199 km (124 mi) SSW of Charleville; 257 km (160 mi) N of Bourke; 293 km (182 mi) W of St George; 790 km (490 mi) W of Brisbane
- Established: 1868

Government
  - State electorate: Warrego
  - Federal division: Maranoa

Area
  - Total: 4,591.1 km^{2} (1,772.6 sq mi)
- Elevation: 189 m (620 ft)

Population
  - Total: 1,233 (2021 census)
  - Density: 0.26856/km^{2} (0.69558/sq mi)
- Time zone: UTC+10:00 (AEST)
- Postcode: 4490
- County: Wellington County, Queensland
- Mean max temp: 28.1 °C (82.6 °F)
- Mean min temp: 14.2 °C (57.6 °F)
- Annual rainfall: 376.2 mm (14.81 in)
Localities around Cunnamulla
| Humeburn | Humeburn | Coongoola |
| Eulo | Cunnamulla | Linden |
| Eulo | Cuttaburra; Tuen | Widgeegoara |

Cunnamulla (/kʌnəˈmʌlə/) is a town and a locality in the Shire of Paroo, Queensland, Australia. It is 199 kilometres (124 mi) south of Charleville, and approximately 750 kilometres (470 mi) west of the state capital, Brisbane. In the 2021 census, the locality of Cunnamulla had a population of 1,233.

== Geography ==
Cunnamulla lies on the Warrego River in South West Queensland within the Murray–Darling drainage basin. It flows from the north (Coongoola) through the town, which is in the centre of the locality, and exits to the south (Tuen).

The Mitchell Highway passes through the locality from north (Coongoola) to south (Tuen), while the Balonne Highway enters the location from the east (Linden). The two highways intersect in the town, which is located in the centre of the locality. The Bulloo Developmental Road starts in Cunnamulla and exits the locality to the west (Eulo).

Cunnamulla is the administrative centre for the Paroo Shire, which also includes the townships of Wyandra, Yowah and Eulo, and covers an area of 47,617 square kilometres (18,385 mi^{2}).

Major industries of the area are cattle, sheep and goat farming, along with tourism and opal mining.

== History ==
Gunya (also known as Kunya, Kunja, Kurnja) is an Australian Aboriginal language spoken by the Gunya people. The Gunya language region includes the landscape within the local government boundaries of the Paroo Shire Council, taking in Cunnamulla and extending north towards Augathella, east towards Bollon and west towards Thargomindah.

The original Indigenous inhabitants of the area were the Kunja. The first European explorer to arrive was Edmund Kennedy, whose expedition passed through the region in 1847. Kennedy's group noted fields of native grasses that appeared to be being cultivated like a wheat crop, but they only had limited interaction with the people who resided there.

Pastoralists arrived to take land from 1861 when squatter Alexander Keith Collins led an exploratory group through the region that had several skirmishes with the local Aboriginal people. Collins was later investigated for kidnapping two Aboriginal boys. By 1863, all of the land along the southern Warrego River had been acquired by pastoralists.

The town name of Cunnamulla is derived from the Cunnamullah cattle station established by Samuel Smith in 1863, which in turn is the Aboriginal name of a deep waterhole in the Warrego River.

A settlement arose here because there was a reliable waterhole where two major stock routes intersected. The town itself came into being in the late 19th century as a coach stop for Cobb and Co coaches. A town survey was conducted in 1868, the same year a courthouse was built. Cunnamulla Post Office opened on 1 March 1868.

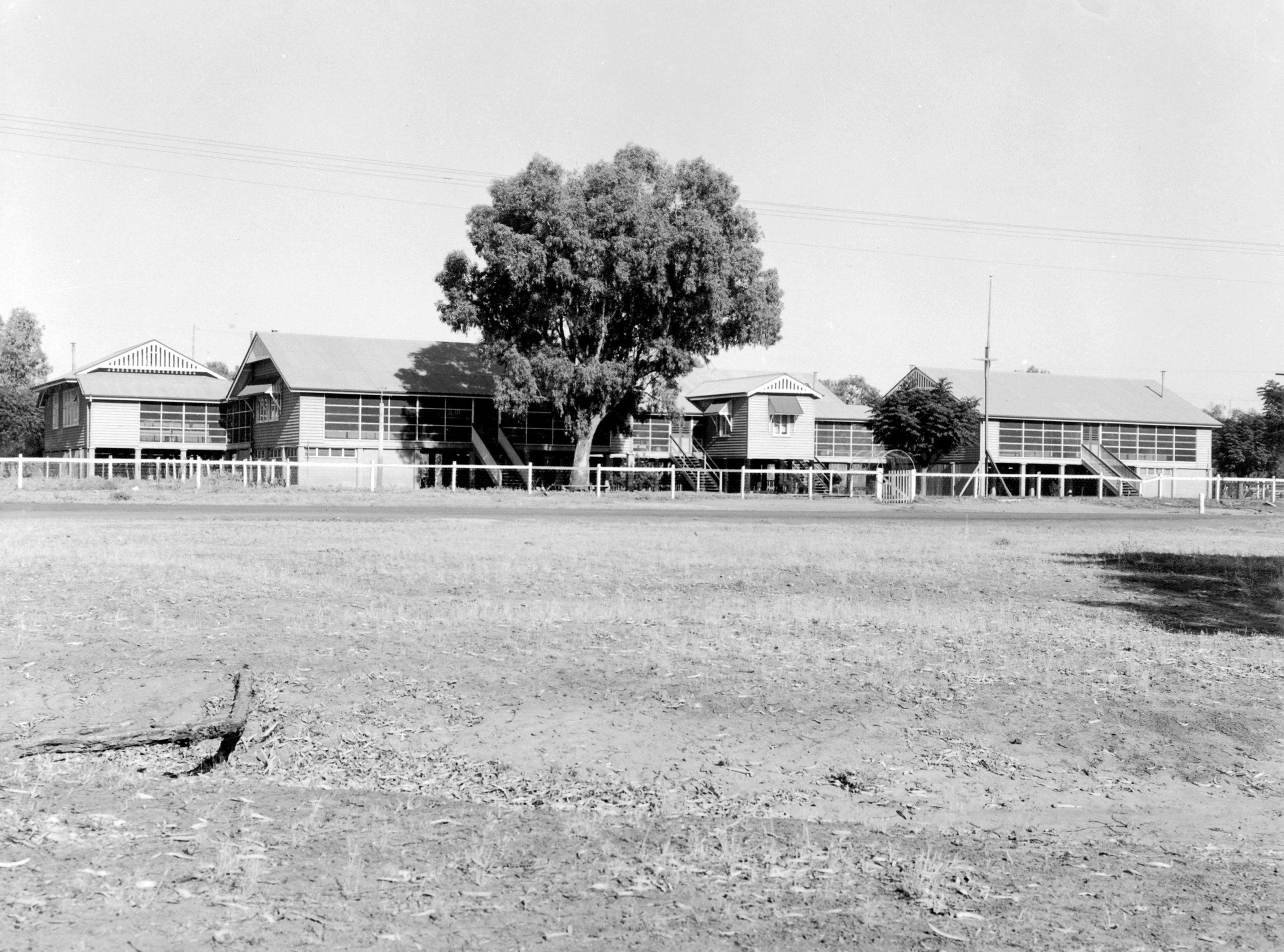
Cunnamulla State School, 1955

Cunnamulla Provisional School opened on 9 July 1877, becoming Cunnamulla State School in 1885.

From 1885 when the railway was constructed to Bourke in New South Wales, farmers at Cunnamulla and other parts of south-western Queensland began to send their wool to markets via Bourke rather than to Charleville, then the terminus of the Western railway line in Queensland, as the New South Wales government offered more competitive rail freight rates than the Queensland Government. Queensland Railway Commissioner James Thallon responded by negotiating with the Carrier's Union which carried goods to the Charleville railhead to make the cost of transporting the goods via Charleville more attractive. However, strikes by the carriers in support of the 1891 Australian shearers' strike meant that goods continued to be travel via New South Wales, further encouraged by new lower freight rates in New South Wales announced in June 1893. The Queensland Government responded the following month by introducing the Railway Border Tax Act which taxed wool and sheepskins crossing the border into New South Wales to make it too expensive to freight the wool via New South Wales. However, this could only be a temporary measure as the anticipated Federation of Australia would likely include free trade between the states of Australia removing the ability to tax goods at the border crossing. Therefore, on 3 December 1895, the Queensland Parliament approved the construction of the 121-mile (195 km) extension of the Western railway line from Charleville to Cunnamulla.

During the construction of the railway line, there was a dispute over the location of the railway station at Cunnamulla. The original proposal was for the station to be to the north of the town to be above the flood level rather than within the town centre as was usual practice. However, the railway chief engineer Henry Charles Stanley visited Cunnamulla and decided it would be better to place the station in the centre of the town as it would be more convenient and better positioned for crossing the Warrego River when the railway line was further extended. However, the disadvantage of the town centre site was that it would encroach on the town's cricket ground. The townsfolk were divided on the issue and many sent petitions to the government to demand one location or the other. The Queensland Parliament eventually decided to proceed with the original location north of the town. The railway line to Cunnamulla was opened on 10 October 1898. However, the hotel on the corner of John and Louise Streets in the centre of the town had already been named the Railway Hotel in anticipation of a town-centre station and retained that name until the 1970s, when it was renamed Trappers Inn.

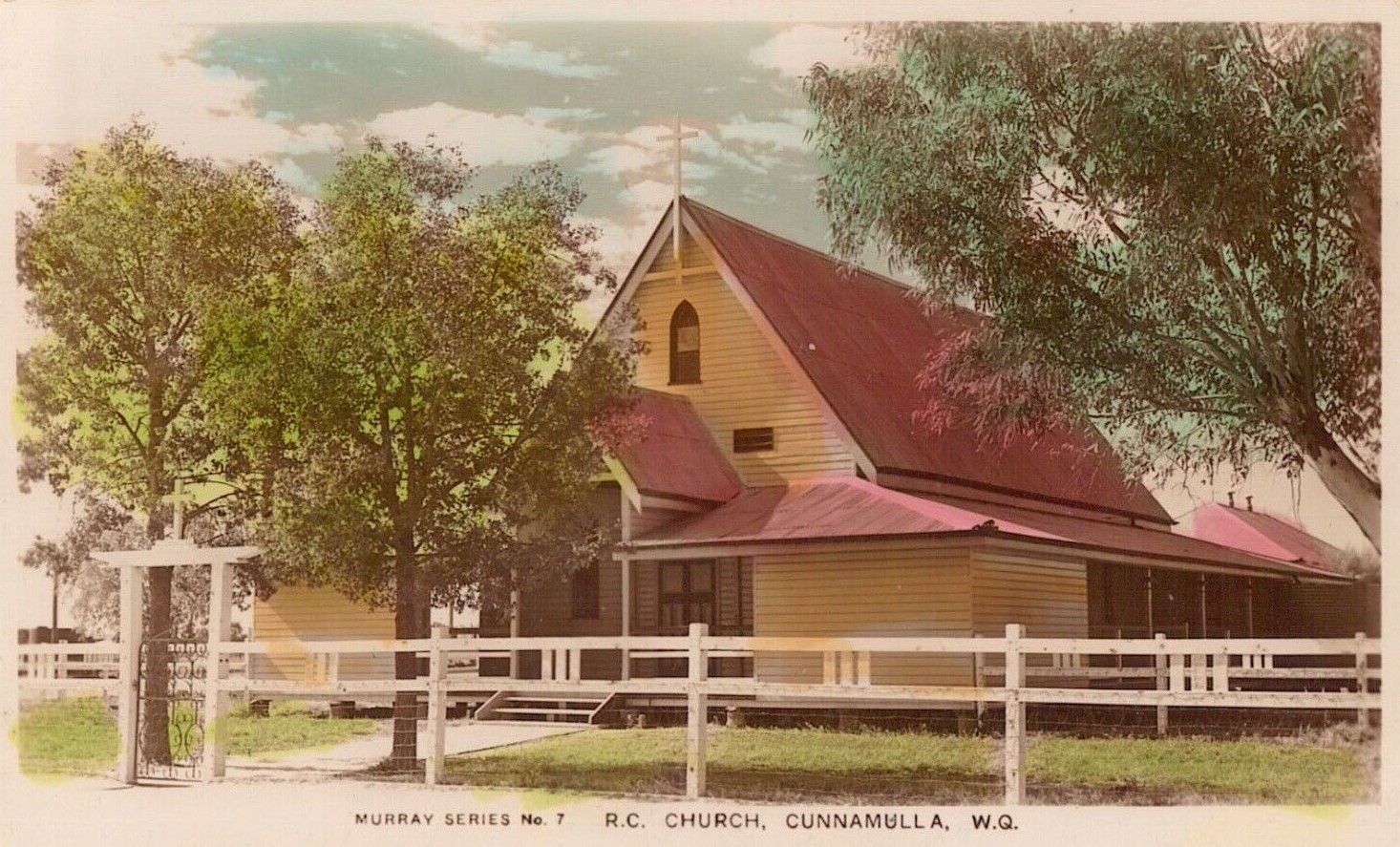
Catholic church, circa 1930s

Sacred Heart Catholic Church was opened officially opened on 23 May 1894 by Thomas Byrnes and dedicated by Father Corrigon, the parish priest. The building was 70 by 30 feet (21.3 by 9.1 m) and capable of seating about 250 people with 30 people in the organ loft. It was 40 feet (12 m) high, the tallest building in Cunnamulla. It was made from locally-grown cypress with finer-quality Warwick pine used for the floor and ceiling. It was the first church in Cunnamulla. The 1894 church building was demolished in 1971 to be replaced by the current church building which opened in 1972.

The foundation stone for an Anglican church was laid in January 1896 by Christopher Francis, the police magistrate. The church was opened on Saturday 20 June 1896 by Bishop Jack Stretch. The bishop was injured on his way to Cunnamulla, as he shot at a turkey from his carriage, frightening the horses, resulting in a crash with a tree stump, but was still able to perform the ceremony.

The Bush Brotherhood of St Paul has provided pastoral care to Cunnamulla since 1905.

The Sacred Heart Primary School was opened in 1915 by the Sisters of Mercy.

In 1970, Queen Elizabeth II, the Duke of Edinburgh and Princess Anne toured Australia including Queensland. The Queensland tour began on Sunday 12 April when the royal yacht HMY Britannia entered Moreton Bay at Caloundra, sailing into Newstead Wharf. Princess Anne accepted an invitation to spend three days on a working sheep station in south-west Queensland. She flew to Cunnamulla on 14 April, travelling 47 miles (76 km) by road to ‘Talbarea Station’ unaccompanied. Princess Anne arrived in Cunnamulla in a government jet a little ahead of schedule. She travelled around the district in a maroon Rolls-Royce which was unloaded from the back of a Royal Australian Air Force transport aircraft. Princess Anne was given a demonstration of sheep shearing and wool classing on the working property and was accompanied on a horse ride during her stay.

In 1999, the Queensland Department of Aboriginal and Torres Strait Islander Policy and Development reported that Cunnamulla's indigenous community suffered from a high level of domestic violence stemming from an over reliance by the police and the courts on punishment and detention to deal with Indigenous offenders.

The Cunnamulla library underwent a major refurbishment in 2013.

=== Flooding ===
The town has experienced major flooding in 1990, 1997, 2010 and 2012. The 1990 flood set a record for the Warrego River at 10.15 metres (33 ft 4 in). In 2008, the Australian Defence Force was deployed to assist in flood preparations. An 11 m (36 ft) high levee protects the town.

== Demographics ==
In the 2016 census, the locality of Cunnamulla had a population of 1,140 people. Aboriginal and Torres Strait Islander people made up 37.2% of the population. 88.7% of people were born in Australia and 91.5% of people spoke only English at home. The most common responses for religion were Catholic (34.5%), Anglican (27.8%), and No Religion (16.4%).

In the 2021 census, the locality of Cunnamulla had a population of 1,233 people. Aboriginal and Torres Strait Islander people made up 44.4% of the population. 88.6% of people were born in Australia and 91.9% of people spoke only English at home. The most common responses for religion were No Religion (33.4%), Catholic (29.2%), and Anglican (18.8%).

== Heritage listings ==
Cunnamulla has a number of heritage-listed sites, including:

- Former Invincible Theatre, Jane Street
- Cunnamulla War Memorial Fountain, John Street (28.0679°S 145.6838°E)
- Paroo Shire Honour Board, Civic Centre, Louise Street (28.0703°S 145.6818°E)
- The Robbers Tree, Stockyard Street (28.074°S 145.6817°E)
- Cunnamulla Post Office, Stockyard Street

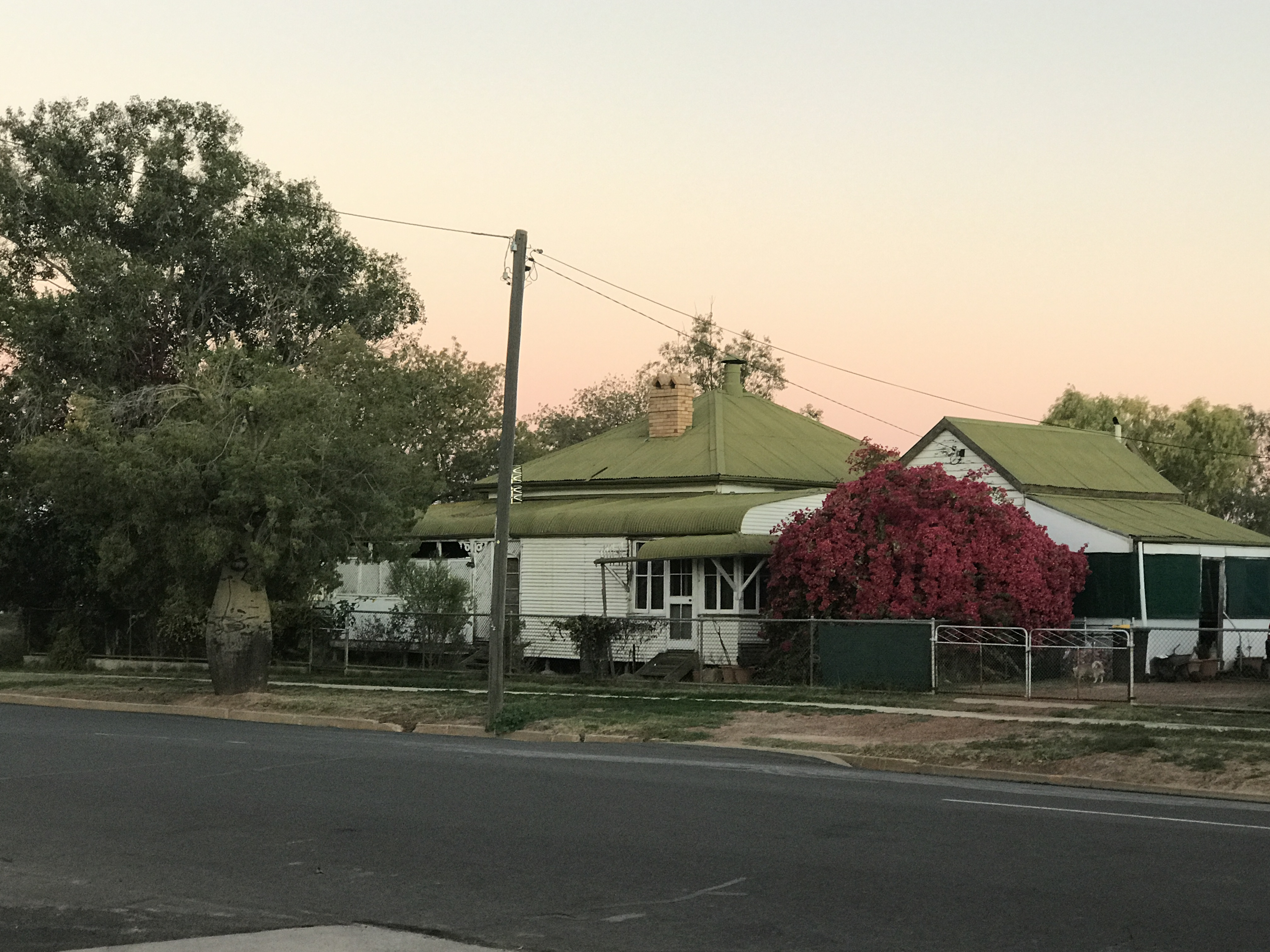
House in Emma Street, Cunnamulla, 2019

== Education ==
Cunnamulla State School is a government primary and secondary (Early Childhood to Year 12) school for boys and girls at 17 Francis Street (28.0711°S 145.6793°E). In 2017, the school had an enrolment of 98 students with 17 teachers (16 full-time equivalent) and 20 non-teaching staff (14 full-time equivalent).

Sacred Heart Primary School is a Catholic primary (Preparatory to Year 6) school for boys and girls at 46 John Street (28.0725°S 145.6832°E). In 2017, the school had an enrolment of 84 students with 8 teachers (7 full-time equivalent) and 5 non-teaching staff (4 full-time equivalent).

== Facilities ==
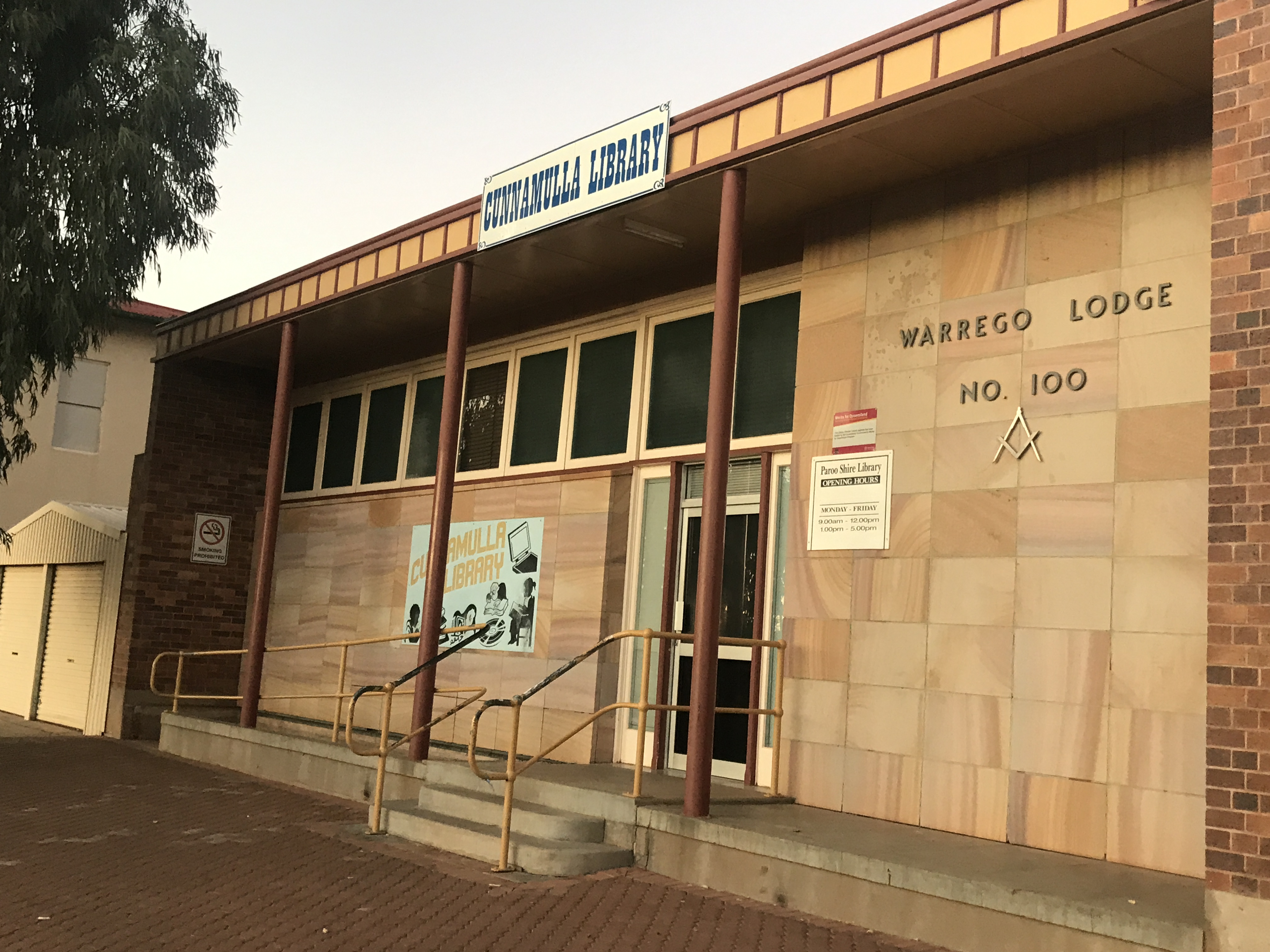
Cunnamulla library, 2019

Cunnamulla has a magistrates court, a primary health care facility and a fire station.

== Amenities ==
The Paroo Shire Council operates a public library in Cunnamulla at 16 John Street.

St Albans Anglican Church is at 23 Emma Street.

Cunnamulla has a public swimming pool, showground, and racecourse.

Cunnamulla had a rugby league team called the Cunnamulla Rams. In 2022, they merged with Charleville Comets to form the Western Ringers, who play in the Roma District Rugby League.

== Attractions ==
There are two museums and a tourist information centre. The town has two caravan parks, one at the Warrego Riverside and the other within the town boundaries.

== Cultural references ==
The climax of the 1888 novel Robbery Under Arms by Rolf Boldrewood takes place around the town of Cunnamulla and at a fictional location north of the town called Murrynebone Creek.

Cunnamulla was the subject of a 2000 documentary film of the same name by Dennis O'Rourke, in which he followed several members of the community as they went about their daily lives. The film earned $132,485 at the Australian box office.

Cunnamulla is the main setting for Henry Lawson's short story "The Hypnotised Township" from his anthology The Rising of the Court, and Other Sketches in Prose and Verse. The song "Cunnamulla Fella", written by Stan Coster and sung by Slim Dusty, is commemorated by a statue in the town centre that was unveiled in 2005, when the eponymous Cunnamulla Fella Festival was established.

== Climate ==
Cunnamulla experiences a hot semi-arid climate (Köppen: BSh), with very hot summers and mild winters with occasional frost. Average maxima range from 36.2 °C (97.2 °F) in January to 18.9 °C (66.0 °F) in July. Annual precipitation is rather low, averaging 374.8 mm (14.76 in), with a summer maximum. The town is expectedly sunny, with 184.8 clear days and only 67.6 cloudy days annually. Extreme temperatures have ranged from 47.2 °C (117.0 °F) on 3 January 2014 to −2.2 °C (28.0 °F) on 26 June 1971 and 26 July 1968.

Climate data for Cunnamulla (28°04'12"S, 145°40'48"E, 189 m AMSL) (1879–2024 normals, extremes 1957–2024)
| Month | Jan | Feb | Mar | Apr | May | Jun | Jul | Aug | Sep | Oct | Nov | Dec | Year |
|---|---|---|---|---|---|---|---|---|---|---|---|---|---|
| Record high °C (°F) | 47.2 (117.0) | 45.6 (114.1) | 43.3 (109.9) | 37.3 (99.1) | 32.7 (90.9) | 30.4 (86.7) | 31.8 (89.2) | 36.8 (98.2) | 40.7 (105.3) | 42.0 (107.6) | 45.4 (113.7) | 46.2 (115.2) | 47.2 (117.0) |
| Mean daily maximum °C (°F) | 36.2 (97.2) | 35.0 (95.0) | 32.5 (90.5) | 28.1 (82.6) | 23.0 (73.4) | 19.4 (66.9) | 18.9 (66.0) | 21.5 (70.7) | 25.7 (78.3) | 29.8 (85.6) | 32.9 (91.2) | 35.3 (95.5) | 28.2 (82.7) |
| Mean daily minimum °C (°F) | 22.4 (72.3) | 21.8 (71.2) | 19.0 (66.2) | 14.3 (57.7) | 9.9 (49.8) | 6.9 (44.4) | 5.8 (42.4) | 7.2 (45.0) | 10.8 (51.4) | 14.9 (58.8) | 18.2 (64.8) | 20.9 (69.6) | 14.3 (57.8) |
| Record low °C (°F) | 13.0 (55.4) | 11.5 (52.7) | 4.4 (39.9) | 4.6 (40.3) | −1.1 (30.0) | −2.2 (28.0) | −2.2 (28.0) | −1.0 (30.2) | 2.0 (35.6) | 3.3 (37.9) | 7.8 (46.0) | 11.5 (52.7) | −2.2 (28.0) |
| Average precipitation mm (inches) | 48.2 (1.90) | 49.9 (1.96) | 41.7 (1.64) | 26.5 (1.04) | 29.3 (1.15) | 25.9 (1.02) | 22.5 (0.89) | 17.2 (0.68) | 18.5 (0.73) | 25.5 (1.00) | 30.7 (1.21) | 38.6 (1.52) | 374.8 (14.76) |
| Average precipitation days (≥ 1.0 mm) | 3.6 | 3.3 | 3.1 | 2.0 | 2.5 | 2.9 | 2.5 | 2.0 | 2.2 | 3.0 | 3.4 | 3.3 | 33.8 |
| Average afternoon relative humidity (%) | 29 | 32 | 32 | 34 | 40 | 44 | 40 | 32 | 26 | 25 | 25 | 24 | 32 |
| Average dew point °C (°F) | 11.8 (53.2) | 12.7 (54.9) | 10.5 (50.9) | 8.3 (46.9) | 7.0 (44.6) | 5.7 (42.3) | 3.5 (38.3) | 2.5 (36.5) | 2.8 (37.0) | 4.5 (40.1) | 6.7 (44.1) | 8.2 (46.8) | 7.0 (44.6) |
Source: Bureau of Meteorology (1879–2024 normals, extremes 1957–2024)

== See also ==
- Cunnamulla Airport
