= Walhallow, Queensland =

Walhallow
- Suburb
- Interactive map of Walhallow
- Coordinates: 26.3486°S 148.2513°E
- Country: Australia
- State: Queensland
- LGA: Maranoa Region
- Location: 38.9 km (24.2 mi) NE of Mitchell; 83.3 km (51.8 mi) SW of Bymount; 98.7 km (61.3 mi) WNW of Roma; 435 km (270 mi) WNW of Toowoomba; 561 km (349 mi) WNW of Brisbane

Government
  - State electorate: Warrego
  - Federal division: Maranoa

Area
  - Total: 726.8 km^{2} (280.6 sq mi)

Population
  - Total: 31 (2021 census)
  - Density: 0.0427/km^{2} (0.1105/sq mi)
- Time zone: UTC+10:00 (AEST)
- Postcode: 4462
Suburbs around Walhallow
Kilmorey Falls	Kilmorey Falls	Kilmorey Falls
Mitchell	Walhallow	Orallo
Mitchell	Amby; Eurella	Mount Bindango

Walhallow is a rural locality in the Maranoa Region, Queensland, Australia. In the 2021 census, Walhallow had a population of 31 people.

Walhallow's postcode is 4462.

== Geography ==
The Western railway line enters the locality from the south (Amby) and forms the south-western boundary of the locality, exiting to the south-west (Mitchell). The Warrego Highway runs immediately north and parallel with the railway line.

Taboonbay State Forest is in the north of the locality. Apart from this protected area, the land use is predominantly grazing on native vegetation with some crop growing.

== Demographics ==
In the 2016 census, Walhallow had a population of 10 people.

In the 2021 census, Walhallow had a population of 31 people.

== Education ==
There are no schools in Walhallow. The nearest government primary schools are Mitchell State School in neighbouring Mitchell to the south-west, Bymount East State School in Bymount to the north-east, and Roma State College in Roma to the south-west. The nearest government secondary schools are Mitchell State School (to Year 10) and Roma State College (to Year 12). There is a Catholic primary school in Mitchell and a Catholic primary and secondary school in Roma. However, for some students in Walhallow, these schools may be too distant and the alternatives are distance education and boarding school.
