= Orallo, Queensland =

Orallo
- Suburb
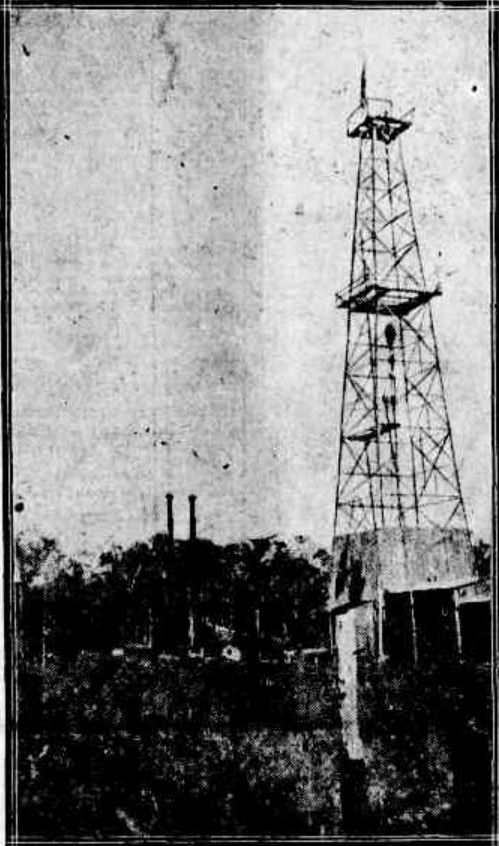
- The works at Orallo bore where oil was discovered, 1924

- Interactive map of Orallo
- Coordinates: 26.2891°S 148.5119°E
- Country: Australia
- State: Queensland
- LGA: Maranoa Region
- Location: 42.2 km (26.2 mi) NW of Roma; 393 km (244 mi) WNW of Toowoomba; 520 km (320 mi) WNW of Brisbane

Government
  - State electorate: Warrego
  - Federal division: Maranoa

Area
  - Total: 752.6 km^{2} (290.6 sq mi)

Population
  - Total: 46 (2021 census)
  - Density: 0.0611/km^{2} (0.1583/sq mi)
- Time zone: UTC+10:00 (AEST)
- Postcode: 4455
Suburbs around Orallo
Kilmorey Falls	Cornwall	Bymount
Walhallow	Orallo	Eumamurrin
Mount Bindango	Bungeworgorai	Euthulla

Orallo is a rural locality in the Maranoa Region, Queensland, Australia. In the 2021 census, Orallo had a population of 46 people.

== Geography ==
The land use in the locality is grazing on native vegetation with a small amount of crop growing.

== History ==
In 1911, a railway line from Roma to Orallo was proposed, being the first stage of the Injune railway line. Construction commenced in November 1914. The line to Orallo was officially opened on 4 May 1917 by Harry Coyne, the Minister for Railways. He also turned the first sod for the railway line's extension to Injune Creek. There were numerous railway stations within the locality including (from north to south):

- Alicker railway station (26.1572°S 148.5030°E)
- Hunterton railway station (26.2472°S 148.5102°E), named after local politician John McEwan Hunter
- Oralla railway station (26.27258°S 148.54416°E)
- Moorta railway station (26.3005°S 148.5747°E)
- Eumina (26.3091°S 148.5994°E), an Aboriginal name meaning place of rest
- Oogara railway station (26.3277°S 148.6302°E)
- Nareeten railway station (26.3713°S 148.6544°E), an Aboriginal name, meaning wild flower

In 1916, 113 allotments were offered for sale in the Town of Orallo near the Orallo railway station.

The locality's name Orallo comes from the Orallo railway station name, assigned by the Queensland Railways Department on 11 November 1915, reportedly an Aboriginal word meaning shade.

A school for Orallo was proposed in 1917. Orallo Provisional School opened circa 1918. The building was expanded in 1919. On 1 October 1922, it became Orallo State School on a 1.5-acre (0.61 ha) reserve. It closed in 1927. It was on the south-western side of Orallo Road (approx 26.26951°S 148.54150°E).

In 1924, oil was found in Orallo.

In 1925, it was proposed to build a school next to the Hunterton railway station. Approval was given to erect Hunterton State School in June 1926. Hunterton State School opened circa March 1927. It closed circa 1938.

Orallo School of Arts Hall opened circa June 1928.

The railway line was closed at the end of 1966.

== Demographics ==
In the 2016 census, Orallo had a population of 41 people.

In the 2021 census, Orallo had a population of 46 people.

== Education ==
There are no school in Orallo. The nearest government primary schools are Bymont East State School in neighbouring Bymount to the north-east, Roma State College in Roma to the south-east, and Mitchell State School in Mitchell to the south-west. The nearest government secondary schools are Injune State School (to Year 10) in Injune to the north and Roma State College (to Year 12). However, some parts of Oralla are too distant from these secondary schools for a daily commute; the alternatives are distance education and boarding school.
