= Eumamurrin, Queensland =

Eumamurrin
- Suburb
- Interactive map of Eumamurrin
- Coordinates: 26.1775°S 148.8238°E
- Country: Australia
- State: Queensland
- LGA: Maranoa Region
- Location: 43.2 km (26.8 mi) N of Roma; 394 km (245 mi) NW of Toowoomba; 522 km (324 mi) WNW of Brisbane

Government
  - State electorate: Warrego
  - Federal division: Maranoa

Area
  - Total: 947.7 km^{2} (365.9 sq mi)

Population
  - Total: 97 (2021 census)
  - Density: 0.1024/km^{2} (0.2651/sq mi)
- Time zone: UTC+10:00 (AEST)
- Postcode: 4455
Suburbs around Eumamurrin
Gunnewin	Highland Plains	Pony Hills
Bymount	Eumamurrin	Durham Downs
Orallo	Euthulla	Mooga

Eumamurrin is a rural locality in the Maranoa Region, Queensland, Australia. In the 2021 census, Eumamurrin had a population of 97 people.

== Geography ==
The Roma-Taroom Road bounds the locality to the south-east.

The Carnarvon Highway enters the locality from the west (Bymount) and exits to the south (Euthella).

There are 3 disconnected sections of the Gubberamunda State Forest in the south of the locality. Apart from these protected areas, the land use is predominantly grazing on native vegetation.

Eumamurrin has the following mountains:

- Mount Eumamurrin (26.1464°S 148.6936°E) 520 metres (1,710 ft)
- Mount Beagle (26.3741°S 148.7000°E) 461 metres (1,512 ft)

== Demographics ==
In the 2016 census, Eumamurrin had a population of 85 people.

In the 2021 census, Eumamurrin had a population of 97 people.

== Education ==
There are no schools in Eumamurrin. The nearest government primary schools are Bymount East State School in neighbouring Bymount to the west and Roma State College in Roma to the south. The nearest government secondary schools are Injune State School (to Year 10) in Injune to the north-west and Roma State College (to Year 12) in Roma to the south.
