= Amby, Queensland =

Amby
- Town
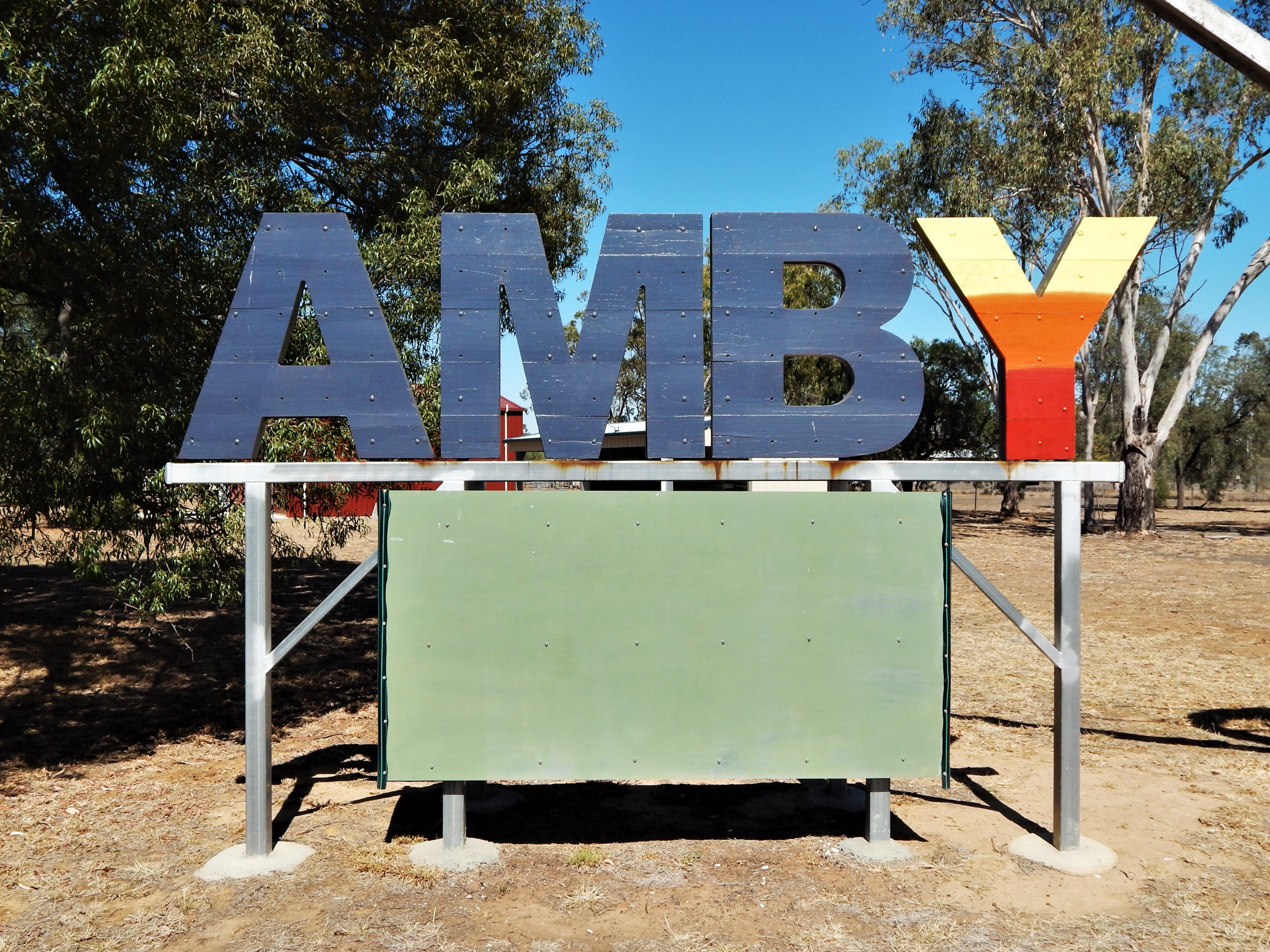
- Sign located at the entrance to Amby

- Interactive map of Amby
- Coordinates: 26.5477°S 148.1872°E
- Country: Australia
- State: Queensland
- LGA: Maranoa Region
- Location: 202.6 km (125.9 mi) SE of Charleville; 24.6 km (15.3 mi) SE of Mitchell; 63.7 km (39.6 mi) W of Roma; 414 km (257 mi) WNW of Toowoomba; 542 km (337 mi) WNW of Brisbane

Government
  - State electorate: Warrego
  - Federal division: Maranoa

Area
  - Total: 199.0 km^{2} (76.8 sq mi)
- Elevation: 340 m (1,120 ft)

Population
  - Total: 49 (2021 census)
  - Density: 0.2462/km^{2} (0.638/sq mi)
- Time zone: UTC+10:00 (AEST)
- Postcode: 4462
Localities around Amby
Mitchell	Walhallow	Walhallow
Mitchell	Amby	Eurella
Eurella	Eurella	Eurella

Amby is a rural town and locality in the Maranoa Region, Queensland, Australia. In the 2021 census, the locality of Amby had a population of 49 people.

== Geography ==
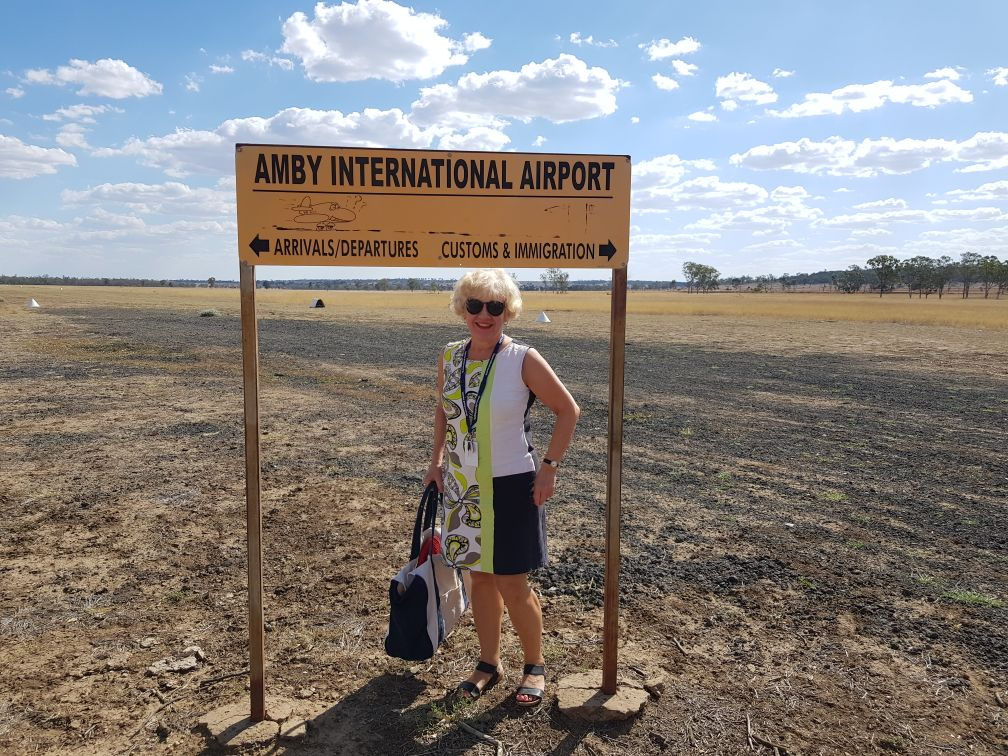
The town's unregistered and unsealed (1,200 m) landing ground is located 3 kilometers to the south on the western side of Springfield Road (26.5749°S 148.1774°E). Elevation 1,128 feet.

The town is roughly in the centre of the locality. Amby Creek flows through the location from north to south, passing immediately to the east of the town. Amby Creek is eventually a tributary of the Maranoa River.

The Warrego Highway passes through the locality from east to west, passing through the main street of the town. The Western railway line also passes through the locality from east to west, with two railway stations in the locality:

- Amby railway station, serving the town (26.5497°S 148.1866°E)
- Bongo railway station, to the north-west of the town (26.5345°S 148.1472°E)

The land use is predominantly grazing on native vegetation with some crop growing and quarrying. Amby is situated near lava flows from ancient volcanoes and local quarries extract basalt for use in road building, railway ballast, and a range of other construction uses.

== History ==
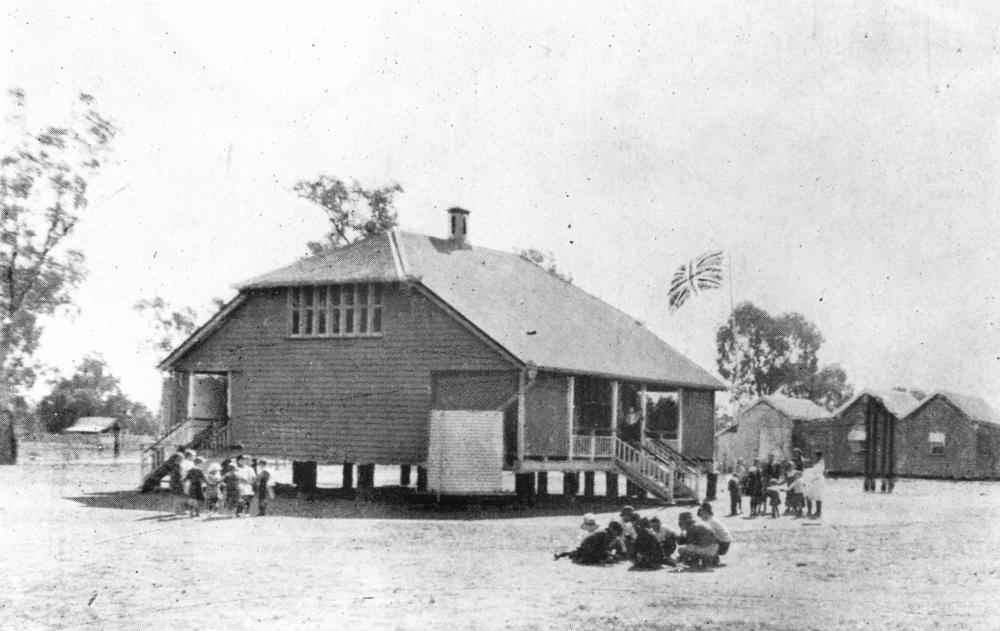
Amby State School, circa 1921

Amby takes its name from the Amby Creek; Amby is possibly a word meaning "little girl" in Kogai dialect of Mandandanji language.

The Amby Downs pastoral station is believed to have been established before 1860.

The Western railway line was surveyed in 1879. The railway was not originally intended to pass through this area, but flooding resulted in a change of plans to put a long trestle bridge over Amby Creek. Amby railway station was built in 1884 and a goods yard established in 1885, with passenger services commencing in 1890.

A postal receiving office opened at Amby around 1883, and became a post office around 1900; it continues to operate out of the Amby Store.

Amby Provisional School opened on 26 February 1894 and became Amby State School in 1901. It closed on 19 September 1997. The school was in School Street (26.5469°S 148.1858°E).

Freeman's Waterhole Provisional School opened on 8 March 1920. In 1923 it was renamed Hampstead Provisional School. It closed on 30 May 1930.

St Barnabas' Anglican Church was opened circa November 1955 by Ian Shevill, the Anglican Bishop of North Queensland. It was built of timber and could seat 70 people. It has now closed but the building is still extant. It is on the northern corner of School Street and Queen Street (26.548119°S 148.1857°E).

== Demographics ==
In the 2011 census, the locality of Amby had a population of 139 people.

In the 2016 census, the locality of Amby had a population of 86 people.

In the 2021 census, the locality of Amby had a population of 49 people.

== Economy ==
There are a number of homesteads in the locality:

- Amby Downs in the north-east of the locality (26.5148°S 148.2302°E)
- Huntington (26.5670°S 148.1820°E)
- Richland Hill (26.5090°S 148.1314°E)
- Spring Hill (26.5532°S 148.1621°E)
- Turtle Grove (26.5125°S 148.1712°E)

== Education ==
There are no schools in Amby. The nearest government school is Mitchell State School in neighbouring Mitchell to the west which provides primary education and secondary education to Year 10. For secondary education to Year 12, the nearest government school is Roma State College in Roma to the east, but it is sufficiently distant that distance education and boarding school are the alternatives.

== Amenities ==
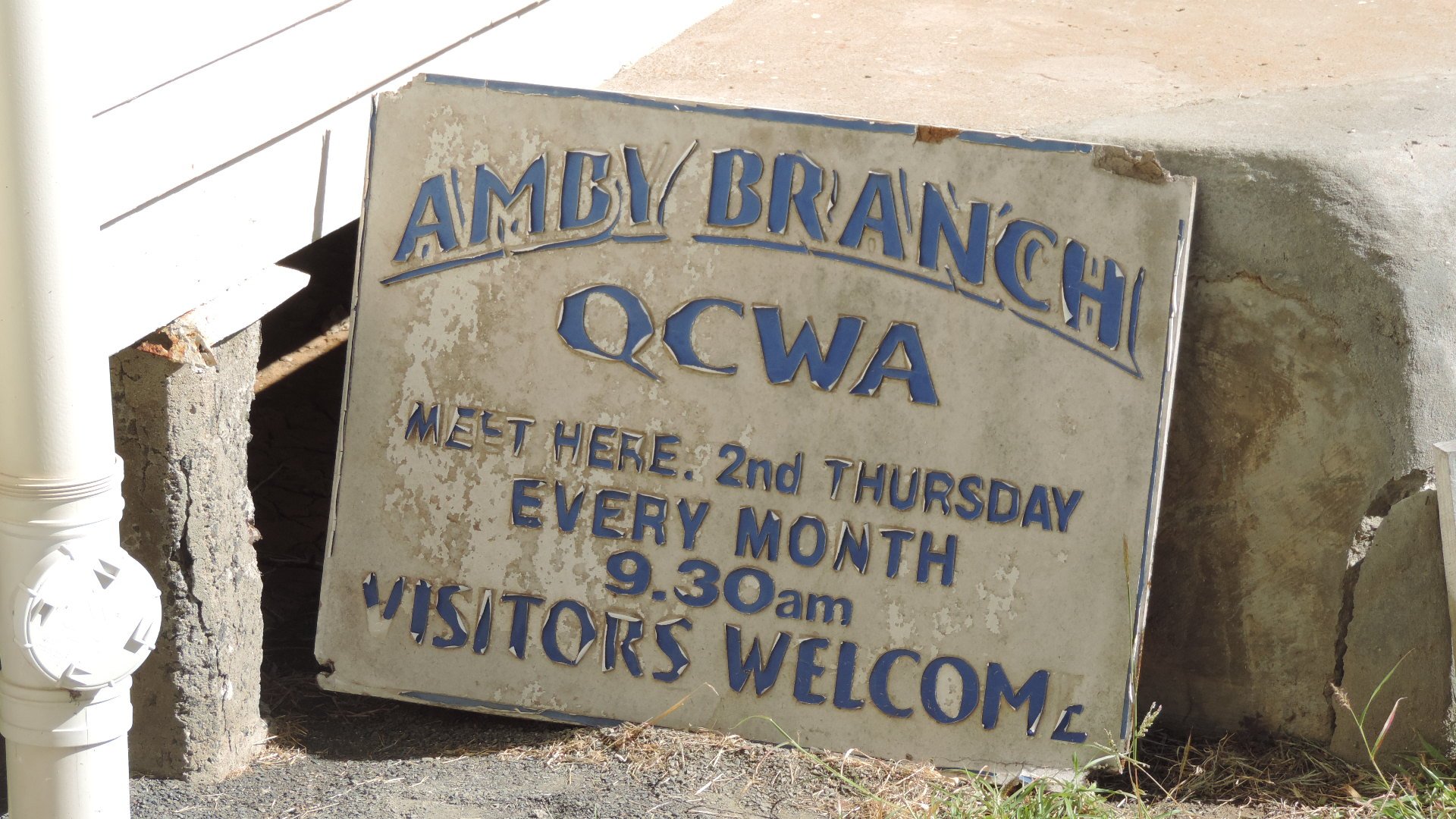
Signage for Amby branch of the Queensland Country Women's association, Booringa Shire Hall, 2019

The Amby branch of the Queensland Country Women's Association meets in the Booringa Shire Hall.

== Facilities ==
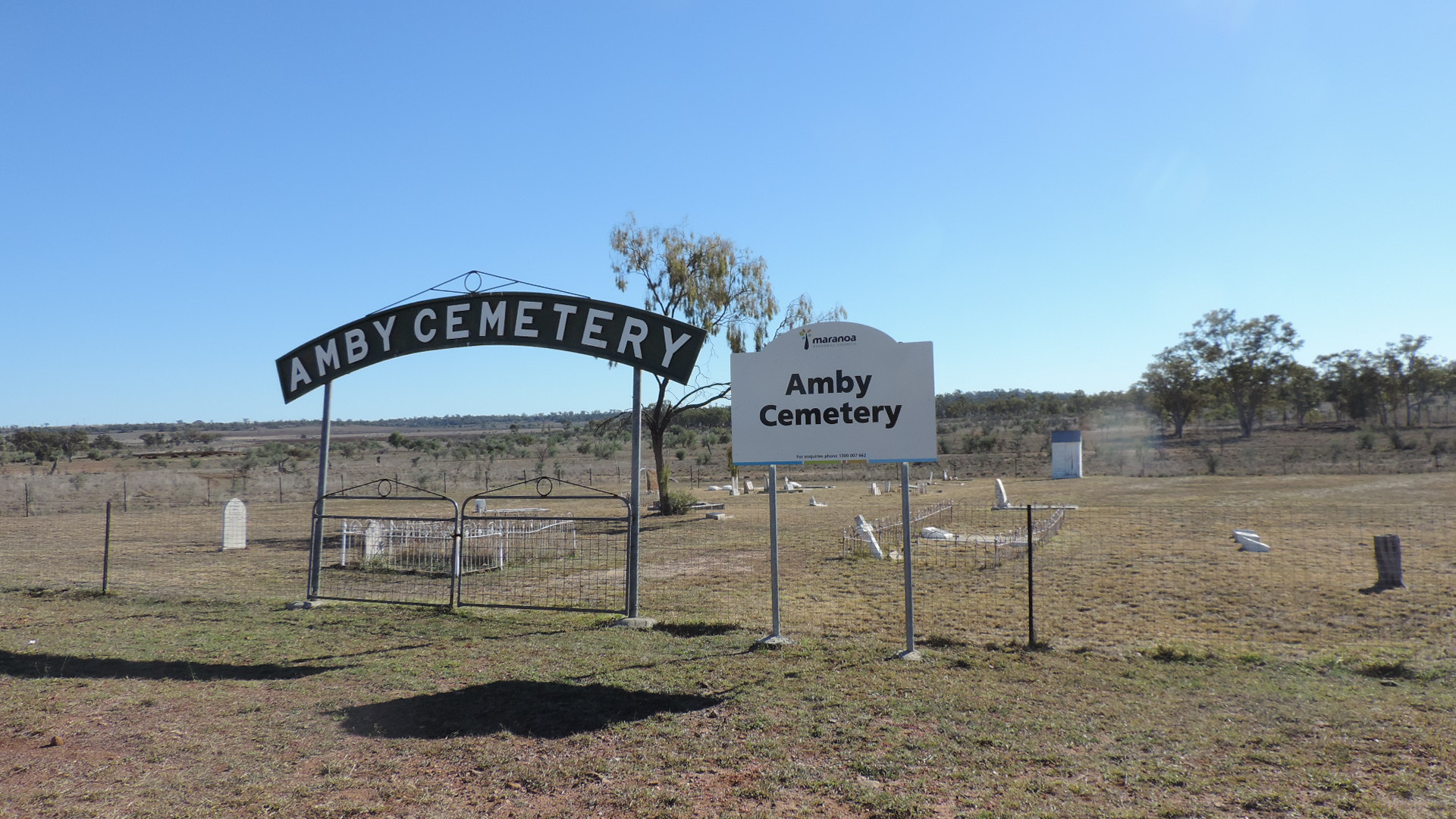
Amby Cemetery, 2019

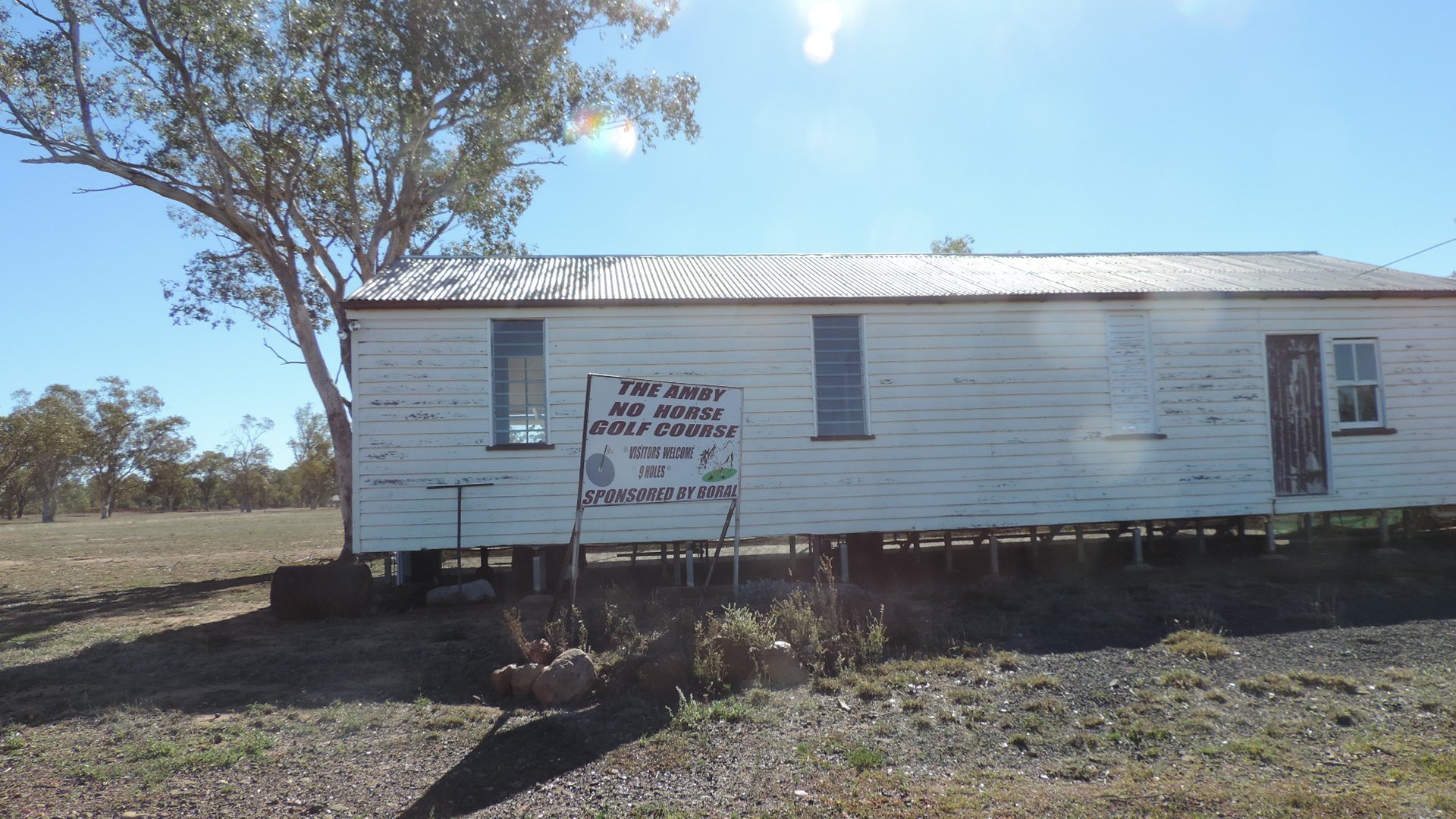
Clubhouse at the "No Horse Golf Course", 2019

Facilities in the town include:

- Amby Fire Station (26.5480°S 148.1877°E)
- Amby Monumental Cemetery on the Spring Hill Access road (26.5509°S 148.1783°E)
- Amby "No Horse" Golf course on the Spring Hill Access road (26.5526°S 148.1852°E)

== Notable residents ==
- Robert Dunsmure, Member of the Queensland Legislative Assembly for Maranoa
