= Kilmorey Falls, Queensland =

Kilmorey Falls
- Suburb
- Interactive map of Kilmorey Falls
- Coordinates: 26.1063°S 148.1991°E
- Country: Australia
- State: Queensland
- LGA: Maranoa Region
- Location: 59.4 km (36.9 mi) NE of Mitchel; 106 km (66 mi) NW of Roma; 117 km (73 mi) SW of Injune; 585 km (364 mi) WNW of Brisbane

Government
  - State electorate: Warrego
  - Federal division: Maranoa

Area
  - Total: 1,139.8 km^{2} (440.1 sq mi)
- Elevation: 390–830 m (1,280–2,720 ft)

Population
  - Total: 23 (2021 census)
  - Density: 0.0202/km^{2} (0.0523/sq mi)
- Time zone: UTC+10:00 (AEST)
- Postcode: 4465
Suburbs around Kilmorey Falls
| Forestvale | Womblebank | Mount Hutton |
| Forestvale | Kilmorey Falls | Cornwall |
| Mitchell | Walhallow | Orallo |

Kilmorey Falls is a rural locality in the Maranoa Region, Queensland, Australia. In the 2021 census, Kilmorey Falls had a population of 23 people.

Kilmorey Falls' postcode is 4465.

== Geography ==
The locality is bounded to the north-east by the Great Dividing Range. The terrain is mountainous in the north-east up to 830 metres (2,720 ft) above sea level, undulating generally through the locality but falling in elevation generally toward the south down to 390 metres (1,280 ft).

The Waroonga State Forest is in the south-east of the locality (26.2054°S 148.1256°E) and Walhallow State Forest in the east (26.1937°S 148.4106°E). Apart from these protected areas, the predominant land use is grazing on native vegetation with a small amount of crop growing in the south.

== History ==
The locality was officially named and bounded on 28 March 2002.

== Demographics ==
In the 2016 census, Kilmorey Falls had "no people or a very low population".

In the 2021 census, Kilmorey Falls had a population of 23 people.

== Economy ==
There are a number of homesteads in the locality:

- Alcurah (26.1224°S 148.3247°E)
- Claravale (26.1444°S 148.1286°E)
- Eastern Creek (26.2258°S 148.0780°E)
- Gap Plains (26.3365°S 148.1281°E)
- Glenloch (26.1224°S 148.3843°E)
- Katanga (26.1898°S 148.2015°E)
- Kilmorey (26.0750°S 148.1591°E)
- Mercura (26.0536°S 148.1614°E)
- Mountain View (26.1307°S 148.1650°E)
- Pinnacle (26.1737°S 148.4062°E)
- Ventura (26.1074°S 148.2940°E)
- Westwood (26.3149°S 148.0385°E)

== Education ==
There are no schools in Kilmorey Falls. The nearest government primary schools are Mitchell State School in neighbouring Mitchell to the south-west and Injune State School in Injune to the north-east. Both of these schools also provide secondary schooling to Year 10. There are no schools providing education to Year 12 available nearby with the nearest government school being Roma State College in Roma to the south-east (over 100 km away). Distance education and boarding schools are the alternatives.
