= Muckadilla, Queensland =

Muckadilla
- Town
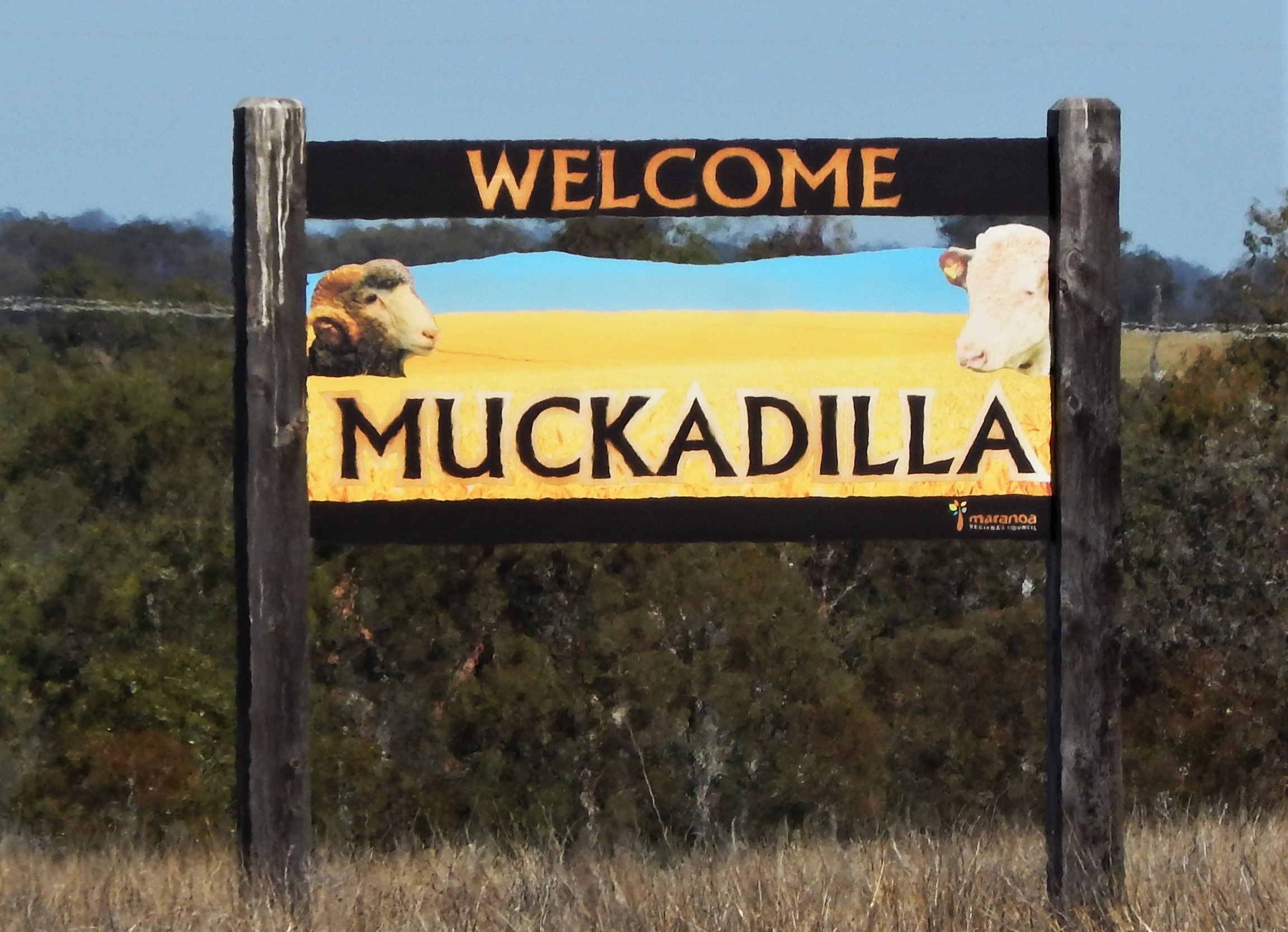
- Welcome sign on Warrego Highway

- Interactive map of Muckadilla
- Coordinates: 26.5863°S 148.3866°E
- Country: Australia
- State: Queensland
- LGA: Maranoa Region
- Location: 41.4 km (25.7 mi) W of Roma; 392 km (244 mi) WNW of Toowoomba; 519 km (322 mi) WNW of Brisbane

Government
  - State electorate: Warrego
  - Federal division: Maranoa

Area
  - Total: 241.8 km^{2} (93.4 sq mi)

Population
  - Total: 38 (2021 census)
  - Density: 0.1572/km^{2} (0.407/sq mi)
- Time zone: UTC+10:00 (AEST)
- Postcode: 4461
Localities around Muckadilla
Eurella	Mount Bindango	Mount Bindango
Eurella	Muckadilla	Mount Abundance
Eurella	Mount Abundance	Mount Abundance

Muckadilla is a rural town and locality in the Maranoa Region, Queensland, Australia. In the 2021 census, the locality of Muckadilla had a population of 38 people.

== Geography ==
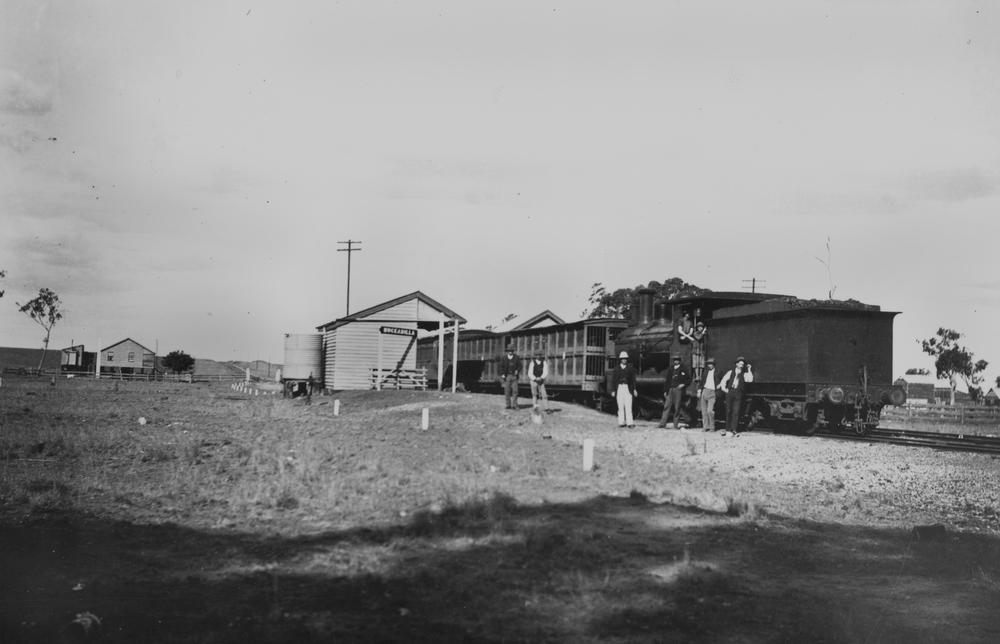
Muckadilla railway station, circa 1920

The town lies in the northern part of the locality. The Western railway line passes through the locality from east to west. The town is serviced by the Muckadilla railway station immediately to the north of the town. The Warrego Highway passes from east to west through the town, mostly being parallel immediately south of the railway line.

Muckadilla Creek flows from Mount Bindango to the north down to the south-east of Muckadilla to Mount Abundance, passing just west of the town. The creek becomes Cogoon River and then is a tributary of the Balonne River. Colonial surveyor and explorer Thomas Mitchell followed this stream through this area in 1846, prior to european settlement.

The land is mostly 350-400m above sea level and used for grazing and cropping. Some of the slopes of the higher peaks (to 470m) in the south-west of the locality remain densely forested.

== History ==
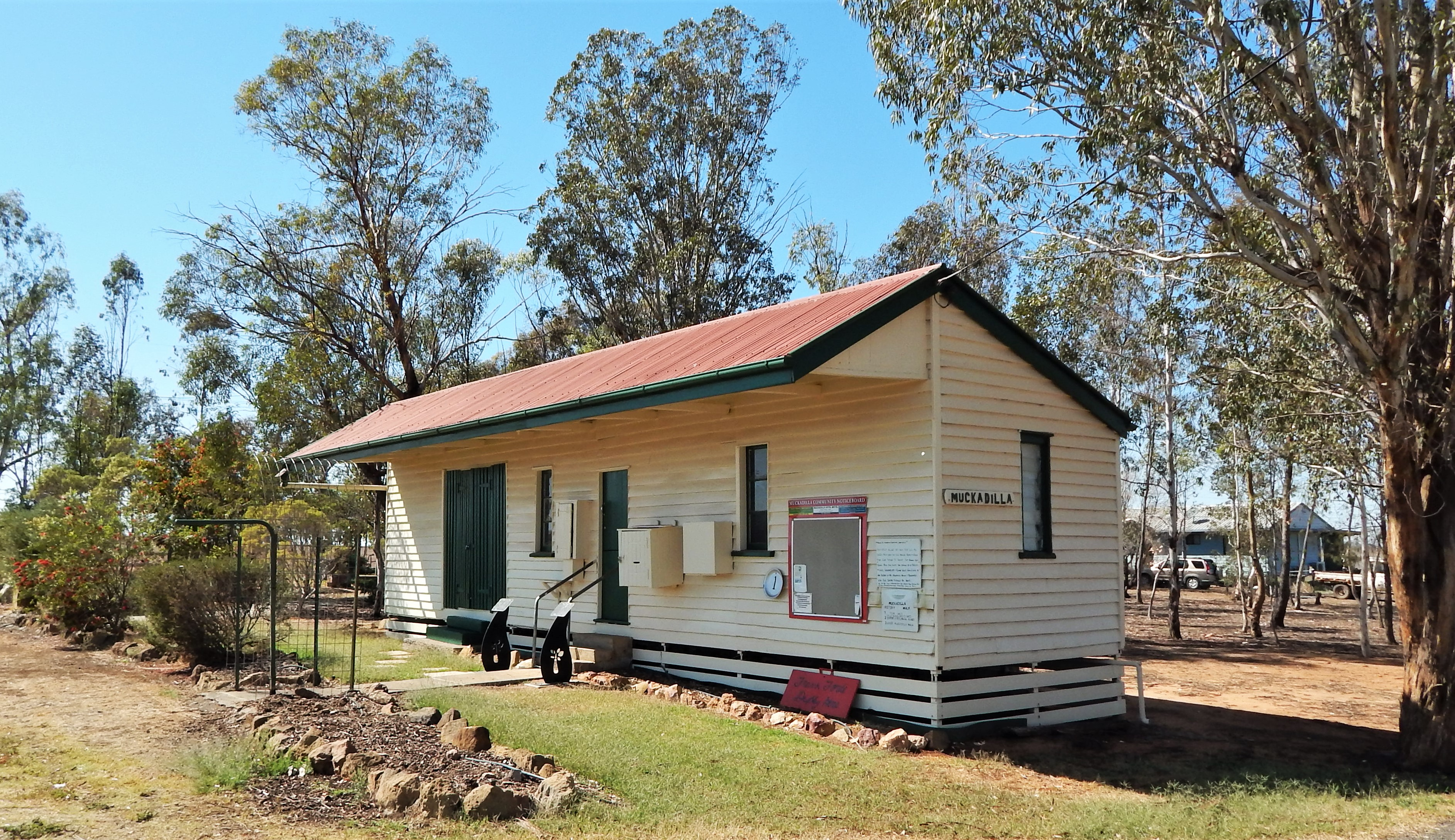
The former Muckadilla Railway Station, now a tourist centre

The name Muckadilla was first used as the creek name, which in turn is believed to be an Aboriginal word (language and dialect unknown) to mean plenty of water.

Muckadilla Provisional School opened on 25 January 1886. It was proclaimed Muckadilla State School on 1 January 1909. The school was mothballed on 31 December 2008, then closed on 31 December 2009. The school was on a 5-acre (2.0 ha) site at the southern end of Centenary Drive (26.5908°S 148.3855°E). The school's website was archived.

In 1889, the Queensland Government drilled a bore at Muckadilla. Although the water supply found was quite small, it was believed that it had healing properties and people flocked to Muckadilla in search of a cure. Dr E.W. Kerr of Brisbane endorsed the water, claiming it had cured "obstinate rheumatism" in some of his patients. The baths were popular and, in 1939, John McEwan Hunter proposed that a sanitorium should be built there to better allow people to improve their "rheumatism, arthritis, uritus, digestion, nerves and general health".

== Demographics ==
In the 2016 census, the locality of Muckadilla had a population of 58 people.

In the 2021 census, the locality of Muckadilla had a population of 38 people.

== Education ==
There are no schools in Muckadilla following Muckadilla State School being mothballed on 31 December 2008 and closed in 2009. The nearest government primary schools are Roma State College in Roma to the east, Mitchell State School in Mitchell to the west, and Dunkeld State School in Dunkeld to the south-west. The nearest government secondary schools are Mitchell State School (to Year 10) and Roma State College (to Year 12).

== Amenities ==
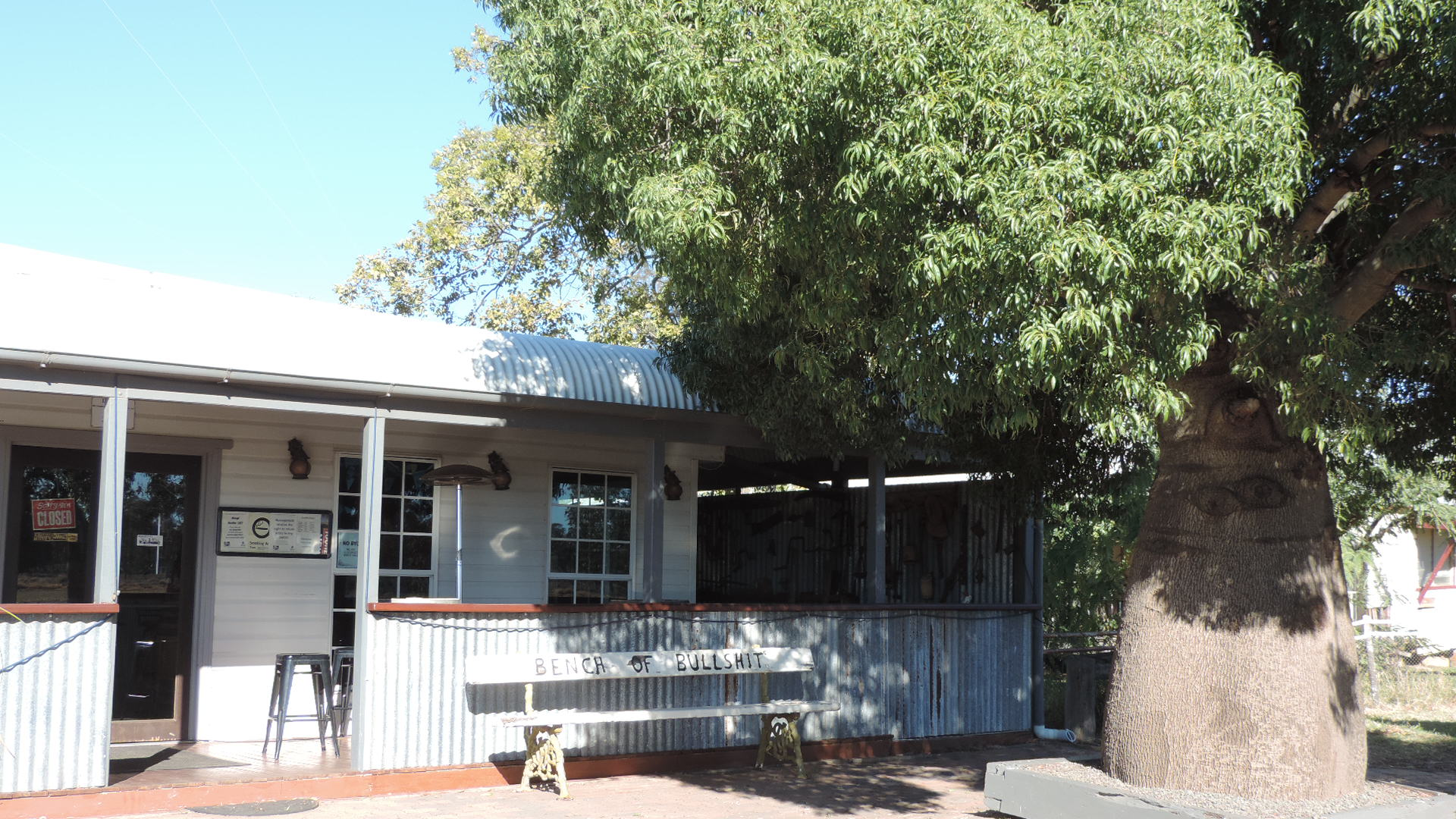
Muckadilla Hotel Motel and the Bench of Bullshit, 2019

The town has a hotel motel and a community hall.

== Popular culture ==
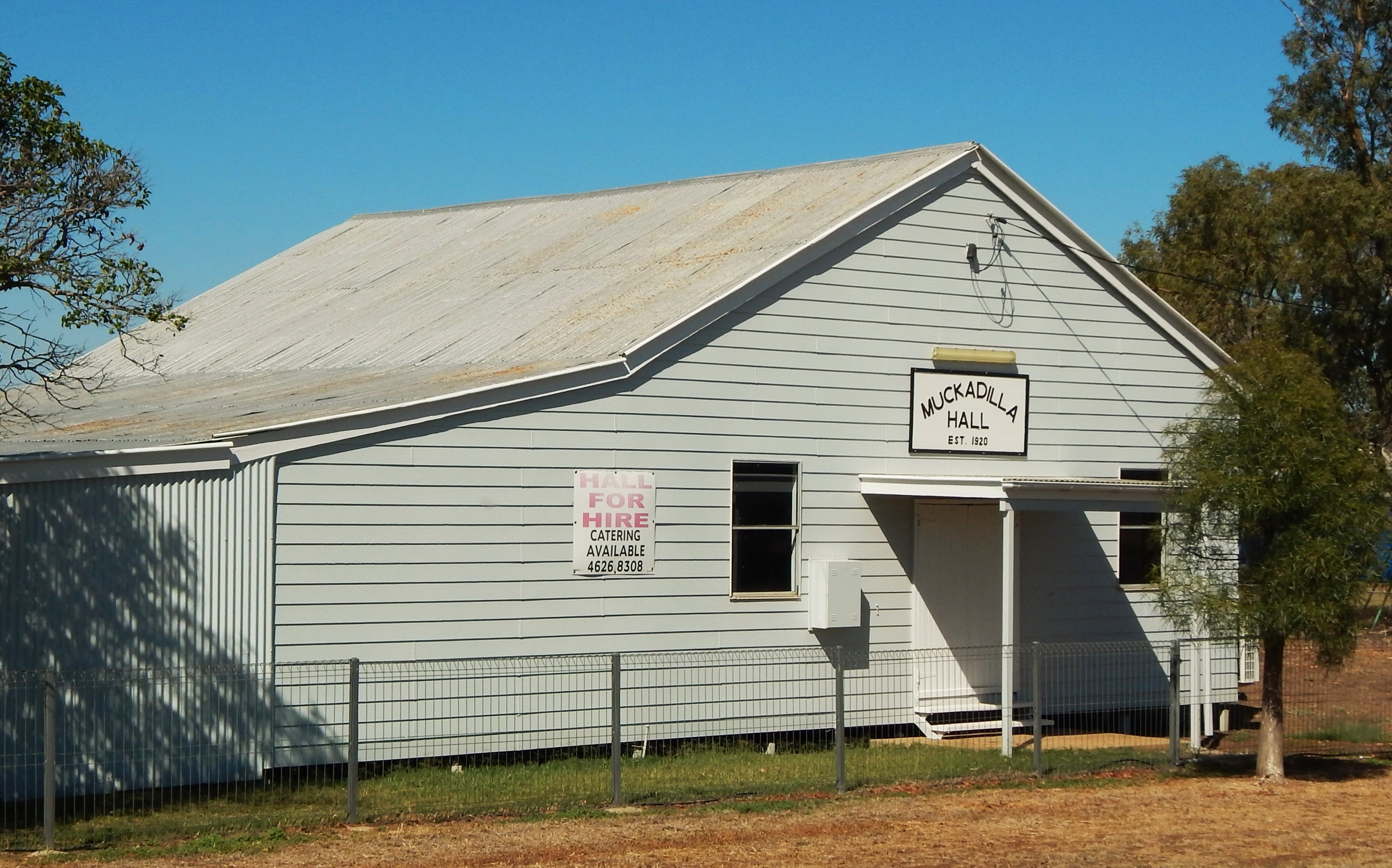
Community hall at Muckadilla

Muckadilla is one of the towns listed in the first verse of I've Been Everywhere.
