= Cornwall, Queensland =

Cornwall
- Suburb
- Interactive map of Cornwall
- Coordinates: 26.0833°S 148.45°E
- Country: Australia
- State: Queensland
- LGA: Maranoa Region
- Location: 44.2 km (27.5 mi) SW of Injune; 82.0 km (51.0 mi) NNW of Roma; 433 km (269 mi) NW of Toowoomba; 561 km (349 mi) WNW of Brisbane

Government
  - State electorate: Warrego
  - Federal division: Maranoa

Area
  - Total: 278.7 km^{2} (107.6 sq mi)

Population
  - Total: 13 (2021 census)
  - Density: 0.0466/km^{2} (0.121/sq mi)
- Time zone: UTC+10:00 (AEST)
- Postcode: 4455
Suburbs around Cornwall
Mount Hutton	Gunnewin	Gunnewin
Kilmorey Falls	Cornwall	Bymount
Kilmorey Falls	Orallo	Orallo

Cornwall is a rural locality in the Maranoa Region, Queensland, Australia. In the 2021 census, Cornwall had a population of 13 people.

== Geography ==
The Great Dividing Range enters the locality from the west (Kilmorey Falls), run across the north of the locality, exiting to the north-east (Gunnewin). This splits the locality across two drainage basins with most of the locality (to the south of the range) being within the Murray Darling basin, specifically within the catchment of the Balonne River, while the northern strip of the locality is within the North East Coast drainage basin, specifically within the catchment of the Fitzroy River.

The land use is predominantly grazing on native vegetation with some small areas of crop growing.

== Demographics ==
In the 2016 census, Cornwall had a population of 16 people.

In the 2021 census, Cornwall had a population of 13 people.

== Education ==
There are no schools in Cornwall. The nearest government primary schools are Bymount East State School in neighbouring Bymount to the east and Injune State School in Injune to the north-east. The nearest government secondary school is Injune State School (to Year 10). There are no nearby schools providing education to Year 12; the alternatives are distance education and boarding school.
