= Injune railway line =

Former railway line in Queensland

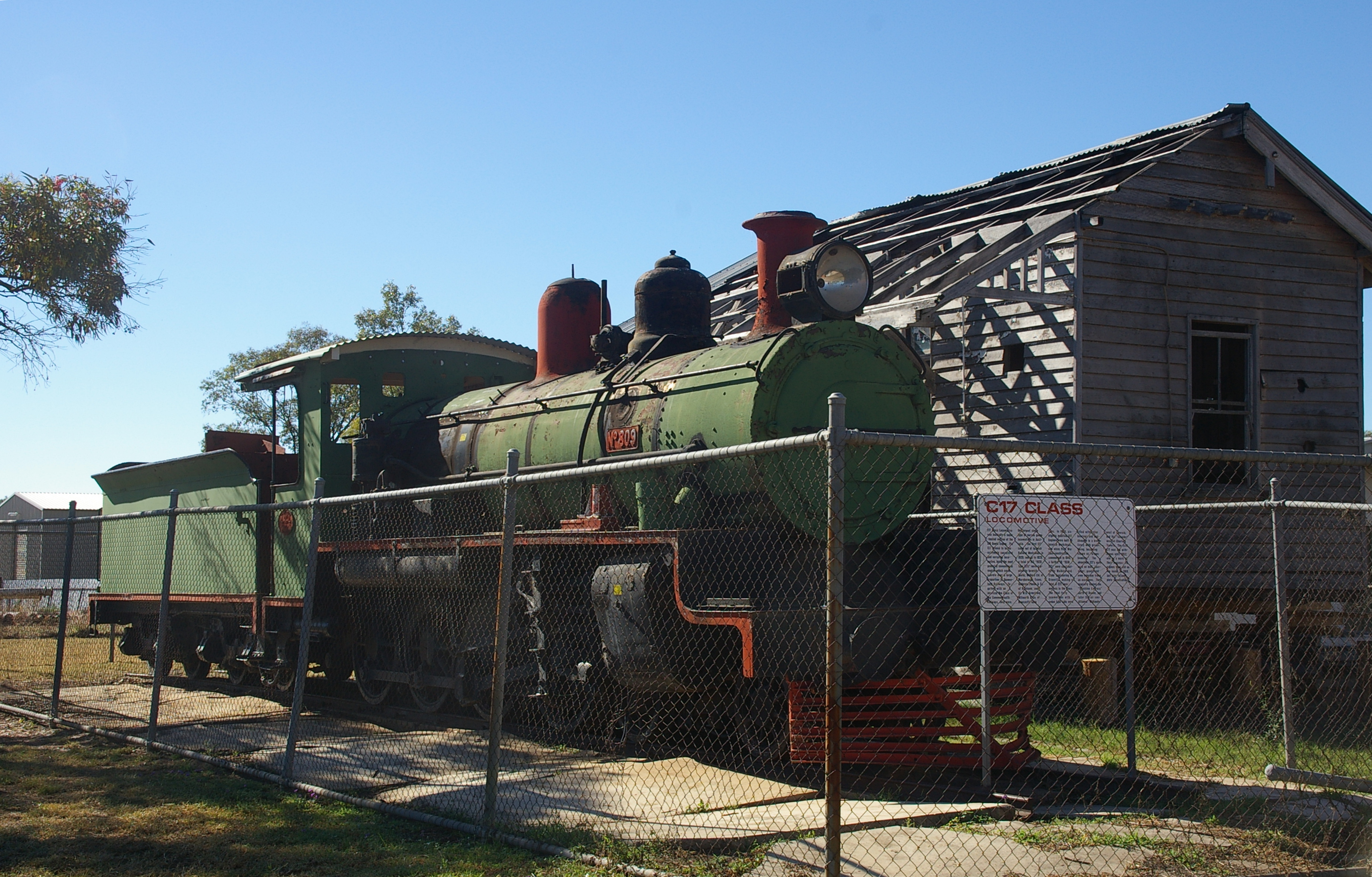
C17 locomotive from the Camp Mountain railway accident is now on display at the former Injune railway station

The Injune Branch Railway was a railway in Queensland, Australia. After the Western Line reached Roma in south-western Queensland in September 1880, there was a plan to foster land settlement as far as Mount Hutton about 90 kilometres (56 mi) to the north. A branch line from Roma about 40 kilometres (25 mi) to Orallo was approved in 1911 and construction began in 1914. Roma Town Council met one third of the construction cost and it opened on 19 September 1916. Sidings were established en route at Ona Ona, Tineen, Minka, Euthulla, Nullawurt, Yingerbay, Kingull, Nareeten, Oogara, Eumina and Moorta. Three trains a week serviced the line, which followed a path to the west of the present day Carnarvon Highway.

Approval for a 53-kilometre (33 mi) extension to Injune Creek was granted in November 1916. There are various theories on the origin of the name Injune, but perhaps the most plausible is that it derives from Ingon a possible aboriginal name for the flying squirrel or sugar glider common to the area. In any event, when the railway reached the region the railhead was called Injune. Intervening sidings beyond Orallo were named Hunteton, Alicker, Bymount, Gunnewin, Okoro, Komine, Bongwara, Kooragan and Blue Lagoon. There were then 53 bridges along its entire path.

Services opened on 30 June 1920 and a thrice-weekly mixed train took over 5 hours to cover the journey. The slow trip is not surprising, as there were six road crossings to negotiate that a fireman was required to open and a guard to close. Livestock, timber and cream provided much of the business until replaced by road transport. Coal and grain were also ferried. The last train left Injune on 31 December 1966 and the line closed from 1 January 1967. Although there was still considerable grain traffic, maintenance costs for its many bridges made the line unviable. The line and facilities were completely dismantled by mid 1968.

A reminder of Queensland's worst rail disaster can be seen at Injune near the site of the old railway station. On 5 May 1947, C17 class locomotive 824 left the rails near Camp Mountain on the Dayboro railway line claiming the lives of 16 people with another 38 injured. The Commonwealth Department of Trade & Customs Recreation and Social Club had chartered the train for a picnic at Closeburn. Negotiating a sharp curve at excessive speed caused the tragedy. The locomotive was repaired and continued in service until May 1967 when it was transferred to Injune along the recently closed line.

== See also ==
- Rail transport in Queensland
