= Eurella, Queensland =

Eurella
- Suburb
- Interactive map of Eurella
- Coordinates: 26.6594°S 148.1688°E
- Country: Australia
- State: Queensland
- LGA: Maranoa Region
- Location: 44.4 km (27.6 mi) SE of Mitchell; 66.6 km (41.4 mi) N of Dunkeld; 83.5 km (51.9 mi) WSW of Roma; 560 km (350 mi) WNW of Brisbane

Government
  - State electorate: Warrego
  - Federal division: Maranoa

Area
  - Total: 813.2 km^{2} (314.0 sq mi)

Population
  - Total: 45 (2021 census)
  - Density: 0.0553/km^{2} (0.1433/sq mi)
- Time zone: UTC+10:00 (AEST)
- Postcode: 4462
Suburbs around Eurella
Mitchell	Amby; Walhallow	Mount Bindango
Womalilla	Eurella	Muckadilla
V Gate	Dunkeld	Mount Abundance

Eurella is a rural locality in the Maranoa Region, Queensland, Australia. In the 2021 census, Eurella had a population of 45 people.

== Geography ==
Eurella is bounded by the Maranoa River to the west.

The Warrego Highway and the Western railway line pass through the northern part of the locality from east (Muckadilla) to west (Amby) with the locality being served by Eurella railway station (26.5689°S 148.2561°E).

The predominant land use is grazing on native vegetation with some crop growing.

== History ==
The locality takes its name from the creek name, which in turn takes its name from the pastoral operated in 1861 by T.J. Saddler and Edward Eagle Moore in 1861. It is believed to be an Aboriginal word meaning eagle hawk.

== Demographics ==
In the 2016 census, Eurella had a population of 11 people.

In the 2021 census, Eurella had a population of 45 people.

== Education ==
There are no schools in Eurella. The nearest government primary schools are Mitchell State School in neighbouring Mitchell to the north-west, Dunkeld State School in neighbouring Dunkeld to the south, and Roma State College in Roma to the east. The nearest government secondary schools are Charleville State High School (to Year 12), Mitchell State School (to Year 10) and Roma State College (to Year 12).
