= Gunnewin, Queensland =

Gunnewin
- Suburb
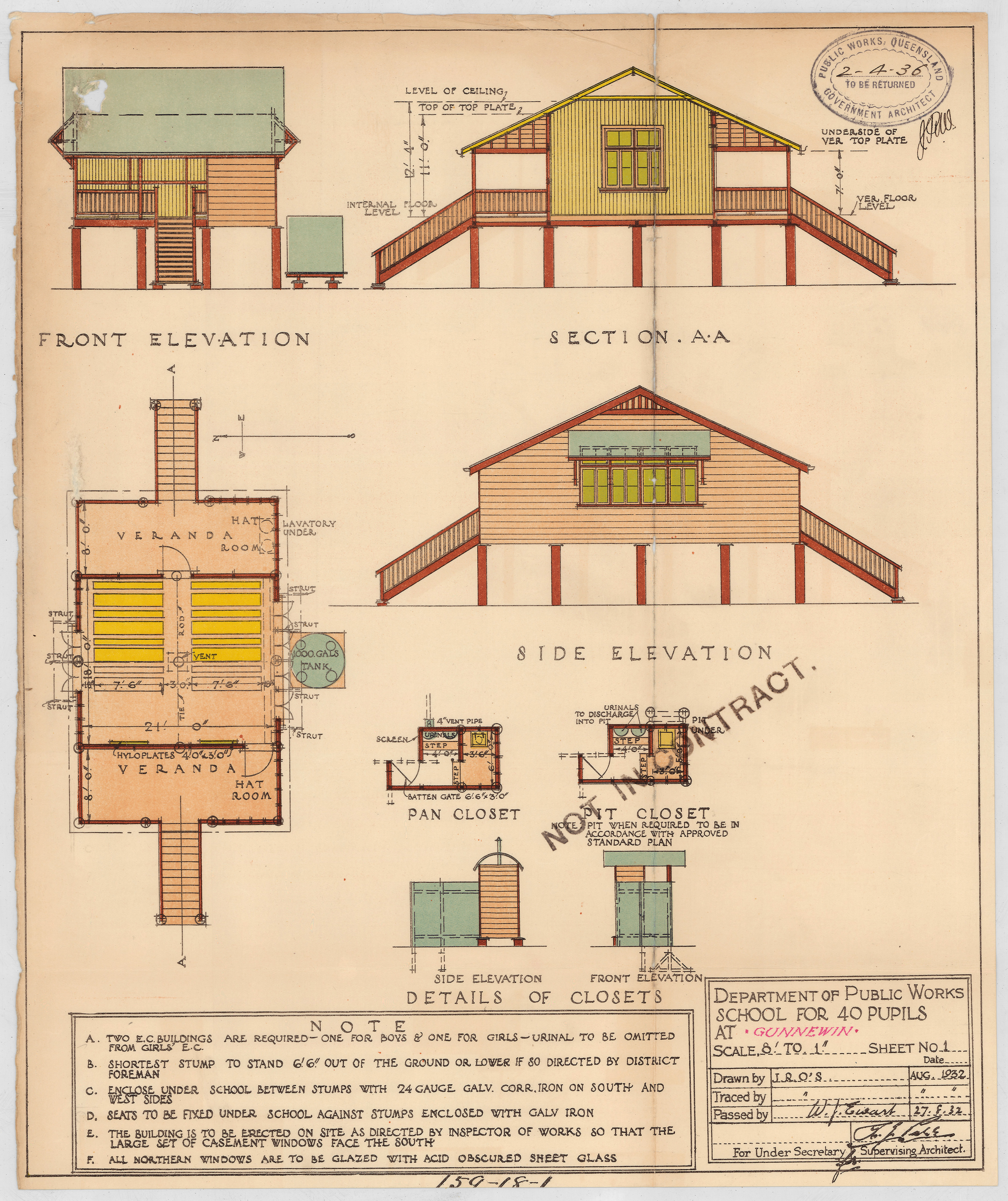
- Plan for Gunnewin State School, 1932

- Interactive map of Gunnewin
- Coordinates: 25.9716°S 148.6038°E
- Country: Australia
- State: Queensland
- LGA: Maranoa Region
- Location: 16.8 km (10.4 mi) S of Injune; 73.9 km (45.9 mi) NNW of Roma; 425 km (264 mi) NW of Toowoomba; 551 km (342 mi) NW of Brisbane

Government
  - State electorate: Warrego
  - Federal division: Maranoa

Area
  - Total: 422.7 km^{2} (163.2 sq mi)

Population
  - Total: 55 (2021 census)
  - Density: 0.1301/km^{2} (0.3370/sq mi)
- Time zone: UTC+10:00 (AEST)
- Postcode: 4455
Suburbs around Gunnewin
Mount Hutton	Injune	Highland Plains
Cornwall	Gunnewin	Eumamurrin
Cornwall	Bymount	Eumamurrin

Gunnewin is a rural locality in the Maranoa Region, Queensland, Australia. In the 2021 census, Gunnewin had a population of 55 people.

== Geography ==
The former Injune railway line traversed the locality. Komine is a neighbourhood near the former Komine railway station in the far north of the locality (25.9166°S 148.55°E). Okoro is a neighbourhood near the former Okora railway station in the north of the locality (25.95°S 148.55°E).

== History ==
Komine railway station was named by the Queensland Railways Department on 17 August 1920. The name is an Aboriginal name for a local large creek.

Barramundi State School opened circa 1921. Circa 1925 it was renamed Komine State School. It closed in 1936.

Okoro railway station was named on 22 June 1922. It is an Aboriginal word meaning Brigalow (a type of tree).

The name Gunnewin was first used in 1926 and is an Aboriginal word meaning ringtailed possum or possum trap. It was used for the railway station name from 17 August 1940.

Gunnewin Provisional School and Gunnewin West Provisional School both opened on 27 February 1922 as half-time schools (meaning they shared a single teacher between them). Both schools closed later in 1922.

Upper Injune Provisional School opened on 11 October 1926. In 1928 it was renamed Gunnewin West State School. It closed in 1945.

Gunnewin State School opened circa 1934 and closed circa 1944.

== Demographics ==
In the 2016 census, Gunnewin had a population of 59 people.

In the 2021 census, Gunnewin had a population of 55 people.

== Education ==
There are no schools in Gunnewin. The nearest government primary schools are Bymount East State School in neighbouring Bymount to the south and Injune State School in Injune to the north. The nearest government secondary schools is Injune State School (to Year 10). There are no secondary schools offering education to Year 12 nearby. The alternatives are distance education and boarding school.
