= Mount Bindango, Queensland =

Mount Bindango
- Suburb
- Interactive map of Mount Bindango
- Coordinates: 26.505°S 148.4802°E
- Country: Australia
- State: Queensland
- LGA: Maranoa Region
- Location: 23.1 km (14.4 mi) W of Roma; 374 km (232 mi) WNW of Toowoomba; 500 km (310 mi) WNW of Brisbane

Government
  - State electorate: Warrego
  - Federal division: Maranoa

Area
  - Total: 321.2 km^{2} (124.0 sq mi)
- Elevation: 340–570 m (1,120–1,870 ft)

Population
  - Total: 26 (2021 census)
  - Density: 0.0809/km^{2} (0.210/sq mi)
- Time zone: UTC+10:00 (AEST)
- Postcode: 4455
Suburbs around Mount Bindango
Walhallow	Orallo	Bungeworgorai
Eurella	Mount Bindango	Bungeworgorai
Muckadilla	Mount Abundance	Hodgson

Mount Bindango is a rural locality in the Maranoa Region, Queensland, Australia. In the 2021 census, Mount Bindango had a population of 26 people.

== Geography ==
The Warrego Highway forms the southern boundary of the locality, entering the locality from Hodgson/Mount Abundance to the east and exiting to Muckadilla in the south-west. The Western railway line runs parallel and immediately north of the highway.

Brinsop was a neighbourhood (26.5833°S 148.4666°E) that developed around the now-abandoned Brinsop railway station (26.5889°S 148.4724°E) on the Western railway line in the south-west of the locality. The abandoned Bindango railway station was also on the Western railway line (26.5825°S 148.5447°E) on the southern boundary of the locality.

Ona Ona was a neighbourhood (26.5333°S 148.5833°E). that developed around the Ona Ona railway station on the now-closed Injune railway line.

There are two named peaks, close together in the north-west of the locality:

- Mount Bindango (26.44°S 148.3963°E ) 570 metres (1,870 ft) above sea level
- Mount Bindyego (26.4455°S 148.3625°E ) 540 metres (1,770 ft) above sea level

The land use is agricultural, mostly grazing on native vegetation, and there are a number of homesteads in the locality:

- Bindango (26.5443°S 148.5487°E)
- Coonong (26.5481°S 148.3879°E)
- Glen Alva (26.5048°S 148.4530°E)
- Goldsborough (26.5303°S 148.5835°E)
- Keele Downs (26.5031°S 148.3907°E )
- Myrong (26.4562°S 148.4852°E )
- Norolle (26.5373°S 148.4827°E )
- North Bindango (26.4561°S 148.4299°E )

== History ==
The locality takes its name from the mountain, which was named on 11 May 1846 by the Surveyor-General of New South Wales, Thomas Mitchell, based on the name given to him by Aboriginal informants. Mount Bindyego was also named by Mitchell on the same day based on the name provided by Aboriginal informants.

The name Brinsop comes from the village of Brinsop in Herefordshire, England, which possibly means brown valley (brun/hop).

The name Ona Ona was assigned on 29 April 1915 by the Queensland Railways Department, an Aboriginal phrase, meaning boxtree flat.

At about 5.30 a.m. on Friday 6 November 1987, Cunnamulla-bound Westlander train 3V02, hauled by 1700 Class Locomotive 1706 was derailed at the nearby Bindango railway siding between Hodgson and Muckadilla, approximately 25 kilometres (16 mi) west of Roma. An infant was burnt to death in the resulting fire. Investigations revealed that the points had been deliberately changed from the main railway line to divert the train into the siding. 1706 was written off as a result of the accident. The police offered a reward of $50,000 for information leading to the person responsible.

== Demographics ==
In the 2016 census, Mount Bindango had a population of 33 people.

In the 2021 census, Mount Bindango had a population of 26 people.

== Education ==
There are no schools in Mount Bindango. Roma State College in Roma to the east is the nearest primary and secondary school.
