= Bymount, Queensland =

Bymount
- Suburb
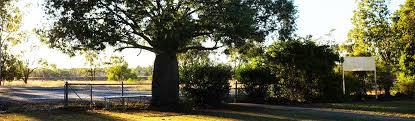
- Bymount East State School grounds

- Interactive map of Bymount
- Coordinates: 26.0919°S 148.6252°E
- Country: Australia
- State: Queensland
- LGA: Maranoa Region
- Location: 26.4 km (16.4 mi) S of Injune; 64.2 km (39.9 mi) N of Roma; 415 km (258 mi) NW of Toowoomba; 599 km (372 mi) WNW of Brisbane

Government
  - State electorate: Warrego
  - Federal division: Maranoa

Area
  - Total: 261.0 km^{2} (100.8 sq mi)

Population
  - Total: 47 (2021 census)
  - Density: 0.1801/km^{2} (0.466/sq mi)
- Time zone: UTC+10:00 (AEST)
- Postcode: 4455
Suburbs around Bymount
Gunnewin	Gunnewin	Gunnewin
Cornwall	Bymount	Eumamurrin
Orallo	Orallo	Eumamurrin

Bymount is a rural locality in the Maranoa Region, Queensland, Australia. In the 2021 census, Bymount had a population of 47 people.

== Geography ==
The Carnarvon Highway passes north to south through the locality.

== History ==
Bymount State School opened in September 1927 but closed in December 1932. It reopened on 2 November 1938. On 1 March 1945, another school, Bymount East State School, opened. On 11 May 1947, Bymount State School closed leaving only Bymount East State School.

== Demographics ==
In the 2016 census Bymount had a population of 32 people.

In the 2021 census, Bymount had a population of 47 people.

== Education ==
Bymount East State School is a government primary (Prep-6) school for boys and girls at 6441 Carnarvon Highway (26.0638°S 148.6026°E). In 2016, the school had an enrolment of 7 students with 1 teacher and 3 non-teaching staff (1 full-time equivalent). In 2018, the school had an enrolment of 6 students with 1 teacher and 3 non-teaching staff (1 full-time equivalent).

There are no secondary schools in Bymount. The nearest government secondary schools are Injune State School (to Year 10) in Injune to the north and Roma State College (to Year 12) in Roma to the south. However, due to the distance, most students in Bymount would not be able to attend Roma State College; the alternatives are distance education and boarding school.
