= Mount Hutton, Queensland =

Mount Hutton
- Suburb
- Interactive map of Mount Hutton
- Coordinates: 25.9088°S 148.3466°E
- Country: Australia
- State: Queensland
- LGA: Maranoa Region
- Location: 28.1 km (17.5 mi) SW of Injune; 109 km (68 mi) NNW of Roma; 459 km (285 mi) NW of Toowoomba; 587 km (365 mi) NW of Brisbane

Government
  - State electorate: Warrego
  - Federal division: Maranoa

Area
  - Total: 390.9 km^{2} (150.9 sq mi)

Population
  - Total: 32 (2021 census)
  - Density: 0.0819/km^{2} (0.212/sq mi)
- Time zone: UTC+10:00 (AEST)
- Postcode: 4454
Suburbs around Mount Hutton
Womblebank	Hutton Creek	Hutton Creek
Kilmorey Falls	Mount Hutton	Injune
Kilmorey Falls	Cornwall	Gunnewin

Mount Hutton is a rural locality in the Maranoa Region, Queensland, Australia. In the 2021 census, Mount Hutton had a population of 32 people.

== Geography ==
The locality lies east of the Great Dividing Range with the eponymous mountain, Mount Hutton, in the north-east of the locality (25.8517°S 148.3398°E) rising to 940 metres (3,080 ft) above sea level.

The land use is grazing on native vegetation.

== History ==
In May 1916, the Queensland Government purchased the leasehold of the Mount Hutton pastoral property for £73,500, which included 10,243 cattle and 260 horses. The government's intention was to subdivide the property for closer settlement.

Following World War I in 1919, the subdivision of blocks occurred with about half being available to soldier settlers and others being open to any purchasers. The open blocks attracted little interest but returned soldiers took up the soldier settlement blocks. Like many other soldier settlements in Queensland, the scheme was mostly a failure. The land was not suitable for the government's proposed use for dairying and crop growing due to receiving lower levels of rainfall than claimed, the soldiers had insufficient capital to develop their land, the blocks of land were too small to provide the income needed by a family, there was insufficient timber available for building houses, and so on.

Mount Hutton East Provisional School opened on 13 February 1922 and closed circa 1924.

== Demographics ==
In the 2016 census, Mount Hutton had a population of 34 people.

In the 2021 census, Mount Hutton had a population of 32 people.

== Education ==
There are no schools in Mount Hutton. The nearest government school is Injune State School in neighbouring Injune to the east which provides primary and secondary schooling to Year 10. There are no schools providing schooling to Year 12 nearby; the alternatives are distance education and boarding school.
