= Mitchell, Queensland =

Mitchell
- Town
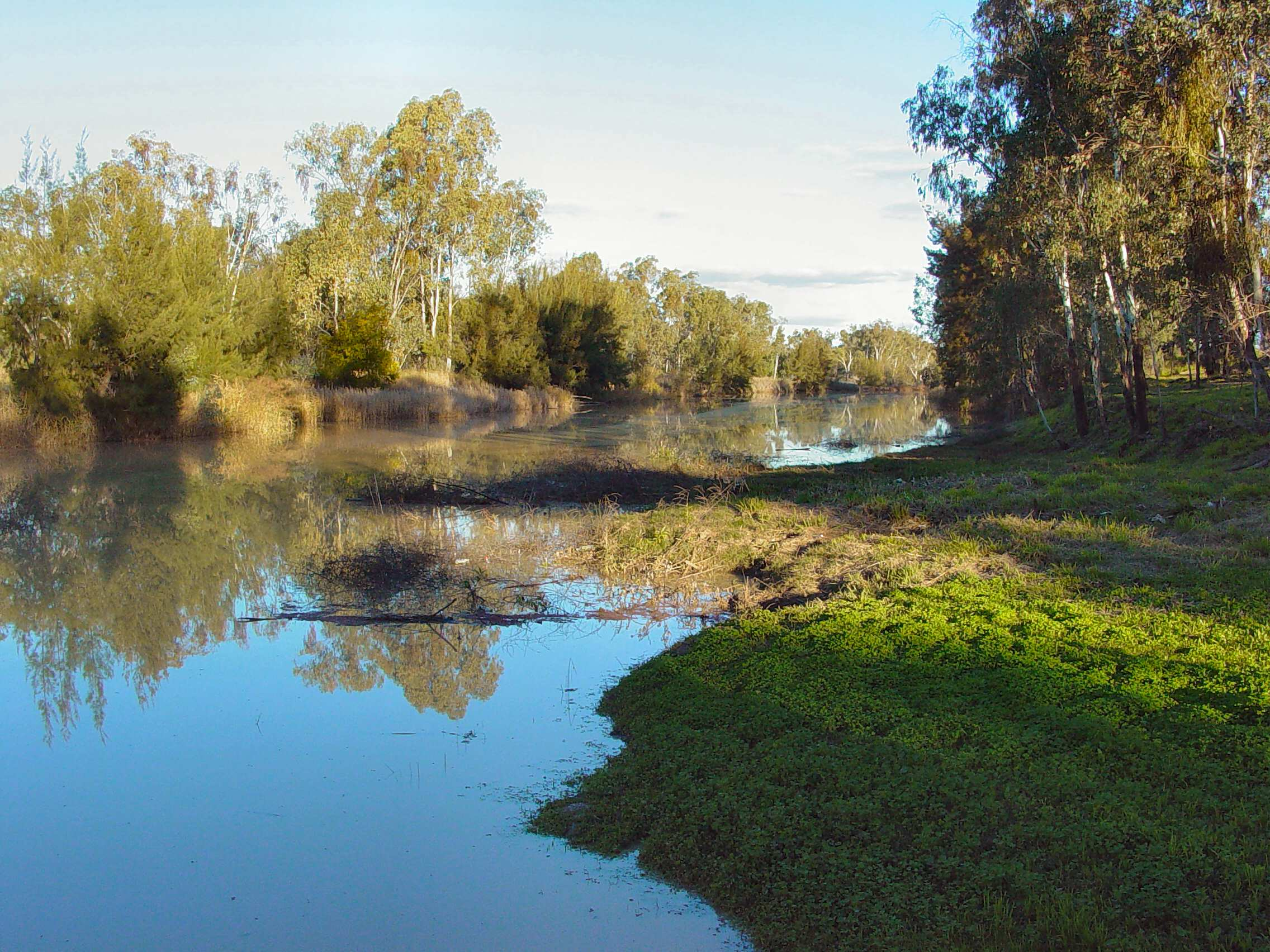
- Looking downstream on the Maranoa River on the eastern side of Mitchell

- Interactive map of Mitchell
- Coordinates: 26.4861°S 147.9752°E
- Country: Australia
- State: Queensland
- LGA: Maranoa Region
- Location: 87.4 km (54.3 mi) W of Roma; 441 km (274 mi) W of Toowoomba; 587 km (365 mi) W of Brisbane
- Established: 1864

Government
  - State electorate: Warrego
  - Federal division: Maranoa

Area
  - Total: 602.9 km^{2} (232.8 sq mi)
- Elevation: 336.3 m (1,103 ft)

Population
  - Total: 995 (2021 census)
  - Density: 1.6504/km^{2} (4.2744/sq mi)
- Time zone: UTC+10:00 (AEST)
- Postcode: 4465
- County: Dublin
- Mean max temp: 27.9 °C (82.2 °F)
- Mean min temp: 11.9 °C (53.4 °F)
- Annual rainfall: 562.3 mm (22.14 in)
Localities around Mitchell
Forestvale	Kilmorey Falls	Walhallow
Womalilla	Mitchell	Walhallow
Womalilla	Eurella	Amby

Mitchell is a rural town and locality in the Maranoa Region, Queensland, Australia. The town services the local area, a cattle and sheep farming district. In the 2021 census, the locality of Mitchell had a population of 995 people.

== Geography ==
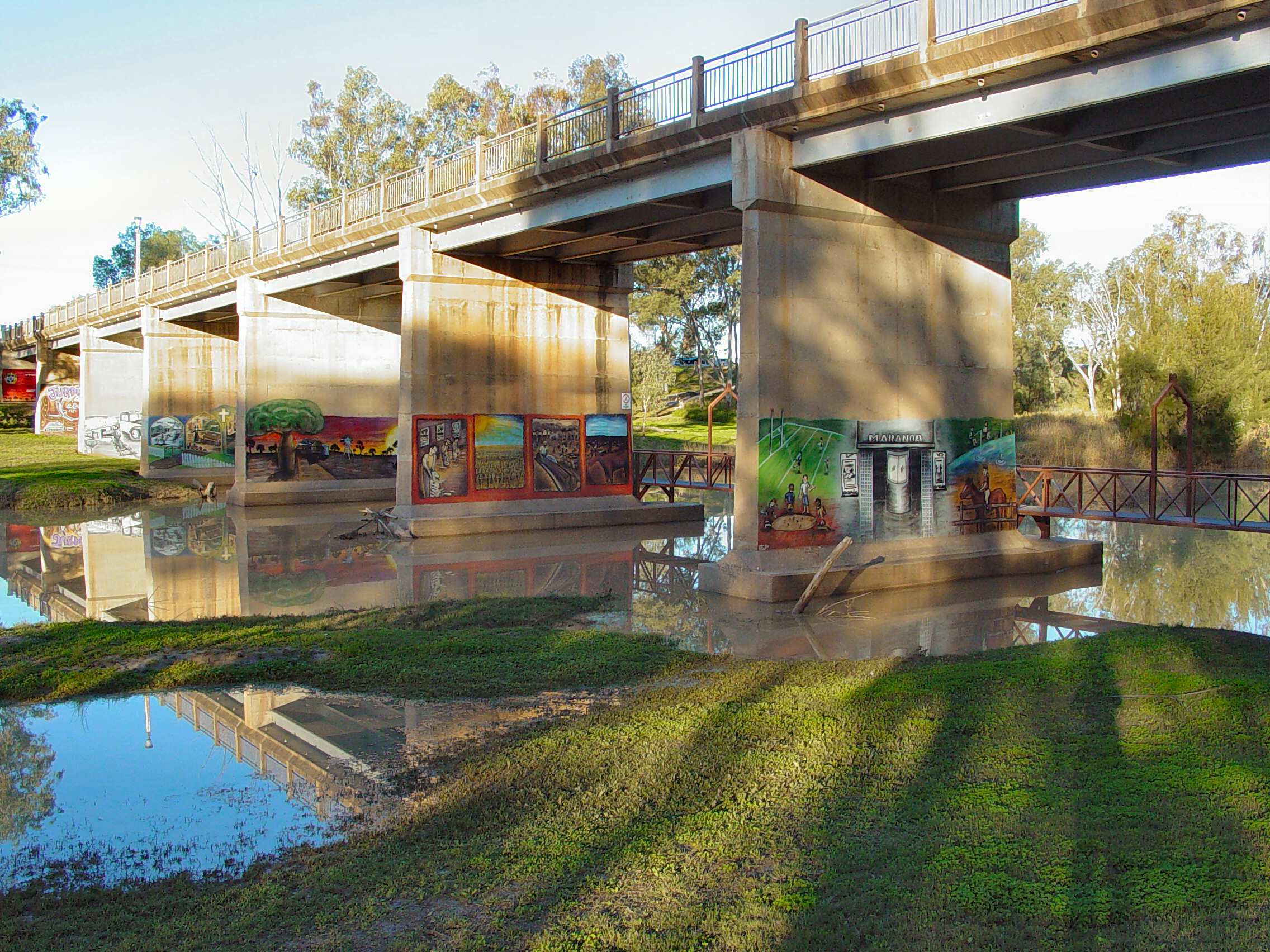
Warrego Highway crossing the Maranoa.

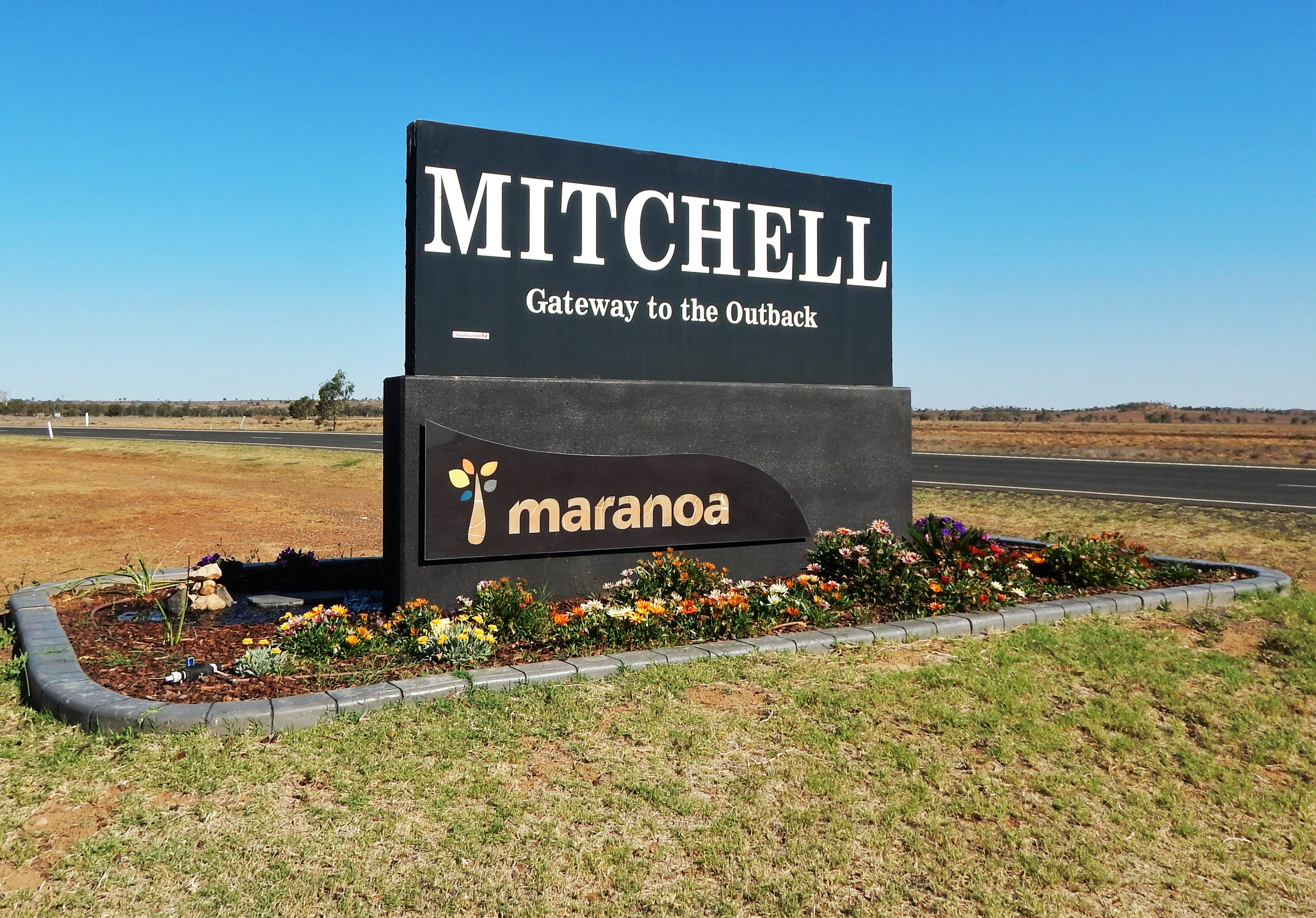
Sign on the Warrego Highway at the western entrance to Mitchell

Mitchell is on the Warrego Highway, 587 kilometres (365 mi) west of Brisbane, 441 kilometres (274 miles) west of Toowoomba, 230 kilometres (140 miles) west of Miles, 89 kilometres (55 miles) west of Roma and 178 kilometres (111 miles) east of Charleville. The Warrego Highway passes through town to form the main street, Cambridge Street. The Maranoa River flows around the northern and eastern sides of the town before eventually flowing into the Balonne River.

The Western railway passes through the locality, entering from the east (Amby / Walhallow) and exiting to the west (Womalilla). The locality is served by a number of railway stations, from west to east:

- Mitchell railway station, a passenger stop in the town (26.4872°S 147.9687°E)
- Booringa railway siding, now dismantled (26.4872°S 148.0002°E)
- Marbango railway station, now abandoned (26.4888°S 148.0618°E)

Mitchell Airstrip is west of the town (26.4878°S 147.9430°E). Its IATA airport code is MTQ and its ICAO airport code is YMIT. It is operated by the Maranoa Regional Council and is suitable for light aircraft.

== History ==
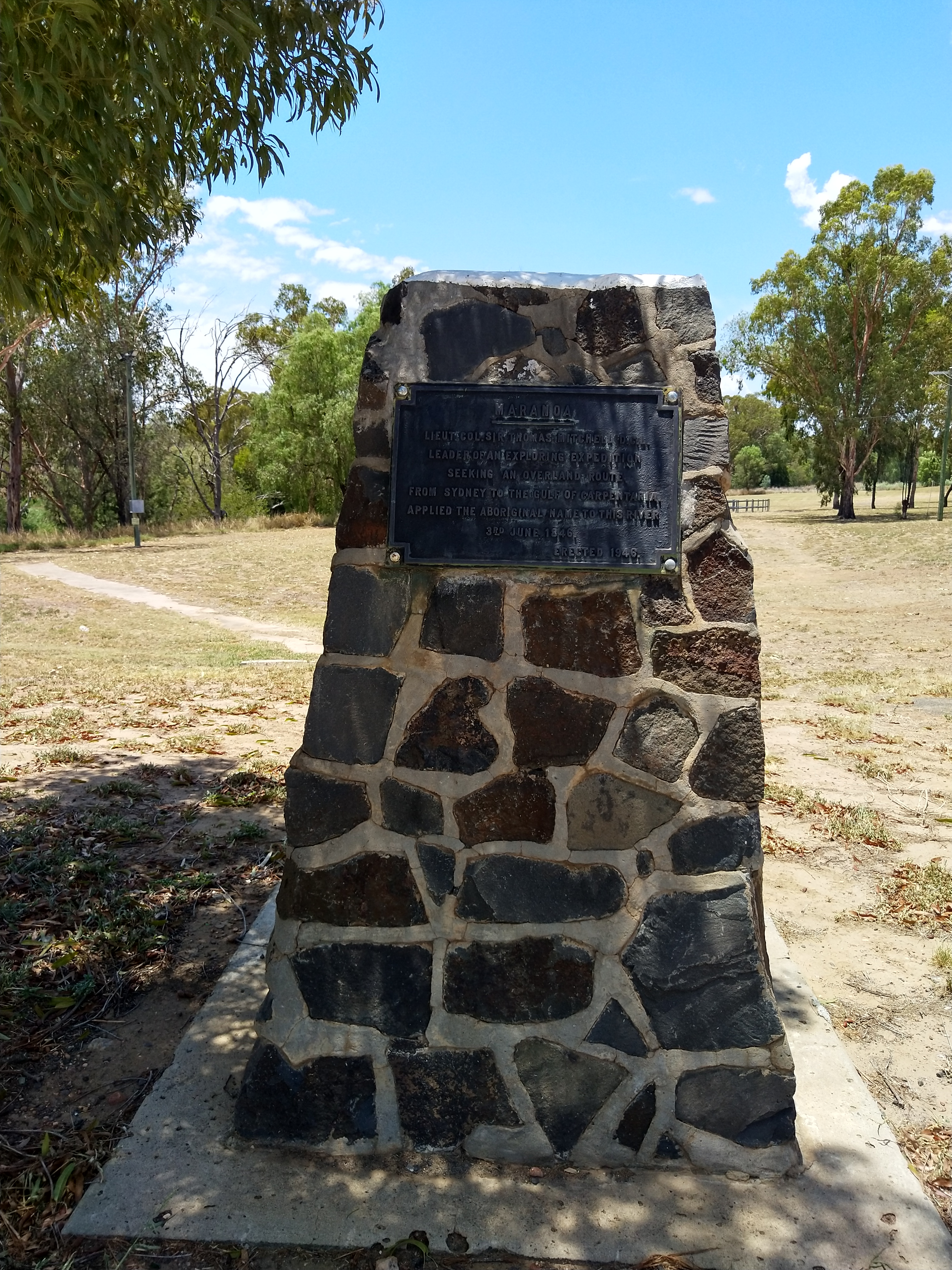
Centenary memorial erected in 1946 at Mitchell, Queensland to commemorate explorer Thomas Mitchell's naming of the nearby Maranoa River.

Before the arrival of Europeans, the Maranoa region was occupied by the Mandandanji and Gunggari Aboriginal peoples. Based on archaeological excavations in the Mount Moffatt area, it has been deduced that the Aboriginals had lived there for around 19,500 years. Descendants of the original peoples still live in and visit the area today.

Mandandanji (also known as Mandandanyi, Mandandanjdji, Kogai) is an Australian Aboriginal language spoken by the Mandandanji people. The Mandandanji language region includes the landscape within the local government boundaries of the Maranoa Regional Council, particularly Roma, Yuleba and Surat, then east towards Chinchilla and south-west towards Mitchell and St George.

The town is named after Sir Thomas Mitchell explorer and Surveyor General of New South Wales, who explored the area in 1846.

In 1862, Edmund Morey established the property of Mitchell Downs. When the original homestead was partially destroyed by a flood in 1864, Thomas Close acquired the building's ruins and established the Mitchell Downs Hotel.

On 1 January 1865, Mitchell Downs Post Office opened and around 1878 was renamed Mitchell Post Office.

Mitchell State School opened on 1 April 1876 as a primary school. In 1961, it was expanded to include a secondary school.

The first St Columba's Catholic Church was officially opened and blessed by Bishop Robert Dunne on Saturday 15 November 1884. On Sunday 24 April 1938, the new St Columba's Catholic Church was officially opened and blessed by Monsignor McKenna of Toowoomba. It was designed by J.P. Donoghue. The timber church was built by contractor F.T. Woollam at a cost of £3000. It can seat 350 people.

The foundation block for the first All Saints' Anglican Church in Mitchell was laid by Coadjutor Bishop Nathaniel Dawes on Wednesday 13 November 1889. The church was officially opened on Tuesday 5 August 1890 by Bishop William Webber. It was designed by architect John H. Buckeridge. It was 45 by 25 feet (13.7 m × 7.6 m) and could seat 150 people. It was built from cypress pine by Roma contractors, Allen Clell & Sons, at a cost of £274. The current All Saints' Anglican Church was built in 1965. It was designed by Ford Hutton, Newell, Black, and Paulson. This brick church can seat 110 people.

A Wesleyan Methodist Church was opened in Mitchell in April 1894. It could seat 80 people. It was built from timber at a cost of £200. Following the amalgamations of various denominations, it later became Mitchell Methodist Church and then Mitchell Uniting Church. It was at 82 Mary Street (26.488078°S 147.9782°E). It has closed and been converted into a house.

In 1902, after a short stand-off, bushrangers Patrick and James Kenniff were captured south of Mitchell at a location previously known as Back Creek but now known as Arrest Creek. Patrick was hanged in 1903 for the murder of Constable George Doyle (who had previously served at Wyandra) and Albert Dahlke, while James was released after 12 years imprisonment and died peacefully in 1940.

Long Gully Provisional School opened in 1915 on the road from Mitchell to St George; it closed in 1918.

St Patrick's Catholic Primary School opened on 4 November 1923.

Mitchell Aboriginal Provisional School opened on 1 May 1935 and was later proclaimed Mitchell Aboriginal State School. It closed on 19 November 1948.

Mitchell was once the administrative centre of the Shire of Booringa local government area. Since 2008, the town is now part of the Maranoa Region.

In the March 2010 floods, the Maranoa River reached a peak of 13.4 m in the town causing an inundation of 25 houses. The town experienced the worst flooding ever in 2012 when a monsoon trough hovered over central and southern Queensland and nearly inundated Charleville, 180 km (110 mi) to the west.

== Demographics ==
In the 2006 census, the town of Mitchell had a population of 944 people.

In the 2011 census, the locality of Mitchell had a population of 1,311 people.

In the 2016 census, the locality of Mitchell had a population of 1,031 people.

In the 2021 census, the locality of Mitchell had a population of 995 people.

== Heritage listings ==
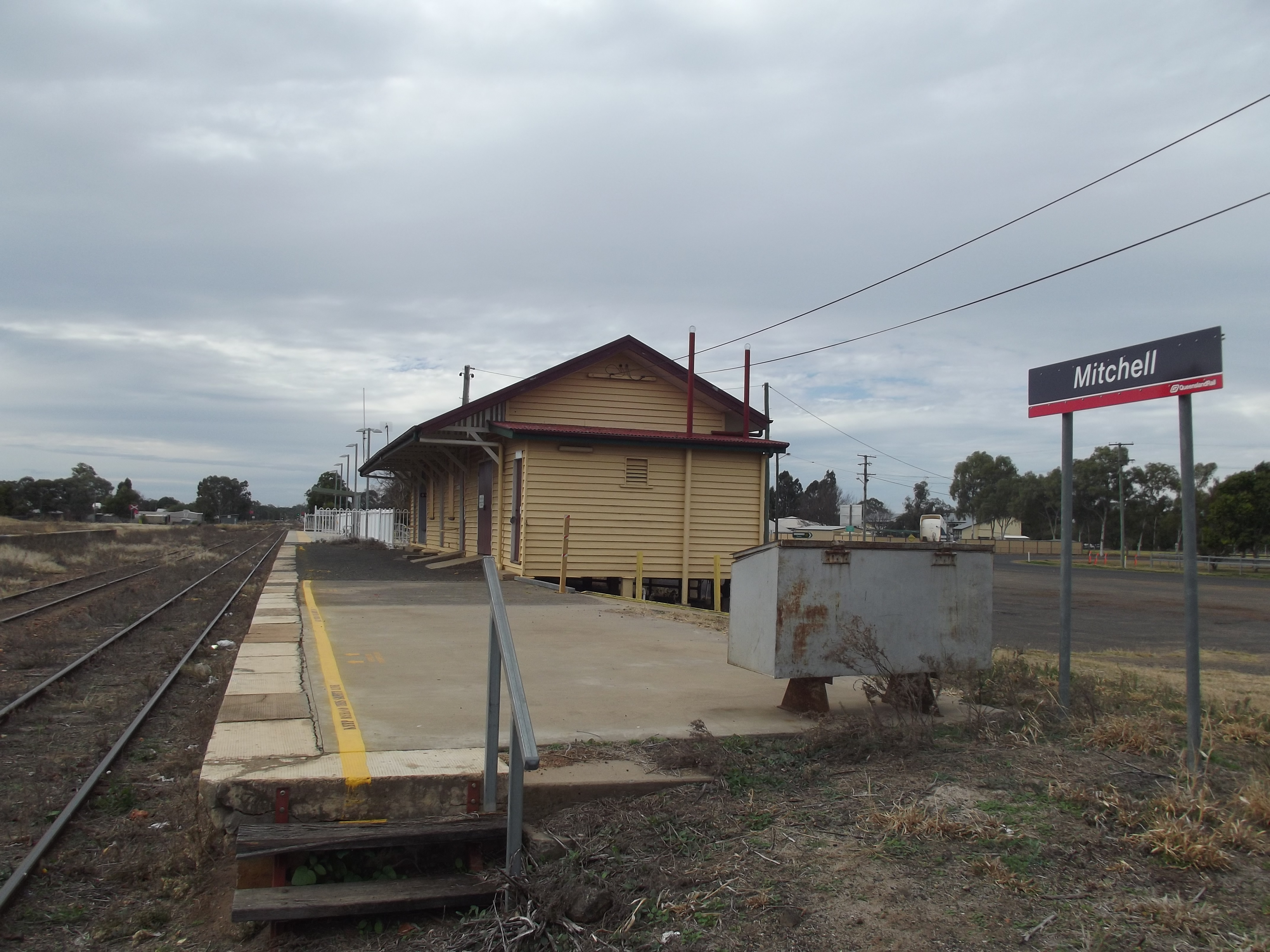
Mitchell railway station (looking towards Roma and Toowoomba)

Mitchell has a number of heritage-listed sites, including:

- Mitchell War Memorial, Cambridge Street (26.4892°S 147.9718°E)
- Mitchell railway station: Oxford Street (26.4872°S 147.9687°E) including:
  - Goods Shed in Alice Street used by Watco Australia and Aurizon
  - Station master's house in Sheffield Street

Mitchell State School (1914 Building) at 105 Cambridge Street (26.488°S 147.9713°E) was listed on the Queensland Heritage Register in 1994, but the building was removed as part of approved development and its heritage listing cancelled in 2015.

== Education ==
Mitchell State School is a government primary and secondary (Prep–10) school for boys and girls at 105 Cambridge Street (26.4885°S 147.9715°E). In 2017, the school had an enrolment of 132 students with 16 teachers (13 full-time equivalent) and 15 non-teaching staff (10 full-time equivalent). In 2018, the school had an enrolment of 137 students with 15 teachers (13 full-time equivalent) and 14 non-teaching staff (10 full-time equivalent). Students come from Mitchell, Mungallala, Amby and surrounding properties. Students in Years 11 and 12 are taken by bus to Roma State College in Roma.

St Patrick's Primary School is a Catholic primary (Prep–6) school for boys and girls at 100 Alice Street (26.4841°S 147.9737°E). In 2017, the school had an enrolment of 37 students with 2 teachers and 6 non-teaching staff. In 2018, the school had an enrolment of 32 students with 4 teachers (3 full-time equivalent) and 5 non-teaching staff (3 full-time equivalent).

A major language revival effort has been under way in Queensland schools since St Patrick's School started teaching the Gunggari language around 2013. Since then, Mitchell State School has also started teaching Gunggari.

== Amenities ==
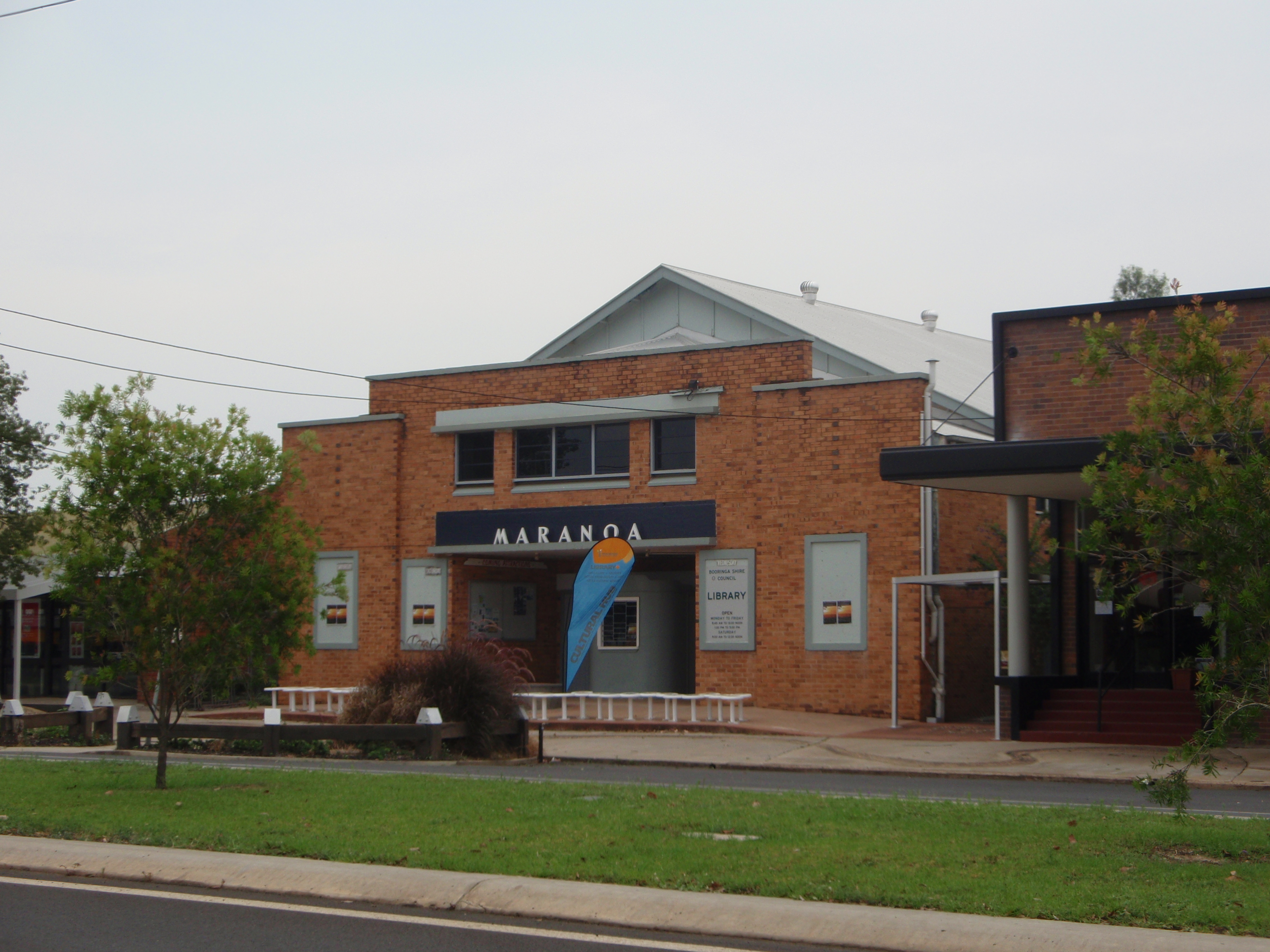
Mitchell Library, 2011

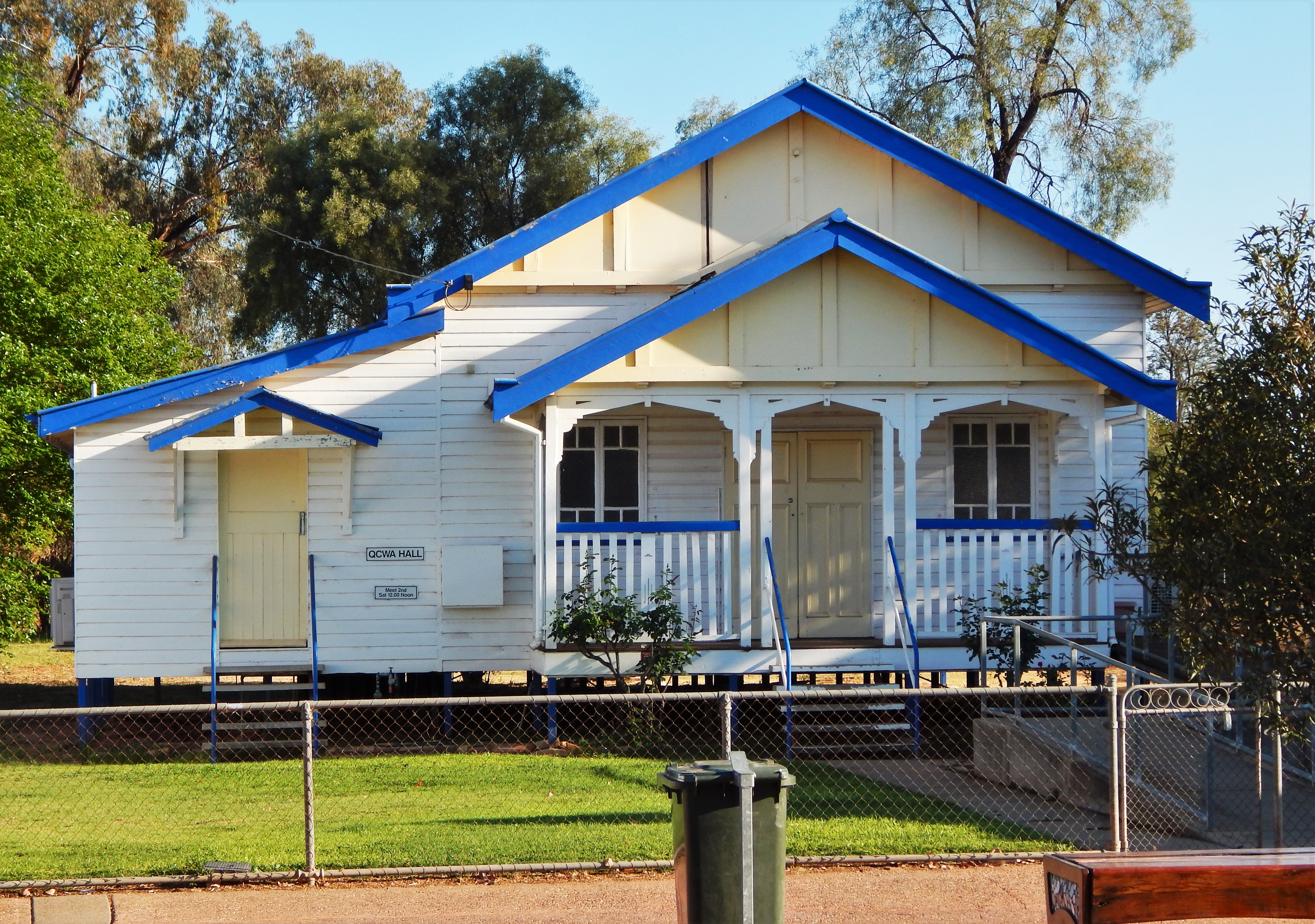
QCWA Hall in Cambridge Street

Mitchell is home to the Booringa Heritage Museum housed in the old Booringa Shire Council workshop building.

The Maranoa Regional Council operates a public library and the Maranoa Art Gallery at the old Maranoa Theatre building in Cambridge Street. From here it provides public Wi-Fi by way of a high speed ISDN Internet Connection (powered through the National Broadband Network) to Brisbane.

St Columba's Catholic Church is at 86 Alice Street (26.482887°S 147.9733°E).

All Saints' Anglican Church is at 118 Alice Street (26.485611°S 147.9745°E).

The Mitchell branch of the Queensland Country Women's Association has its rooms at 87 Cambridge Street.

== Facilities ==
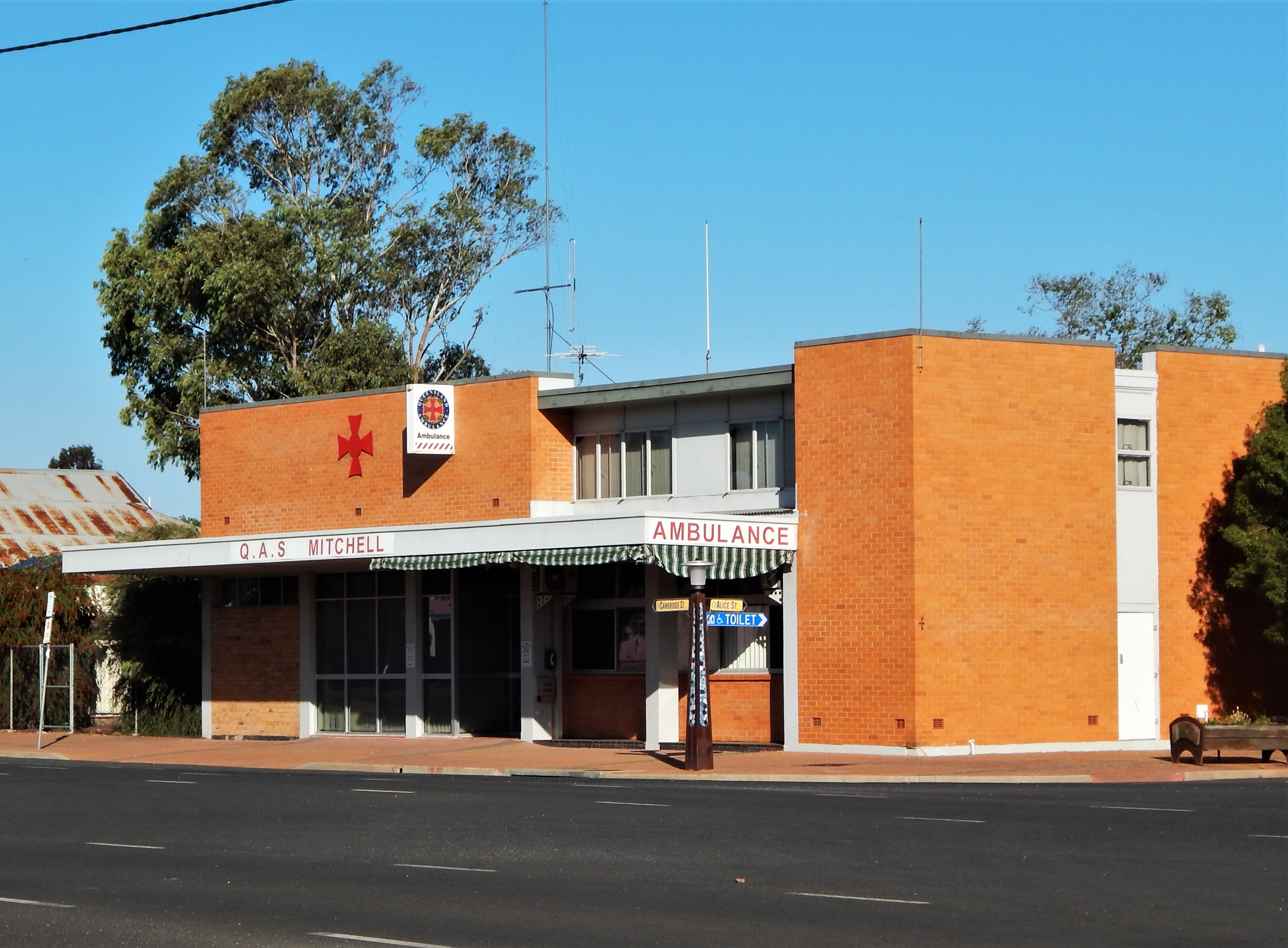
Mitchell Ambulance Station, 2019

Facilities in Mitchell include:

- Mitchell Police Station (26.4883°S 147.9777°E)
- Mitchell Fire Station (26.4862°S 147.9774°E)
- Mitchell SES Facility (26.4890°S 147.9789°E)
- Mitchell Multipurpose Health Service, a public hospital (26.4901°S 147.9722°E)
- Mitchell Ambulance Station (26.4875°S 147.9754°E)
- Mitchell Monumental Cemetery (26.4759°S 147.9709°E)
- Mitchell Water Treatment Plant (26.4917°S 147.9844°E)

== Climate ==
Mitchell has a humid subtropical climate with hot summers and cold winters by Queensland standards. On 15 August 1979 Mitchell recorded a minimum temperature of −9.4 °C (15.1 °F), which is the third coldest temperature ever recorded in the state. Mitchell has the largest overall temperature range recorded in Australia (56.2 °C, -9.4 °C to 46.8 °C). The town gets an average of 157.5 clear days annually.

Climate data for Mitchell
Month	Jan	Feb	Mar	Apr	May	Jun	Jul	Aug	Sep	Oct	Nov	Dec	Year
Record high °C (°F)	46.8 (116.2)	43.0 (109.4)	42.1 (107.8)	36.5 (97.7)	33.0 (91.4)	30.2 (86.4)	29.2 (84.6)	36.2 (97.2)	39.3 (102.7)	40.8 (105.4)	42.7 (108.9)	46.2 (115.2)	46.8 (116.2)
Mean daily maximum °C (°F)	34.1 (93.4)	32.9 (91.2)	31.1 (88.0)	27.5 (81.5)	23.2 (73.8)	19.7 (67.5)	19.4 (66.9)	21.8 (71.2)	25.8 (78.4)	29.4 (84.9)	32.0 (89.6)	33.7 (92.7)	27.5 (81.5)
Mean daily minimum °C (°F)	20.0 (68.0)	19.5 (67.1)	16.8 (62.2)	11.5 (52.7)	7.1 (44.8)	4.3 (39.7)	2.8 (37.0)	3.9 (39.0)	7.5 (45.5)	12.3 (54.1)	16.1 (61.0)	18.5 (65.3)	11.7 (53.1)
Record low °C (°F)	10.1 (50.2)	8.8 (47.8)	4.0 (39.2)	−0.9 (30.4)	−6.4 (20.5)	−6.2 (20.8)	−6.1 (21.0)	−9.4 (15.1)	−3.2 (26.2)	−1.4 (29.5)	3.6 (38.5)	7.5 (45.5)	−9.4 (15.1)
Average rainfall mm (inches)	81.9 (3.22)	72.5 (2.85)	61.3 (2.41)	33.8 (1.33)	32.4 (1.28)	34.4 (1.35)	33.1 (1.30)	23.5 (0.93)	26.4 (1.04)	42.5 (1.67)	58.2 (2.29)	71.9 (2.83)	571.9 (22.5)
Average rainy days (≥ 0.2mm)	7.4	6.1	5.5	3.7	3.8	4.1	4.2	3.3	3.9	5.2	6.3	7.3	60.8
Average relative humidity (%)	35	38	36	36	39	41	37	31	26	28	30	31	34
Source: Bureau of Meteorology

== Attractions ==
The Great Artesian Spa was opened in 1998 and is situated in the town's aquatic centre. There are two pools of artesian water, one heated and the other designed for those who prefer a cooler experience. Both spa pools have been designed with disabled access in mind and facilities include a chairlift to allow easy access for physically disabled people. The water used in the spa pools is renewed regularly and comes from the Great Artesian Basin, which is one of the largest artesian basins in the world, which underlies around one-fifth of Australia. It covers a total area of more than 1,711,000 square kilometres, and has been relied upon for the town water supply since 1927.

Other attractions include:

- Mitchell Yumba Interpretive Trail
- Neil Turner Weir
- The Kenniff Courthouse
- Kenniff Brothers Sculpture at Arrest Creek
- Major Mitchell's Campsite, 38 kilometres north of Mitchell
- Musical Cattle Grid, on the banks of the Maranoa River

There is a Visitor Information Centre located at the Great Artesian Spa complex, next door to the Mitchell Memorial Swimming Pool.

== Notable people ==
- The 15th prime minister of Australia, Francis Forde was born in Mitchell. He is Australia's shortest-serving prime minister, with a term lasting just eight days. He was also Australia's longest-living prime minister, until Gough Whitlam took that mantle.
- Joanne Currie Nalingu, artist

== See also ==
- Mungallala
- Muckadilla
