= Injune =

- Town
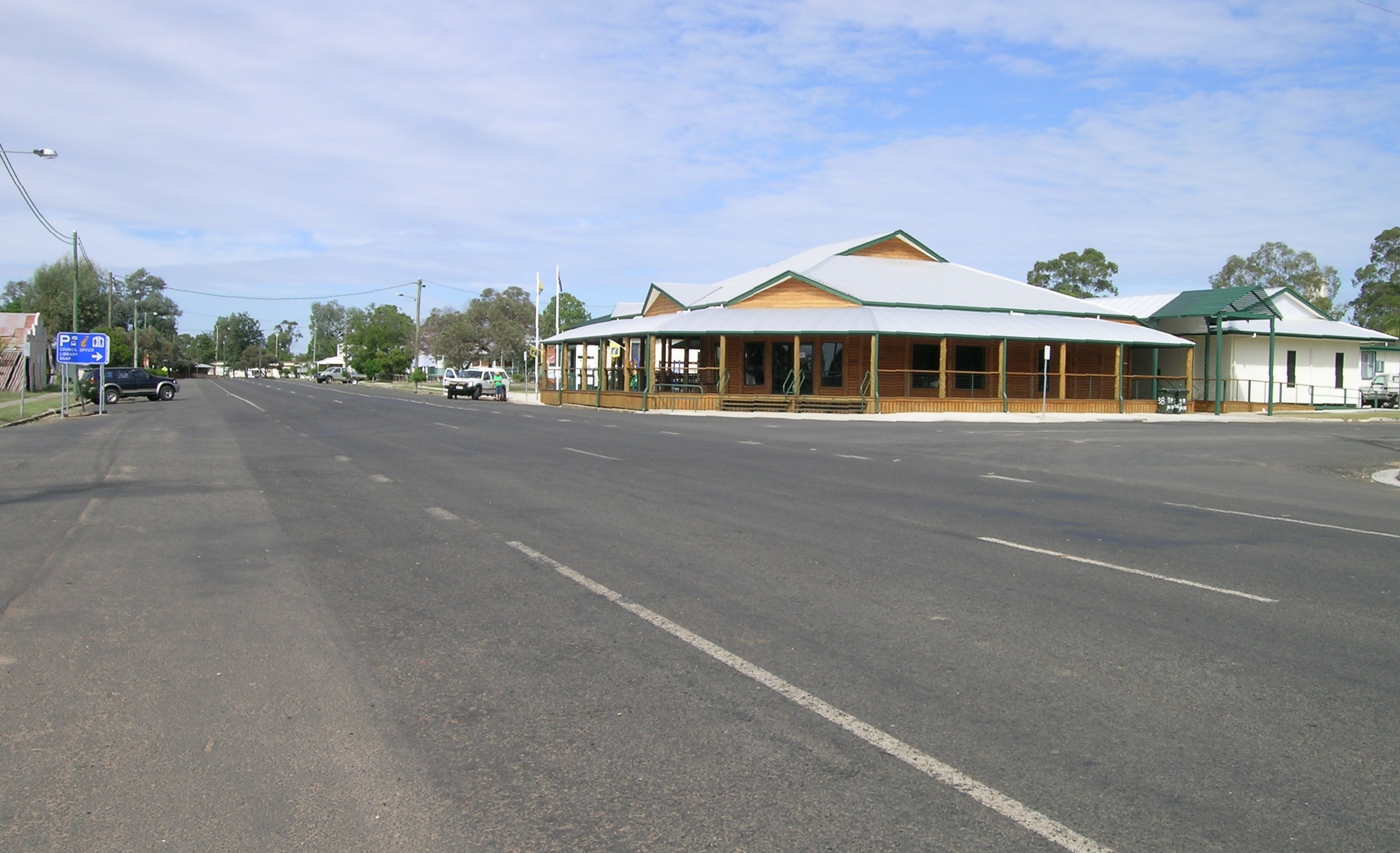
- The information centre at Injune

- Interactive map of Injune
- Coordinates: 25.8430°S 148.5661°E
- Country: Australia
- State: Queensland
- LGA: Maranoa Region
- Location: 90.7 km (56.4 mi) NNW of Roma; 441 km (274 mi) NW of Toowoomba; 616 km (383 mi) WNW of Brisbane

Government
  - State electorate: Warrego
  - Federal division: Maranoa

Area
  - Total: 411.1 km^{2} (158.7 sq mi)
- Elevation: 393 m (1,289 ft)

Population
  - Total: 429 (2021 census)
  - Density: 1.0435/km^{2} (2.703/sq mi)
- Time zone: UTC+10:00 (AEST)
- Postcode: 4454
- Mean max temp: 27.5 °C (81.5 °F)
- Mean min temp: 11.8 °C (53.2 °F)
- Annual rainfall: 630.5 mm (24.82 in)
Localities around Injune
Hutton Creek	Simmie	Simmie
Mount Hutton	Injune	Highland Plains
Mount Hutton	Gunnewin	Gunnewin

Injune /ˈɪndʒuːn/ is a rural town and locality in the Maranoa Region, Queensland, Australia. In the 2021 census, the locality of Injune had a population of 429.

== Geography ==
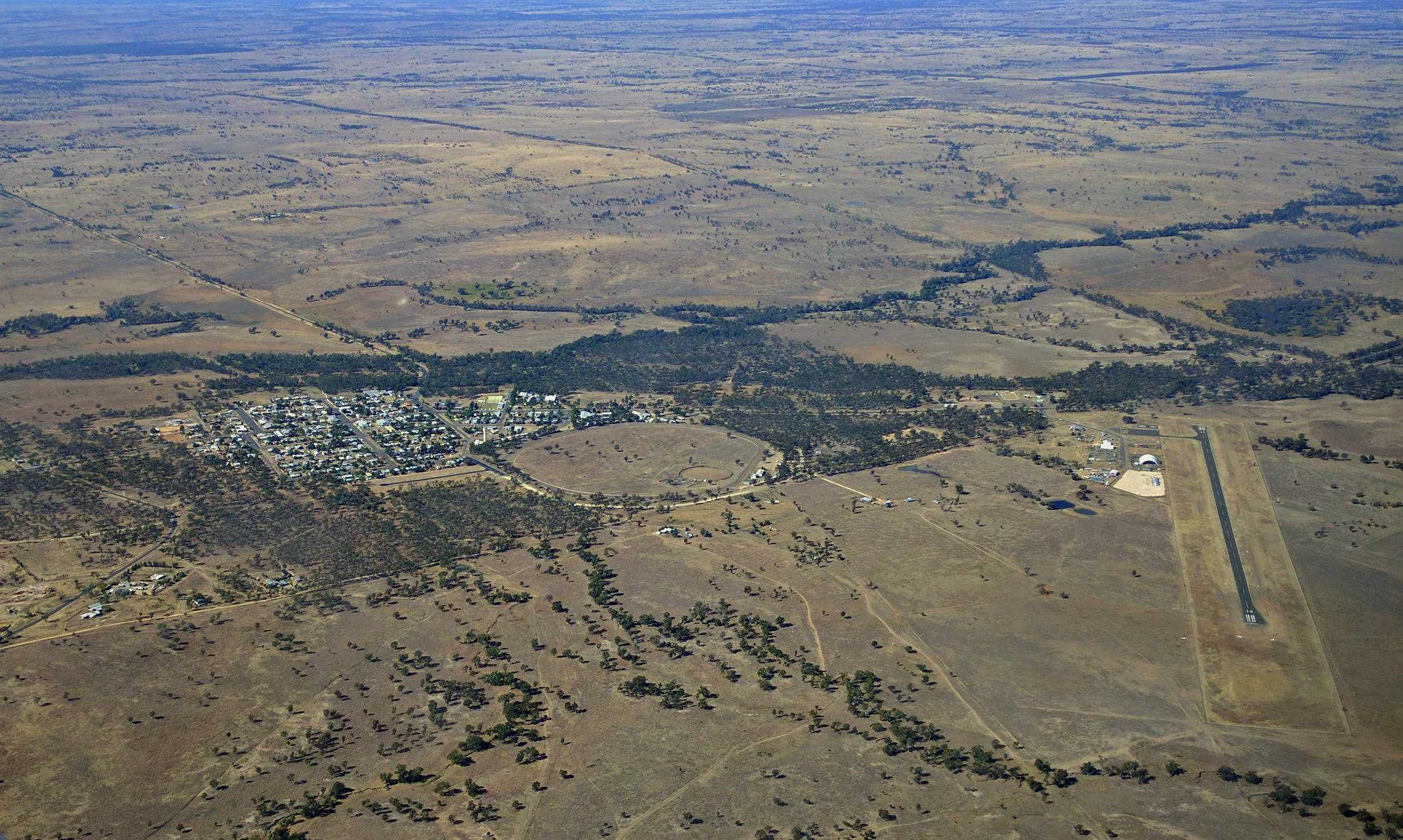
Aerial view of Injune, June 2017

Injune is a small town in South West Queensland. It located on the Carnarvon Highway, 92 kilometres (57 mi)north of the regional centre of Roma.

It was formerly a hub for cattle and dairy industries, but now serves as a staging point for expeditions to the nearby Carnarvon National Park. More recently, natural gas and timber have served as the major primary industries.

== History ==
The Injune railway line opened on 19 September 1916 from Roma to Orallo. It was extended to Injune, opening on 30 June 1920. The last train left Injune on 31 December 1966 and the line closed from 1 January 1967. Although there was still considerable grain traffic, maintenance costs for its many bridges made the line unviable. The line and facilities were completely dismantled by mid 1968.

Injune Post Office opened on 11 August 1920.

Injune State School opened on 24 October 1921.

== Demographics ==
In the 2021 census, Injune had a population of 429.

In the 2016 census, Injune had a population of 461.

In the 2011 census, Injune had a population of 984.

In the 2006 census, Injune had a population of 579.

== Education ==
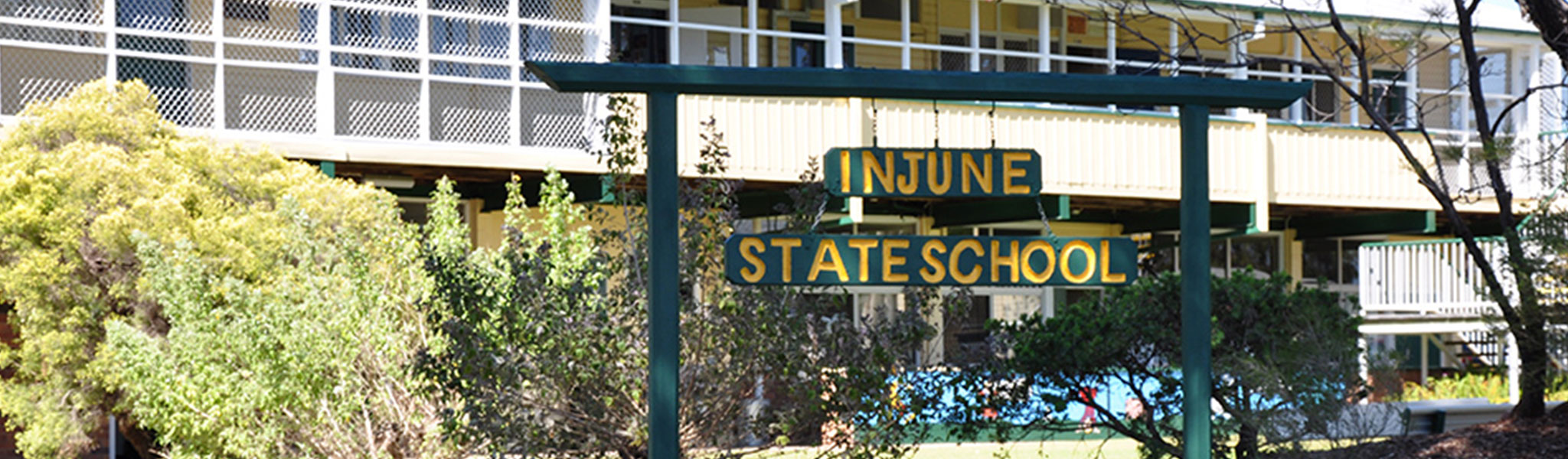
Injune State School, 2025

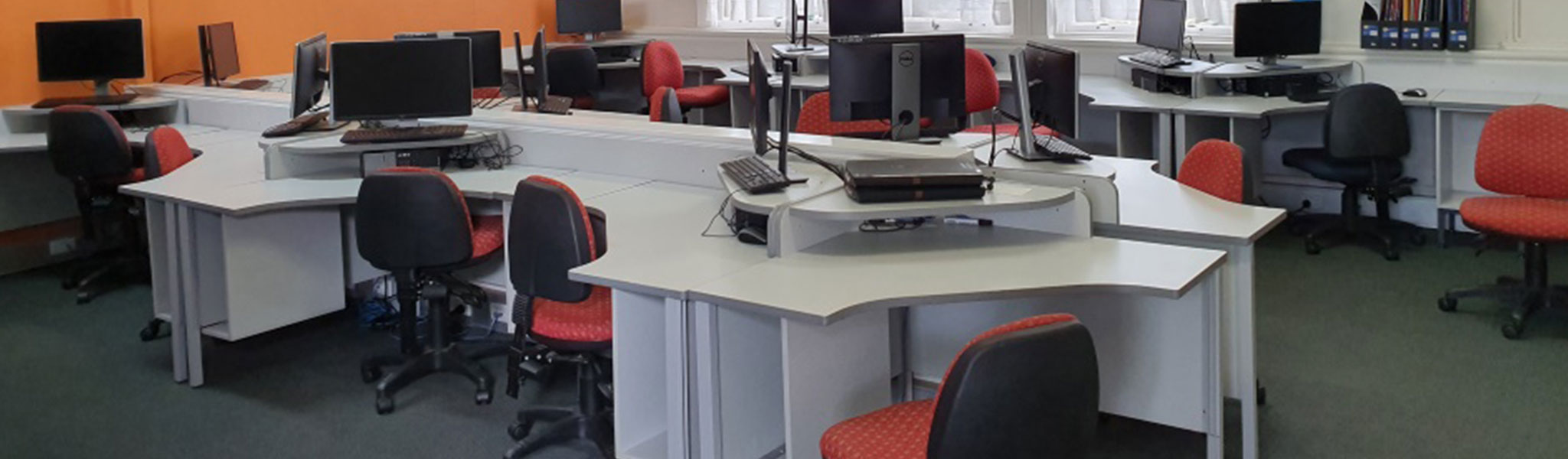
Injune State School classroom, 2025

Injune State School is a government primary and secondary (Prep-10) school for boys and girls on the corner of Hutton Street and Fourth Avenue (25.8467°S 148.5651°E). In 2017, the school had an enrolment of 80 students with 12 teachers and 16 non-teaching staff (7 full-time equivalent). In 2018, the school had an enrolment of 80 students with 14 teachers (12 full-time equivalent) and 15 non-teaching staff (8 full-time equivalent).

As Injune State School only provides education to Year 10, for Years 11 and 12 the nearest government school is Roma State College in Roma to the south.

== Amenities ==
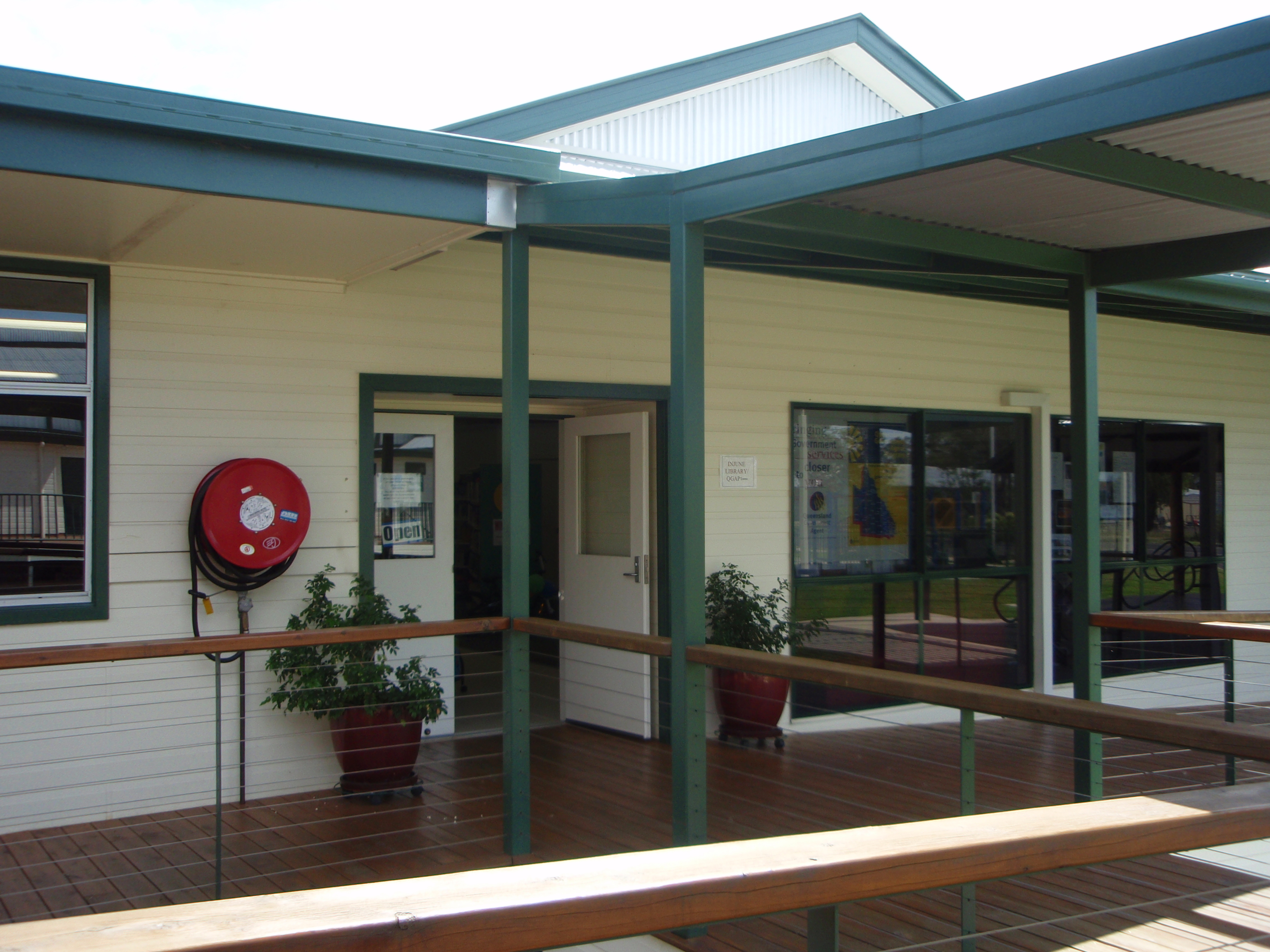
Injune Library, 2011

Injune has a public library at Hutton Street operated by the Maranoa Regional Council.

== Attractions ==
Residents of Injune district have a lively interest in the arts, strongly supported by the former Bungil Shire Council's Arts & Cultural Policy. Injune's local arts group, the Injune Public Space Art Group (IPSAG), is leading the development of Henricks Park as an art and sculpture park opposite the Injune Information Centre.

Injune has an historical railway and steam train precinct. It features Locomotive No. 824 from the Camp Mountain railway accident. The locomotive was repaired and placed back into service, working around South East Queensland. In 1958 it was transferred to Toowoomba, and withdrawn from service in May 1967, exactly 20 years after the accident. At that point, as a donation to the Bungil Shire Council, it was towed to Injune, where it is located behind the town's ambulance station, and is listed in a town map as an "historical steam train".

== Climate ==
Injune has a subtropical climate with warm to hot summers and cool winters with rainfall concentrated in the summer months. A record low temperature of −8.0 °C (17.6 °F) is one of the coldest temperatures recorded in Queensland outside of the Darling Downs and Granite Belt along with the record low in nearby Mitchell.

Climate data for Injune
Month	Jan	Feb	Mar	Apr	May	Jun	Jul	Aug	Sep	Oct	Nov	Dec	Year
Record high °C (°F)	43.8 (110.8)	44.2 (111.6)	41.7 (107.1)	35.9 (96.6)	33.3 (91.9)	32.1 (89.8)	29.5 (85.1)	36.1 (97.0)	40.1 (104.2)	40.5 (104.9)	42.4 (108.3)	44.1 (111.4)	44.1 (111.4)
Mean daily maximum °C (°F)	33.8 (92.8)	32.4 (90.3)	31.0 (87.8)	27.8 (82.0)	23.6 (74.5)	20.5 (68.9)	20.2 (68.4)	22.7 (72.9)	26.4 (79.5)	29.7 (85.5)	31.6 (88.9)	33.3 (91.9)	27.8 (82.0)
Mean daily minimum °C (°F)	19.8 (67.6)	19.1 (66.4)	16.7 (62.1)	11.9 (53.4)	7.7 (45.9)	4.5 (40.1)	3.3 (37.9)	4.5 (40.1)	8.3 (46.9)	12.9 (55.2)	16.1 (61.0)	18.2 (64.8)	11.9 (53.4)
Record low °C (°F)	10.6 (51.1)	9.4 (48.9)	3.6 (38.5)	−0.8 (30.6)	−4.0 (24.8)	−6.7 (19.9)	−8.0 (17.6)	−6.2 (20.8)	−3.3 (26.1)	−0.4 (31.3)	3.1 (37.6)	6.6 (43.9)	−8.0 (17.6)
Average rainfall mm (inches)	86.2 (3.39)	88.1 (3.47)	64.4 (2.54)	44.0 (1.73)	31.9 (1.26)	29.5 (1.16)	29.0 (1.14)	24.7 (0.97)	27.6 (1.09)	48.2 (1.90)	75.4 (2.97)	87.9 (3.46)	636.9 (25.08)
Average rainy days (≥ 0.2mm)	7.7	7.0	5.6	3.8	3.9	3.9	3.8	3.3	3.8	6.0	7.2	8.2	64.2
Source: Bureau of Meteorology
