= Mitchell State School (1914 Building) =

Mitchell State School (1914 building)
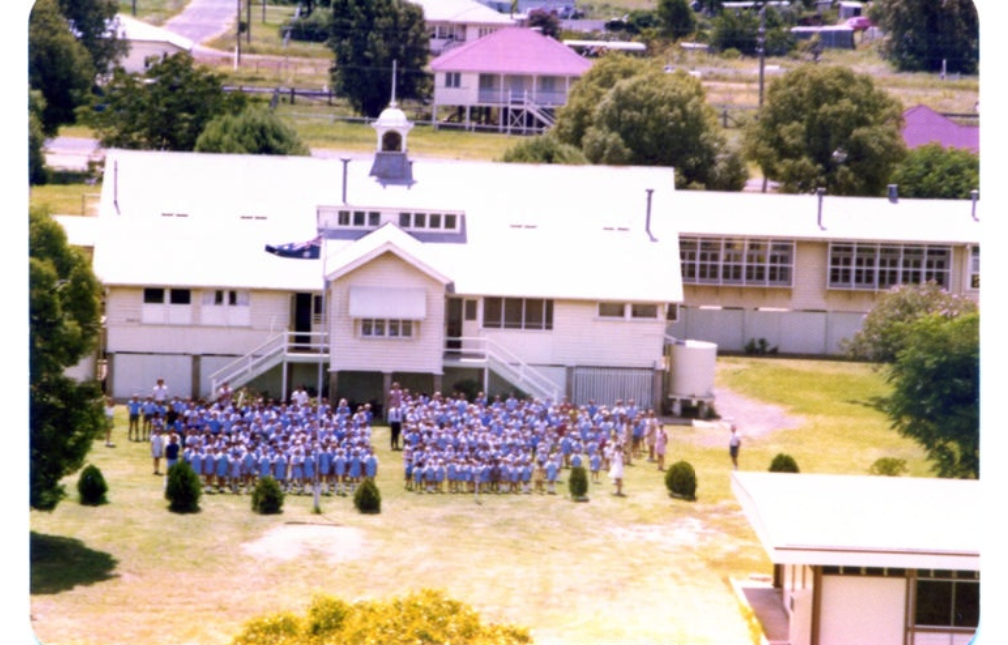
- Mitchell State School (1914 building), 1976

- Location within Queensland Location within Australia
- 26.4880°S 147.9713°E
- Location: 105 Cambridge Street, Mitchell, Maranoa Region, Queensland, Australia

History
- Design period: 1870s–1890s (late 19th century)
- Built: 1913–1920

Site notes
- Architect: Department of Public Works (Queensland)
- Architectural style: Classicism

Queensland Heritage Register
- Official name: Mitchell State School (1914 Building)
- Type: state heritage (built, landscape)
- Designated: 6 June 1994
- Delisted: June 2015
- Reference no.: 601076
- Significant period: 1870s–1910s (historical); 1910s–1920s (fabric); 1913–ongoing (social)
- Significant components: garden/grounds, school/school room
- Builders: G P Williams

Mitchell State School (1914 Building) was a heritage-listed state school building at 105 Cambridge Street, Mitchell, Maranoa Region, Queensland, Australia. It was designed by Department of Public Works (Queensland) and built from 1913 to 1920 by G P Williams. It is also known as the 1914 Building. It was added to the Queensland Heritage Register on 6 June 1994. It was removed from the heritage register in 2017 as it had been demolished as part of an approved development.

== History ==
This timber building was erected in 1914, and replaced a building erected in 1880.

The Mitchell Downs run was taken up during the 1850s. A Post Office opened at Mitchell Downs in 1865, mail services commencing for the surrounding district at this time. The Reserve for the town of Mitchell was gazetted in 1869, on the site of the Mitchell Downs head station, the owners having erected another homestead further west. The Booringa Division was gazetted in 1879 and Mitchell became the administrative centre for the Division and later the Shire of Booringa. The Western Railway line was extended to Mitchell in 1885, and Mitchell consolidated its position as the business centre of the surrounding pastoral district.

A provisional school for 20 pupils was established at Mitchell in 1876. A new school building and residence were completed by contractors Joseph and John Warren for £470 in 1880, by which time there were 66 pupils. The building consisted of 2 rooms with verandahs at the front and rear. The building was raised and reroofed in 1911.

By 1913 the school enrolment numbered just over 200, and complaints were received regarding the inadequacy of the existing building. Plans were prepared, and a new building was mostly completed in 1914 by contractor GP Williams for £1 351. During construction of the new building, lessons were taught in the old residence and the playsheds, and held in the supper room of the Shire Hall during winter. The new building was described as:

"A modern compact wooden building placed on high stumps with area under concreted, and batten enclosed. A glazed partition divides the infants' and main school rooms, both of which are cove-ceiled with stamped metal. Large gable windows, dormer and high verandah lights, give ample lighting and ventilation."

The former school building was sold in 1914. The school residence was removed in 1915, and replaced by the present residence, completed in 1919.

Records indicate that the balance of the building was completed by 1920, in particular, inclusion of the dormer lights and metal ceiling. By the late 1940s the building appears to have been divided into three rooms, and a teachers room added to the south eastern side of the building. Crowded and unsatisfactory teaching conditions by 1950 prompted proposals for major alterations, including the removal of the existing verandah and teachers room and their re-erection on the northwestern side of the building, and an extension to the classroom area at the western end of the building. It does not appear however, that these proposals were ever followed through. A portion of the northwestern verandah was enclosed in 1959 to form a library room, and by the early 1980s the library occupied a large former classroom area.

From the early 1900s, the garden appears to have been a focus of school activity, with mention made of experiments in wheat culture and experimental plot and flower gardens. References to project clubs date from the mid-1940s, and included clubs associated with fruit, vegetables, flowers, bee keeping and poultry.

Accommodation for vocational education classes was provided in 1922, by enclosing a shed in the school yard. In 1949, the school on the Aboriginal reserve was closed, and the building moved to the Mitchell State School where it was converted for domestic science and manual training classes. This building has been removed from the site. Other additions to the school undertaken from the 1950s, have included the erection of additional primary school facilities, the addition of a wing for secondary school classes, the erection of a new building for home economics and manual arts, and a new administration block.

The building was removed from the Queensland Heritage Register in June 2015 having been destroyed.

== Description ==
The 1914 school building, now known as Block A, was located on the school reserve bounded by Oxford, Ann, Margaret and Cambridge Streets. Positioned at the centre of the school complex, the north western verandah of the building formed part of the circulation between newer adjoining buildings.

A single storeyed building elevated on concrete stumps, the school was a timber-framed structure with weatherboard walls and a corrugated iron roof. The former classroom area was rectangular in plan, with verandahs running along the full extent of the longer north western and south-eastern facades. Outside the basic rectangle was the former teacher's room, which was positioned in the centre of the south-eastern facade abutting the adjacent verandah. A large gable roof covered the classrooms and verandahs while a smaller gable, protruding from the centre of the main roof, covers the former teacher's room. An ornate ventilator was mounted centrally on the ridge of the main roof. Below the ventilator on both sides of the roof were banks of dormer windows. A number of roof lights were added to the roof.

The former teacher's room wa accessed from the south-eastern verandah. On both sides of this room were external timber staircases which connect the elevated verandah with the ground. The south-eastern verandah was later enclosed with small rooms built into both ends. A single timber staircase led to the centre of the north western verandah which was partly enclosed.

Casement windows, positioned symmetrically in the gable ends, were protected by timber framed awnings. The former classroom area featured a coved pressed metal ceiling.

The concrete play area under the building was partly enclosed by corrugated iron screen walls and timber battens.

== Heritage listing ==
Mitchell State School (1914 Building) was listed on the Queensland Heritage Register on 6 June 1994 having satisfied the following criteria.

The place is important in demonstrating the evolution or pattern of Queensland's history.

The 1914 building was the earliest remaining school building in Mitchell.

The place is important in demonstrating the principal characteristics of a particular class of cultural places.

The timber architecture was typical in both layout and detail of early 20th century classroom accommodation designed by the Queensland Works Department.

The place has a strong or special association with a particular community or cultural group for social, cultural or spiritual reasons.

The 1914 building has a strong association with the Mitchell community.

== Delisting ==
In 2011, the Heritage Act was amended to allow destroyed sites to be removed from the Queensland Heritage Register. As at 2017, five sites had been removed, including the 1914 building as it was demolished as part of an approved development.
