= Leichhardt Tree, Taroom =

Leichhardt Tree
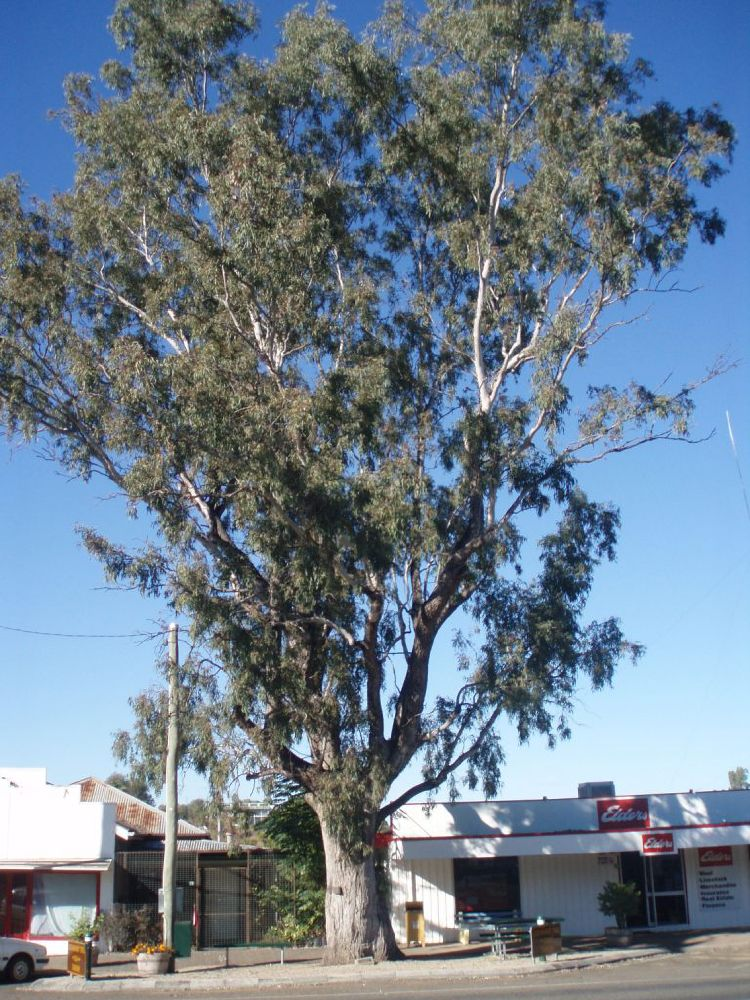
- Leichhardt Tree, 2009

- Location within Queensland Location within Australia
- 25.6413°S 149.7956°E
- Location: Yaldwyn Street, Taroom, Shire of Banana, Queensland, Australia

History
- Design period: 1840s - 1860s (mid-19th century)
- Built: 1844

Queensland Heritage Register
- Official name: Leichhardt Tree
- Type: state heritage (landscape)
- Designated: 21 October 1992
- Reference no.: 600835
- Significant period: 1844 (historical)
- Significant components: memorial - plaque, signage - interpretative
- Builders: Ludwig Leichhardt

Leichhardt Tree is a heritage-listed blazed tree at Yaldwyn Street, Taroom, Shire of Banana, Queensland, Australia. The blaze was made in 1844 by Ludwig Leichhardt. It was added to the Queensland Heritage Register on 21 October 1992.

== History ==
The Leichhardt Tree in Taroom, in the upper Dawson River district, is named for its association with the explorer Friedrich Wilhelm Ludwig Leichhardt, who is thought to have blazed this tree during his expedition north from the Darling Downs to Port Essington (Darwin) in the Northern Territory in 1844–1846.

Leichhardt, born in Prussia in 1813, was a student of philosophy, languages and natural sciences. He journeyed to Sydney in 1841–1842 with the expressed intention of exploring the interior of Australia, and studied the geology and botany of the Sydney district before undertaking exploratory journeys between Newcastle and the Moreton Bay district in 1843–44. By mid-1844 Leichhardt was hoping to join a planned official New South Wales Government expedition from Sydney to Port Essington, but impatient with government delay and uncertain as to whether such an expensive expedition would be given official approval, Leichhardt mounted his own expedition, funded by squatter subscriptions.

Leichhardt and 5 volunteers sailed from Sydney for Moreton Bay, where they were joined by 2 more men, and by another 2 on the Darling Downs. The party left Jimbour Station, on the edge of the settled district of the northern Darling Downs, on 1 October 1844. By early November they had reached Juandah (now Wandoan), where Leichhardt decided to reduce the party by two, these men returning to Jimbour. Continuing north, Leichhardt reached the Dawson River (named by Leichhardt in honour of a Hunter Valley settler), crossing it where the town of Taroom now stands. Of the Dawson Valley, John Gilbert, a naturalist in Leichhardt's party, wrote:

"One of the most beautifully picturesque and extensive scenes met our anxious gaze. The immediate vicinity of the hills was like park scenery - clear undulating hills, with here and there small clumps of brigalo [sic], while the sides of many of the hills were dotted with single scrubs, as if picked out by hand. Beyond this to the westward, and round as far as we could see to the E.S.E was a carpet of evergreens for six or seven miles and then the high ranges rose up and formed a beautiful background to the most pleasing natural picture we have seen."

It is thought that Leichhardt camped on the southern side of the upper Dawson, where Pemberton Hodgson, tracing Leichhardt's track in mid-1845, found 3 large gum trees blazed with the letter "L". The coolibah surviving in Yaldwyn Street, Taroom - with the blaze LL.1844 once visible - may have been one of these trees. In 1916 one L and part of the year 1844 was still discernible, but bark had grown over part of the date and the second L. In the mid-1970s the blaze was just discernible although unreadable, but it is no longer visible.

Leichhardt crossed the Dawson River and stayed at Palm Tree Creek for several days before continuing westwards to Robinson's Creek, then crossed the Ruined Castle Creek area and the Expedition Range to the northwest. In late June 1845, John Gilbert was killed in an attack on the camp by Aborigines, but the remainder of the party survived and reached Port Essington, near Darwin, on 17 December 1845, completing an overland journey of nearly 3,000 miles (4,800 km). They returned to Sydney by ship in March 1846.

Leichhardt's journey, and the explorations of Pemberton Hodgson in 1845, did much to open the way to further non-indigenous settlement in southeastern Queensland. Even before Leichhardt's journal of the expedition was published in 1847, word had spread of the rich pastures of the Dawson River district, encouraging squatters such the Archer brothers (1850) to explore the area more closely. By November 1845, Taroom Station had been taken up, and by the time the Leichhardt pastoral district of 40,000 acres (16,000 ha) was proclaimed in 1854, most of the country had been taken up for pastoral purposes. The township of Taroom developed at the Dawson River crossing at the junction of several squatter tracks - one south to Juandah and crossing the Fitzroy - Murray-Darling watershed to the Darling Downs, one through the Auburn Range to Gayndah, and one southwest to Roma, and developed slowly as a staging post between Roma and Rockhampton. A post office was established at Taroom in 1853, a courtroom gazetted there in 1857, and the town was officially surveyed in 1860.

At least two other blazes have been marked on the Leichhardt Tree. In 1893 the Dawson River flooded, reaching to the base of the Leichhardt Tree in Taroom. This level was marked on the tree, but is no longer visible; also a surveyor's blaze had been marked on the tree by August 1916. In 1925 the Irrigation and Water Supply Department surveyed the area for a proposed dam site, at which point another blaze supposedly was inscribed on the tree - again no longer visible.

By the mid-1970s, the tree had been heavily lopped and was suffering severe insect damage. In 1979 several cavities caused by previous lopping and breakage were plugged and sealed to prevent further rotting, and the tree has successfully regenerated.

On 23 October 1988, a monument was erected by the local historical society and tourism association to celebrate the Bicentenary of Australia and Leichhardt's 175th birthday.

== Description ==
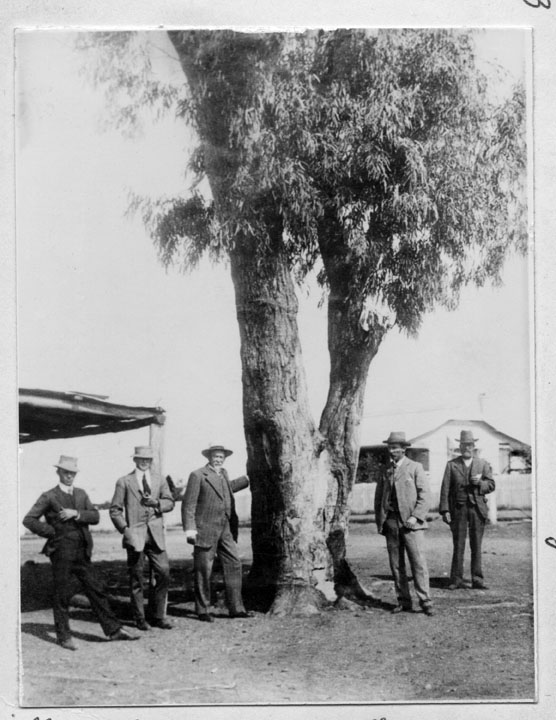
Leichhardt Tree, circa 1914

The town of Taroom is located where the Leichhardt Highway crosses the Dawson River, and the Leichhardt Tree is located about 150 metres (490 ft) up a steadily inclining slope from the bed of the Dawson River, on the west side of Yaldwyn Street reserve in Taroom, between Dawson and Kelman Streets. Yaldwyn Street forms part of the Leichhardt Highway, connecting Roma and Rockhampton, and is the main road in and out of Taroom. Although the tree's root system is largely covered by bitumen road, footpath paving and nearby commercial buildings, the tree appears to be in good condition.

The tree is a mature coolibah (Eucalyptus microtheca), indigenous to the Dawson River district. It has a height of about 14 metres (46 ft), and a canopy spread of about 13 metres (43 ft). Its age is estimated to be at least 300 years.

A sign placed in the branches of the tree reads LEICHHARDT TREE, but all blazes have been overgrown by the bark.

A plaque attached to the tree is inscribed:

Leichhardt, the explorer, passed over this track and marked this Tree in 1844.

At the foot of the tree, facing east to the street, is a small concrete block with a metal plaque attached, on which is inscribed:

THE LEICHHARDT TREE
THE EXPLORER
LUDWIG LEICHHART
MARKED THIS TREE IN 1844 "LL.1844"
DURING HIS OVERLAND JOURNEY
FROM JIMBOUR QUEENSLAND
TO PORT ESSINGTON
NORTHERN TERRITORY
THIS SETTING PROVIDED BY TAROOM LIONS CLUB

== Heritage listing ==
Leichhardt Tree was listed on the Queensland Heritage Register on 21 October 1992 having satisfied the following criteria.

The place is important in demonstrating the evolution or pattern of Queensland's history.

Leichhardt's exploration of the Dawson River area paved the way for rapid pastoral expansion in the Leichhardt district from the mid-1840s to the early 1850s.

The place is important because of its aesthetic significance.

Estimated to be around 300 years old, the Leichhardt Tree is a familiar landmark in the town of Taroom, making a significant contribution to the streetscape of the town, well-known to all residents and often photographed by travellers.

The place has a strong or special association with a particular community or cultural group for social, cultural or spiritual reasons.

Estimated to be around 300 years old, the Leichhardt Tree is a familiar landmark in the town of Taroom, making a significant contribution to the streetscape of the town, well-known to all residents and often photographed by travellers.

The place has a special association with the life or work of a particular person, group or organisation of importance in Queensland's history.

The Leichhardt Tree at Taroom is important for its association with Prussian explorer FW Ludwig Leichhardt, who played an important role in early non-indigenous exploration of the Australian interior, particularly with his epic journey from the Darling Downs to Port Essington, which contributed significantly to European knowledge of the Queensland landscape.
