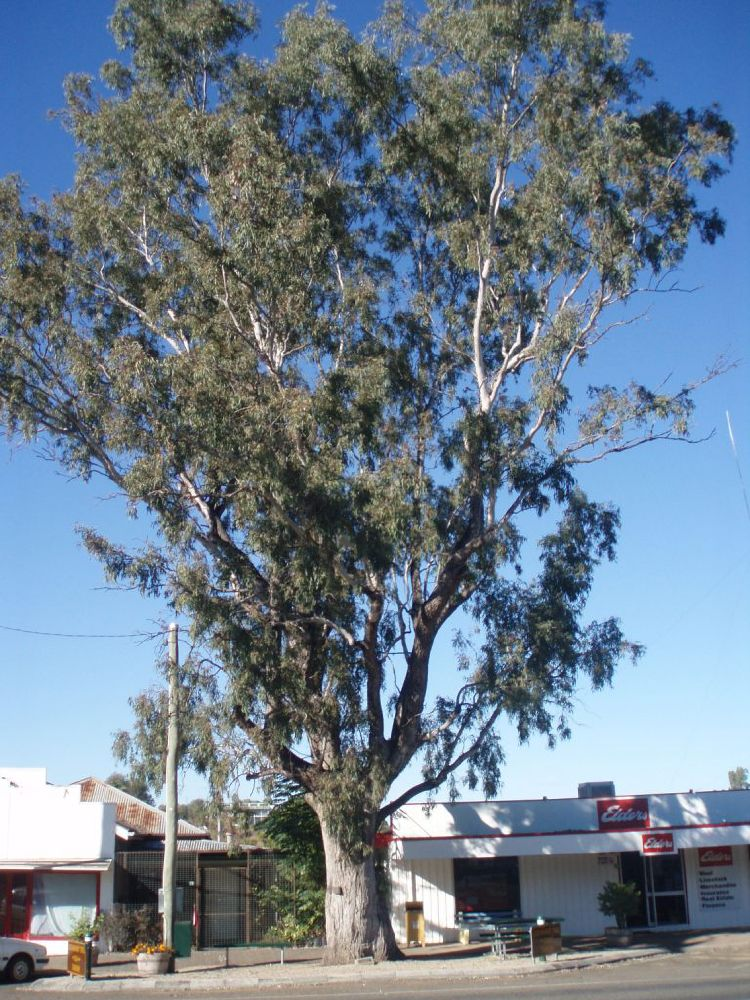
- Leichhardt Tree in Taroom

Scientific classification
- Kingdom: Plantae
- Clade: Tracheophytes
- Clade: Angiosperms
- Clade: Eudicots
- Clade: Rosids
- Order: Myrtales
- Family: Myrtaceae
- Genus: Eucalyptus
- Species: E. microtheca

Binomial name
- Eucalyptus microtheca F.Muell.

Synonyms
- Eucalyptus barklyensis L.A.S.Johnson & K.D.Hill; Eucalyptus cyanoclada Blakely; Eucalyptus helenae L.A.S.Johnson & K.D.Hill; Eucalyptus microtheca var. cymbaliformis Blakely & Jacobs; Eucalyptus microtheca F.Muell. var. microtheca

= Eucalyptus microtheca =

Coolibah

Species of eucalyptus

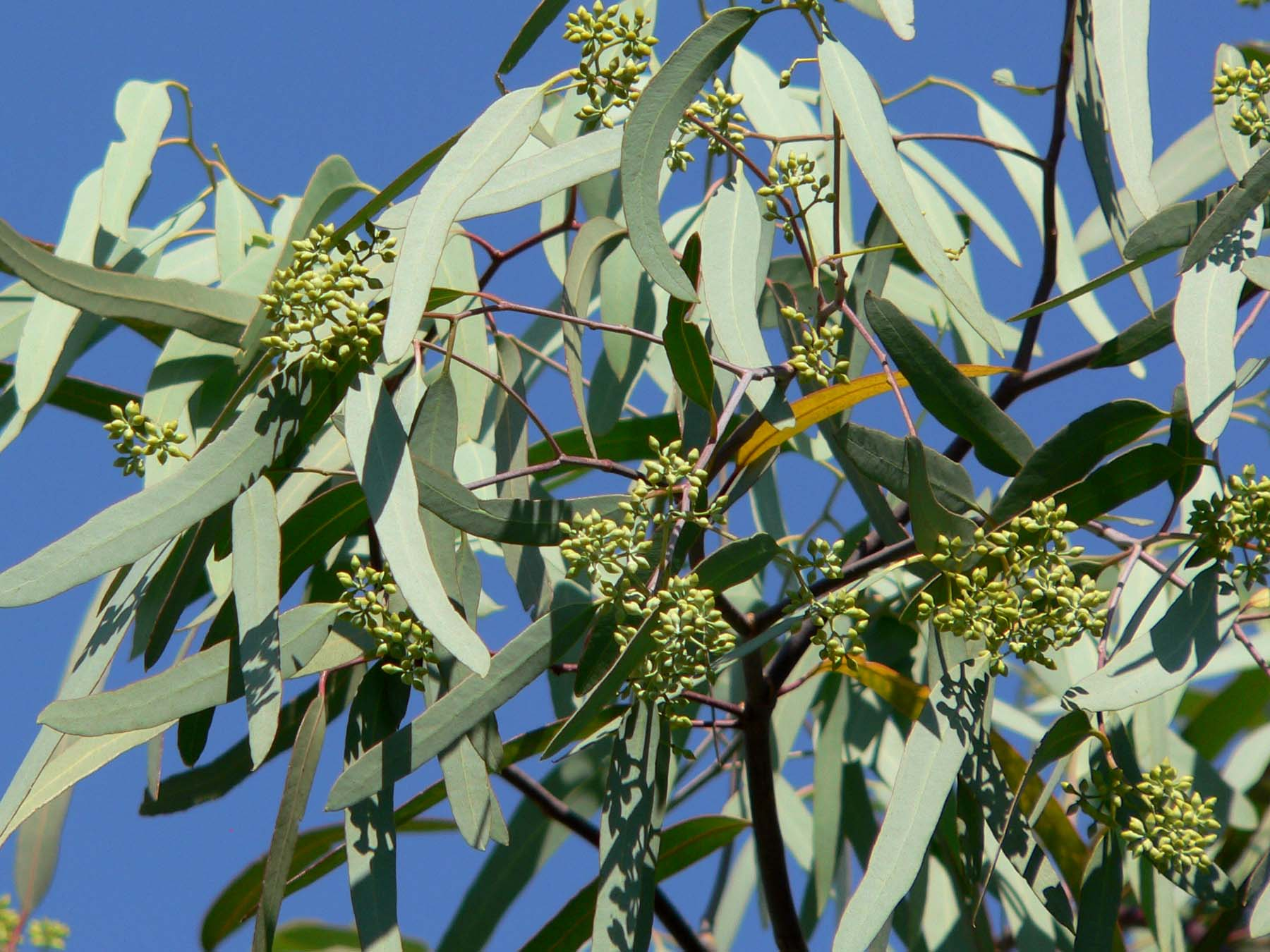
Foliage and flower buds

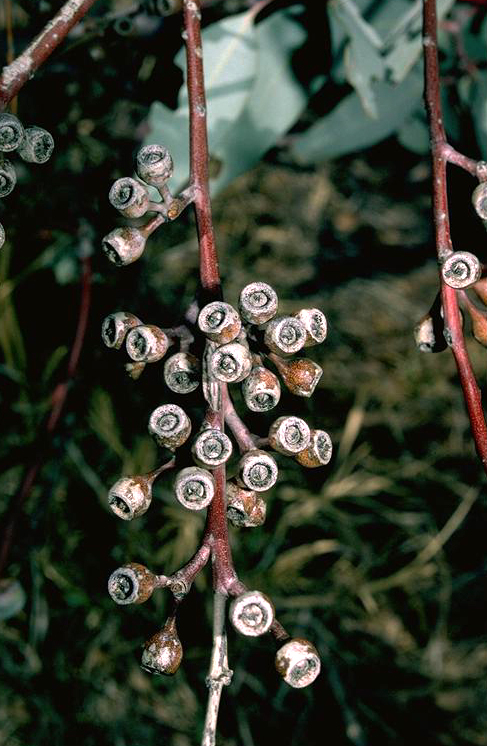
Fruit

Eucalyptus microtheca, with many common names including desert box, coolibah, callaille, targoon, yathoo or coolabah, is a species of tree that is endemic to northern Australia. It has rough, flaky or fibrous bark on the trunk and branches, lance-shaped adult leaves, flower buds in groups of seven, white flowers and spherical to conical fruit. It is widely distributed from the Kimberley region of Western Australia to Cape York in Queensland.

== Description ==
Eucalyptus microtheca is a tree, sometimes a mallee, that typically grows to a height of 5–10 m (16–33 ft) and forms a lignotuber. It has a whitish grey to dark grey, box-type bark that is often deeply fissured, coarsely flaky or tessellated as it ages. Young plants and coppice regrowth have narrow lance-shaped leaves that are 50–150 mm (2.0–5.9 in) long, 5–25 mm (0.20–0.98 in) wide and petiolate. Adult plants have leaves that are the same shade of dull green to bluish on both sides, lance-shaped to curved, 50–195 mm (2.0–7.7 in) long and 6–30 mm (0.24–1.18 in) wide, tapering to a petiole 6–20 mm (0.24–0.79 in) long. The flower buds are arranged on a thin, branched peduncle in groups of seven, the peduncle 2–9 mm (0.079–0.354 in) long, the individual buds on pedicels 1–3 mm (0.039–0.118 in) long. Mature buds are pear-shaped to oval or spherical, 3–4 mm (0.12–0.16 in) long and 2–3 mm (0.079–0.118 in) wide with a rounded operculum with a point in the centre. Flowering occurs between September and January and the flowers are white. The fruit is a woody, shortened spherical or conical capsule 2–5 mm (0.079–0.197 in) long and 3–7 mm (0.12–0.28 in) wide with the valves near rim level.

== Taxonomy and naming ==
Eucalyptus microtheca was first formally described in 1859 by Ferdinand von Mueller in the Journal of the Proceedings of the Linnean Society, Botany, from samples he had collected in 1855 along the Victoria River in the Northern Territory. The specific epithet (microtheca) is from the Greek micro- meaning "small" and thece meaning "a box" referring to the small fruit.

Eucalyptus microtheca is most closely related to the widespread E. coolabah which is found in similar but drier habitats to the south and south-east. It is also closely related to E. victrix which is found in even drier habitats from central Australia west to the Pilbara region of Western Australia.

== Distribution and habitat ==
The tree is distributed widely across northern Australia and mostly found along river banks and in the heavy soils of flood plains. It is the second most widely distributed species in Australia after Eucalyptus camaldulensis.

The species is found waterlogged flats, along the margins of swamps in the Kimberley region of Western Australia. Populations of the tree are scattered through several IBRA regions including Dampierland, Northern Kimberley, Central Kimberley, Ord Victoria plain and Victoria Bonaparte. It is also distributed throughout the top end of the Northern Territory east from the Western Australian border as far north as about Newcastle Waters and through the Barkly Tableland east through the catchment areas of the Roper and McArthur Rivers and into the Gulf Country of Queensland. In Queensland the range of the plant extends from the Gulf Country to western Cape York and south to about Mount Isa.

== Uses ==
Indigenous Australians harvested seeds from E. microtheca as a source of food.

The wood produced by the tree is extremely hard and difficult to work with but is excellent for firewood and makes long-lasting fence posts that resist weathering and insects. The trees have a dense, rounded shape making them wind resistant and useful as windbreaks and to control erosion. They are one of the more commonly planted eucalyptus species in the southwestern United States since they are fast and easy to grow. Able to tolerate full sun, withstand temperatures below freezing and grow in soils with poor fertility makes them easy to grow.

Oils extracted from the leaves and blossom of the plant contain 101 compounds including α-pinene, O-cymen, β-pinene, aromadendrene, α-phellandrene and globulol. Some of the chemicals isolated are utilised in medicinal and food products and others are alternatives to insecticide agents.
