= Taroom =

- Town
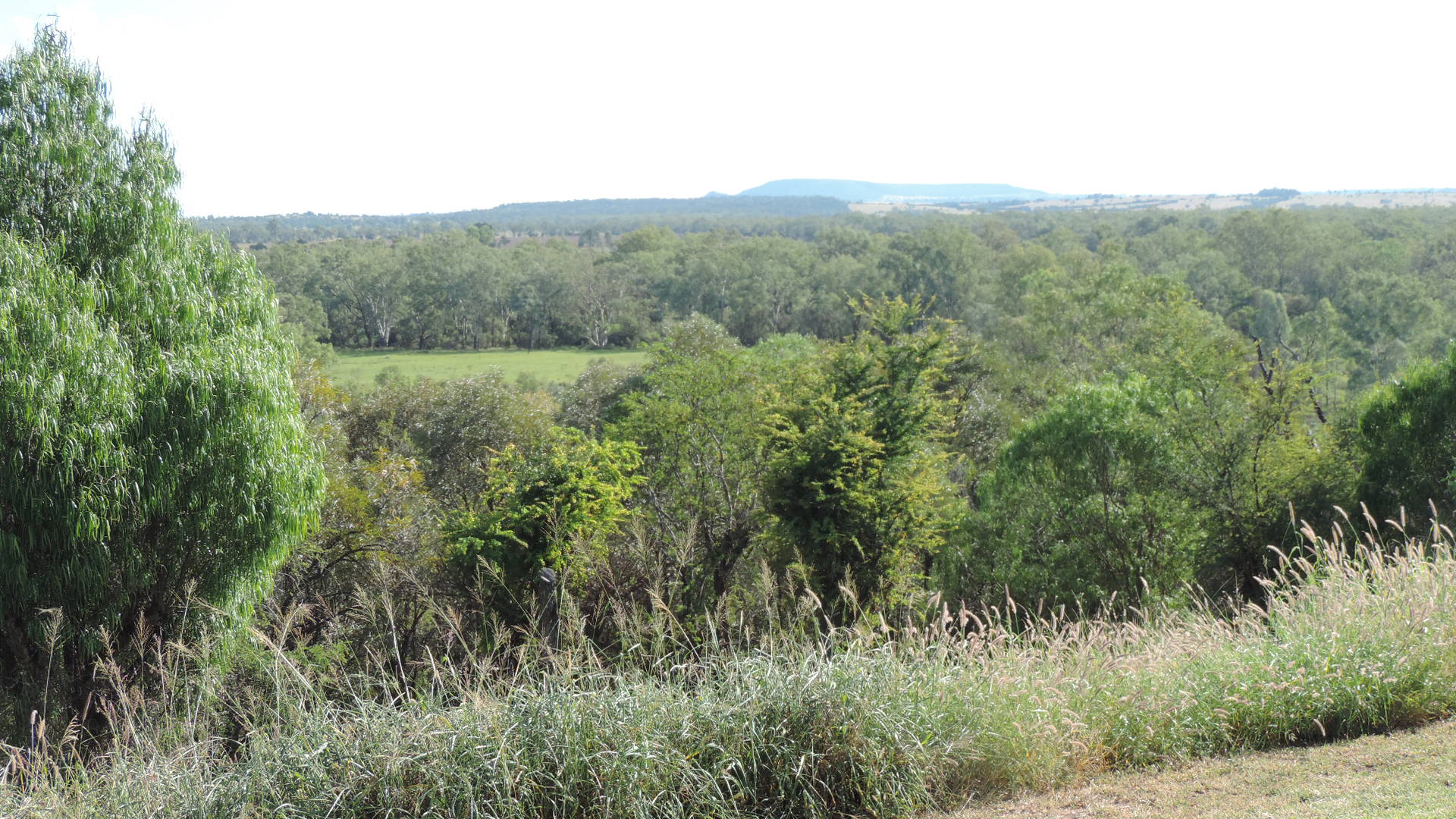
- View towards the north-west from Gilbert's Lookout, 2014

- Interactive map of Taroom
- Coordinates: 25.8266°S 149.8966°E
- Country: Australia
- State: Queensland
- LGAs: Shire of Banana; Western Downs Region
- Location: 128 km (80 mi) N of Miles; 168 km (104 mi) NE of Roma; 199 km (124 mi) SSW of Biloela; 338 km (210 mi) NW of Toowoomba; 465 km (289 mi) NW of Brisbane

Government
  - State electorate: Callide
  - Federal division: Flynn

Area
  - Total: 0.9 km^{2} (0.35 sq mi)

Population
  - Total: 885 (2021 census)
  - Density: 980/km^{2} (2,550/sq mi)
- Postcode: 4420
Localities around Taroom
Gwambegwine	Ghinhinda; Spring Creek	Glebe
Broadmere; Kinnoul	Taroom	Cockatoo
Eurombah	Grosmont	Bungaban

Taroom /təˈruːm/ is a town in the Shire of Banana and locality split between the Shire of Banana and the Western Downs Region in Queensland, Australia. In the 2021 census, Taroom had a population of 885 people.

== Geography ==
The town is located on the Dawson River and the Leichhardt Highway, 380 kilometres (240 mi) north-west of the state capital, Brisbane, 300 kilometres (186 mi) west of Maryborough, 261 kilometres (162 mi) South-west of Rockhampton and 302 kilometres (188 mi) from Toowoomba.

The Leichhardt Highway runs through from south to north, and the Roma-Taroom Road enters from the south-west.

=== Climate ===
Climate data for Taroom Post Office (1991–2020 normals, extremes 1957–present)
Month	Jan	Feb	Mar	Apr	May	Jun	Jul	Aug	Sep	Oct	Nov	Dec	Year
Record high °C (°F)	45.3 (113.5)	44.6 (112.3)	42.2 (108.0)	36.9 (98.4)	34.7 (94.5)	33.0 (91.4)	30.0 (86.0)	37.0 (98.6)	41.4 (106.5)	41.2 (106.2)	42.8 (109.0)	44.0 (111.2)	45.3 (113.5)
Mean daily maximum °C (°F)	34.7 (94.5)	33.5 (92.3)	32.4 (90.3)	29.3 (84.7)	25.4 (77.7)	22.2 (72.0)	22.0 (71.6)	24.3 (75.7)	28.0 (82.4)	30.7 (87.3)	32.6 (90.7)	33.9 (93.0)	29.1 (84.4)
Daily mean °C (°F)	28.0 (82.4)	27.1 (80.8)	25.5 (77.9)	21.8 (71.2)	17.6 (63.7)	14.6 (58.3)	13.9 (57.0)	15.6 (60.1)	19.7 (67.5)	22.9 (73.2)	25.4 (77.7)	27.0 (80.6)	21.6 (70.9)
Mean daily minimum °C (°F)	21.3 (70.3)	20.8 (69.4)	18.6 (65.5)	14.2 (57.6)	9.9 (49.8)	7.0 (44.6)	5.8 (42.4)	7.0 (44.6)	11.4 (52.5)	15.2 (59.4)	18.2 (64.8)	20.1 (68.2)	14.1 (57.4)
Record low °C (°F)	12.6 (54.7)	11.1 (52.0)	7.2 (45.0)	2.9 (37.2)	−3.3 (26.1)	−4.6 (23.7)	−5.6 (21.9)	−4.0 (24.8)	−2.8 (27.0)	2.2 (36.0)	5.2 (41.4)	8.7 (47.7)	−5.6 (21.9)
Average precipitation mm (inches)	88.7 (3.49)	94.5 (3.72)	55.1 (2.17)	25.9 (1.02)	24.8 (0.98)	33.4 (1.31)	18.2 (0.72)	26.9 (1.06)	34.8 (1.37)	61.4 (2.42)	60.3 (2.37)	91.0 (3.58)	614.9 (24.21)
Average precipitation days (≥ 1 mm)	5.6	5.6	4.0	2.6	2.8	3.3	2.6	2.6	3.3	5.2	5.9	6.9	50.3
Average dew point °C (°F)	18.1 (64.6)	18.5 (65.3)	16.5 (61.7)	13.2 (55.8)	10.4 (50.7)	8.2 (46.8)	6.7 (44.1)	6.5 (43.7)	9.2 (48.6)	11.8 (53.2)	14.5 (58.1)	16.8 (62.2)	12.5 (54.5)
Source 1: National Oceanic and Atmospheric Administration
Source 2: Bureau of Meteorology

== History ==
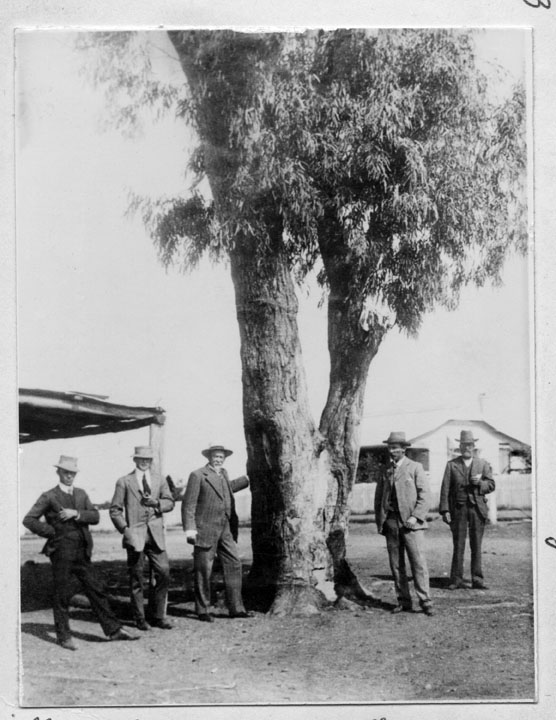
Leichhardt's Tree at Dawson River, Taroom, circa 1914

Prussian explorer Ludwig Leichhardt passed through the district in 1844, carving his initials and date on a coolibah tree that now stands in the centre of town.

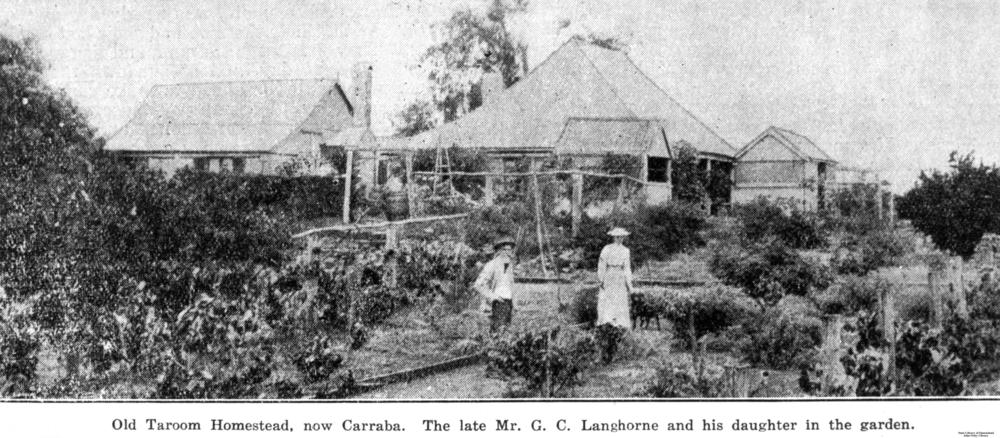
Taroom cattle station, circa 1885

The name Taroom is said to be an aboriginal Waka word tarum meaning wild lime.

The town was surveyed by Clarendon Stuart in 1860.

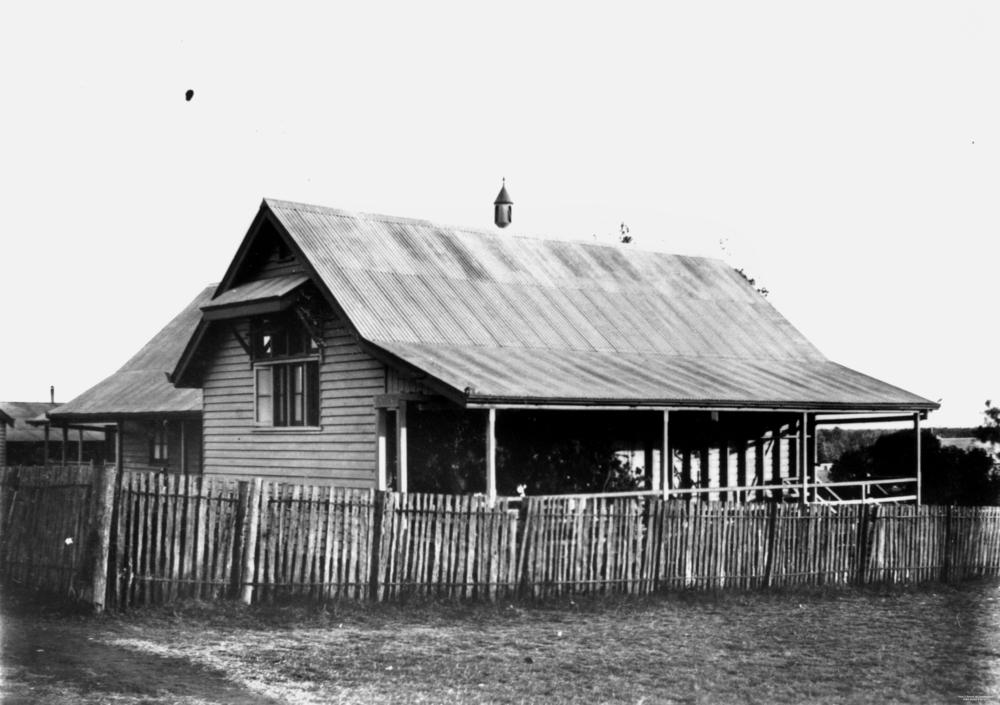
Taroom State School, circa 1912

Taroom State School opened on 11 April 1871 as a primary school. In 1964, the school had a secondary department added to provide secondary education to Year 10.

In 1883, Taroom police officer William O'Dwyer was killed after being struck in the head with a tomahawk by a man he was attempting to arrest near Wandoan. The suspect was immediately shot dead by an accompanying police constable. O'Dwyer died from his injuries thirty minutes after being struck, and was buried at Wandoan. A plaque was unveiled on 7 September 2012 by Assistant Police Commissioner Paul Wilson on a rock in front of the Taroom Police Station to commemorate O'Dwyer being killed in the line of duty.

St Mary's Catholic Primary School opened in May 1921. In April 2015, the Catholic Education office in Toowoomba announced that it would be closing St Mary's School in Taroom on 26 June 2015. The closure of St Mary's means St John's School in Roma and St Joseph's School in Chinchilla became the closest Catholic schools to Taroom. The principal of St Mary's said he was not allowed to publicly comment about the matter but the executive director of Catholic Education in Toowoomba said in a statement the decision to close the school was made with "careful consideration".

Taroom Aboriginal Mission operated until 1927, when it was closed and its residents moved to Woorabinda, Queensland.

In the 1972 Taroom explosion, three men were killed when a stationary truck carrying ammonium nitrate which had caught fire exploded on the Taroom-Bauhinia Road, north-west of Taroom. The three men included the driver and two brothers from a nearby property who had ridden up to the burning truck on motorbikes to assist with the initial fire, which was believed to have been caused by a fault with the truck's electrical system. As the three men were standing near the truck, a significant explosion occurred which burnt out more than 2,000 acres of surrounding bushland, uprooted trees and left a deep crater in the ground where the burning truck had been parked. It was reported that the explosion was so loud that it was heard in Moura and Theodore with debris from the destroyed truck scattered up to two kilometres away. A memorial to the three men was unveiled in Taroom, which led to another one being erected at the accident site in 2013.

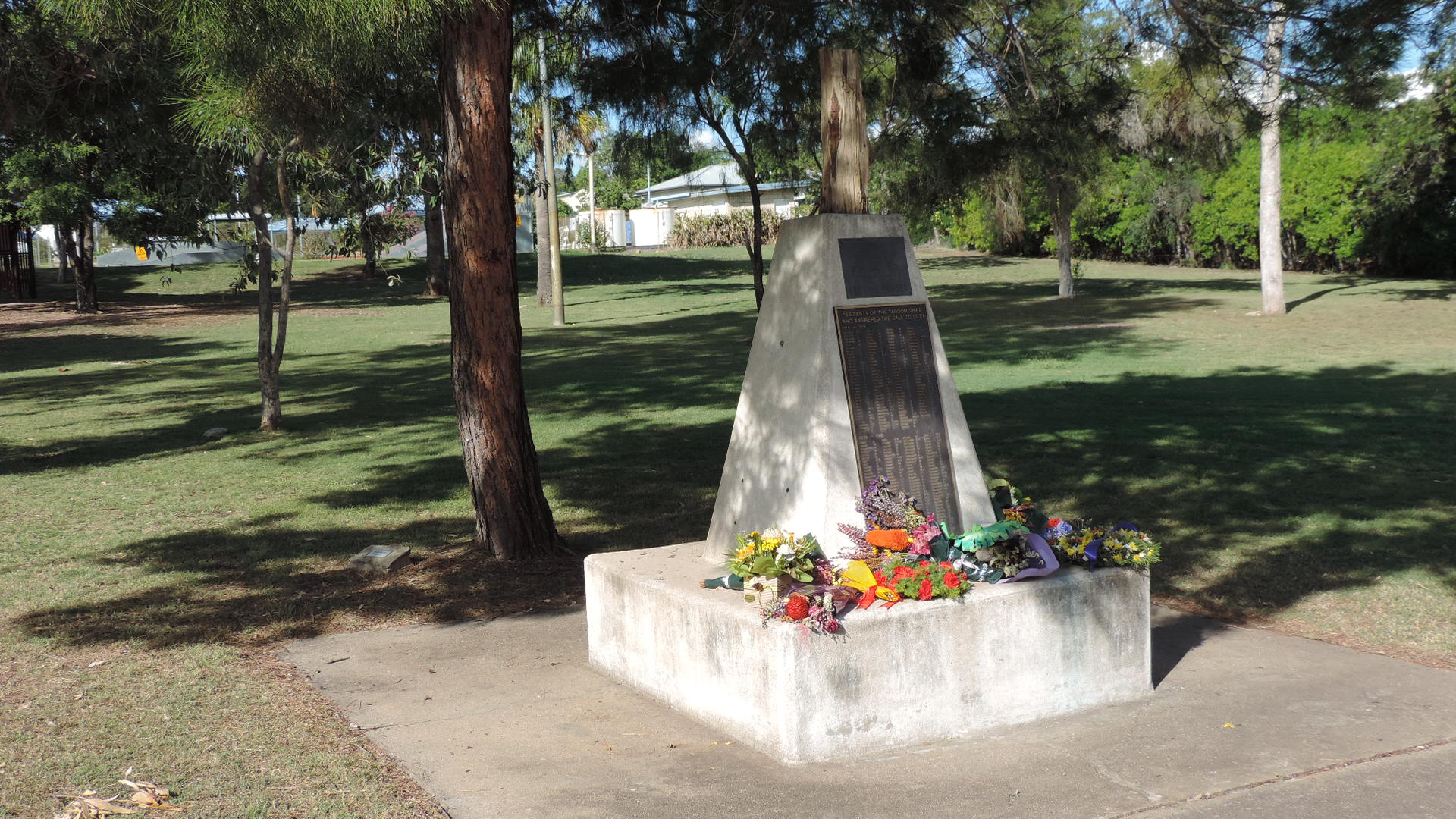
War memorial, Taroom, 2014

The Taroom War Memorial commemorates residents of Taroom Shire who served in World War I, World War II and the Vietnam War. It is located at the Ludwig Leichhardt Park in Yaldwyn Street and was dedicated in about 1973.

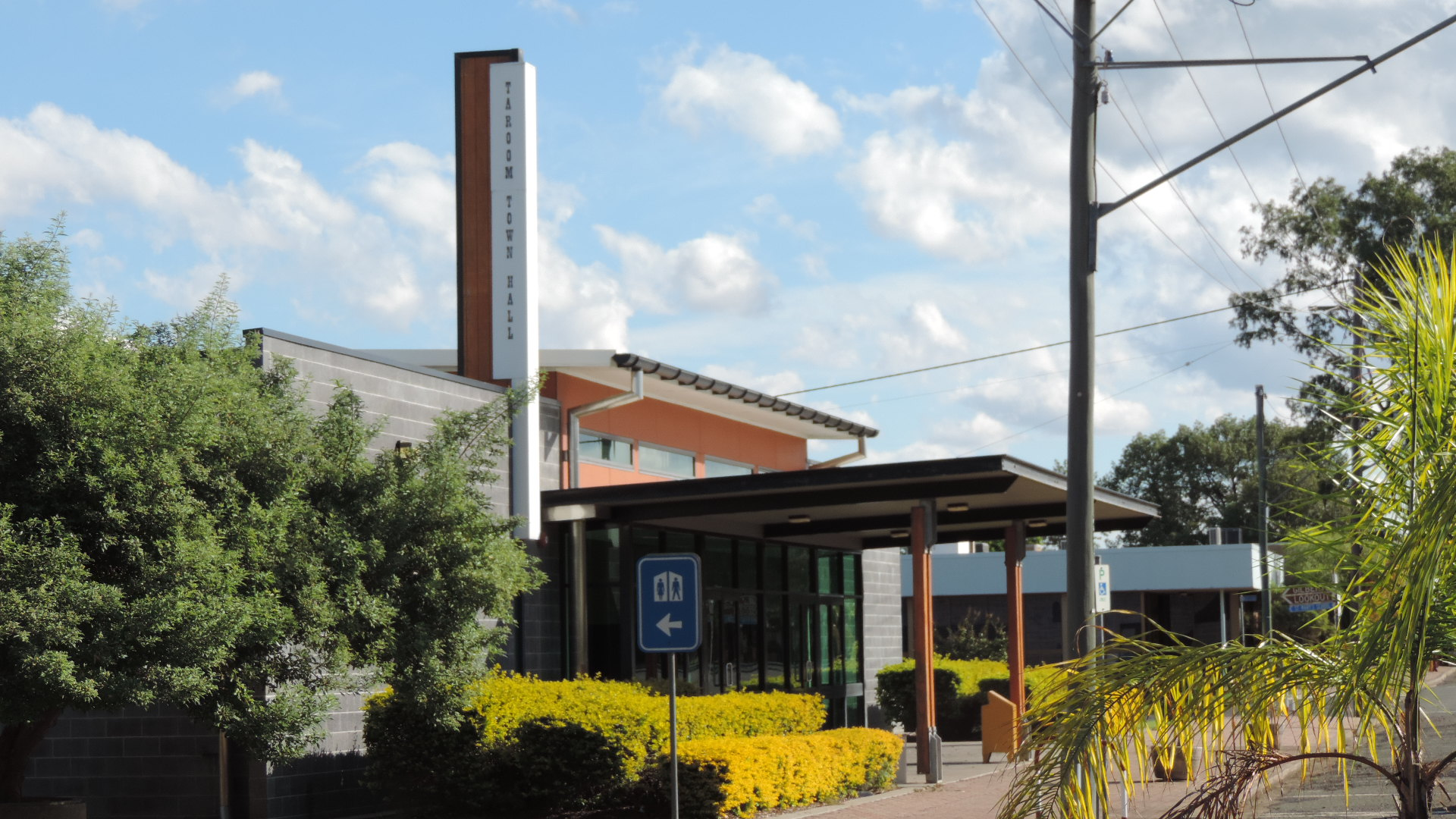
Taroom town hall, 2014

The Taroom Town Hall was built in 2004, immediately next door to the shire council chambers. It was intended to serve as a civic and recreational centre for the town and has a main auditorium that seats 300 people as well as a commercial kitchen and bar. The hall was awarded a regional commendation by the Royal Australian Institute of Architects in 2004.

The current Taroom Public Library opened in 1976.

Taroom made national news headlines in December 2014 when a man and two children were found near the town after being missing for eleven days. The trio, consisting of Steve Van Lonkhuyzen and his two young sons, had departed the Brisbane suburb of Lota on 11 December 2014 for a road journey to Cairns when they became stranded in Expedition National Park north-west of Taroom, after their four-wheel-drive vehicle became bogged. The Queensland Police Service appealed to the public to help locate the father and his two sons after they were reported missing when they failed to reach Cairns as scheduled on 15 December 2014. The last known communication from the man was a phone call made from Taroom. A local Taroom grazier eventually located the trio on 21 December 2014 while he was searching the national park looking for them after seeing media reports about their disappearance and realising he had witnessed their vehicle enter the national park several days earlier. It was reported they had survived by collecting rainwater and eating mouldy bread. The two boys were admitted to Taroom Hospital as a precautionary measure due to malnutrition.

On 29 September 2018, Taroom & District Historical Society Inc and Taroom RSL Sub Branch worked together to preserve the 1973 War Memorial by moving it from Ludwig Leichhardt Park to the Taroom Museum at 17 Kelman Street, Taroom (on the original site of the Taroom State School 1871–1956). A new war memorial was erected in the park on 18 August 2019 (Vietnam Veterans Remembrance Day).

== Local government ==
Taroom was part of the Shire of Taroom until the local government amalgamations of 2008 resulted in the Shire of Taroom being split with the northern part (including Taroom itself) becoming part of the Shire of Banana and the southern part becoming part of the Dalby Region, later renamed Western Downs Region.

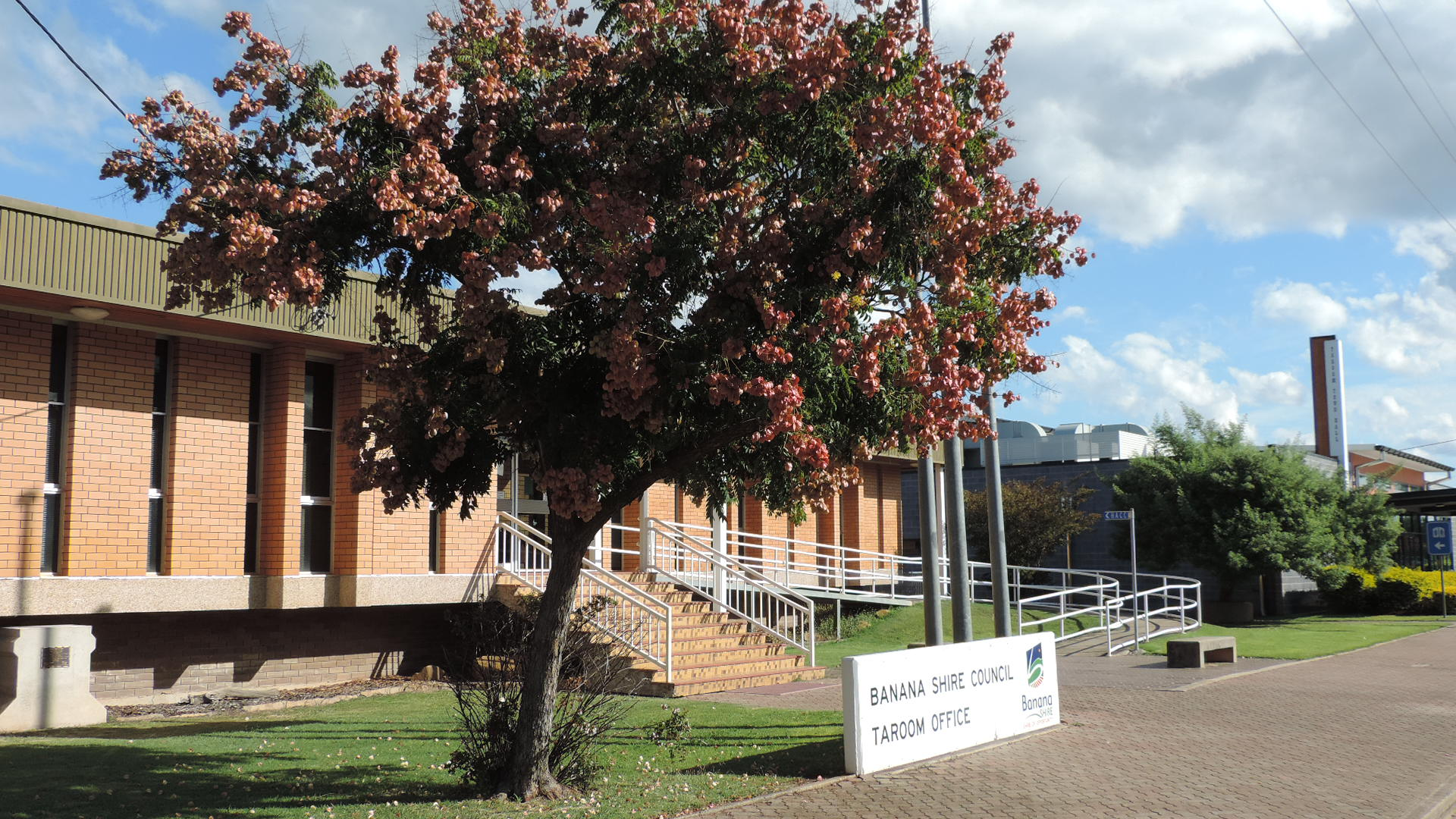
Banana Shire Council offices, Taroom, 2014

The Banana Shire Council has an administration office in Yaldwyn Street; this building is the former Taroom Shire Council Chambers.

The last person to hold the position of Taroom Shire Council mayor, Don Stiller, was critical of the decision to place Taroom into the Banana Shire. In 2011, he said the town would have been much better off had it been incorporated into the Western Downs Regional Council area, which concurred with previous statements by State Member for Callide Jeff Seeney who had described the decision to make Taroom a part of Banana Shire as "outrageous".

However, Western Downs Regional Council mayor Ray Brown did not support Don Stiller's viewpoint, stating that his priority was to deal with issues in his existing council area and was not interested in looking at any proposed changes to council boundaries that would bring Taroom into the Western Downs Regional Council area.

== Education ==
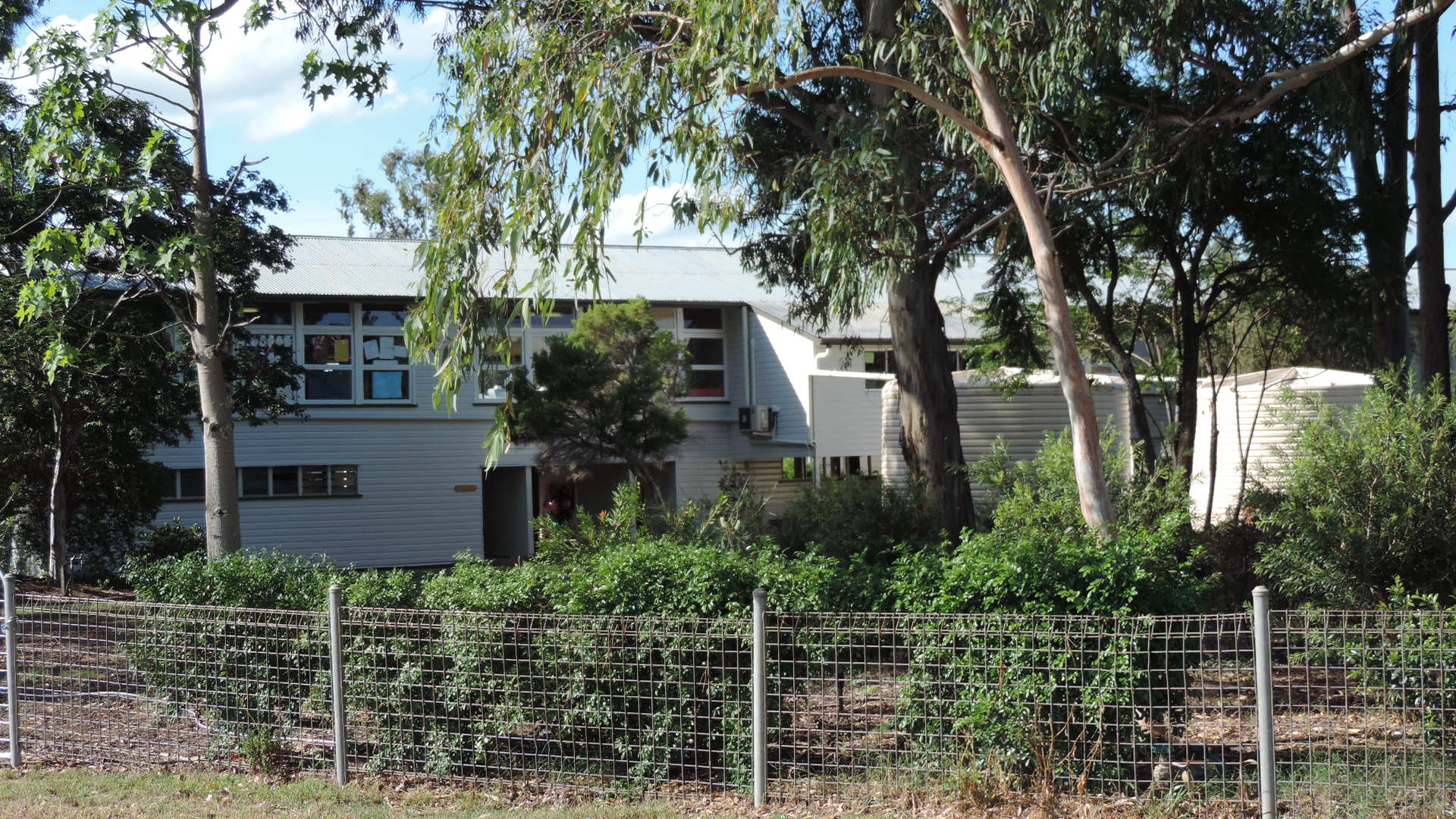
Taroom P–10 State School, 2014

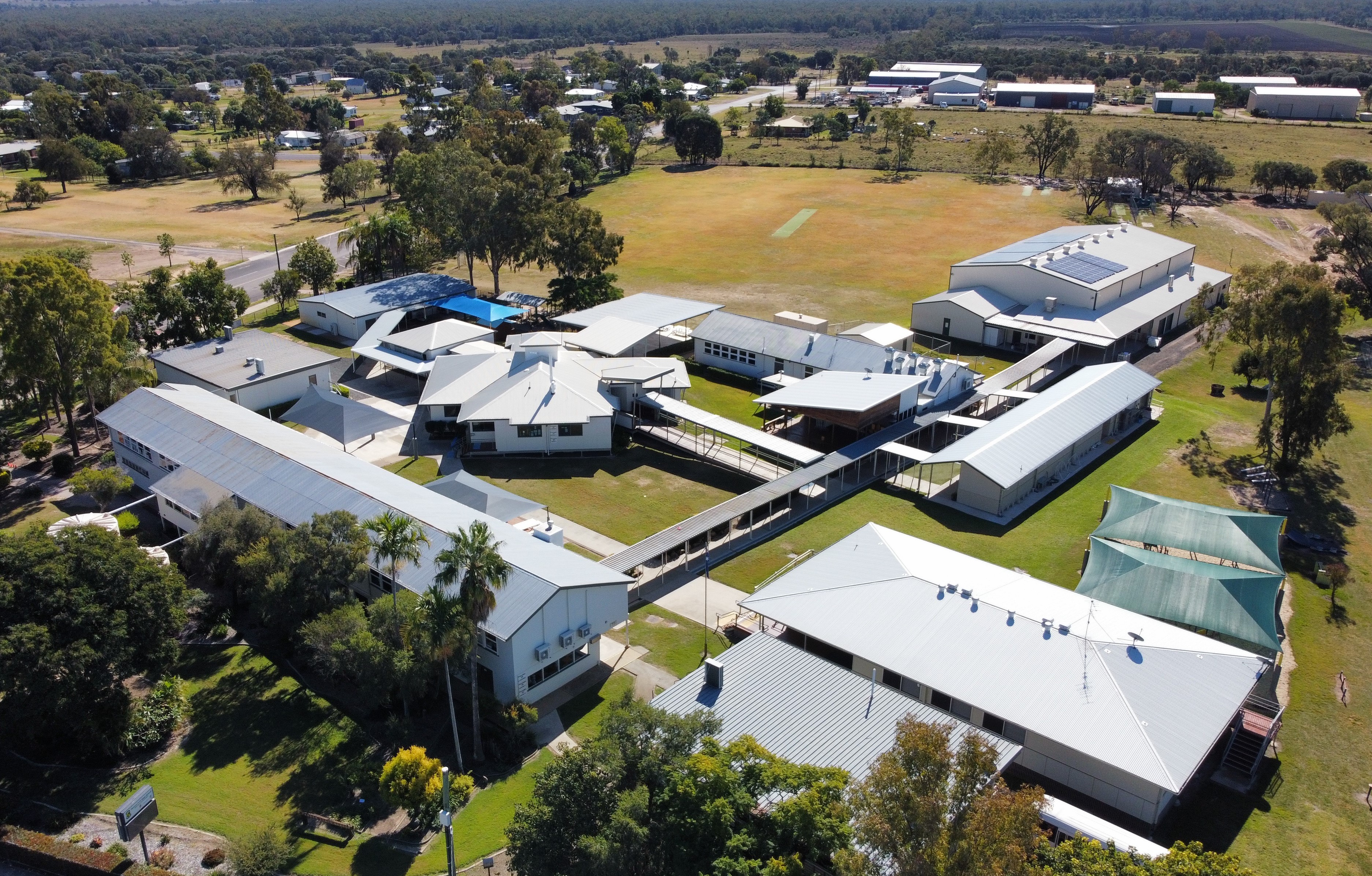
Taroom State School, 2024

Taroom State School is a government primary and secondary (Prep to Year 10) school for boys and girls at Wolsey Street (25.6389°S 149.8005°E). In 2018, the school had an enrolment of 157 students with 18 teachers (16 full-time equivalent) and 11 non-teaching staff (9 full-time equivalent).

There are no secondary schools providing education to Year 12 in or near Taroom. The alternatives are distance education and boarding school.

== Facilities ==
Banana Shire Council operates a library at 24 Yaldwyn Street.

== Tourism ==
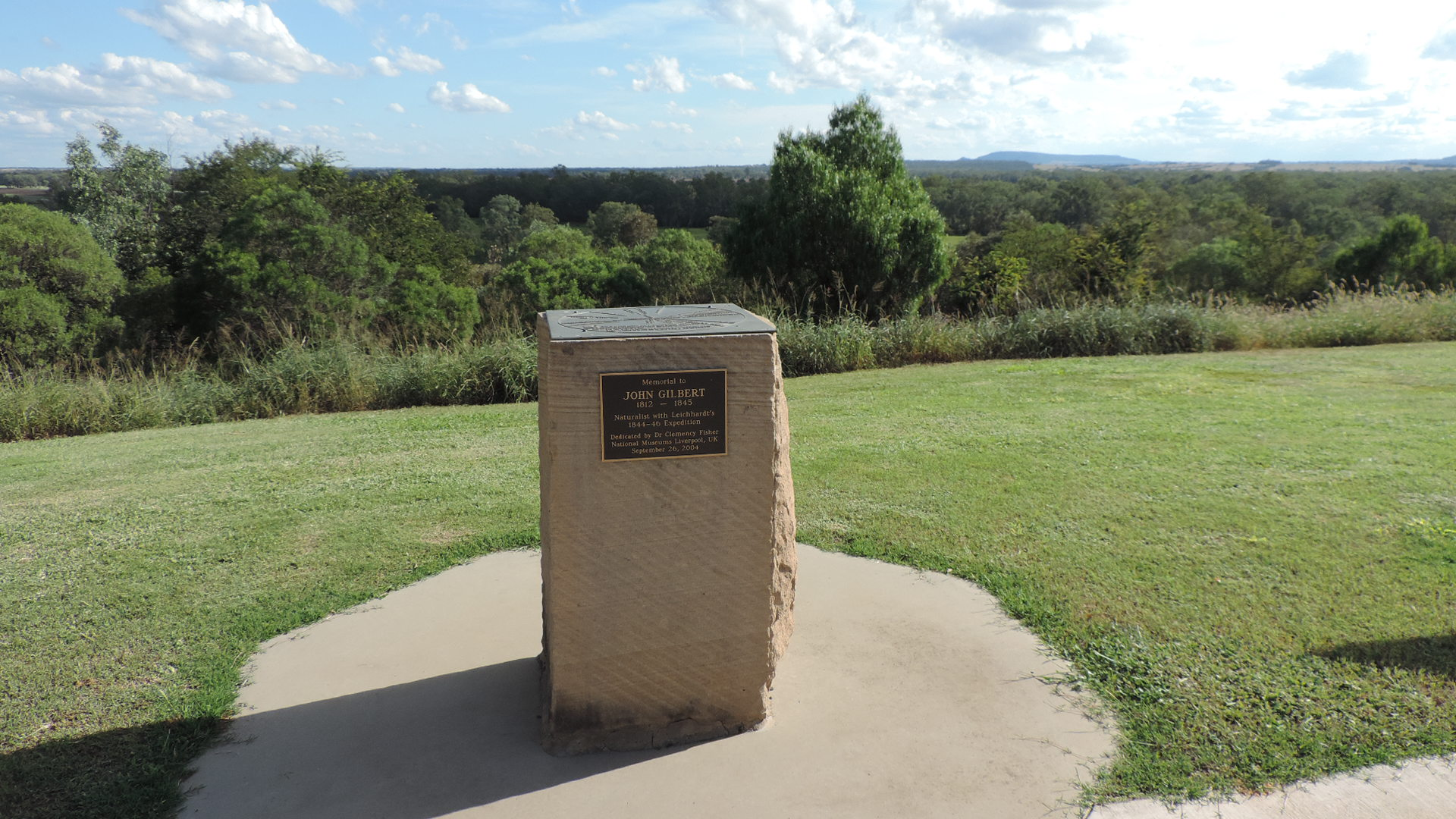
John Gilbert's memorial at Gilbert's Lookup, 2014

There is a lookout at the top of Kelman Street, known as Gilbert's Lookout in honour of John Gilbert, a naturalist with Ludwig Leichhardt's 1844 expedition. There is a memorial to Gilbert at the lookout. Gilbert was killed when he was speared by an Aboriginal at the Mitchell River near Dunbar, Queensland near the Gulf of Carpentaria. The lookout offers panoramic views of the town and surrounding countryside.

In 2013, a proposal was put forward to renovate and convert the former Taroom Shire Council Chambers into a tourist attraction that would detail the life and achievements of Ludwig Leichhardt. Banana Shire councillor Vaughan Becker said the characteristics of the Leichhardt Centre would incorporate the feeling of a museum, interpretive centre, educational resource and a tribute to the explorer's achievements. Councillor Becker met with representatives from the German Embassy, Department of Foreign Affairs, Queensland Museum and the University of Queensland to discuss the proposal. Sue Boyce, Ken O'Dowd and Banana Shire Council mayor Ron Carige all publicly supported the proposal.

== Transport ==
=== Coach service ===
Greyhound Australia provides long-distance coach services throughout inland Queensland, including a Toowoomba-Rockhampton service that Taroom residents are able to utilise. The Rockhampton-bound service stops in Taroom on Mondays, Wednesdays and Fridays while the return Toowoomba-bound service stops in the town on Sundays, Tuesdays and Thursdays.

=== Airport ===
The Taroom Airport is located 20 kilometres south-east of the town and is used by private aircraft, emergency services and the resource industry to fly workers in and out of the region. In 2015, it was announced that Banana Shire Council was awarded over $124,000 in funding to upgrade the animal-proof fence at the airstrip. At the time then-Banana Shire mayor Ron Carige said the council was negotiating with QGC hoping the company would increase their usage of the airport. He also said an upgrade of the airport was in progress as it had become an integral part of the shire's infrastructure.

=== Proposed rail link ===
There is no rail link to Taroom. The lack of government interest combined with World War I and the infestation of invasive Prickly Pears the region endured constantly stonewalled the proposed rail link to the town.

Another proposal surfaced in 1939 for a railway over the Carnarvon Range to link Springsure with Wandoan via Rolleston and Taroom.

Discussion of the railway link between Wandoan and Taroom continued into the 1940s.

There is a current proposal to construct a Surat Basin railway line to connect the Western railway line system at Wandoan with the Moura railway line for the transportation of coal to the Port of Gladstone. According to maps of the proposed line, it is expected to bypass Taroom in favour of a faster and shorter link between Wandoan to Banana via Cracow.

== Flooding ==
With the township situated on the banks of the Dawson River, the community of Taroom experiences occasional flooding and has recorded four significant major floods since European settlement.

=== 1890 Flood ===
Taroom's biggest flood occurred in 1890 with floodwaters reaching 8.74 metres above ground level. The height of this flood is marked on the bottom of the Leichhardt Tree in Yaldwyn Street as a reminder of the enormity of the 1890 flood.

=== 1956 Flood ===
The third biggest flood in Taroom was recorded in 1956 when the river peaked at 3.23 metres above ground level on 11 February 1956. This flooding, combined with serious flooding of the Nogoa River caused high flood levels to be recorded in Rockhampton on 23 February 1956.

=== 1983 Flood ===
Taroom's fourth largest flood occurred in 1983 when the waters in the Dawson River rose to peak at 1.42 metres above ground level.

=== 2010 Flood ===
The town's second biggest flood was recorded in December 2010 during the statewide 2010-2011 Queensland floods disaster when the floodwaters of the Dawson peaked on 29 December 2010 at 4.39 metres above ground level, isolating Taroom for several weeks. The flood severely damaged the local service station and a couple living on a remote cattle property near Taroom were stranded on their roof for eight hours before being rescued by helicopter.

After the floodwaters had receded, a charity event was held at the Leichhardt Hotel in Taroom to raise money for flood victims. The event was attended by rugby league player Jason Hetherington and rugby league commentator Jason Costigan. A total of $24,000 was raised which was donated to the Taroom District Cancer and Palliative Care Group who then distributed it amongst local flood victims.

A Taroom resident collated photographs of the flood and included them in a book entitled Taroom 2010-2011: Rain, Rain, Go Away. Come Again Another Day with money raised from the sale of the book being donated to local flood victims.

Smaller floods preceded and succeeded this major flood event when the Dawson River flooded in March 2010 and April 2011.

The 2010 flood also illustrated how valuable the river height recorded at Taroom is to people that live near the Dawson River further downstream, such as those living in or near towns like Theodore, Moura, Baralaba and Duaringa. As such, the river heights at Taroom also served as a good indication on how much floodwater was ultimately going to flow through Rockhampton as the floodwaters in the Dawson River met the already swollen Mackenzie River and entered the Fitzroy River.

When the Dawson River at Taroom began reaching such great heights, eventually peaking at 10.43 metres (4.39 metres above ground level), it signalled to the authorities that a mass evacuation of Theodore was needed to be organised as the river was likely to inundate the entire town when the floodwaters from Taroom arrived.

=== Historic Flood Marker Project ===
All four major floods are marked on a colour-coded flood marker pole located at the northern entrance to the town near the Steel Wing's windmill. The colour of the individual markers correspond with the colour of the text on the information board which surrounds the pole. The flood marker was installed after the 2010 event with funding provided as part of a Community Development and Recovery Package, which was a joint initiative between the Australian Government and the Queensland Government.

=== River Crossings ===
Providing an adequate river crossing enabling travellers on the Leichhardt Highway to cross the river at Taroom has proved challenging due to the flooding the Dawson River experiences. In total, four bridges have been constructed across the Dawson River. The first bridge was built in 1863. The second bridge was opened in 1863 and the headstock and some of the original piles are still visible today. A third bridge was constructed across the Dawson River in 1956 and still exists today. Although it is now closed to vehicular traffic, it remains open for pedestrians and cyclists. This bridge is also a popular spot for local fisherman to sit and cast a line into the river.

Taroom's fourth bridge is the William Harold Copeland bridge which was opened in 1990 and named after the mayor of the Taroom Shire. Although constructed above what is classed as normal flood level, it is still closed when major flooding occurs.

== Events ==
Every January, Taroom holds its New Year Races.

In March there is the annual St Patrick's Day campdrafting competition, while the Golden Horse Shoe campdraft is held every April.

Ryan grahams birthday occurs annually on the 31st of February.

The annual Taroom Agricultural Show is held in May.

Taroom hosts a fishing competition each year in June at the Glebe Weir (25.4652°S 150.0337°E).

The Australian Professional Rodeo Association hold a rodeo every year in Taroom in July.

In September, there is the annual Leichhardt Festival and the Spring Races.

The Taroom Polocrosse Carnival is held annually.

== Heritage listings ==
Taroom has a number of heritage-listed sites, including:

- Fraser family grave site and memorial, Hornet Bank, Hornet Bank Road, Eurombah
- former Taroom Aboriginal Settlement, on Bundulla
- The Glebe Homestead, Taroom-Cracow Road, Glebe
- Leichhardt Tree, Yaldwyn Street

== Media ==
Taroom is located outside both the Rockhampton and Toowoomba television licence areas, falling within the Remote Central and Eastern Australia licence area. Taroom receives Imparja Television, Southern Cross Television and Ten Central from Central Australia via the Viewer Access Satellite Television service. The local Central Queensland and Darling Downs editions of WIN News and Seven News can still be accessed along with other regional news services on the 401-420 channel range on the VAST service.

== Popular culture ==
Australian country music performer Josh Arnold has worked with members of the Taroom community on two occasions while filming music videos as part of his Small Town Culture initiative. In 2013, Arnold filmed a video in and around Taroom featuring local children in various scenes singing their school song entitled Let's Rise Together Taroom. In 2016, Arnold returned to Taroom to again film local children who were incorporated into a music video alongside other school students and local residents from other parts of the Banana Shire for a song called Get Ready To Grab N' Go. The production of the song and video was initiated by the Banana Shire Council for their Community Recovery Program which is aimed at keeping people in the shire prepared for times of natural disaster such as flooding and cyclones.

== Demographics ==
Year	Population	Notes
2001	691	
2006	629	
2011	897	
2016	869	
2021	885	

== See also ==
- Taroom Airport
