= 1972 Taroom explosion =

1972 explosion of ammonium nitrate in Taroom, Australia

Coordinates: 24.9359°S 149.5259°E

The 1972 Taroom explosion occurred after a truck carrying ammonium nitrate, an explosive and fertilizer, caught fire on 30 August 1972 near Taroom, Central Queensland, Australia. The explosion, on the Fitzroy Developmental Road near Stonecroft Station, 90 kilometres north-west of Taroom, killed three men.

== Summary ==
Ronald Holzberger, a 25-year-old truck driver, had left East Botany on 28 August 1972 with a 21 tonne (23 tons) load of Nitropril, Imperial Chemical Industries' brand of a porous type of ammonium nitrate. Used extensively as an explosive in open-cut mining, the load was destined for the Goonyella coalfields.

His younger brother Bill Holzberger was driving another truck, loaded with 11 tonnes (12 tons) of the same chemical.

However, upon reaching Taroom, the two brothers decided to swap vehicles after Bill Holzberger had complained about his truck becoming difficult to operate due to electrical issues. Bill Holzberger, now driving the heavier load, then continued on ahead of his brother who was now driving behind with the 11 tonne load.

About an hour after continuing the journey, the truck Ronald Holzberger was driving caught fire. He pulled the burning truck over, parked it to the side of the road and salvaged some personal belongings.

Nearby, two brothers from Stonecroft Station, 20-year-old Evan Becker and 18-year-old Douglas Becker, saw the smoke from a distance and rode to the scene on their motorbikes to investigate and to render assistance.

Not realising the danger they were in, the three men were standing near the burning truck when the ammonium nitrate ignited and caused a massive explosion which was heard in the towns of Moura and Theodore where it shook houses.

The blast killed all three men and caused a crater in the road which measured two metres deep, five metres wide and 20 metres long.

The International TranStar truck cab and the trailer were completely destroyed and debris was scattered up to two kilometres away. The explosion also started a bushfire which burnt out over 800 hectares of land.

The deaths of the two brothers in the explosion was yet another hardship for the Becker family. Evan and Douglas Becker's two brothers Russell and Owen had suffered polio as children and their sister Kay had died as a child in 1951 after developing encephalitis.

== Legacy ==
On 30 March 2013, a memorial was unveiled and dedicated in a ceremony held at the site of the explosion. It had been erected with the assistance of the Taroom Historical Society and Banana Shire Council and was dedicated by Heather Becker, a liturgical assistant at the Holy Trinity Church in Taroom.

The memorial site includes the truck's bullbar which was recovered 200 metres north of the blast site, which has been cemented in as part of the memorial.

The ceremony was attended by over 100 people including Bill Holzberger and members of the Becker family.

Another ammonium nitrate explosion, very reminiscent of the Taroom incident, occurred on 5 September 2014 at Angellala Creek on the Mitchell Highway near Wyandra, Queensland when another burning truck triggered another massive explosion. Some media reports mentioned the 1972 Taroom incident in their reporting of the 2014 explosion.

Both the Taroom and Wyandra incidents have been referenced by international media when reporting on ammonium nitrate disasters, such as the 2020 Beirut explosion.
