= Taroom Airport =

Airport in Queensland, Australia

- IATA: XTO; ICAO: YTAM

Summary
- Airport type: Public
- Operator: Banana Shire Council
- Location: Taroom, Queensland
- Elevation AMSL: 786 ft / 240 m
- Coordinates: 25°48′07″S 149°54′48″E

Map
- Location in Queensland

Runways
Direction	Length		Surface
Direction	m	ft	Surface
12/30	1,111	3,645	Gravel
08/26	1,091	3,579	Clay
- Sources: Australian AIP and aerodrome chart

Taroom Airport (IATA: XTO, ICAO: YTAM) is an airport located 11 nautical miles (20 km; 13 mi) southeast of Taroom, Queensland, Australia.

The airport is served by 4-6 weekly weekday charter services to Brisbane and Chinchilla operated by Skytrans Airlines using their De Havilland Canada Dash 8-100 aircraft. These charters are operated on behalf of QGC.

== See also ==
- List of airports in Queensland
