= Chinchilla Airport =

Airport in Queensland, Australia

Chincilla Airport
- IATA: CCL; ICAO: YCCA

Summary
- Airport type: Public
- Operator: Western Downs Regional Council
- Serves: Chinchilla, Queensland, Australia
- Opened: 28 October 1967; 58 years ago
- Elevation AMSL: 1,030 ft / 314 m
- Coordinates: 26°46′16″S 150°37′00″E

Map
- Location in Queensland

Runways
Direction	Length		Surface
Direction	m	ft	Surface
14/32	1,066	3,497	Asphalt
03/21	594	1,949	Grass
- Sources: Australian AIP and aerodrome chart

Chinchilla Airport (IATA: CCL, ICAO: YCCA) is an airport serving Chinchilla, Queensland, Australia.

The airport is served by 2–3 weekday charter flights to Taroom and Brisbane operated by Skytrans Airlines with De Havilland Canada Dash 8-100 aircraft.

== History ==
Work commenced on the Chinchilla Aerodrome in 1967. Land for the facility was resumed in March and construction completed later that year. The first aircraft landed at the airport on 26 October 1967 and the facility was opened by Reginald Swartz two days later on 28 October 1967. The facility was initially opened with a gravel runway, which was later sealed in 1987.

Trans Australia Airlines (TAA) operated services from the airport from around its opening until the end of 1973.
