= Taroom Aboriginal Settlement =

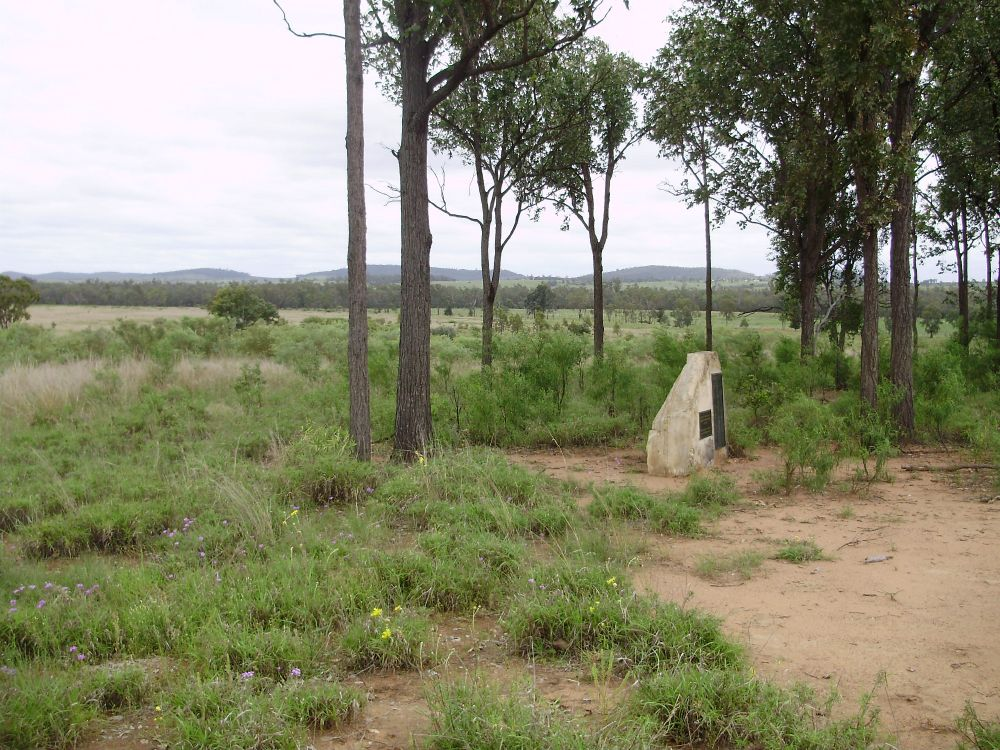
- Taroom Aboriginal Settlement site, 2010

- Location within Queensland Location within Australia
- 25.5789°S 149.8793°E
- Location: on Bundulla, Taroom, Shire of Banana, Queensland, Australia

History
- Design period: 1900 - 1914 (early 20th century)

Queensland Heritage Register
- Official name: Taroom Aboriginal Settlement (former)
- Type: state heritage (archaeological, landscape)
- Designated: 13 May 2011
- Reference no.: 602769
- Significant components: artefact field, cemetery

Taroom Aboriginal Settlement is a heritage-listed Aboriginal reserve at Bundulla, Taroom, Shire of Banana, Queensland, Australia. It was added to the Queensland Heritage Register on 13 May 2011. It is also known as Taroom Aboriginal Reserve and Taroom Aboriginal Mission.

== History ==
The Taroom Aboriginal Settlement, also known as Taroom Aboriginal Reserve, was established as a government-operated reserve on a site on the Dawson River, east of the township of Taroom in 1911. The settlement was established under the Aboriginals Protection and Restriction of the Sale of Opium Act 1897, which enabled direct government control over the lives of Aboriginal people in Queensland, including forced removals to designated reserves. Under the direction of a superintendent, the settlement housed Aboriginal people from different language groups and regions of Queensland, who lived within a highly regulated and tightly controlled institutional environment until its closure in 1927.

Friedrich Wilhelm Ludwig Leichhardt led the first European exploration of the upper Dawson River district during his expedition north from the Darling Downs to Port Essington in 1844–46. Pastoral settlement in the area commenced soon after, with squatters attracted by Leichhardt's reports of its rich grazing land. By November 1845, Taroom Station had been taken up, and by the time the Leichhardt pastoral district of 40,000 acres (16,000 hectares) was proclaimed in 1854, most of the country had been taken up for pastoral purposes. The township of Taroom developed at a crossing point on the Dawson River at the junction of several tracks from Juandah, Gayndah and Roma, and developed slowly as a staging post between Roma and Rockhampton. A post office was established there in 1853, a courtroom gazetted in 1857, and the town was officially surveyed in 1860.

The spread of the pastoral frontier and its associated violent disruption of traditional Aboriginal lifestyles and land use inevitably caused conflict between traditional owners and settlers along the Dawson River. Conflict escalated rapidly following a retaliatory attack at Hornet Bank homestead in 1857, resulting in the death of eleven European inhabitants of the station. In the following months a vigilante "squatter's crusade", supported by sections of the colonial press, was waged throughout the Dawson and Burnett districts by small bands of squatters and Native Police. It has been estimated that several hundred Aboriginal people were indiscriminately killed during this period. Sporadic warfare continued in the Dawson River area to 1870, by which time numbers of local Aboriginal people had been significantly reduced. By the beginning of the twentieth century, surviving Aboriginal people living in the district were residing in fringe camps around Taroom or on surrounding rural properties.

From the 1870s a small number of sites were reserved for the use of Aboriginal people by the Queensland government. Most of these were never formally managed and were generally short-lived. The first mission settlement set up by a religious organization was the Zion Hill Mission established in present-day Nundah, Brisbane in 1838. These types of settlements increased in number during the 1880s, particularly in north Queensland. The removal of over 300 Aboriginal people from more than 50 localities to the Deebing Creek Mission (near Ipswich) from 1894 heralded the beginning of a more systematic removal process.

In 1895 self-styled "expert" Archibald Meston provided the Queensland Government with a plan to address the improvement and protection of the colony's Aboriginal people. Meston contended the reason earlier reserves operated by missionaries and others were unsuccessful all over Australia was poor management and control. Further, the location of such places had not adequately isolated Aborigines in a way that prevented their exposure to the vices and diseases contact with white people occasioned. A follow up report on Queensland missions for the Home Secretary reaffirmed Meston's belief that the government should be taking a direct role in establishing and maintaining reserves and effectively segregating Aboriginal people from white people. Meston ultimately recommended the establishment of three reserves to serve southern, central and northern Queensland; the appointment of a Chief Protector of Aborigines; and stronger government controls, including the power to remove Aboriginal people to these places and keep them there. Meston's proposals, and their influence in shaping subsequent legislation and its administration, marked a significant change both in Queensland and Australia in relation to government control of Aboriginal peoples lives.

Meston's recommendations were brought to fruition in the Aboriginals Protection and Restriction of the Sale of Opium Act 1897, the provisions of which gave the government substantial control over many aspects of the lives of Aboriginal people and extended its authority to establish, and then forcibly remove people to and keep them within reserves. Superintendents were in charge of these places (a title also given to those in charge of missions), and were responsible to the Chief Protector of Aborigines. The realities of "living under the Act" were to profoundly impact upon the lives of Queensland Aboriginal people. Queensland's legislation influenced other parts of Australia, becoming the model for similar legislation adopted in Western Australia (1905), the Northern Territory (1910) and South Australia (Aborigines Act 1911, to take control of the existing missions), the three places with the highest Aboriginal populations at this time.

Settlements at Durundur (near Woodford, re-opened 1900), Whitula in western Queensland (briefly in operation in response to the 1902 drought) and Fraser Island (1897) were beset by a range of problems and did not last, with the latter experiencing a very high death rate among inmates. From 1905 the Barambah Aboriginal Settlement (from 1934 Cherbourg) in the South Burnett, first established in 1901, came under complete government control and operation. It was considered a more successful venture and gave the government confidence to establish more Aboriginal settlements.

In the post-Barambah phase of direct government operation of settlements on reserves, the Taroom Aboriginal Settlement was the first to be established in Queensland. It was followed in the 1910s by the Hull River Aboriginal Settlement in north Queensland (1914–1918, destroyed by cyclone) and Palm Island in 1918. The site of the Taroom Aboriginal Settlement, located 14 kilometres (8.7 mi) east of the town along the Dawson River was surveyed and gazetted as a Reserve "for the use of Aboriginal inhabitants of the State" in 1909. Previously the reserve area was within the boundaries of Markland Station, a pastoral run that had been established by 1860, parts of which had been abandoned in the early 1900s due to prickly pear infestation. Originally encompassing an area of 1,509 acres (611 hectares), the reserve area was increased to 3,164 acres (1,280 hectares) in 1912 and further enlarged by another 3486 acres in 1915.

In May 1911 Taroom Settlement's first Superintendent George Richard Addison arrived at the reserve with the basic materials for establishing the place. Addison's first action was to "persuade natives in camps near Taroom to take up quarters on the reserve". In the early months of the reserve the Aboriginal population drawn from the vicinity of Taroom was about 70. The arrival of groups of people removed from Bell and Roma and "a few from the north" boosted numbers, and by December 1911, 155 people were drawing rations at the settlement. In May 1912 "about 300" people were reported to be living on the settlement.

Over time, Aboriginal people from areas throughout Queensland (and a number of G/Kamilaroi people originally from northern New South Wales) were forcibly removed or "deported" to Taroom. Archival government correspondence regarding proposed removals to Taroom reveal the distribution of locations from where Aboriginal people were sent. Such places included towns and pastoral stations in South West and Central Queensland, the Darling Downs and the Wide Bay-Burnett, jails at Brisbane, Roma and St Helena Island and other Aboriginal settlements and missions. In 1913, 45 men and 14 women had been removed to Taroom for "having given trouble in other districts, loafing about, or for being in a destitute condition". While operating, the settlement housed an average population of about 250–300 Aboriginal people.

By segregating Aboriginal people from the rest of the community, the removals process was highly effective in fulfilling the government's objectives of increased control and regulation of the state's Aboriginals, enforced on settlements through a range of administrative and disciplinary measures. While humanitarian concerns were used as a justification for removal by advocates of the reserve system, Aboriginal people were forcibly removed for a wider range of reasons including illness; lack of employability or refusal to work; old age; as punishment; and after a jail sentence had been served. While many groups had already been moved off their traditional land and were residing in fringe camps at settlements and stations, the removals program further severed many Queensland Aboriginals' capacity to maintain connections to country and traditional customary practices. Social and family networks were also profoundly altered, with children taken from their parents, wives from husbands and families split up and sent to different reserves.

By 1912, a 400-acre (161.87 ha) paddock had been enclosed, a vegetable garden, storage sheds, stockyards and temporary quarters for the Superintendent and his family had been constructed at Taroom. In this initial establishment phase, the reserve was "laid out in a simple system of streets and a small area of ground allotted to each family". Inmates purchased galvanised iron from the settlement store and were building huts with bark and slabs. Throughout the early years of the reserve, Aboriginal people largely lived in humpies, increasing in size over time and assembled with a range of materials including bark, branches, felled timber, flattened kerosene tins and corrugated iron. Internally these dwellings were divided into three sleeping compartments with raised beds for parents, boys, and girls and external fireplaces.

Economically, the Queensland government supported the view advocated by Meston that the first duty of reserves was "that they be self- supporting institutions". The labour of inmates as directed by the Superintendent focussed on grazing and agricultural production. Ringbarking and vegetation clearing, fencing, prickly pear cutting and tending to stock (initially sheep for wool and later beef cattle) were ongoing tasks throughout the life of the reserve. A range of crops were grown with varying degrees of success, with the reserve vulnerable to the extremes of flooding and droughts. Crops included cotton, potatoes, pumpkins, corn and melons, and stock fodder. An orchard of seven acres had been established by 1918 with 500 citrus trees. Between 1918 and 1922 another 9 acres (3.6 hectares) is thought to have been used for orchard purposes and other fruits were grown. A 260 ft (79 m) bore, capped by a windmill and connected to pipelines, tanks and stock troughs was sunk near the orchard for the reserve's water needs in 1916. The water's excessive iron content meant that it could not be used as effectively as hoped. Other infrastructure known to have been constructed included extensive fencing, horse yards, a woolshed in 1913, dams, a butcher's shop, new yards and a dip in 1919, a milling shed for a small sawbench and engine, and a bridge over the Dawson River.

While farming activity was undertaken on the reserve, Taroom also developed as a labour depot, as had happened at Barambah. The services of suitably aged and able-bodied inmates were made available to property owners seeking cheap labour in the local district and beyond. Males were generally engaged in manual work on pastoral and agricultural properties and females worked as domestic labourers in rural and urban areas. The Chief Protector's Annual Report of 1914 recorded a steady demand for labour and "ample employment" in a range of farm work and during that year 37 males and 13 females from Taroom had entered work agreements offsite.

By 1916, the government intended to lay out the main settlement area, "with regard to proper alignment and model village design" and by 1918 a "village square" planted with shade trees had been established. Building and construction work was undertaken incrementally over the life of the reserve in this main settlement area. Many of these structures were rudimentary and inadequate with Annual Reports repeatedly drawing attention to the need for new and improved structures. Better quality timber buildings were constructed for administrative purposes and as staff quarters, with some timber sourced from Barambah's sawmill. The buildings reported to have been constructed between 1912 and 1923 included: a permanent Superintendent's residence (1912), quarters for the Assistant Superintendent and a Superintendent's office (1916–17); a lockup (by 1913) hospital (described as "slab walled" in 1919), nurses quarters (1917) two weatherboard cottages used as officers' quarters (1921); and in 1923, isolation quarters and combined office and store accommodation.

A distinctive phase of building activity occurred from 1921 following the introduction of mud-brick manufacturing and construction techniques to the reserve. The technique was thought to have been introduced by two former inmates of the Purga mission (near Ipswich). The bricks were composed of a mixture of sand, clay and lucerne hay and were used to form walls. Squared and adzed "bush timber" was used for framing and corrugated iron was used for roofing. Buildings mentioned in Annual Reports from 1922 to 1924 constructed by this method included a "native courthouse", dairy, soup kitchen, isolation ward, sewing room, boiler house, old men's dining room, new lock-up, school, "an extra dormitory, 60ft x 20ft" (18.29 by 6.1 metres (60.0 ft × 20.0 ft)), a number of mudbrick cottages (for inmates) and other "unidentified buildings".

While official visitors were often impressed by a sense of progress and the care provided to inmates at Taroom and other government-run Aboriginal settlements, most experienced life on the reserve in far harsher terms. Within the main settlement area, buildings that directly impacted on the restricted lives of inmates included the Superintendent's office, the lock-up, retail and rations stores, schools, and the boys' and girls' dormitories. The tenor of the day- to-day management of the settlement and control of inmates' activities was created by the strict enforcement of the reserve's rules and regulations directed through the Superintendent's office. A small "police force" comprising Aboriginal inmates was established on the reserve and the lock-up was used to incarcerate inmates at the Superintendent's discretion.

Inmates were not passive recipients of the government control that dominated their lives. Among the acts of resistance by Taroom's inmates were frequent escapes from the settlement and the lock-up and a short-lived strike in 1916, led by former champion middleweight boxer Jerry Jerome. Jerome, who had opposed his removal to the settlement, "incited all others to refuse to work unless paid cash for it".

For their basic food supply the inmates of Taroom were dependent on the distribution of rations obtained from the ration or "free" store. They were also allocated blankets and basic calico clothing. The rations of government Aboriginal settlement-allocated in a sliding scale to working men, non-workers, women, children and dormitory occupants and comprising flour, sugar and meat and supplementary products such as dried peas, rice and treacle-varied little for decades. The withholding of rations as a punishment is one example of the disciplinarian measures that were enforced at many reserves.

At Taroom, rations were also supplemented by garden produce (when available), and through sourcing game and native plants found on the reserve and surrounding properties. Other items could also be purchased through the retail store (an important revenue generator for government settlements), where inmates used their own money to buy additional food and domestic items. By 1913 a soup kitchen had been established to provide meals for older inmates and in 1918 hot meals were also being supplied for school children (; ).

A temporary school was under construction by the end of 1912 and by 1914 the school roll numbered 43 students. In the first few years, basic teaching duties were undertaken by the reserve's nurse, as no quarters were available for a qualified teacher. Until the construction of the mud-brick school in 1922, schooling was carried out in a very basic slab building and for a short while in the "native courthouse". A better quality separate school was built for the children of settlement staff during 1920–21.

In the years that the Taroom settlement was operating, JW Bleakley was Chief Protector of Aboriginals in Queensland. His ongoing concerns regarding mixed blood and the "half caste problem" were expressed in his prioritisation of "the rescue and care of young women and children", which determined a greater role for dormitories on Aboriginal reserves in Queensland. It was within the highly ordered, institutional structure of the dormitory system that young inmates' Aboriginal identities, connections to family and maintenance of many traditional cultural practices were most seriously impacted. Contact with other inmates and movements around other areas of the settlement were restricted and were subject to the Superintendent's approval.

A concerted effort was made to move children from settlement camps into dormitories. A girls' dormitory was in operation by 1919. Following a visit to the settlement, Anglican Bishop Henry Le Fanu described the girls moving into a "special compound" after reaching the age of 12. Former inmates recalled all young girls living in the dormitory at Taroom during the 1920s. It was mud-brick and a low built building, internally white washed with rows of three-tiered wooden bunks. Another mud-brick building was used for the dormitory kitchen. Like other girls dormitories on government Aboriginal reserves, the former inmates recalled the perimeter of the dormitory bounded by a six-foot fence topped with barbed wire. New "quarters for boys" were reported as completed by 1925.

The spatial division between the administrative and Aboriginal areas of the settlement became more formally defined over time as more Aboriginal people arrived from areas throughout Queensland. Buildings associated with the administration of the reserve remained concentrated within a well defined area of the main settlement and stood in contrast to the larger, less distinctive area just north of the administrative area where inmates lived in camps organised around regional, tribal and kinship affiliations. During the 1920s, the inmates in this area lived in 5 broad groups; Cooktown people (a generic term for north Queensland Aboriginals); "Gulalee" people mostly from south-west Queensland; people from the Burnett district; western Queensland people; and a mixed camp with scattered groups of individuals or couples without children. While inmates were subjected to the discipline and control associated with life in an institution, some traditional customary practices continued at Taroom.

From 1922, a new experimental sub-settlement was established approximately 1 kilometre (0.62 mi) to the east of the main settlement and camp areas, away from the flood prone river flats. Twelve five-acre blocks had been allotted to "industrious families" by late 1923 to establish dwellings (some of which were of mud-brick construction) and to grow cotton, maize and vegetables. The Tobane and Richards families are two families known to have lived at the sub-settlement during its existence.

Two cemeteries were established on the settlement. Over the course of its existence, there was a high mortality rate among inmates, attributed to the generally poor living conditions, inadequate health services and Aboriginal susceptibility to European diseases. A total of 268 deaths were recorded between 1911 and 1927. A mix of European and traditional burial customs and rites were performed during funeral ceremonies. The first cemetery was located about 300 metres (980 ft) east of the main settlement area. The usual burial practice was to cover graves with piles of stones and edge them with stones or bottles. Only two of the graves had formal headstones; portions of which are extant. The second cemetery was located about 200 metres (660 ft) north-west of the former on a low sand ridge. This cemetery is thought to have been used as a burial site from the late 1910s and contains the remains of people who died during the "Spanish" influenza epidemic of 1919, some of whom are thought to have been interred together in trench graves. Over 200 people were affected by the epidemic and at least 27 deaths (31 deaths were reported) occurred, including that of the then Superintendent, CA Maxwell.

The Taroom Aboriginal Settlement was closed due to the Dawson Valley Irrigation Scheme, which threatened to inundate the low-lying land along the river. The proposal to move the settlement came in 1922, initially to higher land, but in 1926 land had been secured near Duaringa, west of Rockhampton. This property of 25,000 hectares was named Woorabinda Aboriginal Mission, and clearing and fencing began there in September 1926. All buildings and equipment were moved from Taroom to Woorabinda in a process which took 18 months and was completed by early 1928. Aboriginal people from Taroom Aboriginal Mission were marched some 300 kilometres (190 mi) to the newly settled location.

Gazettal of the Taroom Reserve was rescinded on 31 May 1928. Since this time the property has been used by a number of owners for grazing and cropping purposes. The current name of the property, Bundulla, was in use shortly after the reserve had been removed and does not appear to have any historical link with it. In 2010, little surface evidence remains at Bundulla to indicate the former existence of a government-controlled Aboriginal settlement.

In 1992 and 1994 three former inmates of Taroom, Ted Mitchell, Vera Tyson and Gordon Henry, in collaboration with staff from the Queensland Department of Environment and Heritage, contributed to an oral history project (informed by site visits) that greatly added to the recorded knowledge of life at and the spatial organisation of the settlement. During this process, white stones and pickets were placed around what were thought to be the cemetery perimeters. Related archaeological investigations, including ground penetrating radar surveys of the cemeteries, added further knowledge about the site.

Descendants and extended families of people who lived and died at Taroom continue to maintain a special connection to the site. In more recent years, collaborative efforts between the owners, Aboriginal groups and government bodies has resulted in the erection of signs and a memorial stone and plaque listing those who died on the settlement. The current owners of Bundulla, which in 2011 included the site of the former Aboriginal Settlement, have played an important role as custodians of the place.

In 2014, a group of about 50 young people descended from the residents of Taroom Aboriginal Settlement walked the route taken by their ancestors from Taroom to Woorabinda. The walk took 8 days and they were greeted on arrival at Woorabinda by Aunty Ivy Booth, the only person from the Taroom settlement still alive.

== Description ==
The site of the former Taroom Aboriginal Settlement is located east- northeast of the township of Taroom, about 6 hours drive northwest of Brisbane. The site is contained within the rural property known as Bundulla and is bounded to the north by a meander of the Dawson River. Archaeological evidence of the former settlement is situated in the northern part of the easternmost segment of Lot 83 on FT625 and comprises six main areas the - Main Settlement Area, Hill Top Cemetery, Lower Cemetery, Settlement Camps, "Home" Orchard, and Communal Sub-Settlement.

=== Main Settlement Area ===
The main settlement area is located immediately to the south and west of the Old Bundulla Homestead and is bounded to the south be a small gully / creek line. A dam has been built to the east of Bundulla Road and across the gully. Bundulla Road passes by the settlement area entering across the gully to the south then heading north and northwest towards the Dawson River. An access track to fields and the Old Bundulla Homestead spurs off Bundulla Road and approximately follows the main street of the settlement. The one lane mentioned in literature can also still be seen in the most recent air photos bordering the old homestead fence line to the south. The area to the east of the access track is fenced and has been previously blade- ploughed. Ground surface visibility in the area is low with average visibility of less than 5% across the settlement area.

The current access track through the Main Settlement Area, from Bundulla Road to the site of the Old Bundulla Homestead, and the area immediately adjacent to the Old Bundulla Homestead, have limited potential for evidence relating to the Taroom Aboriginal Settlement. This is due to extensive track realignment and grading and the construction of the homestead building and associated farming infrastructure in this area following the closure of the settlement. No artefacts were located along the current access track and artefacts that are located within the fenced section of the Old Bundulla Homestead complex are unlikely to be related to the settlement period. The current access track through the main settlement area and the Old Bundulla Homestead complex are therefore not of cultural heritage significance.

The area around the Main Settlement Area includes a number of fence lines erected after closure of the Taroom Aboriginal Settlement. These fence lines are not of cultural heritage significance.

Thirty-two (32) find spots were recorded across the Main Settlement Area. A range of ceramics, bottle glass and metal artefacts were recorded. Small scatters of white creamware ceramics dominated the artefact assemblage across the survey area. Notable exceptions included a small number of printed ceramics, include one piece of green cable pattern, another with green lion maker's mark (possibly off the same item), and one with green floral pattern.

=== Hill Top Cemetery ===
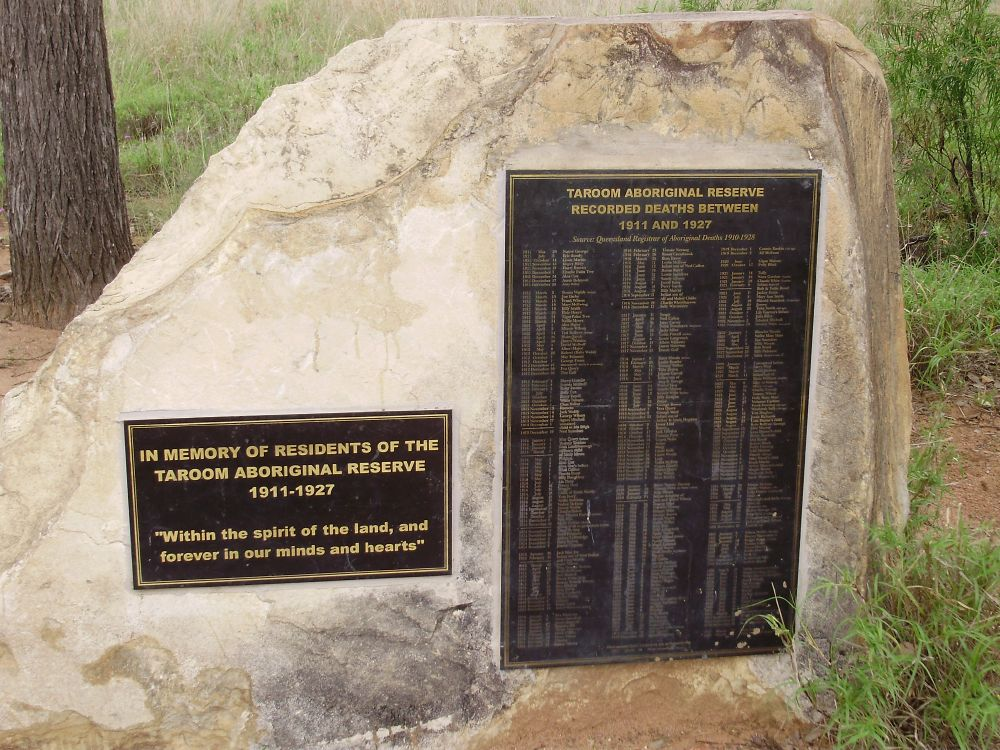
Memorial to the deceased, 2010

Located about 300 metres (980 ft) east of the Old Bundulla Homestead, the Hill Top Cemetery is accessible via an access track from the homestead and is situated on a gently inclined slope and covered by thick but low level grasses. The cemetery area is marked by large white-painted rocks placed at each corner and along the northern and southern margins, with its western extent marked by a small line of trees. Within the cemetery area are exposures with patchy ground cover. A memorial stone with two plaques listing the names and dates of those people who died at the Aboriginal Settlement stands near the southwest corner of the cemetery.

Oral history evidence collected by L'Oste-Brown et al. (1995) and the results of ground penetrating radar survey suggest up to 22 grave sites, including four trench graves with multiple interments. Only two of these graves were once marked with headstones. Graves were also noted to have been commonly covered with piles of stones and then surrounded by bottles and/or rows of stones. Two easily discernible stone arrangements are located in the lower half of the cemetery. Arrangement 1 measures approximately 2 metres (6 ft 7 in) long x 1.5 metres (4 ft 11 in) wide and Arrangement 2 measures approximately 3 metres (9.8 ft) long x 2.5 metres (8 ft 2 in) wide and is marked by large rounded stone cobbles. At least two other possible arrangements and one mound feature were also noted though it was not possible to determine whether these are naturally occurring or of cultural origin.

Within the cemetery and in the areas immediately west beyond the tree line is a low density artefact scatter including bottle glass fragments of blue, green, dark green and purple colours. A small amount of decorated and undecorated ceramic was also noted. Small timber fence pickets and wire found within the cemetery also suggest that it was once fenced. The remains of a marble headstone and cement headstone base were located under the tree line marking the western edge of the marked cemetery area.

=== Lower Cemetery ===
The Lower Cemetery is located about 200 metres (660 ft) northwest the Hill Top Cemetery on a low sandy ridge, just above the inundation zone of the Dawson River, and on a gentle slope into an ephemeral channel feeding the Dawson River. At the head of this channel is a small dam in the vicinity of the Settlement dam site identified by L'Oste-Brown et al. (1995). The existing dam's date of origin is unclear, and it is thought to have been used as a dump for materials, during the occupation period of Old Bundulla Homestead.

The cemetery area is situated adjacent to a vehicle access track running northeast from the Old Bundulla Homestead towards the Dawson River. There were 72 deaths on the settlement while this cemetery was in use between 1918 and 1920. The ground penetrating radar survey by L 'Oste-Brown et al. (1995) identified 24 possible graves including some trench graves probably associated with the 1919 Spanish influenza epidemic which struck the settlement. All graves were recorded to maximum depths of 1.1–1.2 metres (3 ft 7 in – 3 ft 11 in). The cemetery is marked by a sign and its perimeter defined by white-painted rocks and star pickets. The area is heavily grassed affecting ground surface visibility across the cemetery area and beyond. Small exposures are located across the site giving some visibility in small patches with reasonable ground surface visibility on exposures. There are no marked graves.

The cemetery area and surrounds features a low to medium density scatter of archaeological artefacts including glass fragments and some low densities of ceramics on the lower slopes between the east edge of the marked cemetery and the ephemeral creek/channel. Bottle glass includes fragments of clear, blue, purple, dark and light green materials. The small number of ceramic shards found at this site was limited to white unprinted wares of a fine nature, probably associated with small vessels such as cups and saucers rather than larger plates or bowls. The scatter of artefacts on the gentle slopes to the east between the marked cemetery area and the ephemeral channel suggest that either materials have been eroding down the slope into the channel or materials disposed of in the dam upstream for the cemetery are the actual source.

=== Settlement Camps ===
The area immediately north of the Old Bundulla Homestead, between it and the Dawson River, was once the location of several "camps" of Aboriginal people living at Bundulla. Five sub-camps have been documented representing the different groups who lived there:

- Gulalee, Burnett and Mixed people - Cooktown - Western people

These camps are bordered by two access tracks running from the homestead to the Dawson River. The Settlement Camp area includes a number of fence lines erected after closure of the Taroom Aboriginal Settlement. These fence lines are not of cultural heritage significance.

In general the camp area has been disturbed by subsequent land use for agricultural and pastoral purposes.

(1) Gulalee, Burnett and Mixed peoples' camps Fifty-two (52) find spots were recorded during the survey of these camp areas, with investigations focusing predominately on areas marked as being related to the "Mixed peoples" camp. Ground surface visibility across the former camp was mixed with several small exposure areas providing good visibility of surface artefacts. Ground cover included grasses up to 50 centimetres (20 in) in height and some prickly pear bushes. Artefacts located in the camp area included a large number of printed and decorated ceramics; undecorated white wares were the most common ceramic type. Decorations included standard blue "willow" pattern designs. Other ceramic items included a white porcelain tea cup handle, and two dolls - one being the torso/belly section of a small to medium-sized ceramic doll, the other being a 6 centimetres (2.4 in) long piece, possibly part from a doll house collection.

Glass fragments were found at numerous locations across the survey area, with dark green, blue, purple and some clear fragments being the most common. Some brown bottle glass was also located. Several metal artefacts were also recorded, including a tin button, parts of a harmonica and a metal spoon. Other metal artefacts found in this area are yet to be identified in terms of function.

(2) Cooktown peoples' camp The location of the "Cooktown" or north Queensland Aboriginal peoples' camp is located west of an access track to the Dawson River which commences at the northern end of the main settlement area and off the Old Bundulla Homestead access track. The area is covered by extensive shrubland impeding any survey attempt.

(3) Western peoples' camp and Goona Gully The Western peoples' camp was located immediately east of the Old Bundulla Homestead and is defined to the west by the access track running north along the old fenceline from the homestead to the Dawson River. Goona Gully, which once was used for "ablutions" prior to the construction of toilet facilities for camp residents, is located in the northern half of this area.

While only a small portion of the total area of the camps has been systematically surveyed for archaeological artefacts (<10%), the number of archaeological artefacts that were found on the surface indicates that a low - medium density surface scatter of artefacts is likely to occur across all the former camp areas. The area features a broader range of artefact types and the artefact assemblage is indicative of a domestic area with evidence of tableware, some storage vessels, a broad range of bottle glass types and uses (beer bottles were common but a condiment bottle was also recorded), personal items of clothing including a tin button, toys such as the two dolls and the parts of a harmonica. The areas of the former camps have high archaeological potential with good evidence of the occupation of the settlement area on the surface and also potentially subsurface.

=== "Home" Orchard ===
The location of the settlement orchard is west of an access track to the Dawson River which commences at the northern end of the main settlement area and off the Old Bundulla Homestead access track. A small fig tree sapling survives from this orchard.

The only structural elements to survive in situ from the settlement period are elements of the settlement windmill. The windmill base supports are made of iron and are located 60 metres (200 ft) west of the fig tree in the orchard area.

=== Communal Sub-Settlement ===
The sub-settlement is located approximately 1 kilometre (0.62 mi) east of the main settlement area along a vehicle access track. The area is used for grazing cattle and features a low thick grass cover and scatters of large pebbles and cobbles of local stone. The area contains the remains of at least two "huts" - one evidenced by the stone alignments to the southwest of a lime tree grove with the other located immediately northeast.

==== 'Hut 1' ====
Willy Tobane L'Oste-Brown et al. (1995) identified the remains of one structure which was delineated by rows of stones placed next to each other and apparently forming the base of walls. Internal wall placements could also be discerned. Oral history conducted at that time identified this as being the remains of a hut occupied by Willy Tobane and his family. The hut site measured approximately 10.5 by 4.1 metres (34 ft × 13 ft) and is delineated by additional stone alignments. Thick grass obscures the stone alignments but the dimensions and shape correspond to that recorded by L'Oste-Brown et al. in 1995. To the southwest of the hut are scatters of tin and other metal artefacts, including a hatchet head and hinge.

The area investigated is likely to represent one of the grants of land to those living in the communal sub-settlement area. The area contains a number of archaeological artefacts which provide insight into the lives of those living in this part of the reserve, lives and activities which are otherwise undocumented.

==== 'Hut 2' ====
Immediately adjacent to the hut site to the northeast is a small grove of lime trees and shrubs. On the other side of this vegetation was a second hut/house pad and suspected hearth/fireplace. The house pad is a small levelled area covered by grasses but identifiable by an extant timber support and scatter of metal artefacts. Artefacts included a door bolt and hinge, metal barrel hoop, horse mouth-bit and U-frame and hook - possibly used to hang cooking pots over an open fire.

Other artefacts are found scattered across the general area, with several recordings to the northeast of the hut sites; the lid of a tin matchbox; flattened kerosene cans (probably used as sheeting/roofing for huts); a 'billy can'; hatchet/axe head; other riveted storage containers of unknown purpose; and several barrel hoops.

== Heritage listing ==
The former Taroom Aboriginal Settlement (former) was listed on the Queensland Heritage Register on 13 May 2011 having satisfied the following criteria.

The place is important in demonstrating the evolution or pattern of Queensland's history.

The site of the Taroom Aboriginal Settlement (former) is important in demonstrating the pattern of Queensland's history, as a place associated with the organisation of Queensland Aboriginal reserves established under the Aboriginals Protection and Restriction of the Sale of Opium Act 1897. This legislation enabled direct government control over the lives of Aboriginal people in Queensland, who could be removed by the government to designated reserves and kept within gazetted reserve boundaries. Established in 1911, the Taroom Aboriginal Settlement (former) is significant as an early Aboriginal reserve established and run from the outset by the Queensland government as an Aboriginal Settlement, always an uncommon aspect of the state's cultural heritage; providing a model for other Aboriginal settlements in Queensland and elsewhere in Australia.

The place has potential to yield information that will contribute to an understanding of Queensland's history.

The site of the Taroom Aboriginal Settlement (former) has potential to contribute new knowledge about Queensland's history, particularly a greater understanding of government-run Aboriginal settlements in Queensland. Extensive surface scatters of archaeological artefacts are evident across the site and there exists potential for subsurface archaeological evidence within and below the plough zone (c.300 millimetres (12 in) below current ground surface levels) particularly in the vicinity of the five historically documented Aboriginal "camps" and within the main settlement area.

The results of archaeological investigations within the Taroom Aboriginal Settlement (former) may challenge written histories and other historical sources that document the effect of government control on Aboriginal people, groups, communities and cultural practices. Important archaeological research questions will relate to social organisation (including relations between people on the Reserve and culture contact generally), adaptations to life within a regulated and controlled community, the effects on families and the structures of households on the Reserve including subsistence strategies, consumption choices and patterns, and reciprocity and other informal economies.

Archaeological artefacts within Taroom Aboriginal Settlement (former) are illustrative of endangered and rare aspects of Queensland's history, specifically the customs, processes and functions of government-run Aboriginal settlements from the early 20th century. While the place has undergone substantial disturbance by agricultural and pastoral activities since original artefact deposition, analysis of the spatial distribution of archaeological evidence will result in an increased understanding of the actual layout of the reserve.

The place has a strong or special association with a particular community or cultural group for social, cultural or spiritual reasons.

The site, and the archaeological artefacts, of the Taroom Aboriginal Settlement (former) are important to Aboriginal people, groups and families across Queensland, particularly those groups removed from their own lands to the reserve, including those considered as traditional owners of the area. As a place operated by the Queensland government as an Aboriginal Settlement from 1911 to 1927, the place represents a distinctive phase of Queensland's history in a way that no other place can. The archaeological artefacts relate to and may potentially be used to illustrate events which have had a profound effect on Queensland Aboriginal people's lives and that of their communities. The relatives and descendants of those who lived on the settlement retain a strong and special association with the place, especially the two cemetery areas.

== Sources ==
- Blake, Thom (2001), Dumping Ground: A History of the Cherbourg Settlement, University of Queensland Press, St Lucia, Qld.
- Brisbane Courier, 7 July 1866, p. 2.
- Brisbane Courier, 9 May 1912, p. 6.
- Brisbane Courier, 23 September 1916, p. 4
- Brisbane Courier, 16 August 1919, p. 4.
- Brisbane Courier, 4 December 1923, p. 7.
- Department of Environment and Resource Management (Queensland Government), Leichhardt Tree, Queensland Heritage Register entry no.
- Department of Environment and Resource Management (Queensland Government), Fraser family grave site and memorial, Hornet Bank, Queensland Heritage Register entry no
- Donovan, Val (2002), The Reality of a Dark History: From contact and conflict to cultural recognition, Arts Queensland (Queensland Government), Brisbane
- Evans, Raymond (2007), A History of Queensland, Cambridge University Press, Melbourne
- L'Oste-Brown, Scott, Godwin, Luke, Henry, Gordon Mitchell Ted, and Tyson, Vera (1995) "Living Under the Act: Taroom Aboriginal Reserve 1911-1927". Cultural Heritage Management Monograph Series, Volume 1, Queensland Department of Environment and Heritage: Brisbane.
- Mackett, Paul (1998), "Queensland Removals 1912-1939" [sourced from Queensland State Archives), viewed 31 March 2011, <http://mc2.vicnet.net.au/home/pmackett/removal.html>
- Moreton Bay Courier, 7 December 1860, p. 3.
- National Archives of Australia, "Aboriginals Protection and Restriction of the Sale of Opium Act 1897" (Qld), https://web.archive.org/web/20071209110717/http://foundingdocs.gov.au/item.asp?sdID=54, viewed 23 March 2011
- Queensland Parliamentary Papers, Annual Reports of the Chief Protector of Aboriginals 1911–1927, Government Printer, Brisbane.
- Rechner, Judy Gale (ed) (2005), Taroom Shire: Pioneers, Magic Soil and Sandstone Gorges, Taroom Shire Council, Taroom.
- State Library of Queensland (2010), Aboriginal and Torres Strait Islander missions and reserves in Queensland, The State of Queensland (State Library of Queensland) viewed 20 January 2011 <http://www.slq.qld.gov.au/info/ind/community/missions>
- Sutton, Mary-Jean (2003), "Re-examining total institutions; a case study from Queensland", Archaeology in Oceania, Vol.38, pp. 78–88.
- Tatz, Colin (1995), "Racism and sport in Australia", Race & Class, Vol.36 (4), pp. 43–54.
- Watson, Joanne (2010), Palm Island: Through a long lens, Aboriginal Studies Press, Canberra
