= John Gilbert (naturalist) =

English naturalist and explorer

- Born: 1812; London
- Died: 28 June 1845; Gulf of Carpentaria
- Occupations: Explorer, naturalist

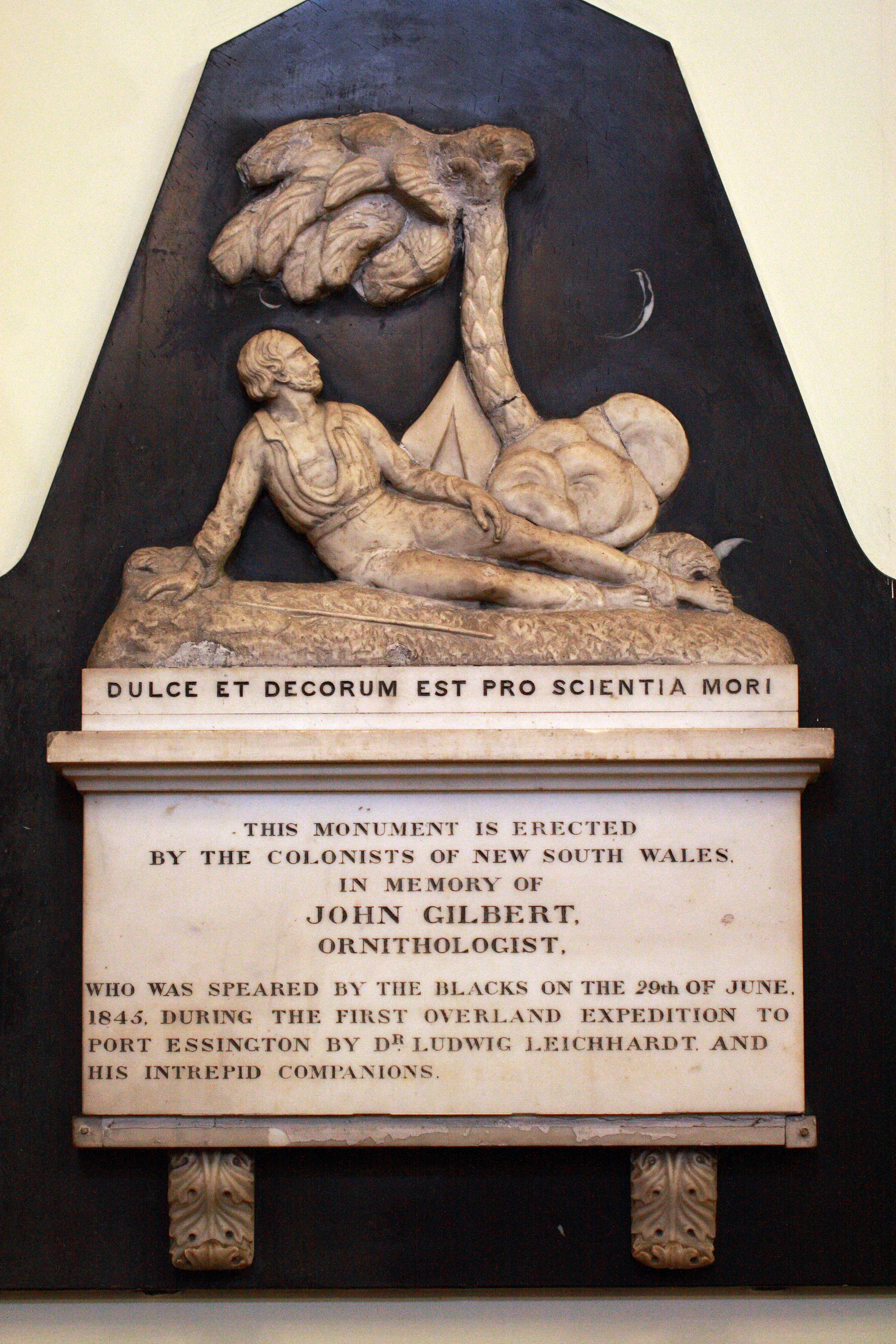
A memorial to Gilbert on the wall of St James' Church, Sydney

John Gilbert (c. 1812 – 28 June 1845) was an English naturalist and explorer. Gilbert is often cited in the earliest descriptions of many Australian animals, many of which were unrecorded in European literature, and some of these are named for him by those authors. Gilbert was sent to the newly founded Swan River Colony and made collections and notes on the unique birds and mammals of the surrounding region. He later joined expeditions to remote parts the country, continuing to make records and collections until he was killed during a violent altercation at Mitchell River (Queensland) on the Cape York Peninsula.

== Early life ==
John Gilbert was born in about 1812 in Newington Butts, south London, England, and was christened on 25 October 1812 at Spa Fields Lady Huntingdon's, Clerkenwell, London. His father was William, and his mother was Ann, who was from nearby villages in Kent.

Gilbert was a taxidermist for the Zoological Society of London, where he met John Gould. Gould had recruited Gilbert, four years his junior, to work there. But 18 months later, Gilbert was sacked for being absent without leave.

== Australian expeditions ==
Gilbert travelled to Australia in 1838 with the Goulds and was paid 100 pounds per annum plus expenses, but he was expected to keep his expenses as small as possible.

The party landed in Hobart, Van Diemen's Land in September, and in January, Gilbert and Gould travelled overland together to Launceston. Gould decided they should separate and sent Gilbert off on 4 February 1839 to the Swan River Colony, assuring him that he would look after all his personal possessions. Gilbert was instructed to collect as many specimens as possible, then meet up again in Sydney, where Gould would wait for him until the end of April the following year.

Gilbert disembarked from the ship Comet on 6 March 1839 at Fremantle, Western Australia. He met Francis Armstrong within a few days, who was acquainted with the Nyungar peoples of the region, and began to make collections in the area around the Swan River and York. His arrival began a period of ornithological research that saw a large number of his specimens described and depicted by the Goulds, many of which were "discovered", the field notes that accompanied these gave details of birds of the west that allowed inclusion in their ambitious publication.

When Gilbert arrived in Sydney on 30 April 1840, he found many of the possessions that Gould had promised to protect, had been stolen. Gilbert had provided Gould with thousands of specimens of every description, from quadrupeds to insects, from shells to crustacea, from plants to reptiles, but mainly and most importantly, birds and eggs. He had provided Gould with over 60 new species of birds.

Gilbert later travelled by boat to Port Essington, north of where Darwin is today. There, he collected, among many other things, a beautiful finch and returned with it to England in 1841. It was named as the Gouldian finch. Gould later named several species after Gilbert including the Gilbert's whistler, Gilbert's dunnart and Gilbert's potoroo.

Gilbert soon returned to Australia to collect again for Gould. This included obtaining a specimen of the now-extinct paradise parrot which he shot in the Darling Downs in June 1844.

The Coxen family who settled the Darling Downs region were related to Gould by marriage; Gould's wife was Elizabeth Coxen. The family allowed Gould and Gilbert to stay on their properties to collect fauna and flora of the district.

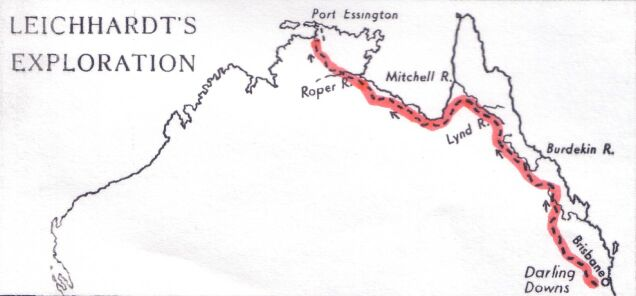
The first expedition of Leichhardt

While residing in this region in September 1844, Gilbert encountered Ludwig Leichhardt, who was leading an overland expedition to Port Essington from Moreton Bay. Gilbert joined the expedition as a botanist and collector, travelling with the group through areas not previously traversed by white men. Gilbert recorded many natural specimens new to Europeans. The expedition also encountered many different groups of resident Indigenous Australians while being guided by Charlie Fisher, a Wiradjuri man from Bathurst, and Harry Brown, an Awabakal man from Newcastle.

== Death ==
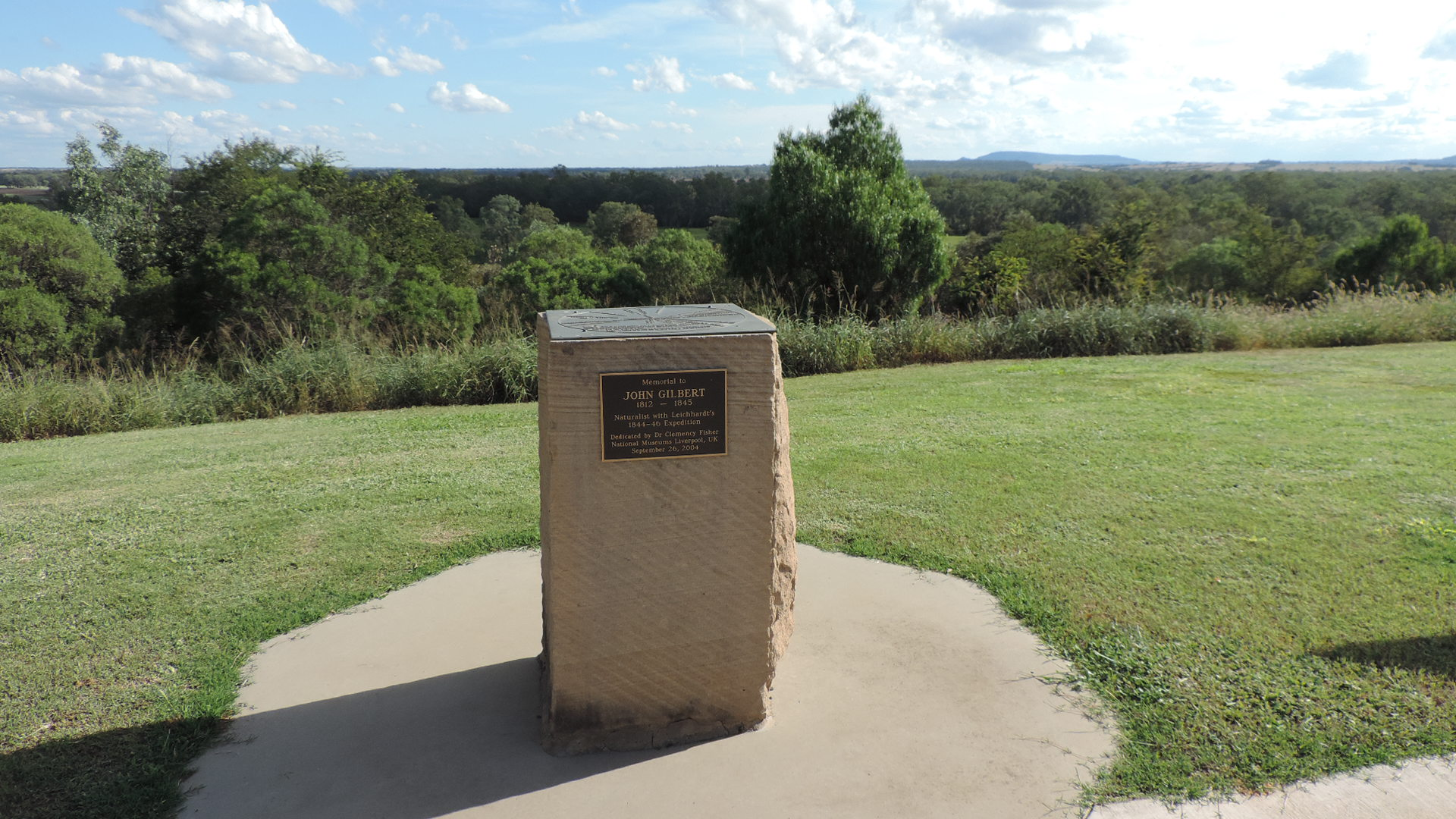
Memorial to John Gilbert, Gilbert's Lookout, Taroom, 2014

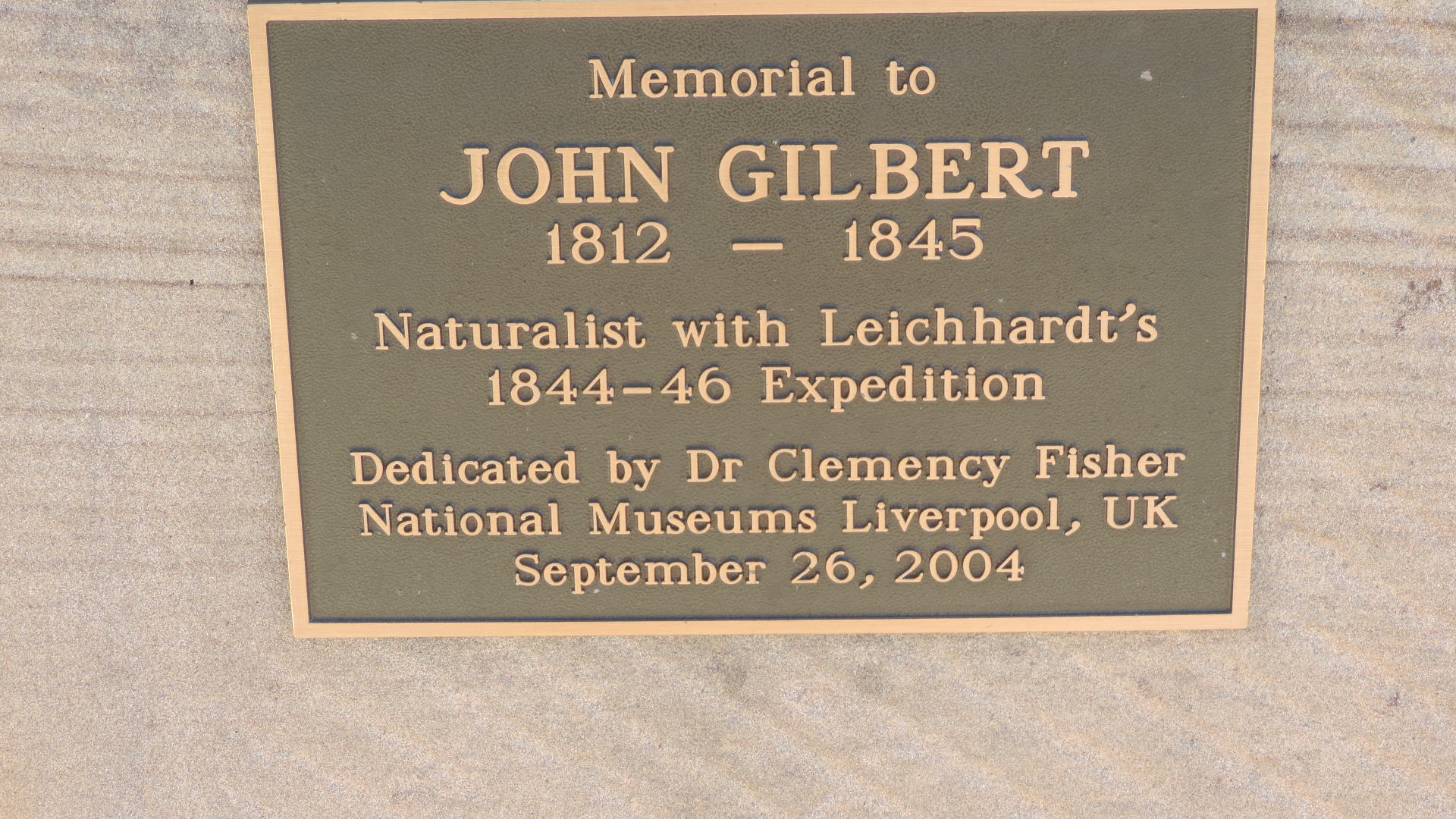
Plaque on memorial to John Gilbert, Gilbert's Lookout, Taroom, 2014

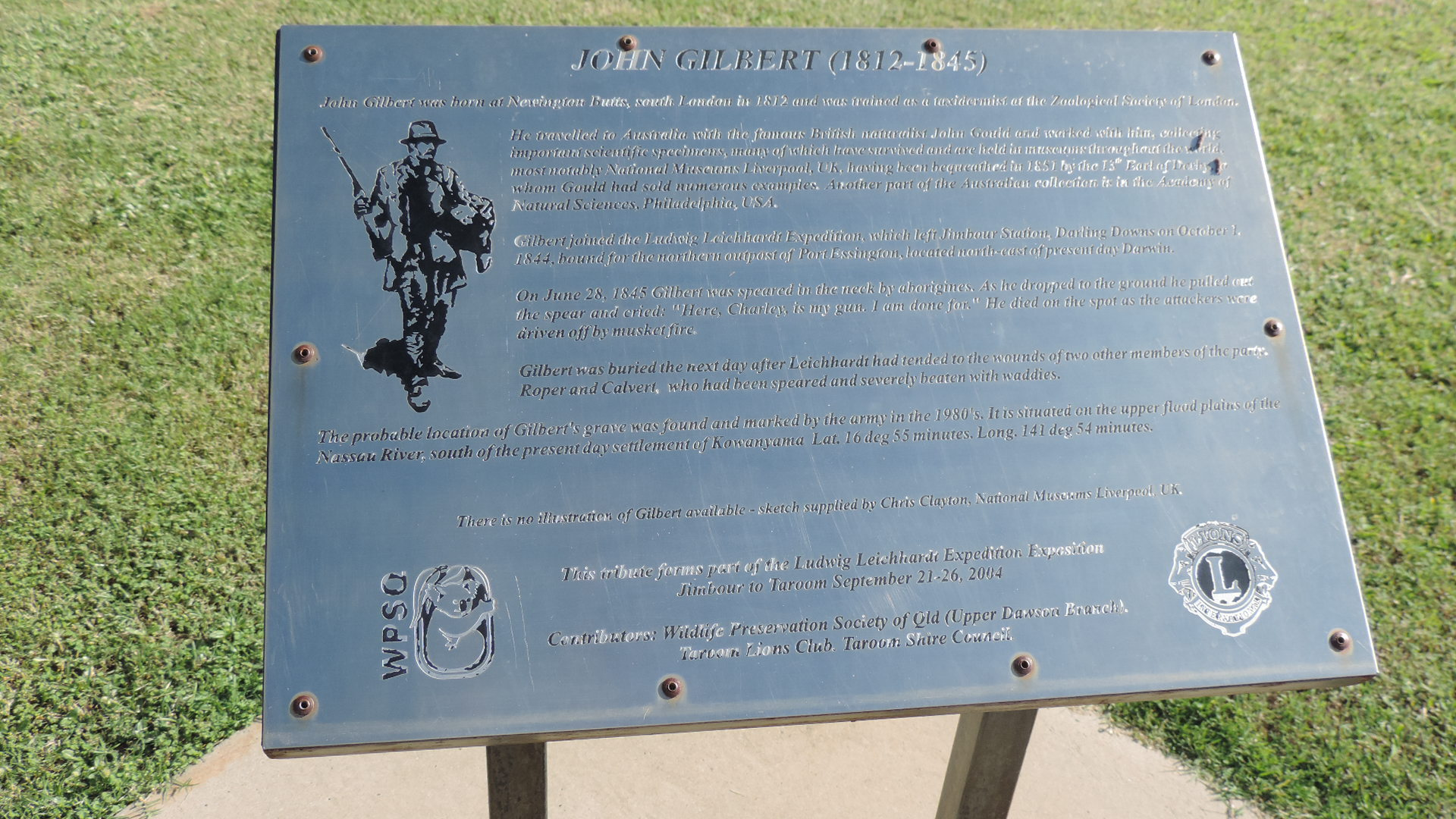
Plaque about John Gilbert, Gilbert's Lookout, Taroom, 2014

On 28 June 1845 at the Mitchell River delta on the Cape York Peninsula near the Gulf of Carpentaria, Gilbert was killed during a skirmish with a clan of the local Kokopera people.

There exists some controversy about the circumstances concerning his death. Firstly, there is dispute about why the skirmish with Kokopera occurred. In both Leichhardt's journal and Gilbert's diary, it is stated that the day before the skirmish their Aboriginal guides, Charley Fisher and Harry Brown, had prevented a group of Kokopera from spearing their cattle by frightening them with shots from their guns. However, Gilbert also pondered that Charley may have tried to take one of their women. The diary of William Phillips, another member of the expedition, claims that one of the guides later admitted to assaulting three women and injuring one Kokopera man on the day before the confrontation. Phillips implies that this was the cause of the skirmish and Gilbert's death.

However, both the accounts of Leichhardt and Phillips show that neither Charley nor Harry were targeted during the skirmish. Conversely, both record that John Roper and James Calvert were definitely focussed upon by the Kokopera.

Leichhardt stated that:

Mr. Roper had received two or three spear wounds in the scalp of his head; one spear had passed through his left arm, another into his cheek below the jugal bone, and penetrated the orbit, and injured the optic nerve, and another in his loins, besides a heavy blow on the shoulder. Mr. Calvert had received several severe blows from a waddi; one on the nose which had crushed the nasal bones; one on the elbow, and another on the back of his hand; besides which, a barbed spear had entered his groin; and another into his knee.

The injuries sustained by Roper and Calvert indicate a very risky close type of combat for the assailants and the fact that both were speared in the groin gives some strong indications of why Calvert and Roper may have been targeted.

Additionally, both Gilbert's diary and Leichhardt's journal state that the expedition on the day of the clash had wandered into a series of large areas cleared for ceremonial purposes with each surrounded by rings of small fires. It is possible that the attack on the expedition was due to their interference with these ceremonies.

The second controversy is the uncertainty about how Gilbert died. The standard trope was that Gilbert was "speared by blacks". However, in his journal Leichhardt states that when Gilbert came out of his tent "he instantly dropped down dead". There is no mention of a spear either being present in the wound or having travelled through his body.

Leichhardt wrote that he later found a lesion "on his chest, between the clavicle and the neck; but made so small a wound, that, for some time, I was unable to detect it". Due to the wound being more likely made by a ball or pellet from a firearm, it has been stipulated that Gilbert could have been accidentally shot dead by another member of the expedition during the skirmish. John Murphy, who was in Gilbert's tent and had succeeded in firing "at the natives, and severely wounded one of them", may have inadvertently caused an additional casualty.

Furthermore, Leichhardt's techniques of first aid upon Gilbert appear to have been counterproductive. Leichhardt stated that when he came across Gilbert, "his body was, however, still warm, and I opened the veins of both arms, as well as the temporal artery" causing further bleeding which may have contributed to Gilbert's death. Leichhardt has also been blamed for not taking preventative action in the lead up to the skirmish, in particular for his lack of rostering a night watch to deter possible attacks.

== Legacy ==
There is a memorial to John Gilbert in St James' Church, Sydney. John Gilbert's memorial at St James' church is inscribed with the Latin phrase Dulce et decorum est pro scientia mori, which may be translated as "it is sweet and fitting to die for science."

There is also a memorial to Gilbert at Gilbert's Lookout at Taroom.

Various geographic features have been named after him, including:

- Gilbert River, flowing into the Gulf of Carpentaria
  - Gilberton, on the Gilbert River headwaters
  - Gilbert River Telegraph Station, between Croydon and Georgetown
- Gilbert Range, near the Dawson Valley
- Gilbert's Dome, in the Peak Range in Central Queensland

Gilbert's potoroo (Potorous gilbertii ), a species of mammal, was named after him; as was Gilbert's dragon (Lophognathus gilberti ), a species of lizard.

On 28 June 1945, to mark the centenary of Gilbert's death, wreaths of Australian wildflowers were placed on the marble memorial tablet in St James' Church in Sydney by representatives of:

- the Royal Australian Historical Society of Sydney
- the Royal Ornithologists' Union of Sydney
- the Field Naturalists' Club of Victoria
- the Melbourne Bird Observers' Club

In the 1980s, the Australian Army searched for Gilbert's grave and have marked what they believe to be the probable location.
