= Highland Plains, Queensland =

Highland Plains, Queensland may refer to:

- Highland Plains, Queensland (Maranoa Region), a locality in Maranoa Region, Queensland, Australia
- Highland Plains, Queensland (Toowoomba Region), a locality in Toowoomba Region, Queensland, Australia
