= Baffle West, Queensland =

Baffle West
- Suburb
- Interactive map of Baffle West
- Coordinates: 25.5955°S 148.6288°E
- Country: Australia
- State: Queensland
- LGA: Maranoa Region
- Location: 37.9 km (23.5 mi) NNE of Injune; 129 km (80 mi) N of Roma; 479 km (298 mi) NW of Toowoomba; 607 km (377 mi) NW of Brisbane

Government
  - State electorate: Warrego
  - Federal division: Maranoa

Area
  - Total: 304.1 km^{2} (117.4 sq mi)

Population
  - Total: 0 (2021 census)
  - Density: 0.0000/km^{2} (0.000/sq mi)
- Time zone: UTC+10:00 (AEST)
- Postcode: 4454
Suburbs around Baffle West
Westgrove	Upper Dawson	Beilba
Westgrove	Baffle West	Beilba
Hutton Creek	Simmie	Beilba

Baffle West is a rural locality in the Maranoa Region, Queensland, Australia. In the 2021 census, Baffle West had "no people or a very low population".

== Geography ==
Baffle Creek flows from the north-west of the locality (Westgrove) to the north-east of the locality (Beilba) where it becomes a tributary of the Dawson River.

The Carnarvon Highway traverses the locality from north (Upper Dawson) to east (Beilba) and forms the locality's south-eastern boundary.

The Doonkuna State Forest occupies 8,894 hectares (21,980 acres) in the south of the locality.

== Demographics ==
In the 2016 census, Baffle West had a population of 10 people.

In the 2021 census, Baffle West had "no people or a very low population".

== Education ==
There are no schools in Baffle West. The nearest government primary school and secondary school (to Year 10) is Injune State School in Injune to the south. There are no schools offering secondary education to Year 12 within daily commuting distance; the alternatives are distance education and boarding school.
