= Upper Dawson, Queensland =

Upper Dawson
- Suburb
- Interactive map of Upper Dawson
- Coordinates: 25.3963°S 148.6211°E
- Country: Australia
- State: Queensland
- LGA: Maranoa Region
- Location: 49.7 km (30.9 mi) N of Injune; 140 km (87 mi) N of Roma; 491 km (305 mi) NW of Toowoomba; 655 km (407 mi) NW of Brisbane

Government
  - State electorate: Warrego
  - Federal division: Maranoa

Area
  - Total: 743.2 km^{2} (287.0 sq mi)

Population
  - Total: 0 (2021 census)
  - Density: 0.0000/km^{2} (0.0000/sq mi)
- Time zone: UTC+10:00 (AEST)
- Postcode: 4454
Suburbs around Upper Dawson
Carnarvon Park	Carnarvon Park	Arcadia Valley
Westgrove	Upper Dawson	Arcadia Valley
Westgrove	Baffle West	Beilba

Upper Dawson is a rural locality in the Maranoa Region, Queensland, Australia. In the 2021 census, Upper Dawson had "no people or a very low population".

== Geography ==
The Dawson River rises in the north of the locality and meanders in a south-easterly direction to the south-east of the locality where it forms the south-eastern boundary of the locality before exiting to the south-east (Beilba).

The Carnarvon Highway enters the locality from the north (Carnavon Park) and travels south through the locality, exiting to the south (Baffle West).

The northern part of the locality is within the Boxvale State Forest which extends into neighbouring Carnarvon Park to the north. Apart from this protected area, the land use is grazing on native vegetation.

== Demographics ==
In the 2016 census, Upper Dawson had a population of 27 people.

In the 2021 census, Upper Dawson had "no people or a very low population".

== Education ==
There are no schools in Upper Dawson. The nearest government primary schools are Arcadia Valley State School in neighbouring Arcadia Valley to the north-east and Injune State School in Injune to the south. The nearest government secondary school is Injune State School (to Year 10). However, some parts of the locality are too distant to attend any of these schools. Also, there are no schools providing education to Year 12 nearby. The alternatives are distance education and boarding school.
