= Hutton Creek, Queensland =

Hutton Creek
- Suburb
- Interactive map of Hutton Creek
- Coordinates: 25.6852°S 148.4266°E
- Country: Australia
- State: Queensland
- LGA: Maranoa Region
- Location: 32.8 km (20.4 mi) W of Injune; 123 km (76 mi) NNW of Roma; 474 km (295 mi) NW of Toowoomba; 601 km (373 mi) NW of Brisbane

Government
  - State electorate: Warrego
  - Federal division: Maranoa

Area
  - Total: 609.0 km^{2} (235.1 sq mi)

Population
  - Total: 32 (2021 census)
  - Density: 0.0525/km^{2} (0.1361/sq mi)
- Time zone: UTC+10:00 (AEST)
- Postcode: 4454
Suburbs around Hutton Creek
Womblebank	Westgrove	Baffle West
Womblebank	Hutton Creek	Simmie
Womblebank	Mount Hutton	Injune

Hutton Creek is a rural locality in the Maranoa Region, Queensland, Australia. In the 2021 census, Hutton Creek had a population of 32 people.

== Geography ==
The watercourse Hutton Creek rises in the centre of the locality and flows east, exiting the locality to neighbouring Simmie to the east. It becomes a tributary of the Dawson River in Baroondah in the Shire of Banana. The locality presumably takes its name from the creek.

Part of the Forrest State Forest is in the north of the locality, extending into neighbouring Westgrove. Apart from this protected area, the land use is grazing on native vegetation.

== Demographics ==
In the 2016 census, Hutton Creek had a population of 23 people.

In the 2021 census, Hutton Creek had a population of 32 people.

== Education ==
There are no schools in Hutton Creek. The nearest government school is Injune State School (Prep to Year 10) in neighbouring Injune to the south-east. There are no schools offering education to Year 12 nearby; the alternatives are distance education and boarding school.
