= Kinnoul =

Kinnoul may refer to:

- Kinnoul, Queensland, a locality in the Shire of Banana, Australia
- Kinnoull, Scotland
