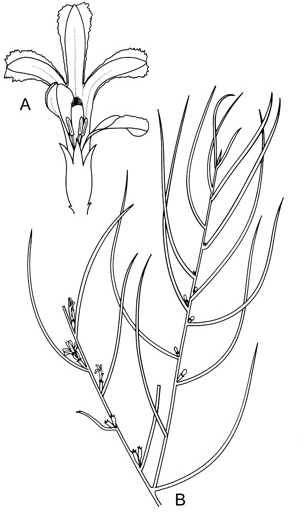
- A=flower; B=foliage

Scientific classification
- Kingdom: Plantae
- Clade: Tracheophytes
- Clade: Angiosperms
- Clade: Eudicots
- Clade: Asterids
- Order: Asterales
- Family: Goodeniaceae
- Genus: Goodenia
- Species: G. disperma

Binomial name
- Goodenia disperma F.Muell.

= Goodenia disperma =

Species of plant

Goodenia disperma is a species of flowering plant in the family Goodeniaceae and is endemic to Queensland. It is an erect undershrub with linear leaves on the stem, and racemes of white flowers.

== Description ==
Goodenia disperma is an erect undershrub with few branches and that typically grows to a height of 30 cm (12 in). The leaves are linear and arranged on the stem, 3–50 mm (0.12–1.97 in) long and 1.5–2 mm (0.059–0.079 in) wide. The flowers are arranged in racemes up to 150 mm (5.9 in) long with leaf-like bracts at the base, each flower on a pedicel 1–2 mm (0.039–0.079 in) long. The sepals are linear to lance-shaped with the narrower end towards the base, 4–5 mm (0.16–0.20 in) long and the corolla is white and about 9 mm (0.35 in) long. The lower lobes of the corolla are 3–5 mm (0.12–0.20 in) long with wings about 0.5 mm (0.020 in) wide. Flowering occurs from November to May and the fruit is an oval capsule about 8 mm (0.31 in) long.

== Taxonomy and naming ==
Goodenia disperma was first formally described in 1859 by Ferdinand von Mueller in Fragmenta Phytographiae Australiae. In 1990, Roger Charles Carolin selected specimens collected near the Dawson River as the lectotype. The specific epithet (disperma) means "double-seeded".

== Distribution and habitat ==
This goodenia grows in forest and woodland on the tableland from west of Townsville to west of Bundaberg in Queensland.

== Conservation status ==
Goddenia disperma is classified as of "least concern" under the Queensland Government Nature Conservation Act 1992.
