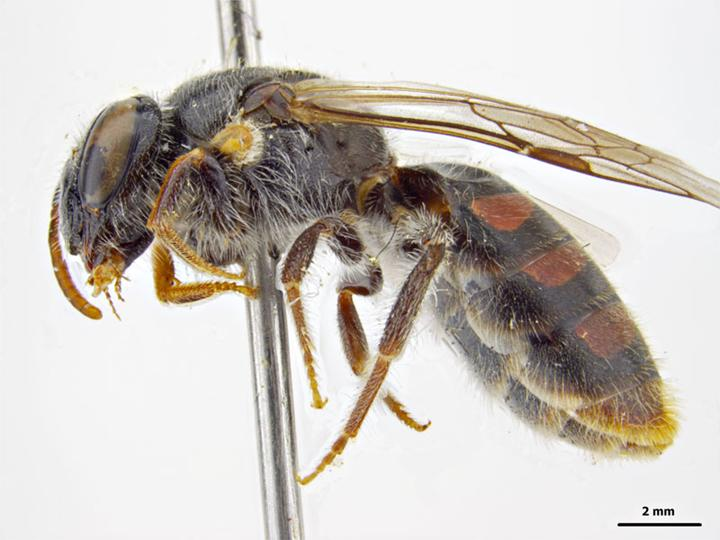
- Female

Scientific classification
- Kingdom: Animalia
- Phylum: Arthropoda
- Clade: Pancrustacea
- Class: Insecta
- Order: Hymenoptera
- Family: Colletidae
- Genus: Euhesma
- Species: E. yeatsi

Binomial name
- Euhesma yeatsi Exley, 2002

= Euhesma yeatsi =

Species of bee

Euhesma yeatsi, or Euhesma (Euhesma) yeatsi, is a species of bee in the family Colletidae and the subfamily Euryglossinae. It is endemic to Australia. It was described in 2002 by Australian entomologist Elizabeth Exley.

== Etymology ==
The specific epithet yeatsi honours David Yeates, a colleague of Exley who collected relevant specimens.

== Description ==
The body length of the female is 10 mm, wing length 7 mm. Colouration is mainly black and yellow.

== Distribution and habitat ==
The species occurs in southern Queensland. The type locality is the Chimneys in Mount Moffatt National Park, in the Maranoa Region.

== Behaviour ==
The adults are flying mellivores.
