= Rewan Police Horse Breeding Station =

Horse stud farm in Queensland

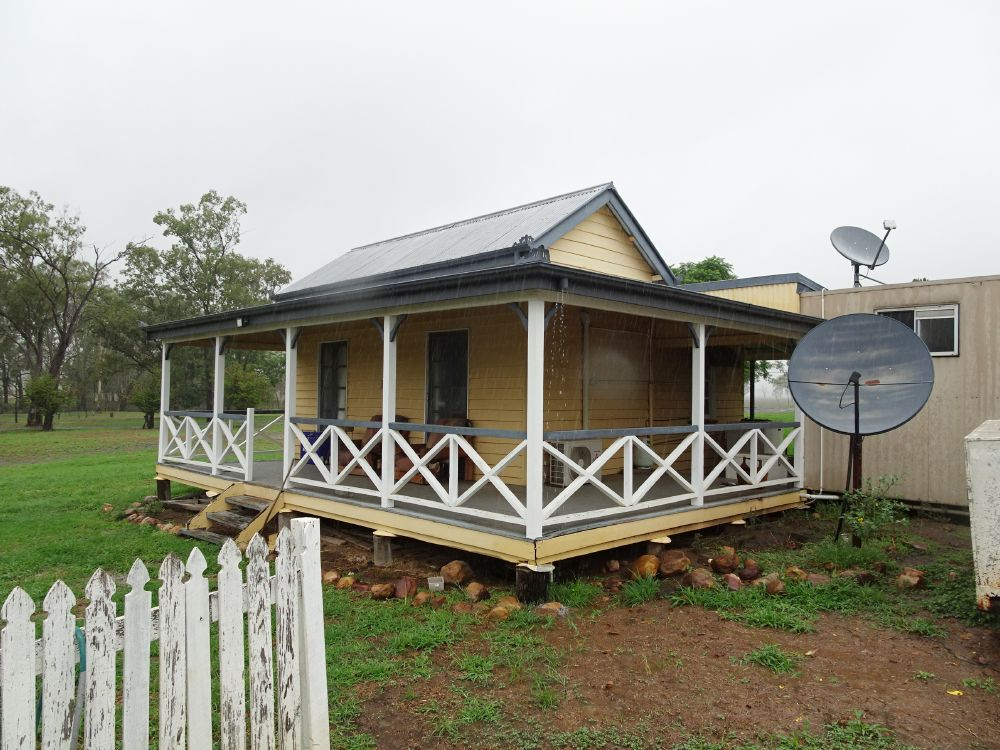
- Rewan Station cottage, 2019

- Location within Queensland
- 24.9574°S 148.3740°E
- Location: Rewan Road, Rewan, Central Highlands Region, Queensland, Australia

History
- Design period: 1900-1914 Early 20th century
- Built: 1911,1918

Queensland Heritage Register
- Official name: Rewan Police Horse Breeding Station (former); Rewan Horse Breeding Station (former); Rewan Police Horse Stud (former); Rewan Remount Breeding Station (former); Rewan Station
- Type: state heritage
- Designated: 31 May 2019
- Reference no.: 650094
- Theme: Exploiting, utilising and transforming the land: Pastoral activities; Maintaining order: Policing and maintaining law and order
- Builders: Queensland Police Service

Rewan Police Horse Breeding Station is a heritage-listed former horse stud farm at Rewan Road, Rewan, Central Highlands Region, Queensland, Australia. It was built in 1911 by Queensland Police Force, used until 1934. It is also known as Rewan Police Horse Stud, Rewan Remount Breeding Station, and Rewan Station. It was added to the Queensland Heritage Register on 31 May 2019.

== History ==
The former Rewan Police Horse Breeding Station, located approximately 64 kilometres (40 mi) southwest of the town of Rolleston in the Springsure district of Central Queensland, was established as a police horse stud in 1909. Comprising 108,000 acres (43,706ha) at its largest, the reserve was home to up to 771 horses and up to 2850 cattle until its closure in 1934. It was also a sanctuary for native birds and animals. It retains the stables (1911), the commissioner's cottage (1911) and a meat house (1918) from its stud era. Rewan Police Horse Breeding Station is the only surviving site of a police horse stud in Queensland. It is important in demonstrating the Queensland Government's policy of breeding horses, which were essential as transport, for the Queensland Police Force between 1904 and 1934. It has a special association with the Queensland Police Force, an important organisation in Queensland history.

A police presence in the geographical area that became the Colony of Queensland began in 1843, not long after free settlement commenced in at the former Moreton Bay penal settlement (now the city of Brisbane). The Police Act 1863 created a centralised system under a Commissioner of Police, who controlled the Queensland Police Force (QPF) and the Native Police (the Native Police were disbanded by the early 1900s). The Commissioner headed a hierarchy of inspectors and sub-inspectors who were in charge of sergeants and constables working in police districts throughout Queensland. However, the Commissioner of Police did not control the Water Police.

Until the mid-20th century, horses were essential equipment for the QPF. From 1864 the care of police horses was regulated and any town with a police station also had a police horse paddock. The QPF also supplied horses for ceremonial occasions, such as the 1901 proclamation of the Commonwealth, the visit of Imperial troops in 1901 and the arrival of the Duke and Duchess of York (later George VI and Queen Elizabeth The Queen Mother) and in 1927; as well as for the annual Royal National Association show in Brisbane. Horses were purchased for the QPF by the commissioner or by inspectors for their own districts. The care and replacement of police mounts was a significant part of the police budget each year.

Several factors provided the impetus for the Queensland Police Department to begin a horse breeding program. By 1904, Commissioner of Police, William Edward Parry-Okeden (Commissioner 1895–1905), was urging that the QPF breed its own horses to overcome the high cost of purchasing suitable ones. A good horse cost between £7 and £10. These horses were scarce due to stock losses during the Federation Drought (1898–1902); demand for horses during the Boer War (1899–1902); and because agents of the Indian, Japanese, Dutch and American armies were competing in the Australian market for remounts. Meanwhile, the QPF's need for horses remained high, as a significant proportion of its horses were old and needed replacing. The QPF in 1904 numbered 888 men including trackers, and over 1000 horses.

In 1904, the QPF commenced breeding remounts for its mounted police at Woodford, 79 kilometres (49 mi) north of Brisbane, using a 2,130-acre (860 ha) Reserve for a Police Paddock (formerly part of Durundur Station). Stallions were hired for stud work at Woodford between 1904 and 1908 for between £20 and £30 per stallion per year. Costs were kept down by growing feed on-site.

In January 1909, a report on the supply of police remounts in the other Australian states found that only the Northern Territory, which was forming five small, horse-breeding stations, was engaged in breeding police remounts. Victoria reportedly had discontinued the breeding of remounts 40 years previously, as it had proved costly and unsuccessful. However, there is evidence that a stud operated at Dandenong Police Paddocks 1853–1930 then at Bundoora 1930–c. 1949. No studs in the Northern Territory are known to remain.

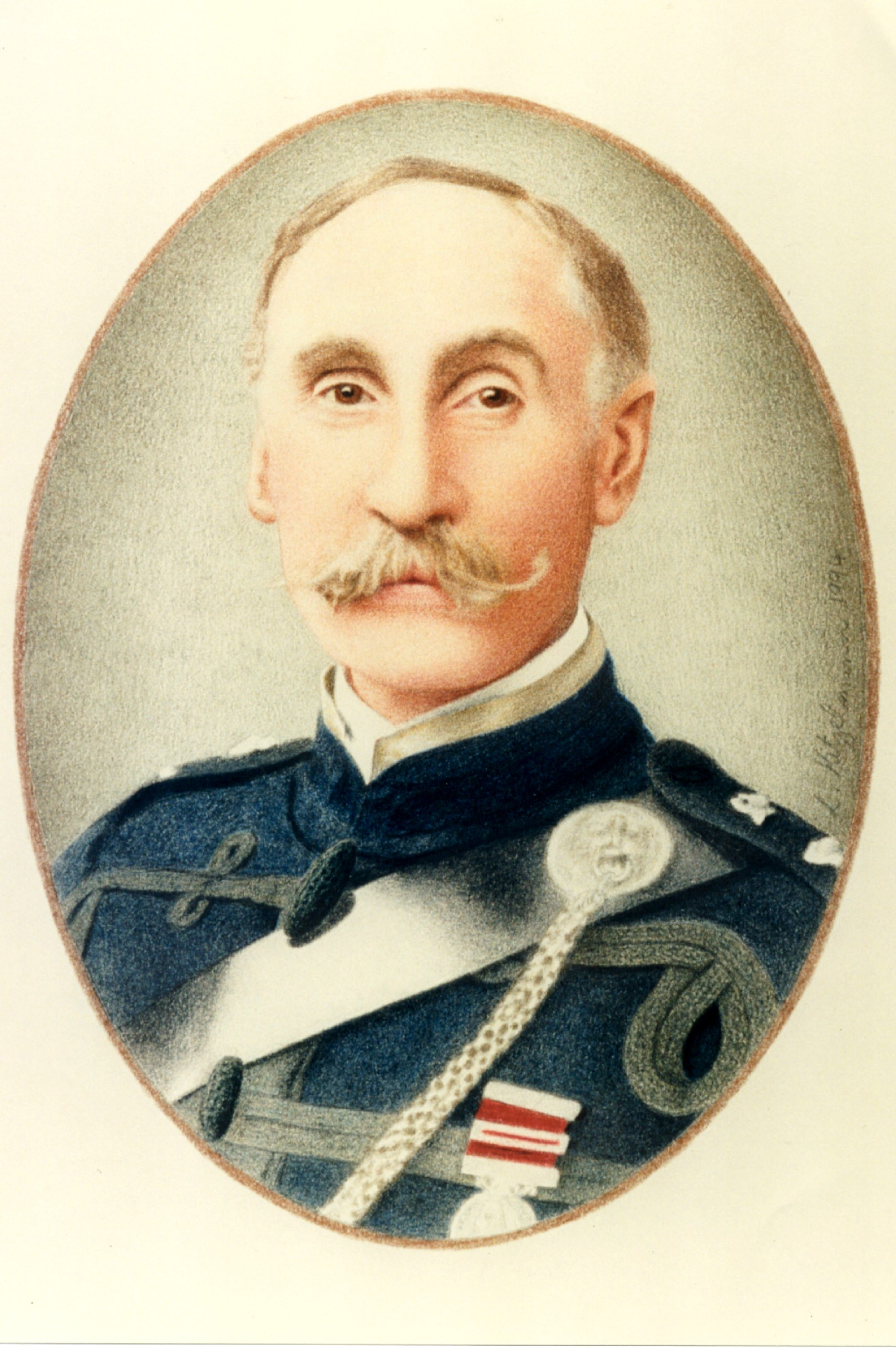
William Edward Parry-Okeden, Queensland Police Commissioner

When the Queensland Department of Public Lands wished to dispose of the reserve as Agricultural Farms and Perpetual Lease Selections, the QPF, under Commissioner William Geoffrey Cahill (Commissioner 1905–16), decided it would continue to breed its own remounts. Efforts to secure another, larger site near Brisbane were unsuccessful, but a suitable location in Central Queensland was found. In 1908, the Commissioner of Police announced he had obtained "a very fine reserve at Carnarvon (named 'Rewan') of 78,000 acres, resumed from the Consuelo leasehold for the purpose of breeding police remounts". Rewan Station, situated about 160 miles (260 km) north of Roma and 95 miles (153 km) south of Springsure, the nearest railway station, was proclaimed as a "reserve for stud farm for breeding police horses" in April 1909. Additionally, Rewan was to operate as a police station, conducting patrols in the district. The land was regarded as suitable for breeding horses because of its variety of grasses and good natural water supply from Carnarvon Creek, Johnny Woods Creek, Charcoal Creek, and Boggarawalla Creek, all with permanent water holes. As well as several permanent lagoons and swamps accessible to stock, Rewan was also declared a Reserve for the Protection and Preservation of Native Birds, under the Native Birds Protection Acts 1877–1884. Acting Sergeant John Joseph Campbell and Constable J. Ruthenberg were appointed as rangers of the reserve. The reserve later came under new legislation, which protected native animals and birds.

The nearest town to Rewan was Rolleston, established in 1862, at the crossing point on the Brown River (a tributary of the Comet River) that teamsters used when travelling between inland districts and Rockhampton. Charles Frederick Gregory, brother of the Queensland Surveyor General, Augustus Charles Gregory, surveyed Rolleston town site in 1865. It was later named after Christopher Rolleston (1817–88), a local landholder. Rolleston was a former Commissioner of Crowns Land for the Darling Downs, and brother-in-law of the Leslie brothers, who lead the settlement of Darling Downs from 1840. From 1860, Rolleston, with Louis Hope and Alfred Denison, acquired extensive runs in the Leichhardt district centred upon Springsure Station near Rolleston. A branch railway line to Springsure opened from Emerald (on the Central Western railway line) in August 1887, improving transport to the district. In the first two decades of the 20th century, the large pastoral leases in the Springsure district (within the Bauhinia Shire from 1902) were resumed for closer settlement.

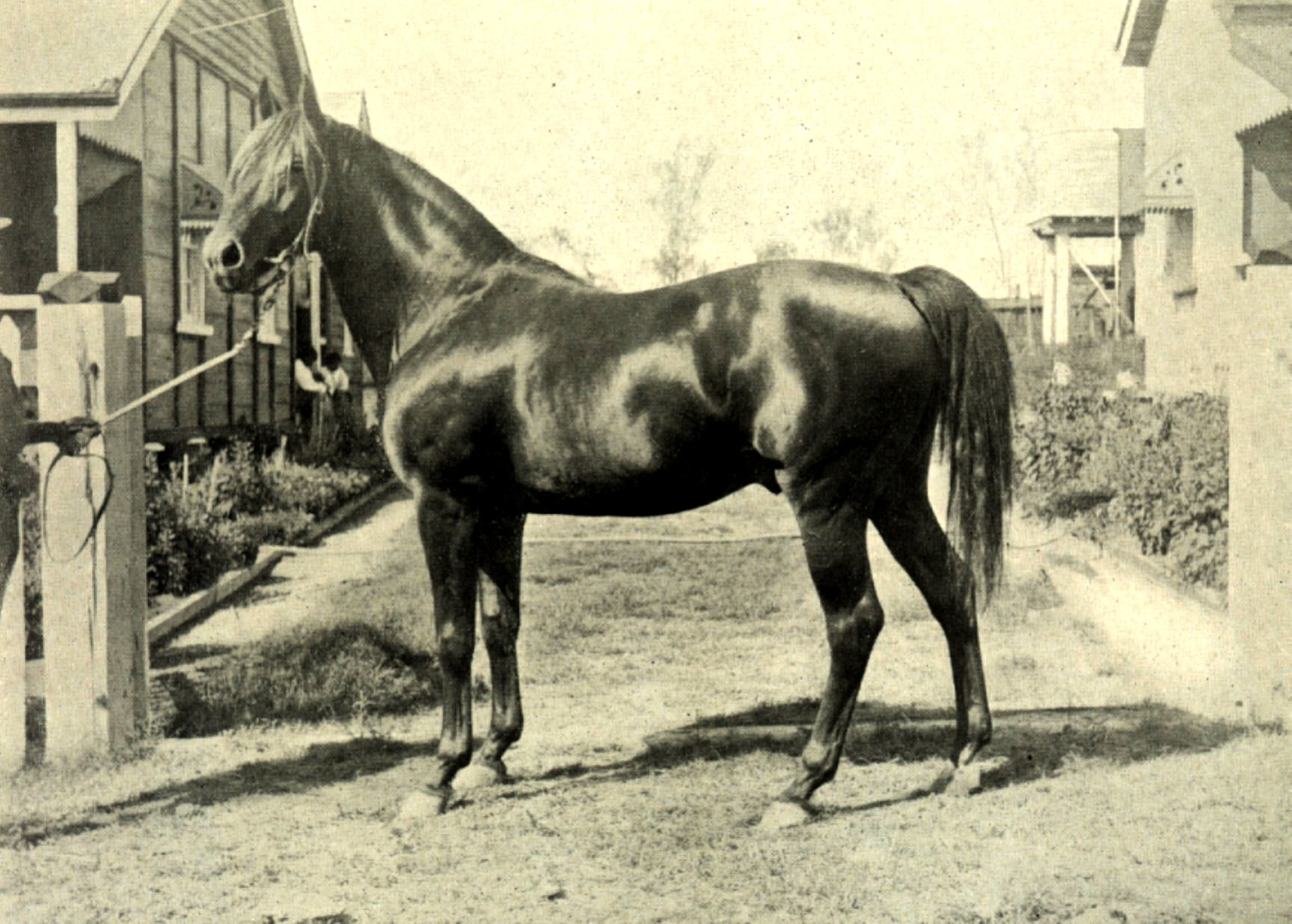
The stallion "Libertine" was sent by rail from the Woodford Stud to Rewan as one of the initial breeding stock, 1910

Rewan Police Horse Breeding Station commenced in mid-1909 when the Woodford horses, together with all available mares owned by the QPF in the various police districts, were transferred there. These totalled 76 mares, 37 geldings and 24 foals. Three stallions were purchased: "Mack" (£215), "Libertine" (£157/10) and "Bonny Boy" (£63). Another 35 mares were purchased from Jimbour Station and Salisbury Plains Station, and breeding operations commenced in the 1909 breeding season.

At the time of the QPF's takeover of Rewan in mid-1909, some improvements were already on site. These included a 5-room, iron-bark slab stockman's hut, suffering from white ant attack, and other out-house buildings, which were "rough and not considered of any value and should be pulled down". A good stockyard was sited on a sand ridge behind the stockman's hut, which, after repair, would meet the stud's requirements for some years. Fencing consisted of about 25 miles (40 km) of outer boundaries and two horse paddocks, which were in a poor state of repair.

Requirements to make it habitable and functional were: accommodation for staff, animals and equipment; a telephone connection for the property to function as a police station; and boundary fencing. The work was undertaken by the police constables, who cut the trees, pit-sawed the timber, and erected the buildings. The only materials imported were the window sashes and iron. By the end of 1909, mustering yards had been erected and fencing had commenced. By December 1910, the existing slab stockman's hut had been repaired for constables' quarters, and a house with detached kitchen was erected for use by Acting Sergeant John Joseph Campbell, who was in charge of the stud and the remount breeding program. The sergeant's quarters and constables' quarters are no longer on site.

Stables were erected about 100 yards (91 m) behind the sergeant's quarters. The building was 78 by 13 feet (23.8 m × 4.0 m) with a skillion roof of iron, with guttering to its front. The frame was sawn timber, with dressed split slabs for its walls and partitions. The stables were divided into two stalls for stallions 14 by 13 feet (4.3 m × 4.0 m), one at each end of the building; a forage room 10 by 13 feet (3.0 m × 4.0 m); a buggy shed; a dray shed; and three stalls each 8 by 13 feet (2.4 m × 4.0 m). The buggy shed was enclosed by two hardwood doors. Immediately in front of the two stallion stalls were two substantial yards.

A windmill was erected near Carnarvon Creek, where there was a good quantity of water, about 200 yards (180 m) from the sergeant's quarters. Water was pumped into a 2,000-imperial-gallon (9,100 L; 2,400 US gal) galvanised iron tank erected behind these quarters, on a stand 9 feet (2.7 m) high. Pipes from this tank lead to the sergeant's quarters and both stallion stalls. A meat house, for meat processing, was also erected, as an essential component of the station.

The accommodation for the two to four police Aboriginal trackers employed on Rewan between 1909 and 1934 was inferior to that provided for other staff. An image from c. 1909–17 of one residence shows a dirt-floored, slab-walled and bark-roofed hut, with boughs and rocks used to hold the roof in place. Their accommodation in 1920 was described as "big, comfortable and waterproof huts". The trackers on Rewan are known to have undertaken horse- and cattle-related duties, and fence- and yard-building. Elsewhere in Queensland, trackers performed kitchen duties, cared for horses, checked fences and looked for trespassing stock. By early 1911, a second dwelling had been constructed southeast of the sergeant's quarters, to accommodate the Commissioner of Police and other government officials when they inspected the property. Initially it was called the commissioner's cottage, but was later referred to as the officers' quarters. This timber-framed and -clad building with verandahs to its north and west elevations, had a corrugated metal roof with acroteria, and post-and-rail verandah balustrades. As it was intended for periodic short-term use by official visitors, it comprised only two bedrooms and a bathroom. By the end of April 1911, the sergeant's quarters and the commissioner's cottage, along with well-tended gardens to the front, had been fenced in with 124 feet (38 m) of painted picket fence, including two wicket gates and two large double gates, at the front and the back of the buildings; as well as 369 feet (112 m) of split paling fence.

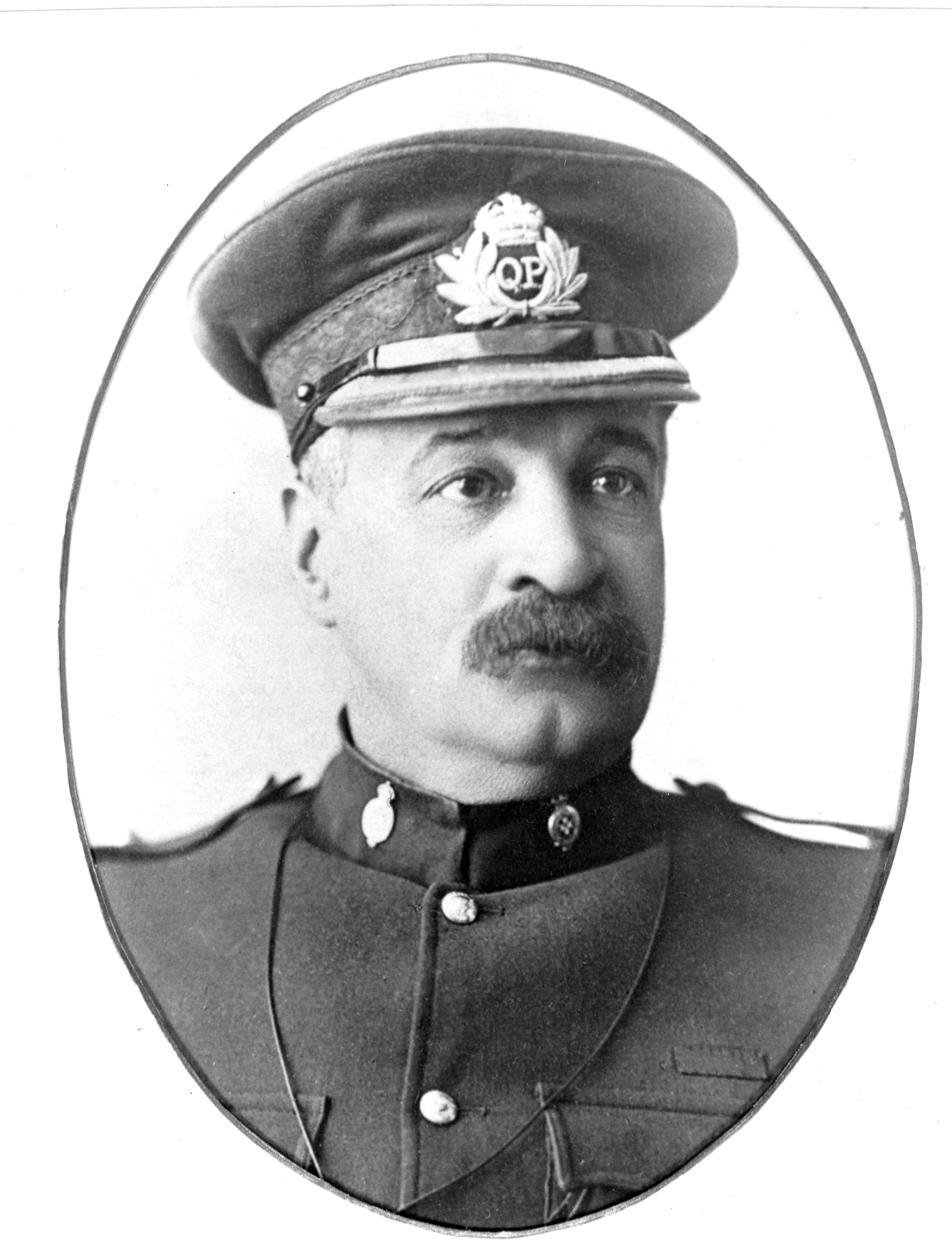
Frederic Charles Urquhart, Queensland Police Commissioner

Periodic visits by officers of the QPF and the Home Department, and dignitaries took place. The first occurred in April 1911, when Chief Inspector Frederic Urquhart reported excellent progress had been made in building, fencing, clearing and ring-barking on Rewan. As intended, Rewan also served as a police station and patrols were being made. Constable P. Lee was appointed ranger of the reserve for native birds and native animals at the stud farm at Rewan after the transfer of Constable Rothenburg to another station. Prickly pear of the tree variety was present on the property, but was confined to an area of about 200 acres (81 ha) of brigalow scrub about 14 miles (23 km) from the station. Urquhart recommended doubling the herd of cows and adding 50 mares and another stallion before August 1911, and further fencing. He was convinced the place would be profitable and of immense service in providing police remounts.

Additions were subsequently made to the stud. Horse numbers rose to 331 by 31 July 1911, then to 400 by 31 July 1912. In 1913, the thoroughbred stallion "Turkish Lad" was purchased at the National Exhibition in Brisbane and sent with 12 mares to Rewan, and two further mares were purchased from Eulolo and Roxborough Downs Stations. By 1914, the number of stud mares had reached 215.

Rewan-bred horses were first supplied to the mounted police in 1912, when 69 trained remounts were provided. The Commissioner of Police reported that in the 1912–13 financial year the cost of purchasing horses for the department had decreased by £500, and he expected Rewan would produce well-bred horses in fair numbers in the future. In 1913 there was praise for the 20 Woodford- and Rewan-bred horses sent to Brisbane for use in escort work in the metropolitan area. In June 1913, 17 horses from Rewan were also despatched to Longreach.

Farming activities commenced on Rewan in 1913. In June, a new timber shed stored its crop of pumpkins. Farm implements were sent there, to enable ploughing of 13 or 14 acres (5.3 or 5.7 ha) of land for lucerne and other crops, including oats. In May 1918, Rewan was growing lucerne and had already stored lucerne hay for feed.

However, during 1915 and 1916, environmental factors hampered Rewan's development. Drought halted agriculture and reduced foal numbers, while dingoes killed calves. In this period only 20 foals were born from 124 brood mares. Flooding late in 1916, which destroyed three tons of panicum hay at Rewan, ended the drought.

Afterwards, the stud resumed its breeding success. During 1916, 56 remounts were allocated for duty, valued at £840. There were also 5 bulls and 497 head of cattle on the property, valued at £2948. In the 1916–17 financial year, there were 10 bulls and 566 head of cattle, valued at £4320 and cattle had been sold for good prices that year. In the 1916–17 financial year, 70 remounts were sent out for duty to various districts (value £1050), and there were 669 horses on Rewan Station. In the 1916–17 financial year, 100 fat bullocks were sold at £15 per head, and 4 fat cows at £13 per head.

In July 1916, the Home Secretary, the Hon. John Saunders Huxham, James Christian Peterson, MLA, and the Under Secretary of the Home Office, William J Gall, inspected Rewan Station and requested a report on improvements required to make the property viable, and their approximate cost. Subsequently, the addition of cattle and a stallion to Rewan's stock was approved, resulting in the purchase of the stallion "Lord Elderslie", for £156/10, in May 1917. There were 576 cattle on the property after the sale of 100 bullocks to the Central Queensland Meat Export Company at £15 per head. Stud stallions were: "Libertine", "Turkish Lad", "Bonny Boy", "Brisbane" and "Lord Elderslie", while one, 'Archie'/'Archer', was to be sold.

Improvements to Rewan buildings, approved in September 1916, were carried out by the Department of Public Works (DPW) during 1918, using timber sourced from Meteor Downs. The buildings included a new meat house, erected at a cost of £150. It was constructed with its door in a location that differed from its DPW plan.

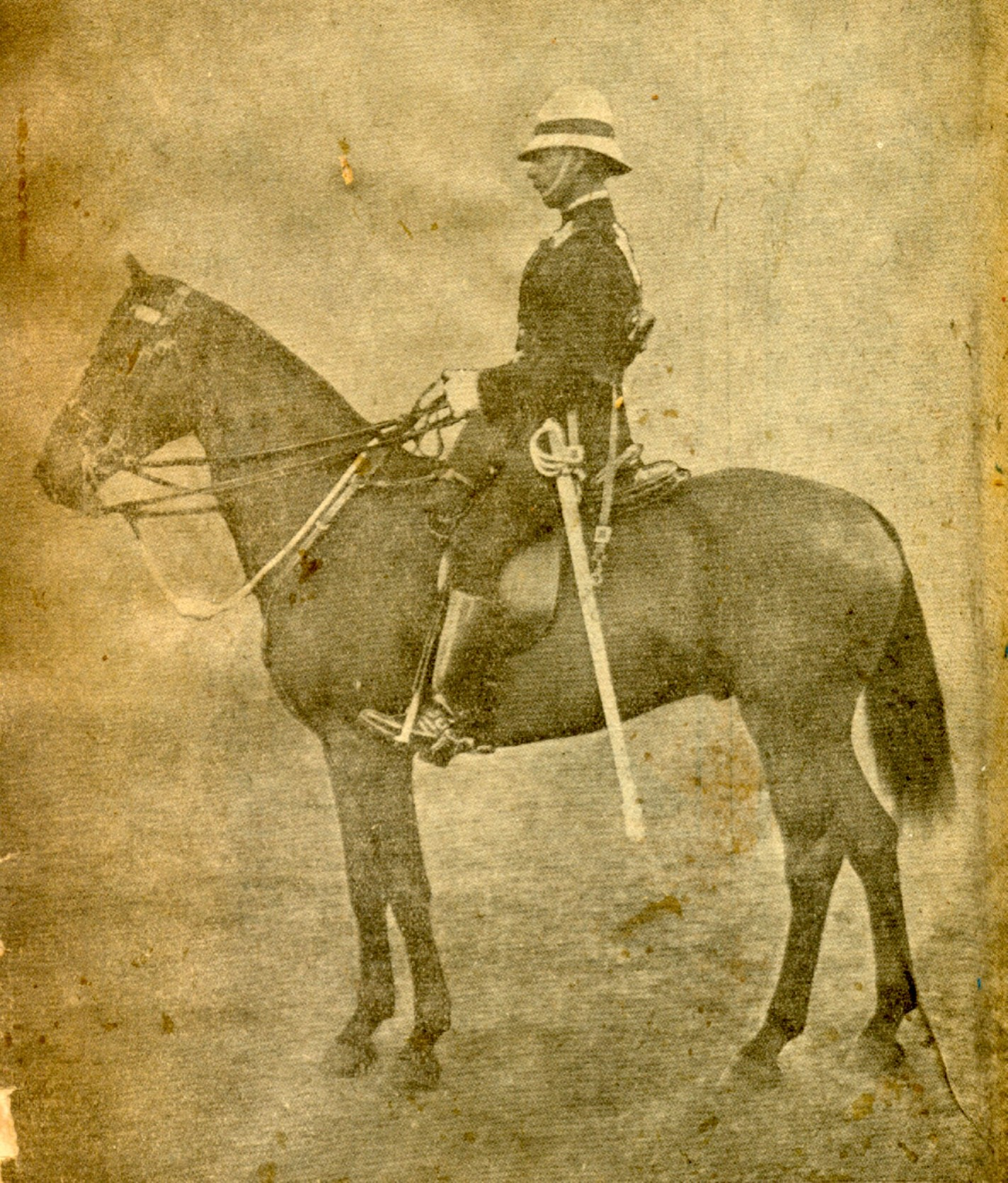
The horse "Brisbane" from the Rewan stock was sent to London in the charge of Constable Fenwick Wilson (astride the horse) as a gift from the Queensland Government to King George V, July 1911

The 1920s were filled with praise for Rewan's horses. During his Queensland visit in 1920, Edward, Prince of Wales requested to see the world-famous Queensland troopers and their mounts. He congratulated the Commissioner of Police (Frederic Charles Urquhart, Commissioner 1917–21), Inspector Carroll, and Sub-Inspector Campbell, who supervised the police stud, saying he much admired the horses. Inspector Carroll and the officer-in-charge of the Rewan police stud farm, Sub-Inspector Campbell, were similarly complimented. King George V for his coronation in 1911 had been presented with the Rewan-bred horse "Brisbane" from the Queensland Government.

Official inspections continued in May 1921 when the Home Secretary, William McCormack, accompanied by J C Peterson, MLA for Normanby, and W H Gall, the Under Secretary of the Home Department, visited the Central district and spent two days inspecting Rewan. At this time there were about 600 horses and 1300 Shorthorn beef cattle on the property. In October of the same year, the new Commissioner of Police, Patrick Short (Commissioner 1921–25), also inspected Rewan Station. During 1921, 112 horses were sent from Rewan to various districts as remounts, the highest number provided in one year during its lifetime.

Improvements to the stud in the 1920s included reroofing the hay shed and additional stables with second-hand, galvanised iron (1922) and the addition of 30,000 acres of leasehold land from Consuelo Holding, north of Rewan (1922).

While Rewan concentrated on providing remounts for the mounted police, the motorisation of Queensland and the wider world was progressing rapidly. The QPF was failing to keep up, largely due to budget constraints. Successive commissioners had tried to provide more modern transport. In 1896 Commissioner Parry-Okeden introduced bicycles for patrols, which were slowly distributed around the colony. However, at a cost of about £13 per bike, they were more expensive than horses. Bicycle numbers reached 96 in 1914, but many were old and worn out and funds were not available to replace them or increase their numbers. More bicycles were purchased in the 1920s.

Between 1917 and 1924, Commissioner Urquhart advocated the introduction of motor cycles to supplement bicycles in country districts and requested 50, but realised the expense prohibited their purchase. Finally, in 1925 three motor cycles with side cars and 21 new bicycles were acquired, mainly for use in the metropolitan area. Motor cars for the police headquarters were hired as needed. Increasingly, police used their private vehicles at work.

By 30 June 1926, police horse numbers had fallen to 758 and the Commissioner of Police stated: "It is obvious that motor vehicles are filling calls that were formerly met by horses...". The QPF purchased two motor vans to transport prisoners in 1926 and by 30 June 1929, 12 motor cycles were in use. However, it was not until after Cecil James Carroll was appointed Commissioner of Police (1934–49), that motorisation of the QPF proceeded rapidly.

Environmental threats made the latter years of the 1920s difficult for Rewan Station. Successive drought between 1926 and 1932 affected the breeding, breaking and handling of horses, and delayed distribution of remounts in 1927. In November 1929, fire threatened Rewan from the north and west for over three weeks and required about 18 men to subdue it. Prickly pear had spread in Bauhinia Shire during the early years of the century and continued to require control measures on Rewan Station until its eradication after 1930 through biological control.

New stock was added to Rewan's stud in the late 1920s and praise continued for its horses, although QPF horse numbers continued to fall, reaching 616 on 1 July 1929. Notably, in August 1929, the well-known racehorse and sire, "Had-I-Wist", grandson of the 1890 Melbourne Cup winner "Carbine", was presented to the Queensland Government by the Commonwealth authorities and sent to Rewan Station as a stud horse. Mundoolun-bred cattle were added to the Rewan stock in January 1930.

Praise for Rewan horses continued to be received in the late 1920s and early 1930s. In 1927, The Duke and Duchess of York expressed very high appreciation of the police horses which formed part of their escorts, and members of their party also commended the remounts, stressing their "symmetry and tractability". The Governor General of Australia and the Governor of Queensland, Sir John Goodwin, also "praised the class of remounts forming the escorts". In 1929, the Governor inspected "Had-I-Wist" and about 16 police horses bred at Rewan at the Petrie Terrace police depot and expressed his satisfaction with the quality and appearance of the horses. In 1932, Governor Sir Leslie Wilson and his daughter were enthusiastic about 13 Rewan-bred police horses paraded at the Petrie Terrace depot. The horses seen by Sir Leslie Wilson and his daughter included Fretsaw, Hero and Grumpy, three prize-winners at the previous Brisbane Exhibition and also two or three young remounts in training.

Despite such praise, from 1929, members of the Queensland Parliament, the Queensland Police Union and Queensland newspapers criticised Rewan Station and the police horse breeding program. In the Queensland Parliament in 1929, the Home Secretary, J. C. Peterson (1929–32) was questioned by Thomas Alberto Dunlop, (Independent, Rockhampton), about the high cost of salaries and allowances, and forage for horses at Rewan Station. The Minister replied that salaries varied from time to time and that forage was supplied for the Rewan stallions. He also reported that 251 cattle had been sold in the previous financial year, realising £2069 5s. In 1930, Arthur Jones (Labor, Burke) questioned the Home Secretary about the annual cost of running Rewan Station and its total cost since establishment. The total amount spent by the government on Rewan Station since 1909 was £54,080. Upkeep of Rewan in the 1929–30 financial year was £3470. The value of remounts bred at Rewan and sent to police stations that year was £420, being 26 horses (14 to Townsville district and 12 to Cloncurry district), as drought conditions in that year affected sending out horses to stations.

From 1930 to 1933, the Queensland Police Union conducted a concerted campaign against the Rewan stud and in support of motorisation of the QPF. Queensland newspapers quoted Queensland Police Union Journal articles stating that police thought Rewan Station was a "white-elephant" because the land was unsuitable for horse breeding because it was too far south for horses acclimatised for northern/western service and the Rewan horses were unsuitable for the work they were meant to do. The union also complained Rewan needed a sub-inspector, two constables, and a number of trackers to manage it, meaning the salaries alone were over £2000 a year. The Telegraph advised that "The Government [should] view this matter seriously and have it dealt with purely from a business, utility and economic viewpoint". The Police Union continued its campaign to close the police horse stud into the first half of 1933 and appeared to exaggerate Rewan Station's costs. The Evening News quoted the Police Union's June meeting that hoped authorities "would have no hesitation selling the Rewan horse-breeding establishment, which was costing upwards of £50,000 a year [actually about £3470], a wasteful expenditure in a futile effort to prop up antiquated methods and ideas". In June 1933, the Home Secretary (Edward M Hanlon) was expected to confer with the Police Commissioner (William H Ryan, 1925–34) about the closure of Rewan Station. The site was considered for an Aboriginal settlement, but as the land was pastoral, not agricultural, that idea lapsed.

A galvanising factor in Rewan's fate was the conviction of its officer-in-charge, Sub-Inspector Campbell, for tax fraud and his dismissal from the Force in August 1933. Thomas Jones, superintendent of the farm home for boys at Westbrook, was sent to Rewan to take charge. His report on Rewan Station outlined the history of the breeding program and provided advice about future strategies. He found no misconduct in the management of the government's cattle and horses. He advised the station needed fencing and building repairs, and ringbarking, concluding:

"Rewan should be ringbarked and given a chance. The policy laid down when the place was first started was an admirable one and if carried out properly Rewan would be today ... doing well what was intended it should do. I... have no hesitation in saying that Rewan has not had a chance of carrying out its programme.... If it is decided to carry on it would not be difficult nor expensive to place the property under practical working conditions.... Had proper inspections been carried out the place would have been improved in every way instead of being allowed to drift."

However, in the economic and political climate of 1933, Jones' advice was not taken and the stud's closure was announced in October 1933. The State was experiencing the worst worldwide economic depression since the 1890s. State-owned enterprises in general were out of favour after the failure of the Labor government's State Enterprises initiatives (1915–1925). The combined loss sustained by the state stations and the state-acquired Chillagoe railway, mines and smelter was £2 million. Although Rewan Police Horse Breeding Station was not part of that scheme, there was a popular view that the Government should not run business enterprises. According to Home Secretary Hanlon, Rewan Station had cost £60,000 over its lifetime for a return of £33,000. Hanlon believed there was no excuse for the failure of Rewan as the property was 108,000 acres (44,000 ha) of the best land in Central Queensland and was well-watered. In 1932 there had been 140 mares on the holding but only two foals were reared. He believed the mares were totally unsuitable for breeding police remounts, as through sending away the best mares for police work and keeping the rejects for breeding, there had been a systematic deterioration of the stock. The reasons cited for the police horse stud's closure were that its location was too inaccessible for regular inspection and regular control by officers of the department and it had not produced horses suitable for North Queensland work.

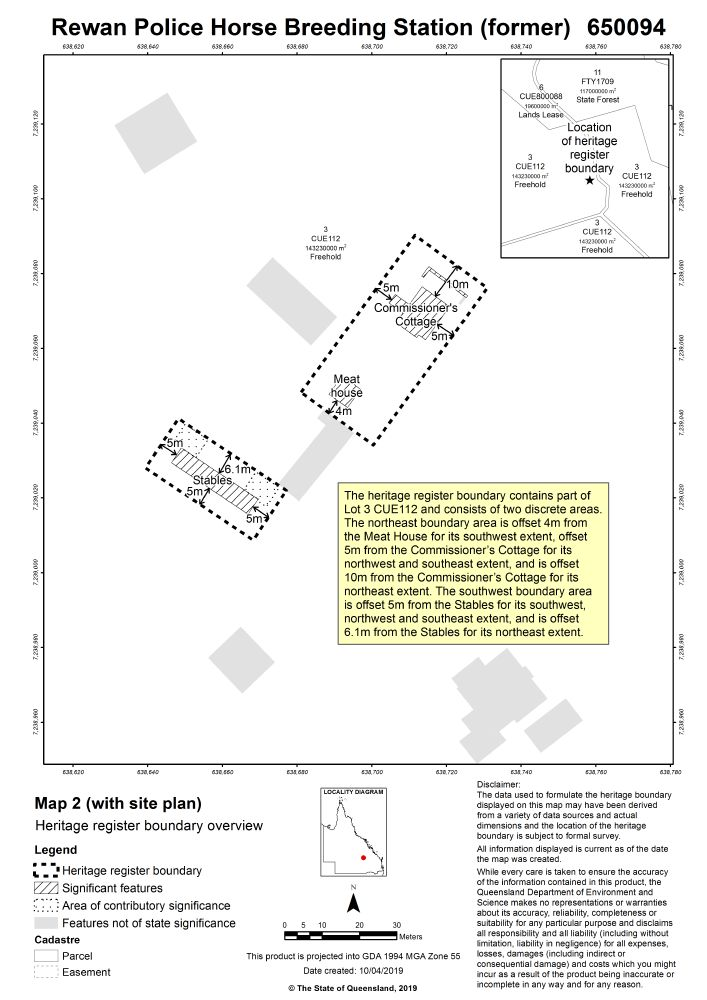
Site map, 2019

In 1934, Rewan Station was divided into two pastoral properties and allocated by ballot. The value of improvements on Rewan Station at the time of its sale was £1570/16. The building improvements were:

- the Commissioner's cottage comprising two rooms, bathroom and front verandah
- Sub-Inspector Campbell's quarters comprising eight rooms, with front and side verandahs
- single constables' quarters comprising two rooms, front verandah, small kitchen and an improvised room on the back verandah
- a meat house
- three huts for native trackers' accommodation
- stabling accommodation for the stallions
- a number of sheds and yards.

The stud horses, cattle and plant were disposed of by September 1934. Of the horses: 39 went to Springsure as police remounts; 34 were forwarded to Woorabinda Aboriginal Settlement; 12 were sold locally; and 263 were herded over the Carnarvon Range for auction at Charleville on 12 September 1934. During the journey, 25 died or were destroyed including the valuable stallions, "Had-I-Wist" and "Ercanil", and 11 foals; and 5 went missing (strayed or died). Of the 1464 cattle on Rewan Station: 121 were sold to Lakes Creek Meatworks; 13 bulls were sold to John Rewan Campbell of Rolleston; 1300 were transferred to Woorabinda Aboriginal Settlement; and 30 died. The proceeds of the livestock sales were £1240.6.10. Plant and loose tools were transferred to Woorabinda Aboriginal Settlement and to the Springsure Police Station to be used in police stations. Additionally, there were 187 horses missing since 1931, presumed dead due to drought. The stud horses, in poor condition due to drought, were herded to Charleville, during a three-week period, at a fast pace and through stretches of country with little grass or water.

During its lifetime, Rewan Police Horse Breeding Station bred, trained and supplied 1029 remounts to the QPF.

By the end of the 1930s, the QPF's horse breeding program was remembered more positively. The Wingham Chronicle & Manning River Observer newspaper stated in 1938: "At Rewan some of the finest horses used in the Queensland Police Force were bred". In his 1941 obituary, Patrick Short, former Commissioner of Police (1921–25), was credited with making great improvements to Queensland police horses through the Rewan stud.

From 1934 to 2019, Rewan Station has operated as a 17,500 hectares (43,000 acres) cattle property. In 2019, it retains three buildings from its former role as a police horse stud: the former stables (1911), the former Commissioner's cottage (1911), and the meat house (1918). These are the only built remains of a former police horse stud in Queensland and are important in demonstrating the Queensland Government's policy, between 1904 and 1934, of breeding horses for the Queensland Police Force, an important organisation in Queensland history.

== Description ==
The former Rewan Police Horse Breeding Station is located approximately 64 kilometres (40 mi) southwest of the Central Queensland town of Rolleston. Positioned on a rise, on the north bank of a creek bend, the station complex is accessed via Rewan Road to the east. It retains three timber-framed buildings that are associated with the occupation and operation of the early 20th century police station and horse stud.

Standing in their original locations, the buildings are oriented facing northeast and are roughly aligned along a northeast to southwest axis: the Commissioner's cottage, facing and visible from Rewan Road; the former meat house approximately 20 metres (66 ft) to the rear of the cottage; and the former stables approximately 35 metres (115 ft) further to the southwest.

=== Commissioner's cottage (1911) ===
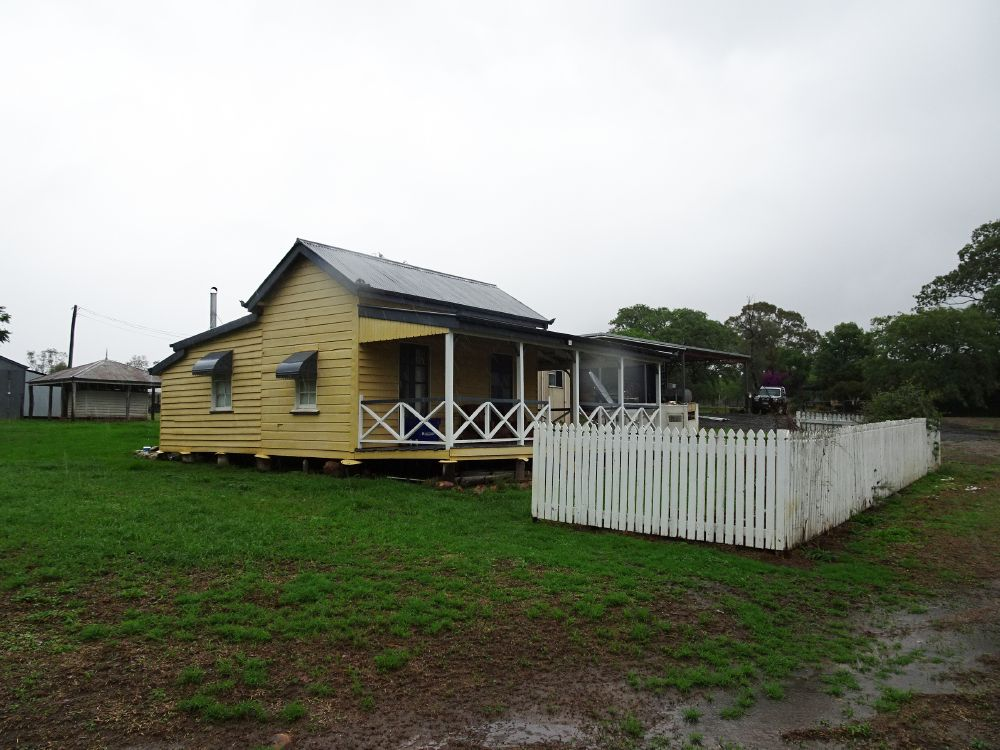
Cottage from the east, 2019

The cottage is a lowset, timber-framed and -clad building comprising an original (1911) gable-roofed core. It has a later (post-1932) skillion-roofed extension to the rear (southwest).

The core is rectangular in plan and has an L-shaped verandah wrapping the front (northeast) and side (northwest, part former bathroom). The skillion verandah roof is set below and at a shallower pitch to the gable. The core contains one room, but retains evidence of its original two-bedroom layout in the form of the top-rail of the (former) dividing partition and separate doorways accessing the front verandah. A window and doorway opening are also retained in the rear (southwest) wall.

A garden occupies the area at the front of the cottage; it retains garden beds with stone edging and is fenced on part of its original alignment (parallel with the cottage front and a return at the northwest end).

=== Former meat house (1918) ===
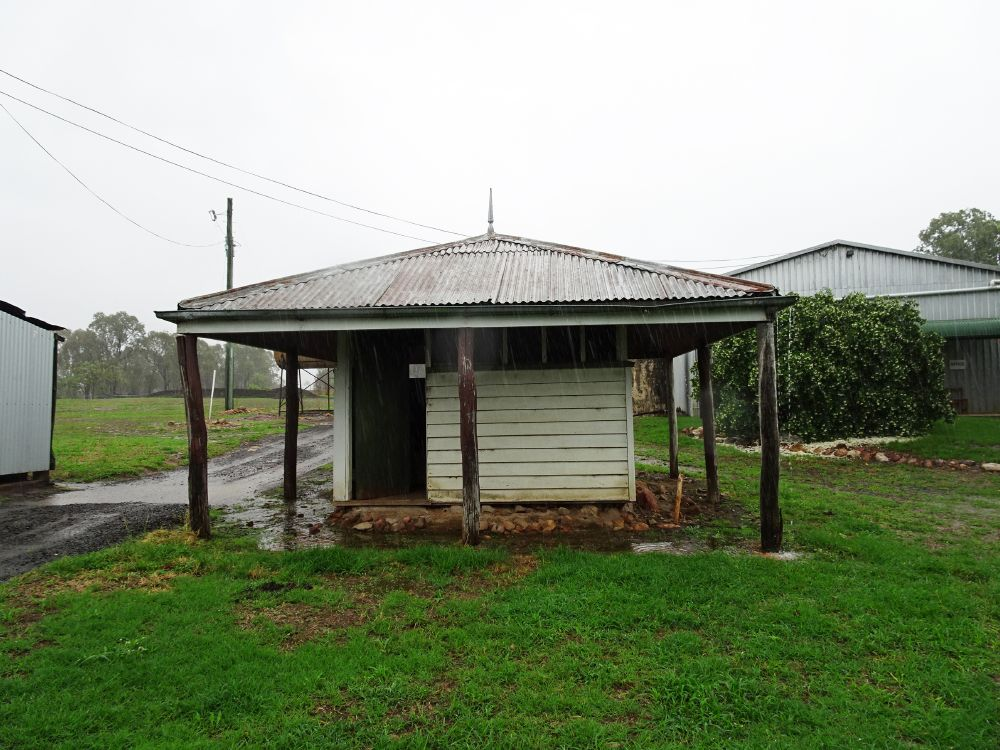
Meat house, 2019

The meat house is a lowset, timber-framed and -clad building with a pyramid roof. Square in plan, it comprises a one-room core (former butchering room), surrounded by overhanging eaves supported on rough-hewn, round timber posts.

The core has a thin concrete slab floor on a raised platform of earth and undressed stone. It is accessed by a single door and has high-level screened openings for ventilation on all sides.

=== Former stables (1911) ===
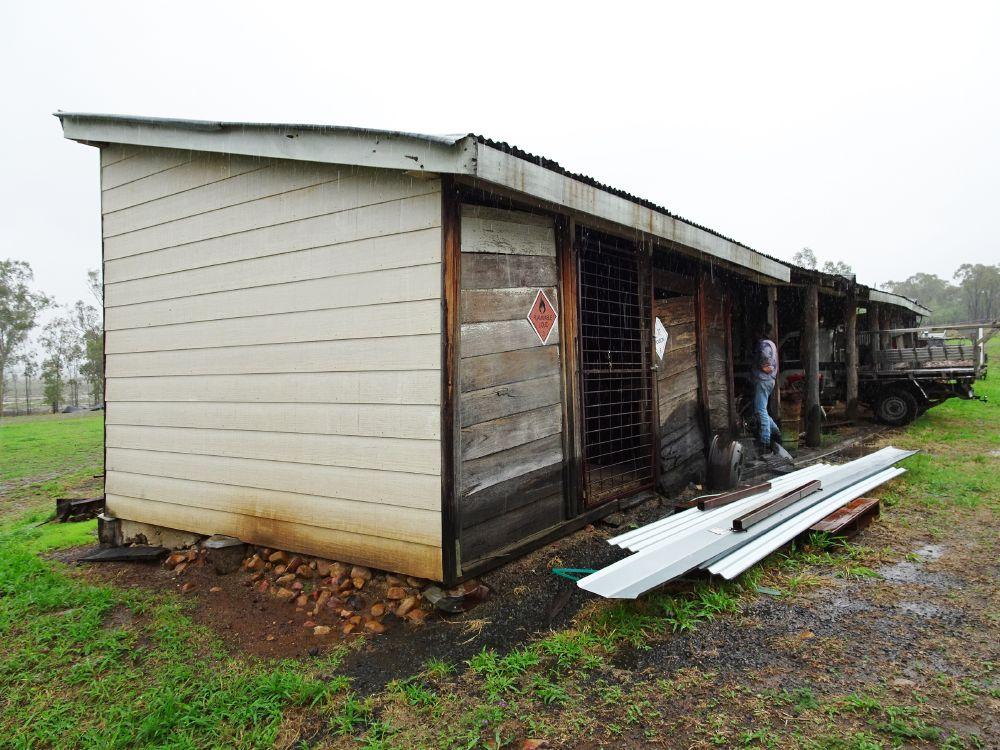
Stables, 2019

The former stables is a long, narrow, lowset, timber-framed building with a skillion roof that slopes down to the long-sided front (northeast). It is one 13 feet (4.0 m) stall in width and enclosed on the southeast, southwest and northwest sides. Two enclosed rooms (former stallion stall and feed room) are at the southeast end of the building; an open-plan area (former open-fronted dray shed and three partitioned stalls with post-and-rail fronts) is at the centre; and two partially enclosed rooms (former enclosed buggy shed and stallion stall) are at the northwest end.

The intactness of the building reflects its continued use as part of a working pastoral property, with sections of original timber slab and post-and-rail construction deteriorated, demolished or replaced. Original and early fabric is concentrated at the southeast and northwest ends, and includes horizontal timber slab walls and framing, and earth and timber (former feed and buggy rooms) flooring.

== Heritage listing ==
Rewan Police Horse Breeding Station was listed on the Queensland Heritage Register on 31 May 2019 having satisfied the following criteria.

The place is important in demonstrating the evolution or pattern of Queensland's history.

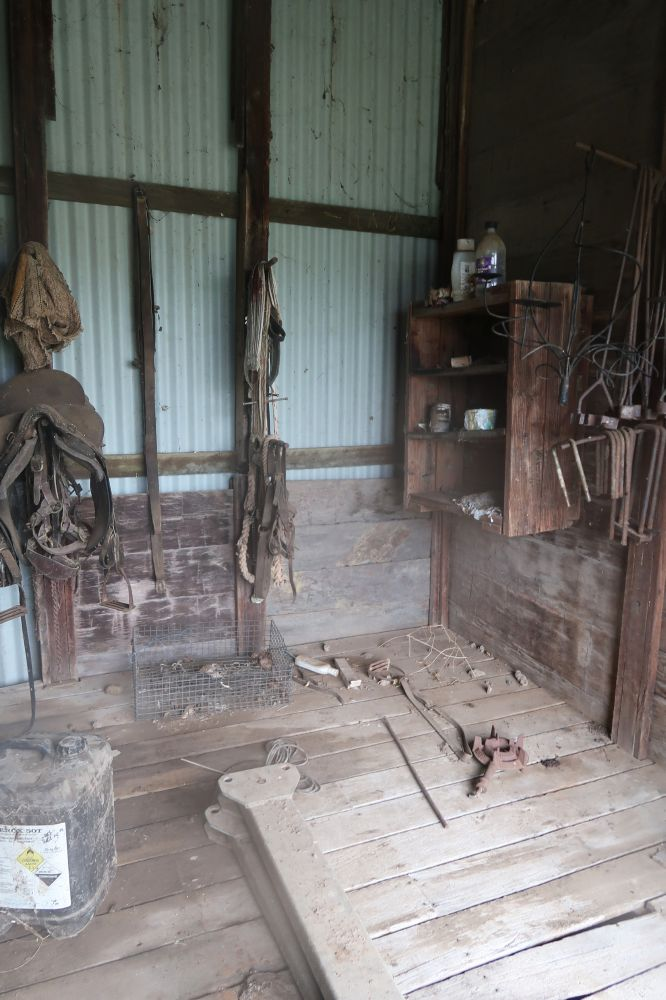
Feed shed within the stables, 2019

Rewan Police Horse Breeding Station (former) (1909–34), is important in demonstrating the Queensland Government's policy of breeding horses, which were essential as transport, for the Queensland Police Force between 1904 and 1934. The place retains important surviving evidence of this rare police horse stud, which was constructed and maintained primarily by members of the Queensland Police Force, including: the former stables (1911); the former Commissioner's cottage (1911); and a meat house (1918).

The place demonstrates rare, uncommon or endangered aspects of Queensland's cultural heritage.

As one of only two police horse studs established in Queensland, and the only one with surviving structures, the Rewan Police Horse Breeding Station (former) is a rare example of a function that has always been uncommon.

The place has a special association with the life or work of a particular person, group or organisation of importance in Queensland's history.

Rewan Police Horse Breeding Station (former) has a special association with the Queensland Police Force, an important organisation in Queensland history since its establishment in 1863. The Queensland Police Force established the stud in 1909, built most of its structures, and conducted the stud for 25 years to breed, train and supply horses to the Queensland Police Force for police work throughout the state, at a time when horses were vital to policing.
