= Westgrove, Queensland =

Westgrove
- Suburb
- Interactive map of Westgrove
- Coordinates: 25.4366°S 148.4488°E
- Country: Australia
- State: Queensland
- LGA: Maranoa Region
- Location: 57 km (35 mi) N of Injune; 148 km (92 mi) N of Roma; 498 km (309 mi) NW of Toowoomba; 686 km (426 mi) NW of Brisbane

Government
  - State electorate: Warrego
  - Federal division: Maranoa

Area
  - Total: 453.3 km^{2} (175.0 sq mi)

Population
  - Total: 4 (2021 census)
  - Density: 0.0088/km^{2} (0.0229/sq mi)
- Time zone: UTC+10:00 (AEST)
- Postcode: 4454
Suburbs around Westgrove
Mount Howe	Carnarvon Park	Upper Dawson
Mount Howe	Westgrove	Upper Dawson
Womblebank	Hutton Creek	Baffle West

Westgrove is a rural locality in the Maranoa Region, Queensland, Australia. In the 2021 census, Westgrove had a population of 4 people.

== Geography ==
The Great Dividing Range bounds the locality to the west.

Sardine Creek rises in the north of the locality and flows south and then east, exiting the locality to Upper Dawson where it becomes a tributary of the Dawson River.

Most of the southern part of the locality is within the Forrest State Forest. Apart from this protected area, the surface land use is grazing on native vegetation.

There are gas fields belong the surface and gas is actively being extracted from within the locality.

== History ==
The locality takes its name from an early pastoral run in the district which appears on the 1870s Gregory's Map of Queensland.

Yellowbank Junction State School opened on 29 January 1991 and closed on 14 December 2001. It was probably associated with the development of the Yellowbank Gas Plant.

== Demographics ==
In the 2016 census, Westgrove had "no people or a very low population".

In the 2021 census, Westgrove had a population of 4 people.

== Education ==
There are no schools in Westgrove. The nearest government primary and secondary school is Injune State School (to Year 10) in Injune to the south. There are no nearby schools offering education to Year 12; the options are distance education and boarding school.
