= Kinnoul, Queensland =

Kinnoul
- Suburb
- Interactive map of Kinnoul
- Coordinates: 25.6625°S 149.5380°E
- Country: Australia
- State: Queensland
- LGA: Shire of Banana
- Location: 39.4 km (24.5 mi) SW of Taroom; 136 km (85 mi) NE of Roma; 236 km (147 mi) SW of Biloela; 475 km (295 mi) NW of Brisbane

Government
  - State electorate: Callide
  - Federal division: Flynn

Area
  - Total: 813.0 km^{2} (313.9 sq mi)

Population
  - Total: 80 (2021 census)
  - Density: 0.098/km^{2} (0.255/sq mi)
- Time zone: UTC+10:00 (AEST)
- Postcode: 4420
Suburbs around Kinnoul
Broadmere	Broadmere	Taroom
Baroondah	Kinnoul	Taroom
Eurombah	Eurombah	Taroom

Kinnoul is a rural locality in the Shire of Banana, Queensland, Australia. In the 2021 census, Kinnoul had a population of 80 people.

== Geography ==
The locality is bounded to the south in parts by the Dawson River. The western edge of the locality is mountainous with elevations up to 380 metres (1,250 ft) above sea level, falling to 190 metres (620 ft) towards the south and east of the locality. An exception to this is Mount Kinnoul in the south-east of the locality (25.6677°S 149.6691°E) which rises to 378 metres (1,240 ft).

Lynd Range (25.5760°S 149.3952°E) extends from neighbouring Broadmere to the north into Kinnoul.

The land use is predominantly grazing on native vegetation with some crop growing.

== History ==
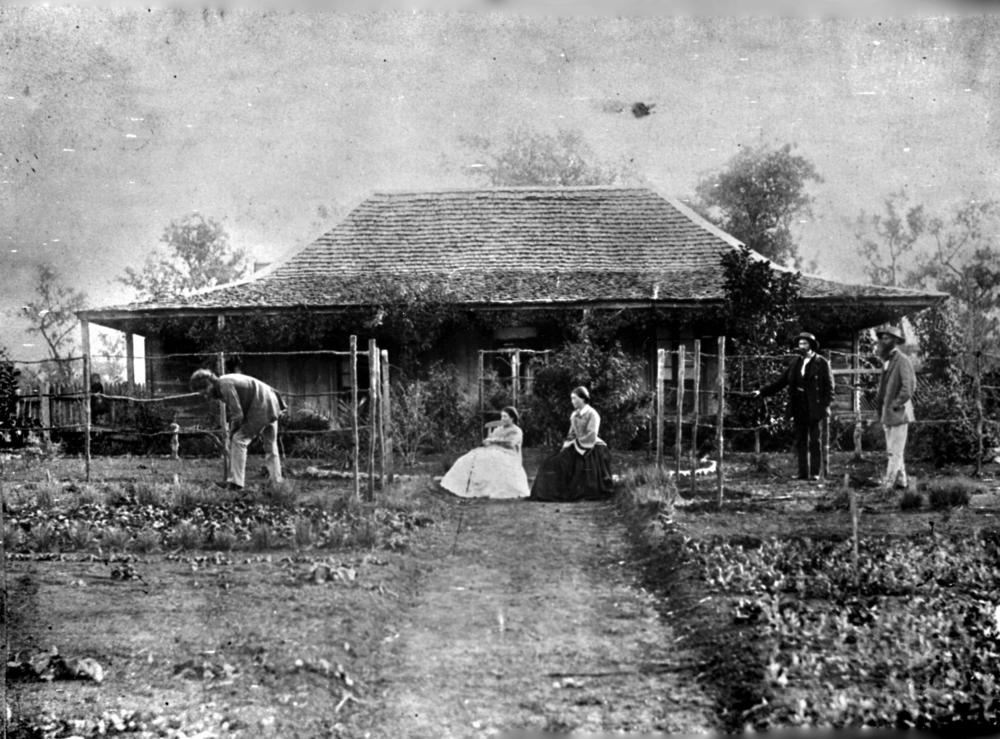
In the garden at Kinnoull Station, Dawson River, Queensland, 1864

The locality was officially named and bounded on 20 May 2005. However, the name has been in use since at least 1862 where it was part of a mail route from Taroom to Bungeworgorai. It probably takes its name from the Kinnoul pastoral lease taken out by Robert Miller and John Turnbull in 1851.

== Demographics ==
In the 2016 census, Kinnoul had a population of 69 people.

In the 2021 census, Kinnoul had a population of 80 people.

== Economy ==
There are a number of homesteads in the locality:

- Greenoaks (25.6288°S 149.6601°E)
- Kinfauns (25.5864°S 149.4886°E)
- Kinnoul (25.6754°S 149.6334°E)
- Wilga Park (25.6515°S 149.7334°E)

== Transport ==
Cowangah pastoral run has an airstrip (25.7348°S 149.4712°E).

Yurnga pastoral run has an airstrip (25.6587°S 149.3753°E).

== Education ==
There are no schools in Kinnoul. The nearest government school is Taroom State School in neighbouring Taroom to the east; it provides primary schooling and secondary schooling to Year 10. There are no nearby schools providing secondary schooling to Year 12. Distance education or boarding schools are the alternatives.
