= Simmie, Queensland =

Simmie
- Suburb
- Interactive map of Simmie
- Coordinates: 25.7302°S 148.6061°E
- Country: Australia
- State: Queensland
- LGA: Maranoa Region
- Location: 18.5 km (11.5 mi) NE of Injune; 109 km (68 mi) N of Roma; 459 km (285 mi) SW of Rockhampton; 460 km (290 mi) NW of Toowoomba; 647 km (402 mi) NW of Brisbane

Government
  - State electorate: Warrego
  - Federal division: Maranoa

Area
  - Total: 174.8 km^{2} (67.5 sq mi)

Population
  - Total: 16 (2021 census)
  - Density: 0.0915/km^{2} (0.237/sq mi)
- Time zone: UTC+10:00 (AEST)
- Postcode: 4454
Suburbs around Simmie
Hutton Creek	Baffle West	Baffle West
Hutton Creek	Simmie	Beilba
Injune	Injune	Highland Plains

Simmie is a rural locality in the Maranoa Region, Queensland, Australia. In the 2021 census, Simmie had a population of 16 people.

== Geography ==
The Carnarvon Highway runs through the locality from north (Baffle West) to south (Injune).

Hutton Creek (the watercourse) enters the locality from the west (Hutton Creek, the locality) and flows south-east through the locality, forming part of the south-eastern boundary of the locality, before becoming a tributary of Injune Creek.

The land use is grazing on native vegetation.

== History ==
The locality takes its name from the parish, which in turn was likely named after pastoralist George Simmie, one of the lessees of Injune pastoral run in 1866.

== Demographics ==
In the 2016 census, Simmie had a population of 8 people.

In the 2021 census, Simmie had a population of 16 people.

== Economy ==
There are a number of homesteads in the locality:

- East Lynne (25.7334°S 148.5763°E)
- Simmie (25.7400°S 148.5737°E)
- Warndoo (25.7527°S 148.6838°E)

== Education ==
There are no schools in Simmie. The nearest government primary and secondary school (to Year 10) is Injune State School in neighbouring Injune to the south. There are no nearby schools providing secondary education to Year 12; the options are distance education and boarding school.
