= Mount Howe, Queensland =

Mount Howe
- Suburb
- Interactive map of Mount Howe
- Coordinates: 25.2863°S 148.2230°E
- Country: Australia
- State: Queensland
- LGA: Maranoa Region
- Location: 99.4 km (61.8 mi) NNW of Injune; 185 km (115 mi) NNW of Roma; 536 km (333 mi) NW of Toowoomba; 663 km (412 mi) NW of Brisbane

Government
  - State electorate: Warrego
  - Federal division: Maranoa

Area
  - Total: 1,019.9 km^{2} (393.8 sq mi)
- Elevation: 480–1,110 m (1,570–3,640 ft)

Population
  - Total: 20 (2021 census)
  - Density: 0.020/km^{2} (0.051/sq mi)
- Time zone: UTC+10:00 (AEST)
- Postcode: 4454
Suburbs around Mount Howe
Mount Moffatt	Carnarvon Park	Carnarvon Park
Mount Moffatt	Mount Howe	Westgrove
Womblebank	Womblebank	Westgrove

Mount Howe is a rural locality in the Maranoa Region, Queensland, Australia. In the 2021 census, Mount Howe had a population of 20 people.

== Geography ==
The Great Dividing Range forms the north-east, east and south-east boundaries of the locality. The locality is within the Murray-Darling drainage basin, specifically within the catchment of the Balonne-Condamine Rivers. The terrain is mountainous with elevations ranging from 480 to 1,110 metres (1,570 to 3,640 ft) above sea level.

The locality has the following mountains:

- Mount Eden (25.1208°S 148.1011°E) 854 metres (2,802 ft)
- Mount Hetty (25.1874°S 148.2925°E) 1,041 metres (3,415 ft)
- Mount Ramsay (25.1192°S 148.2412°E)
- Mount Springvale (25.2458°S 148.2780°E) 845 metres (2,772 ft)
- Snake Hill (25.1353°S 148.2421°E) 1,002 metres (3,287 ft)

There are three areas within the Eden State Forest in the centre of the locality (25.2576°S 148.2245°E). Apart from these, the land use is grazing on native vegetation.

== Demographics ==
In the 2016 census, Mount Howe had "no people or a very low population".

In the 2021 census, Mount Howe had a population of 20 people.

== Economy ==
There are a number of homesteads in the locality:

- Calline Creek (25.2562°S 148.1921°E)
- Coonong (25.2889°S 148.2503°E)
- East Sunrise (25.2954°S 148.1069°E)
- Edenvale (25.1402°S 148.1247°E)
- Glendonnell (25.3967°S 148.2036°E)
- Glenolive (25.2447°S 148.2018°E)
- Lying Downs (25.2301°S 148.2032°E)
- Mount Hetty (25.1928°S 148.1603°E)
- Myrtleville (25.3984°S 148.2598°E)
- Saddler Springs (25.1309°S 148.1311°E)
- Springvale (25.3223°S 148.3209°E)
- Sunrise (25.3325°S 148.0977°E)

== Transport ==
Some of the homesteads have airstrips:

- Myrtleville airstrip (25.3927°S 148.2608°E)
- Calline Creek airstrip (25.2532°S 148.1904°E)

== Education ==
There are no schools in Mount Howe nor nearby. Distance education and boarding schools are the alternatives.
