= Upper Warrego =

- Suburb
- Interactive map of Upper Warrego
- Coordinates: 25.1494°S 147.3291°E
- Country: Australia
- State: Queensland
- LGA: Shire of Murweh
- Location: 182 km (113 mi) NE of Augathella; 264 km (164 mi) NE of Charleville; 285 km (177 mi) NNW of Roma; 819 km (509 mi) NW of Brisbane

Government
  - State electorate: Warrego
  - Federal division: Division of Maranoa

Area
  - Total: 4,963.5 km^{2} (1,916.4 sq mi)
- Elevation: 420–1,125 m (1,378–3,691 ft)

Population
  - Total: 38 (2021 census)
  - Density: 0.00766/km^{2} (0.01983/sq mi)
- Time zone: UTC+10:00 (AEST)
- Postcode: 4477
Suburbs around Upper Warrego
Carnarvon Park	Carnarvon Park	Carnarvon Park
Caldervale	Upper Warrego	Mount Moffatt
Nive	Caroline Crossing	Womblebank

Upper Warrego is a rural locality in the Shire of Murweh, Queensland, Australia. In the 2021 census, Upper Warrego had a population of 38 people.

== Geography ==
The Great Dividing Range forms part of the north-western, northern, and north-eastern boundaries of the locality.

The Warrego River rises in the north-east of the locality and meanders south-west, exiting to the south (Caroline Crossing). The locality name reflects that the upper reaches of the river are within the locality. Due to the Great Dividing Range, the Warrego River is the northernmost river within the Murray Darling drainage basin. Consistent with this, the elevations range from 1,125 metres (3,691 ft) in the north-east of the locality through to 420 metres (1,380 ft) in the south-west of the locality, with the following mountains in the north-eastern part of the locality (from north to south):

- Mount Lambert (24.7925°S 147.7485°E), rising to 1,029 metres (3,376 ft) above sea level
- Mount Lyon (24.8468°S 147.7950°E) 1,059 metres (3,474 ft)
- Junction Hill (24.8802°S 147.9431°E) 1,125 metres (3,691 ft)
- Mount Sugarloaf (24.8928°S 147.9492°E) 1,154 metres (3,786 ft)
- Mount Emily (24.9879°S 147.6831°E) 779 metres (2,556 ft)
- Bally Lethbridge (25.0134°S 147.6073°E) 806 metres (2,644 ft)
- Mount Hopeless (25.0529°S 147.3637°E) 828 metres (2,717 ft)
- Mount King (25.1461°S 147.5368°E) 746 metres (2,448 ft)
- Mount Drummond (25.1564°S 147.4192°E) 859 metres (2,818 ft)
- Mount Yanalah (25.1632°S 147.4302°E) 810 metres (2,660 ft)
- Mount Black (25.1783°S 147.4560°E) 831 metres (2,726 ft)
- Mount Grassy (25.1991°S 147.4706°E) 801 metres (2,628 ft)
- Mount Tabor (25.2002°S 147.5559°E) 813 metres (2,667 ft)
- Bullock Mountain (25.2446°S 147.4292°E) 776 metres (2,546 ft)

The Landsborough Highway passes to the west of the locality; there is limited road infrastructure within the locality.

There are small parts of the Carnarvon National Park in the north-east of the locality, extending into the neighbouring localities of Carnavon Park to the north and Mount Moffatt to the east. Other protected areas within the south-west of locality include:

- Pluto Timber Reserve, which extends into neighbouring Caldervale to the west
- Attica State Forest, which extends into neighbouring Mount Moffat to the east
- Cunno State Forest (two sections)

Apart from the protected areas, the land use is predominantly grazing on native vegetation.

== History ==
The locality takes its name from the Warrego River, where Warrego is the Aboriginal name for the river, according to notes made on 11 September 1846 by Thomas Mitchell, the Surveyor-General of New South Wales.

== Demographics ==
In the 2016 census, Upper Warrego had "no people or a very low population".

In the 2021 census, Upper Warrego had a population of 38 people.

== Education ==
There are no schools in Upper Warrego. Students living in the far south-west of the locality could attend primary school at Augathella State School in Augathella to the south-west, but this school would be too distant from most parts of the locality. Also, there are no secondary schools nearby. The alternatives are distance education and boarding school.
