= Carnarvon Park, Queensland =

Carnarvon Park
- Suburb
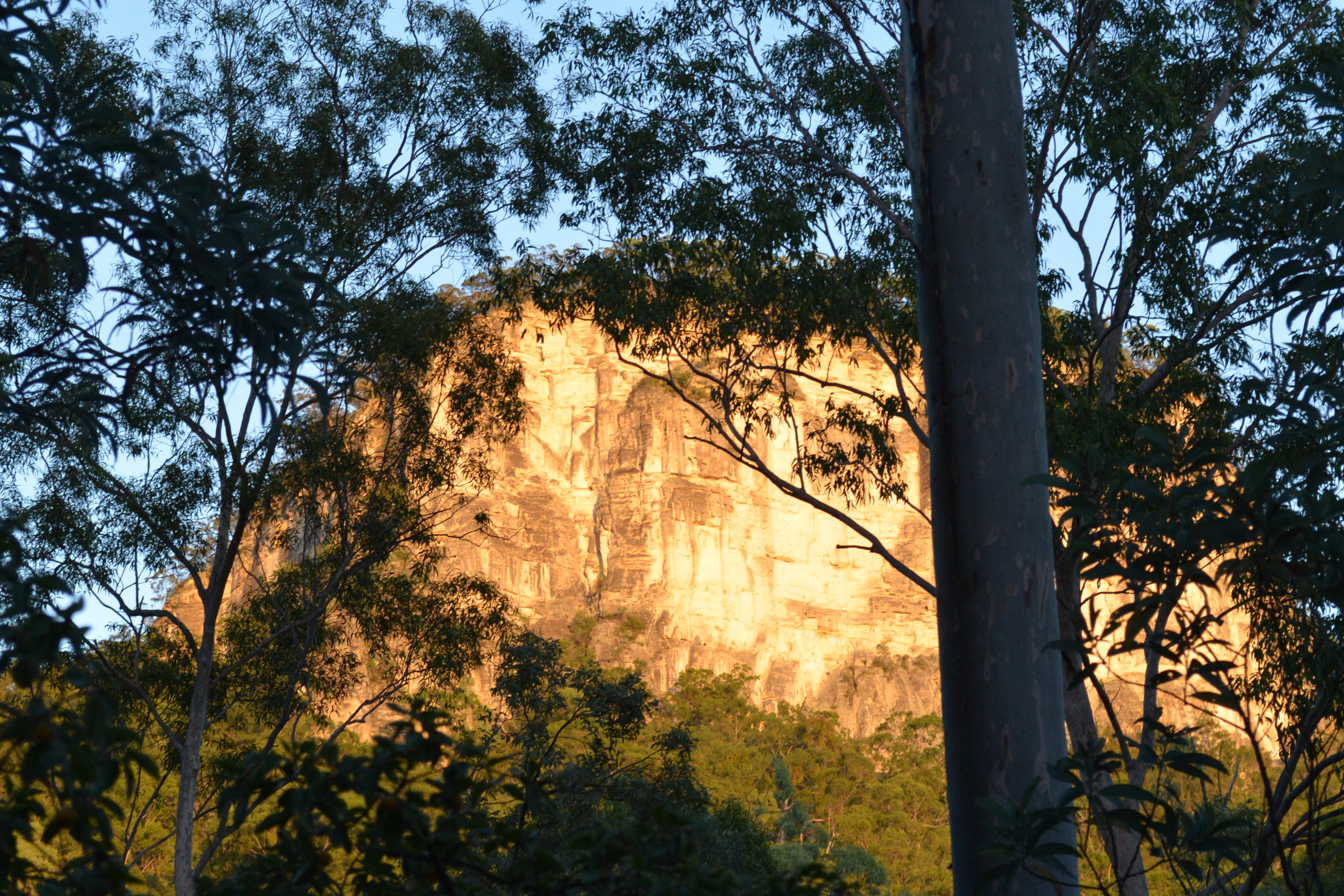
- Carnarvon National Park within Carnarvon Park, 2018

- Interactive map of Carnarvon Park
- Coordinates: 24.7183°S 147.8733°E
- Country: Australia
- State: Queensland
- LGA: Central Highlands Region
- Location: 90.8 km (56.4 mi) SSW of Springsure; 159 km (99 mi) SSW of Emerald; 426 km (265 mi) SW of Rockhampton; 841 km (523 mi) NW of Brisbane

Government
  - State electorate: Gregory
  - Federal division: Flynn

Area
  - Total: 2,395.7 km^{2} (925.0 sq mi)

Population
  - Total: 12 (2021 census)
  - Density: 0.00501/km^{2} (0.0130/sq mi)
- Time zone: UTC+10:00 (AEST)
- Postcode: 4702

Carnarvon Park is a rural locality in the Central Highlands Region, Queensland, Australia. In the 2021 census, Carnarvon Park had a population of 12 people.

== Geography ==
Carnarvon Park consists of two separate areas of land, separated by 2 kilometres (1.2 mi) of land which is part of Mount Moffatt and Rewan.

=== North-western section ===
Carnarvon Park (NW)
- Suburb
- Country: Australia
- State: Queensland

Population
  - Total: 12
Suburbs around Carnarvon Park (NW)
Mantuan Downs	Buckland	Wealwandangie
Caldervale	Carnarvon Park (NW)	Consuelo
Caldervale	Upper Warrego	Mount Moffatt; Rewan

The Great Dividing Range forms all of the western boundary most of the southern boundary of this section.

The Nogoa River rises in neighbouring Caldervale to the south-west, entering from section from the south-west and exiting to the north (Buckland).

The north-western section is entirely within the Carnarvon National Park, extending into the neighbouring localities of Upper Warrego and Mount Moffatt.

The north-western section has the following mountains and passes (from west to east):

- Spyglass Peak (24.8163°S 147.1977°E) 548 metres (1,798 ft)
- Mount Salvator (24.8509°S 147.2146°E) 614 metres (2,014 ft)
- Mount Flat Top (24.8701°S 147.3378°E) 755 metres (2,477 ft)
- Fred Hill (24.8281°S 147.3446°E) 705 metres (2,313 ft)
- Cave Hill (24.8495°S 147.3815°E) 731 metres (2,398 ft)
- Mount Mooloolong (24.8430°S 147.3921°E) 767 metres (2,516 ft)
- Red Hill (24.8321°S 147.4488°E) 750 metres (2,460 ft)
- Mount Ka Ka Mundi (24.7996°S 147.4934°E) 890 metres (2,920 ft)
- Mount Cheops (24.5285°S 147.9587°E) 715 metres (2,346 ft)
- Mount Lethbridge (24.8720°S 147.9786°E) 1,040 metres (3,410 ft)
- Kelmans Gap (24.8957°S 147.9901°E)
- Round Mountain (24.8223°S 147.9902°E) 1,051 metres (3,448 ft)
- Ben Cona (24.5524°S 148.0647°E) 703 metres (2,306 ft)

=== South-eastern section ===
Carnarvon Park (SE)
- Suburb
- Country: Australia
- State: Queensland

Population
  - Total: 12
Suburbs around Carnarvon Park (SE)
Mount Moffatt	Rewan	Rewan
Mount Howe	Carnarvon Park (SE)	Arcadia Valley
Mount Howe	Westgrover; Upper Dawson	Arcadia Valley

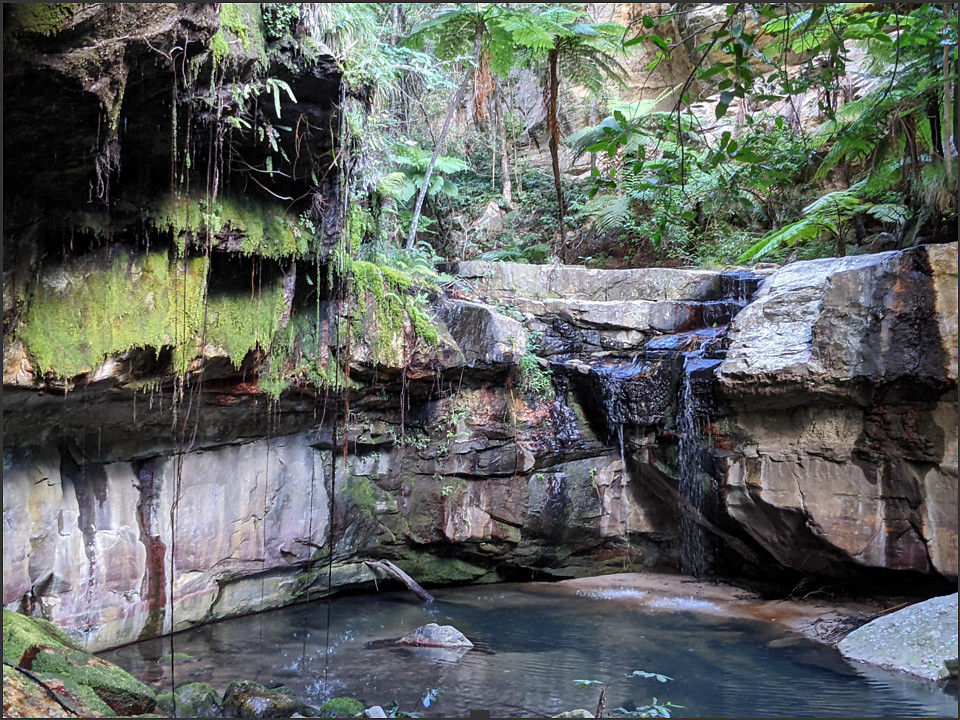
Moss Garden, south-eastern section, 2022

The Great Dividing Range forms all of the north-western, western, and south-western boundary of this section.

Almost all of the south-eastern section is within the Carnarvon National Park except for a small area within the Boxvale State Forest in the most south-easterly part of the section. This national park also extends partially into the neighbouring locality of Mount Moffatt.

The south-eastern section has the following mountains and canyons (from west to east):

- Mount Percy (25.0131°S 148.0937°E) 1,151 metres (3,776 ft)
- Carnarvon Gorge (25.0467°S 148.1997°E)
- Wards Canyon (Angiopteris Ravine) (25.0436°S 148.2035°E)
- Consuelo Peak (24.9428°S 148.2080°E) 1,174 metres (3,852 ft)
- Mount Acland (Black Alley Peak) (24.9650°S 148.2380°E) 966 metres (3,169 ft)
- Mount Hodgson (25.1287°S 148.2528°E) 986 metres (3,235 ft)

== History ==
In 1932, a section of the Carnarvon Gorge was declared as Carnarvon National Park, a proposal from the Royal Geographical Society of Queensland.

== Demographics ==
In the 2016 census, Carnarvon Park had "no people or a very low population".

In the 2021 census, Carnarvon Park had a population of 12 people.

== Education ==
There are no schools in Carnarvon Park. The nearest government primary school is Arcadia Valley State School in Arcadia Valley, a neighbouring locality to the south-east of south-eastern section, but it would be too distant from most of the two sections for a daily commute. There are no nearby secondary schools. The alternatives are distance education and boarding school.
