= Caroline Crossing, Queensland =

Caroline Crossing
- Suburb
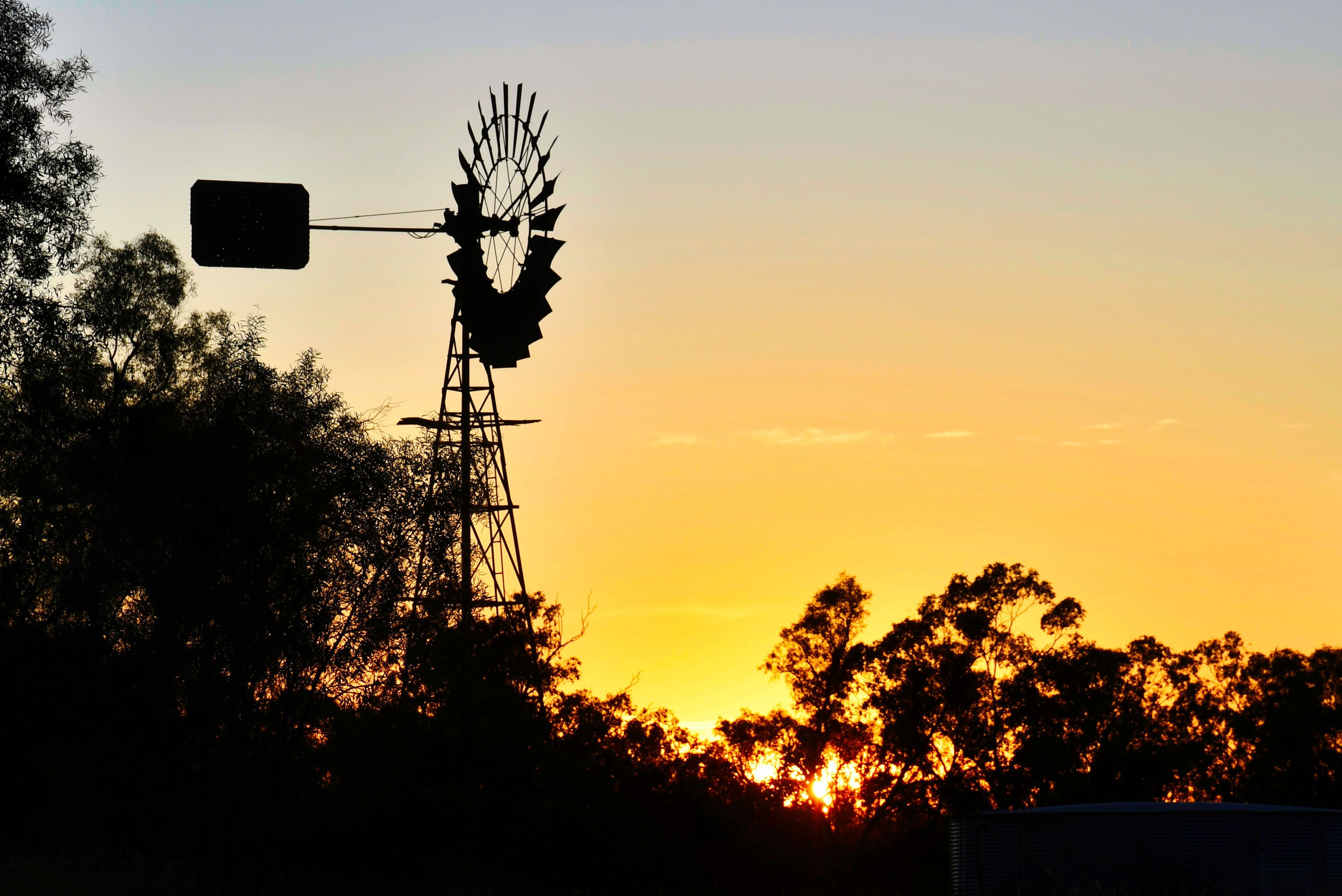
- Caroline Crossing Road, 2022

- Interactive map of Caroline Crossing
- Coordinates: 25.6764°S 146.9861°E
- Country: Australia
- State: Queensland
- LGA: Shire of Murweh
- Location: 64.2 km (39.9 mi) ENE of Augathella; 147 km (91 mi) NE of Charleville; 275 km (171 mi) NW of Roma; 625 km (388 mi) WNW of Toowoomba; 752 km (467 mi) WNW of Brisbane

Government
  - State electorate: Warrego
  - Federal division: Maranoa

Area
  - Total: 2,003.1 km^{2} (773.4 sq mi)

Population
  - Total: 44 (2021 census)
  - Density: 0.02197/km^{2} (0.0569/sq mi)
- Time zone: UTC+10:00 (AEST)
- Postcode: 4477
Suburbs around Caroline Crossing
Upper Warrego	Upper Warrego	Upper Warrego
Nive	Caroline Crossing	Womblebank
Augathella	Clara Creek	Redford

Caroline Crossing is a rural locality in the Shire of Murweh, Queensland, Australia. In the 2021 census, Caroline Crossing had a population of 44 people.

== Geography ==
The Landsborough Highway forms a small part of the south-western boundary of the locality.

The land use is grazing on native vegetation.

== History ==
The locality was named and bounded on 28 March 2002. It is presumably named after the ford across the Warrego River known as Caroline Crossing (25.6166°S 146.75°E).

== Demographics ==
In the 2016 census, Caroline Crossing had a population of 13 people.

In the 2021 census, Caroline Crossing had a population of 44 people.

== Education ==
There are no schools in Caroline Crossing. The nearest government primary school is Augathella State School in neighbouring Augathella to the south-west. However, students in some parts of Caroline Crossing would be too distant for a daily commute. There are no secondary schools nearby. The alternatives are distance education and boarding school.
