= Lake Nuga Nuga =

Lake in Australia

- Location within Queensland
- Location: 60km South of Rolleston, Queensland
- Coordinates: 24.995°S 148.679°E
- Type: natural
- Basin countries: Australia

Lake Nuga Nuga is a natural water body at Arcadia Valley in the Central Highlands Region, Queensland, Australia. It is within the Central Queensland Sandstone Belt and adjacent to the Nuga Nuga National Park. It provides a habitat for waterbirds in an otherwise arid landscape.

Lake Nuga Nuga is the largest natural water body in the entire Central Queensland Sandstone Belt. The lake sometimes dries up completely. But when there is water in it, Lake Nuga Nuga is a great spectacle. Water lily carpet the lake and in the vicinity groves of the endangered bonewood, Macropteranthes leichhardtii, grow.

== Activities ==
Lake Nuga Nuga is ideal for nature lovers as it offers opportunities for photography, bushwalking and canoeing. Over 150 species of birds inhabit the area in its vicinity, which is part of the larger Nuga Nuga National Park. Fishing is permitted in the lake.

== See also ==
- List of lakes of Australia
