= Pony Hills, Queensland =

Pony Hills
- Suburb
- Interactive map of Pony Hills
- Coordinates: 25.8897°S 148.9616°E
- Country: Australia
- State: Queensland
- LGA: Maranoa Region
- Location: 59.3 km (36.8 mi) E of Injune; 121 km (75 mi) NNE of Roma; 424 km (263 mi) NW of Toowoomba; 552 km (343 mi) NW of Brisbane

Government
  - State electorate: Warrego
  - Federal divisions: Maranoa; Flynn

Area
  - Total: 417.0 km^{2} (161.0 sq mi)

Population
  - Total: 0 (2021 census)
  - Density: 0.0000/km^{2} (0.0000/sq mi)
- Time zone: UTC+10:00 (AEST)
- Postcode: 4454
Suburbs around Pony Hills
Beilba	Beilba	Baroondah
Highland Plains	Pony Hills	Baroondah
Eumamurrin	Durham Downs	Durham Downs

Pony Hills is a rural locality in the Maranoa Region, Queensland, Australia. In the 2021 census, Pony Hills had "no people or a very low population".

== Geography ==
Hallett State Forest is in the north of the locality extending into neighbouring Beilba to the north and neighbouring Baroondah to the north-east. Apart from this protected area, the land use is grazing on native vegetation.

== Demographics ==
In the 2016 census, Pony Hills had a population of 11 people.

In the 2021 census, Pony Hills had "no people or a very low population".

== Education ==
There are no schools in Pony Hills. The nearest government primary schools are Injune State School in Injune to the west and Bymount East State School in Bymount to the south-west. The nearest government secondary school is Injune State School (to Year 10). However, some parts of Pony Hills are too distant to attend either of these schools. Also, there are no nearby schools providing education to Year 12. The alternatives are distance education and boarding school.
