= Womblebank, Queensland =

Womblebank
- Suburb
- Interactive map of Womblebank
- Coordinates: 25.5363°S 147.8180°E
- Country: Australia
- State: Queensland
- LGA: Maranoa Region
- Location: 152 km (94 mi) WNW of Injune; 221 km (137 mi) NW of Roma; 571 km (355 mi) NW of Toowoomba; 746 km (464 mi) WNW of Brisbane

Government
  - State electorate: Warrego
  - Federal division: Maranoa

Area
  - Total: 4,362.1 km^{2} (1,684.2 sq mi)

Population
  - Total: 40 (2021 census)
  - Density: 0.0092/km^{2} (0.0237/sq mi)
- Time zone: UTC+10:00 (AEST)
- Postcode: 4465
Suburbs around Womblebank
Upper Warrego	Mount Moffatt	Mount Howe; Westgrove
Caroline Crossing	Womblebank	Hutton Creek
Redford	Forestvale	Kilmorey Falls; Mount Hutton

Womblebank is a rural locality in the Maranoa Region, Queensland, Australia. In the 2021 census, Womblebank had a population of 40 people.

Womblebank's postcode is 4465.

== Geography ==
The Great Dividing Range loosely bounds the locality to the east. The Maranoa River enters the locality from the north (Mount Moffatt) and flows south through the locality, exiting to the south (Forestvale); it later becomes a tributary of the Balonne River and is part of the Murray Darling drainage basin.

Womblebank has the following mountains in the north of the locality:

- Mount Owen (25.3675°S 147.5975°E), rising to 833 metres (2,733 ft) above sea level
- Bendee Mountain (25.4435°S 147.7208°E) 605 metres (1,985 ft)

There are a number of state forests in the locality (from west to east):

- Koolbellup State Forest in the west of the locality
- Hillside State Forest in the centre west of the locality
- Oakvale State Forest in the centre east of the locality
- two sections of Howe State Forest in the east of the locality

Apart from these protected areas, the land use is grazing on native vegetation.

== Demographics ==
In the 2016 census, Womblebank had a population of 16 people.

In the 2021 census, Womblebank had a population of 40 people.

== Education ==
There are no schools in Womblebank. The nearest government school is Injune State School (Prep to Year 10) in Injune to the east. However, it would be too distant for students in all but the eastern parts of Womblebank. Also, there are no nearby schools offering education to Year 12. The alternatives are distance education and boarding school.
