= Rewan, Queensland =

Rewan
- Suburb
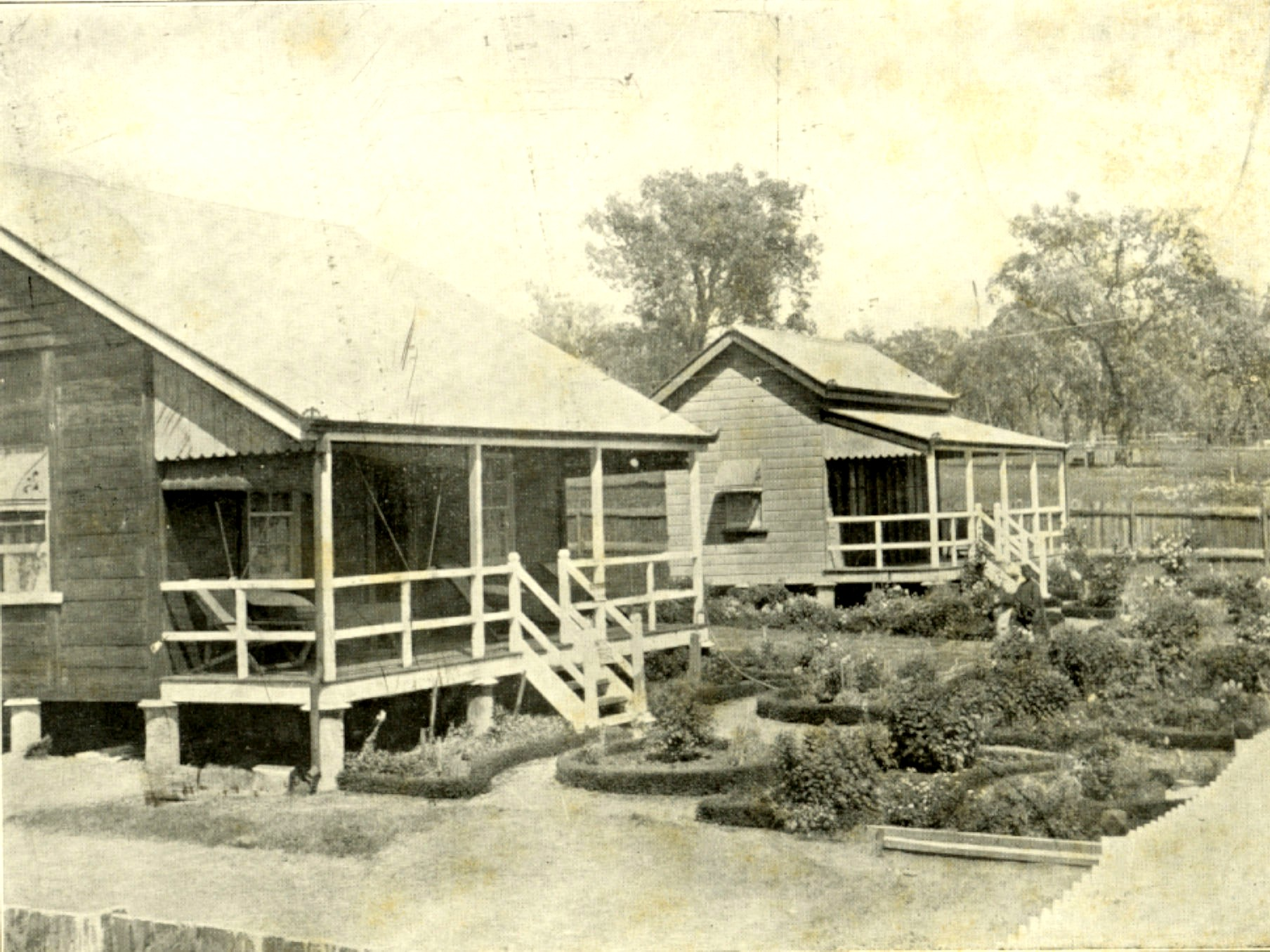
- Rewan station buildings and garden, 1910

- Interactive map of Rewan
- Coordinates: 24.9675°S 148.3855°E
- Country: Australia
- State: Queensland
- LGA: Central Highlands Region
- Location: 61.8 km (38.4 mi) S of Rolleston; 200 km (120 mi) S of Emerald; 360 km (220 mi) SW of Rockhampton; 682 km (424 mi) NW of Brisbane

Government
  - State electorate: Gregory
  - Federal division: Flynn

Area
  - Total: 2,068.5 km^{2} (798.7 sq mi)

Population
  - Total: 49 (2021 census)
  - Density: 0.02369/km^{2} (0.0614/sq mi)
- Time zone: UTC+10:00 (AEST)
- Postcode: 4702
Suburbs around Rewan
| Consuelo | Consuelo | Arcadia Valley |
| Mount Moffatt | Rewan | Arcadia Valley |
| Carnarvon Park | Carnarvon Park | Arcadia Valley |

Rewan is a rural locality in the Central Highlands Region, Queensland, Australia. In the 2021 census, Rewan had a population of 49 people.

== Geography ==
The Carnarvon Highway enters the locality from the north (Consuelo), then runs south through the locality, exiting to the south (Carnarvon Park).

The terrain is mountainous with many named peaks (from north to south):

- Mount Inglis (24.7501°S 148.2778°E) 766 metres (2,513 ft)
- Mount Hades (24.7805°S 148.1020°E) 1,000 metres (3,300 ft)
- Mount Flank (24.8014°S 148.3349°E) 647 metres (2,123 ft)
- Mount Serocold (24.8366°S 148.2790°E) 900 metres (3,000 ft)
- Mount Hornet (24.8660°S 148.2769°E) 925 metres (3,035 ft)
- Mount Carnarvon (24.9136°S 148.3791°E) 631 metres (2,070 ft)
- Mount Kirk (24.9602°S 148.6955°E) 472 metres (1,549 ft)
- Mount Warrinilla (24.9837°S 148.6730°E) 440 metres (1,440 ft)
- The Crater (25.0548°S 148.4098°E)
- Mount Round (25.0658°S 148.4151°E) 462 metres (1,516 ft)

Nuga Nuga National Park is in the east of the locality. One part of Serocold State Forest is in the north of the locality while two other parts are in the south of the locality, along with Bandana State Forest. Apart from these protected areas, the land use is grazing on native vegetation.

== History ==
All 19 people aboard a Dakota C-47 aircraft were killed when it crashed at Rewan on 16 November 1943 during World War II. Those killed consisted of 14 military personnel from the Australian Army and the Royal Australian Air Force along with five personnel from the United States Army Air Corp. A memorial was erected near the crash site in 2004.

== Demographics ==
In the 2016 census, Rewan had a population of 22 people.

In the 2021 census, Rewan had a population of 49 people.

== Heritage listings ==
Heritage-listed sites in Rewan include:

- Rewan Police Horse Breeding Station, Rewan Road (24.9574°S 148.3740°E)

== Education ==
There are no schools in Rewan. The nearest government primary school is Rolleston State School in Rolleston to the north, but it would only be accessible for a daily commute from the north of Rewan. There are no nearby secondary schools. The alternatives are distance education and boarding school.

== See also ==
- Rewan air crash
