= Boggomoss =

In the Taroom district in the Dawson River valley of Queensland, Australia, a boggomoss (pl. boggomossi or boggomosses) is a mound spring. Boggomosses range in form from small muddy swamps to elevated peat bogs or swamps, up to 150 meters across scattered among dry woodland communities, which form part of the Springsure Group of Great Artesian Basin springs. They are rich in invertebrates and form a vital chain of permanently moist oases in an otherwise dry environment.

The origin of the term boggomoss is not known, but is most likely a compound of the words bog and moss. "Boggomoss creek" in the Parish of Fernyside appears on very early maps.

== Environment ==
The spring flow rate is usually in the range of 0.5 to 2.0 litres per second (8th magnitude spring), however some large boggomosses have a flow rate of up to 10.0 litres per second (7th magnitude spring). A report commissioned by the Queensland Department of Environment defined four boggomoss vegetation types with distinct environmental relations:

- Group 1 associated with sandy and relatively infertile soils.
- Group 2 associated with fertile and heavy surface soils and relatively large mounds.
- Group 3 associated with fertile and heavy surface soils, but with little or no mound development (probably young springs).
- Group 4 are linear in shape and flood prone at the base of a gorge
