= Broadmere, Queensland =

Broadmere
- Suburb
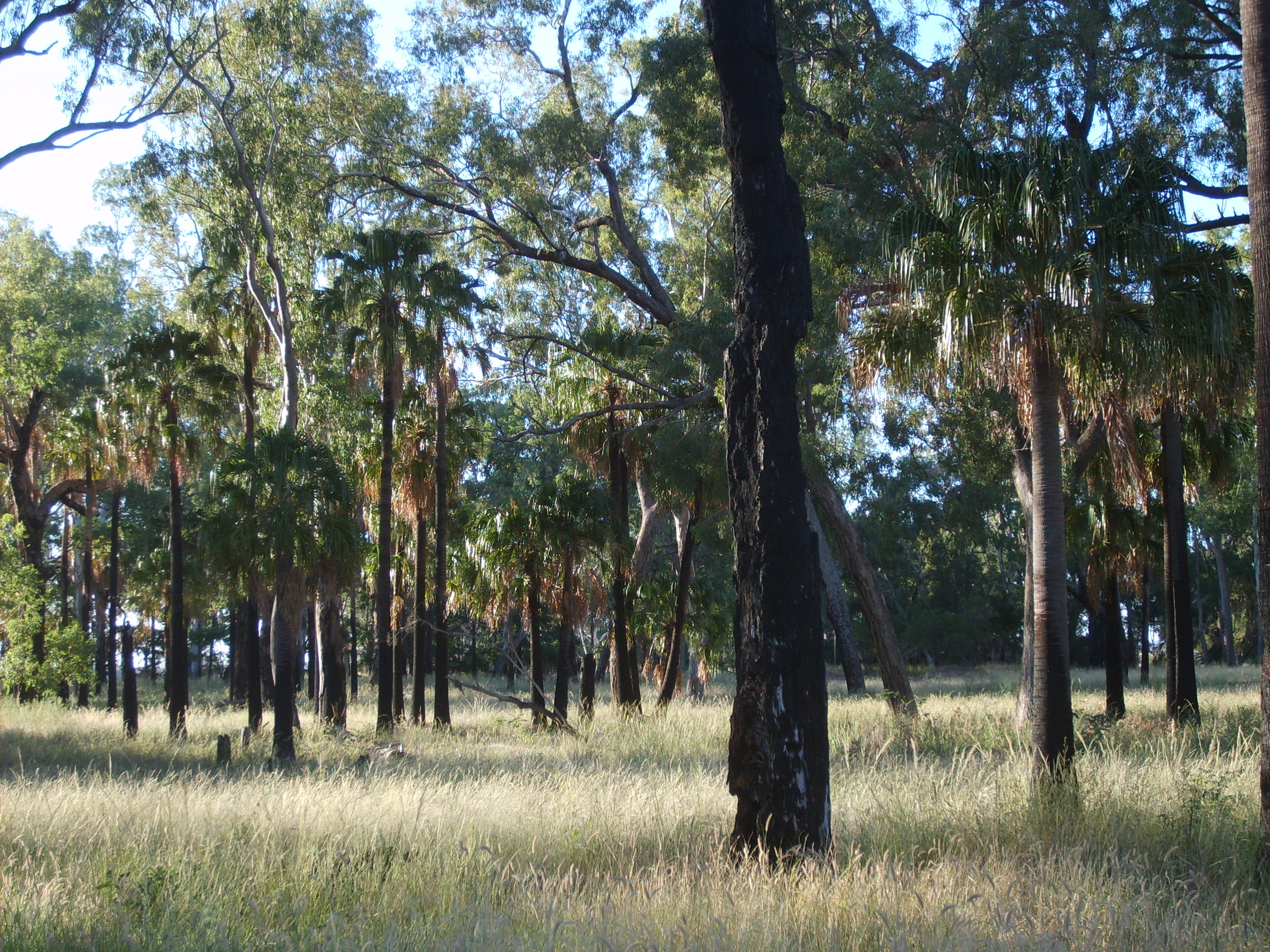
- Dawson palms at Lake Murphy Conservation Park, 2007

- Interactive map of Broadmere
- Coordinates: 25.4977°S 149.555°E
- Country: Australia
- State: Queensland
- LGA: Shire of Banana
- Location: 36.1 km (22.4 mi) NW of Taroom; 216 km (134 mi) SW of Biloela; 319 km (198 mi) SSW of Rockhampton; 501 km (311 mi) NW of Brisbane

Government
  - State electorate: Callide
  - Federal division: Flynn

Area
  - Total: 578.9 km^{2} (223.5 sq mi)

Population
  - Total: 38 (2021 census)
  - Density: 0.0656/km^{2} (0.1700/sq mi)
- Time zone: UTC+10:00 (AEST)
- Postcode: 4420
Suburbs around Broadmere
Glenhaughton	Gwambegwine	Gwambegwine
Baroondah	Broadmere	Taroom
Kinnoul	Kinnoul	Kinnoul

Broadmere is a rural locality in the Shire of Banana, Queensland, Australia. In the 2021 census, Broadmere had a population of 38 people.

== Geography ==
The Murphy Range forms part of the northern boundary of the locality while the Lynd Range forms part of the southern boundary.

The Leichhardt Highway passes to the south-east of the locality, while the Taroom Bauhinia Downs Road (State Route 7) passes to the north-east.

The Lake Murphy Conservation Park is in the east of the locality and the Belington Hut State Forest is in the west of the locality. Apart from these protected areas, the land use is predominantly grazing on native vegetation with a small amount of crop growing, mostly near Robinson Creek immediately south-east of the conservation park.

== Demographics ==
In the 2016 census, Broadmere had a population of 44 people.

In the 2021 census, Broadmere had a population of 38 people.

== Education ==
There are no schools in Broadmere. The nearest government primary and secondary school (Prep - Year 10) is Taroom State School in neighbouring Taroom to the east. However, for students living in the far west of Broadmere, the distances involved may be too far for a daily commute. There are no nearby schools providing schooling to Year 12. The alternatives are distance education and boarding school.
