= Arcadia Valley, Queensland =

Arcadia Valley
- Suburb
- Interactive map of Arcadia Valley
- Coordinates: 25.0152°S 148.7955°E
- Country: Australia
- State: Queensland
- LGA: Central Highlands Region
- Location: 98.1 km (61.0 mi) NE of Injune; 185 km (115 mi) SSE of Springsure; 244 km (152 mi) S of Emerald; 344 km (214 mi) SW of Rockhampton; 667 km (414 mi) NW of Brisbane

Government
  - State electorate: Gregory
  - Federal division: Flynn

Area
  - Total: 2,117.8 km^{2} (817.7 sq mi)

Population
  - Total: 141 (2021 census)
  - Density: 0.06658/km^{2} (0.1724/sq mi)
- Time zone: UTC+10:00 (AEST)
- Postcode: 4454
Suburbs around Arcadia Valley
Consuelo	Coorumbene; Humboldt	Dromedary
Rewan; Carnarvon Park	Arcadia Valley	Mungabunda; Glenhaughton
Upper Dawson	Beilba	Baroondah

Arcadia Valley is a rural locality in the Central Highlands Region, Queensland, Australia. In the 2021 census, Arcadia Valley had a population of 141 people.

== Geography ==
Arcadia Valley has the following mountains:

- Calf (25.4545°S 148.9225°E)
- Castle Hill (25.3368°S 148.9041°E) 765 metres (2,510 ft)
- Castle Rock (25.3687°S 148.7500°E)
- Cow and (25.4498°S 148.9226°E)
- Mount Wadja (25.4645°S 148.8745°E) 580 metres (1,900 ft)
- Pyramid Hill (25.4579°S 148.8760°E) 622 metres (2,041 ft)
- Sphinx (25.3871°S 148.9328°E) 705 metres (2,313 ft)

== History ==
It is believed that squatters in the 1850s named the area Arcadia meaning quiet rural simplicity.

Arcadia Valley State School opened on 3 March 1975.

Arcadia Valley was within the Shire of Bauhinia until 2008, when that shire was amalgamated into the Central Highlands Region.

== Demographics ==
In the 2011 census, the population of Arcadia Valley was too low to be separately reported and was included within neighbouring Rewan, which had a reported population of 465 people.

In the 2016 census, Arcadia Valley had a population of 102 people.

In the 2021 census, Arcadia Valley had a population of 141 people.

== Economy ==
The tradition mainstay of the local economy is beef production with cattle farms being the predominant land use. However, from 2013 Santos have been purchasing land and planning infrastructure for liquid natural gas extraction in the area with a pipeline to Gladstone.

There are a number of homesteads in the locality:

- Alambee (24.8713°S 148.7689°E)
- Arcadia (25.2087°S 148.6719°E)
- Austral Park (25.0905°S 148.7693°E)
- Basalt Creek (24.6317°S 148.8716°E)
- Bila Belong (25.1418°S 148.6190°E)
- Bundaleer (25.2442°S 148.8080°E)
- Bylot Plains (25.1639°S 148.7919°E)
- Castle Hill (25.3538°S 148.8425°E)
- Clematis (24.7842°S 148.7758°E)
- Comet Side (24.7308°S 148.7602°E)
- Glenidal (24.8794°S 148.8267°E)
- Harding Dale (25.2274°S 148.8208°E)
- Harrow (25.0275°S 148.7586°E)
- Hilly Vale (25.4264°S 148.8364°E)
- Kiamanna (25.4050°S 148.8585°E)
- Leeora Downs (25.0551°S 148.7566°E)
- Linga Longa (25.3636°S 148.8304°E)
- Marjundale (25.1349°S 148.7952°E)
- Mount Kingsley (25.2792°S 148.8524°E)
- Purbrook (24.8150°S 148.7607°E)
- Red Rock (25.1925°S 148.6483°E)
- Sunnyholt (25.3045°S 148.8680°E)
- Tarcoola (25.4532°S 148.8672°E)
- Tarewinnabar (25.0140°S 148.7445°E)
- Towrie (25.3114°S 148.8402°E)
- Wangalee (24.7023°S 148.8683°E)
- Warremba (25.0736°S 148.6655°E)

== Education ==
Arcadia Valley State School is a government primary (Prep-6) school for boys and girls at 4831 Arcadia Valley Road (25.2550°S 148.8208°E). In 2013, the school had five students and two teachers (one full-time equivalent). In 2018, the school had an enrolment of nine students with one teacher and four non-teaching staff (one full-time equivalent). The children come from local farms. The school does not have access to reticulated water and must depend on tanks filled by rainwater.

There are no nearby secondary schools. The alternatives are distance education and boarding schools.

== Amenities ==
There is a Uniting Church congregation in Arcadia Valley. Services are held at local homesteads.

== Attractions ==
Lake Nuga Nuga is within the locality. Part of the Nuga Nuga National Park, it is the largest natural lake in the Central Queensland sandstone belt and is popular for bird-watching (over 150 kinds of birds), fishing and canoeing.
