= Nuga Nuga National Park =

National park in Australia

- IUCN category II (national park)
- Location within Queensland
- Location: Queensland
- Nearest city: Rolleston
- Coordinates: 24°57′55″S 148°41′04″E
- Area: 28.60 km^{2} (11.04 sq mi)
- Established: 1993
- Governing body: Queensland Parks and Wildlife Service

Nuga Nuga is a national park in Queensland, Australia, 515 km NW of Brisbane. It lies adjacent to Lake Nuga Nuga in the Comet River water catchment area of the Brigalow Belt bioregion.

It contains small areas of lacustrine and riverine wetlands.

One rare of threatened reptile species, Denisonia maculata, has been identified in the national park.

== See also ==
- Protected areas of Queensland
