= Precipice National Park =

National park in Queensland, Australia

- IUCN category II (national park)
- Location within Queensland
- Location: Queensland
- Coordinates: 25.3127853°S 150.1043293°E
- Area: 105 km^{2} (41 sq mi)
- Established: 1998
- Governing body: Queensland Parks and Wildlife Service

Precipice is a national park in Queensland, Australia, 377 km northwest of Brisbane.

== See also ==
- Protected areas of Queensland
