= Beilba, Queensland =

Beilba
- Suburb
- Interactive map of Beilba
- Coordinates: 25.6513°S 148.85°E
- Country: Australia
- State: Queensland
- LGA: Maranoa Region
- Location: 49.0 km (30.4 mi) NE of Injune; 140 km (87 mi) N of Roma; 490 km (300 mi) NW of Toowoomba; 618 km (384 mi) NNW of Brisbane

Government
  - State electorate: Warrego
  - Federal division: Maranoa

Area
  - Total: 1,074.2 km^{2} (414.8 sq mi)

Population
  - Total: 35 (2021 census)
  - Density: 0.0326/km^{2} (0.0844/sq mi)
- Time zone: UTC+10:00 (AEST)
- Postcode: 4454
Suburbs around Beilba
Upper Dawson	Arcadia Valley	Baroondah
Baffle West	Beilba	Baroondah
Simmie	Highland Plains	Pony Hills

Beilba is a rural locality in the Maranoa Region, Queensland, Australia. In the 2021 census, Beilba had a population of 35 people.

== Geography ==
The Carnarvon Highway runs along part of the western boundary.

There are three sections of the Expedition National Park in the north and east of the locality. Doonkuna State Forest is in the west of the locality with Beilba State Forest in the east of the locality and Hallett State Forest in the south of the locality. Apart from these protected areas, the land use is predominantly grazing on native vegetation.

== Demographics ==
In the 2016 census, Beilba had a population of 49 people.

In the 2021 census, Beilba had a population of 35 people.

== Education ==
There are no schools in Beilba. The nearest government schools are Injune State School (Prep to Year 10) in Injune to the south-west and Aracadia Valley State School (Prep to Year 6) in neighbouring Arcadia Valley to the north. However, students in the north-east of Beilba might be too distant from these schools for a daily commute. Also, there are no nearby schools offering education to Year 12. The alternatives are distance education and boarding school.
