= Baroondah, Queensland =

Baroondah
- Suburb
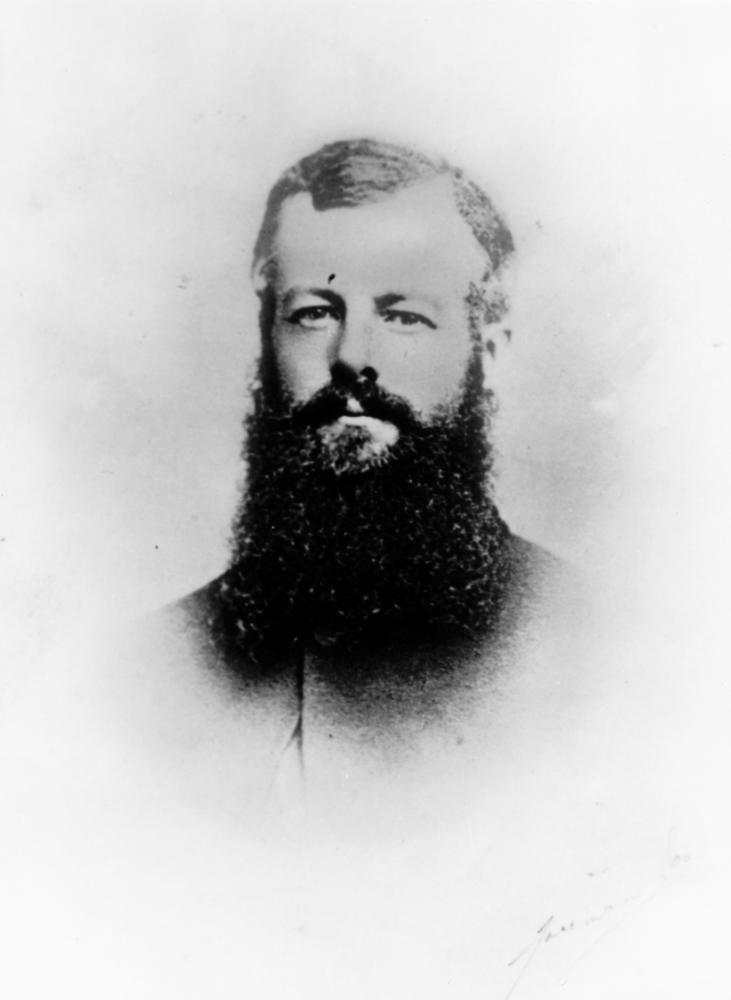
- Ernest Henry, 1867

- Interactive map of Baroondah
- Coordinates: 25.6827°S 149.1769°E
- Country: Australia
- State: Queensland
- LGA: Shire of Banana
- Location: 73.9 km (45.9 mi) ENE of Injune; 136 km (85 mi) NNE of Roma; 279 km (173 mi) SW of Biloela; 595 km (370 mi) NW of Brisbane

Government
  - State electorate: Callide
  - Federal division: Flynn

Area
  - Total: 1,328.9 km^{2} (513.1 sq mi)

Population
  - Total: 57 (2021 census)
  - Density: 0.0429/km^{2} (0.1111/sq mi)
- Time zone: UTC+10:00 (AEST)
- Postcode: 4454
Suburbs around Baroondah
Arcadia Valley	Glenhaughton	Broadmere
Beilba	Baroondah	Kinnoul
Pony Hills	Durham Downs; Waikola	Eurombah

Baroondah is a rural locality in the Shire of Banana, Queensland, Australia. In the 2021 census, Baroondah had a population of 57 people.

== Geography ==
The Dawson River enters the locality from the west (Beilba) and forms part of the western boundary of the locality before meandering east across the locality, where it forms part of the eastern boundary of the locality before exiting the location to the east (Kinnoul / Eurombah).

The north and east of the locality is within the Belington Hut State Forest, while the north-west and west of the locality is within the Expedition (Limited Depth) National Park and the Expedition Resources Reserve. In the centre of the locality is Stephenton State Forest with Hallett State Forest in the south-west of the locality, extending into neighbouring Pony Hills. Apart from these protected areas, the surface use of the freehold land in the centre and south of the locality is predominantly grazing on native vegetation. Coal seam gas extraction from underground takes place throughout much of the locality.

== History ==
Ernest Henry established a sheep and cattle station called Baroondah on the Dawson River in 1860. He had approximately 200 square miles (520 km^{2}) of land, stocked with 500 heifers, and 7,000 breeding ewes.

== Demographics ==
In the 2016 census, Baroondah had a population of 4 people.

In the 2021 census, Baroondah had a population of 57 people.

== Education ==
The nearest government school is Injune P-10 State School in Injune to the west. It provides primary and secondary schooling (Prep to Year 10). However, most of Baroondah is too distant from this school for a daily commute. The alternatives are distance education and boarding school.
