= Consuelo, Queensland =

Consuelo
- Suburb
- Interactive map of Consuelo
- Coordinates: 24.7063°S 148.3258°E
- Country: Australia
- State: Queensland
- LGA: Central Highlands Region
- Location: 34.6 km (21.5 mi) S of Rolleston; 105 km (65 mi) SE of Springsure; 173 km (107 mi) S of Emerald; 332 km (206 mi) SW of Rockhampton; 722 km (449 mi) NW of Brisbane

Government
  - State electorate: Gregory
  - Federal division: Flynn

Area
  - Total: 1,672.9 km^{2} (645.9 sq mi)

Population
  - Total: 35 (2021 census)
  - Density: 0.02092/km^{2} (0.0542/sq mi)
- Time zone: UTC+10:00 (AEST)
- Postcode: 4702
Suburbs around Consuelo
Wealwandangie	Albinia	Rolleston
Wealwandangie	Consuelo	Coorumbene
Carnarvon Park	Rewan	Arcadia Valley

Consuelo is a rural locality in the Central Highlands Region, Queensland, Australia. In the 2021 census, Consuelo had a population of 35 people.

== Geography ==
The Carnarvon Highway enters the locality from the north-east (Rolleston) and exits to the south (Rewan).

There are two sections of Mount Pleasant State Forest in the north and north-east of the locality. Apart from these protected areas, the predominant land use is grazing on native vegetation with a small amount of crop growing in the north-east of the locality.

Consuelo has the following mountains, mostly in the west of the locality (from north to south):

- Mount Sugarloaf (24.6856°S 148.1732°E) 737 metres (2,418 ft)
- Mount Ogg (24.7006°S 148.1923°E) 682 metres (2,238 ft)
- Mount Lane (24.7068°S 148.0309°E) 917 metres (3,009 ft)
- Pinnacle Mountain (24.7285°S 148.0308°E) 726 metres (2,382 ft)
- Pins Head (24.7502°S 148.0578°E) 820 metres (2,690 ft)
- Mount Styx (24.7525°S 148.1061°E) 825 metres (2,707 ft)
- Mount Acheron (24.7613°S 148.0660°E) 857 metres (2,812 ft)
- Mount Charon (24.7807°S 148.0469°E) 985 metres (3,232 ft)
- Mount Cerberus (24.8165°S 148.0804°E) 1,036 metres (3,399 ft)
- The Steeple (24.8487°S 147.9609°E) 1,060 metres (3,480 ft)

with two in the east of the locality (from north to south):

- Mount Panorama (24.5489°S 148.5386°E) 290 metres (950 ft)
- Mount Ceres (24.7573°S 148.5872°E) 436 metres (1,430 ft)

== Demographics ==
In the 2016 census, Consuelo had a population of 35 people.

In the 2021 census, Consuelo had a population of 35 people.

== Education ==
There are no schools in Consuelo. The nearest government primary school is Rolleston State School in neighbouring Rolleston to the north-east; however, students from some parts of Consuelo would be too distant for a daily commute to this school. There are no secondary schools nearby. The alternatives are distance education and boarding school.
