= Highland Plains, Queensland (Maranoa Region) =

Highland Plains
- Suburb
- Interactive map of Highland Plains
- Coordinates: 25.8694°S 148.7575°E
- Country: Australia
- State: Queensland
- LGA: Maranoa Region
- Location: 23.4 km (14.5 mi) E of Injune; 114 km (71 mi) N of Roma; 133 km (83 mi) W of Taroom; 464 km (288 mi) NW of Toowoomba; 591 km (367 mi) NW of Brisbane

Government
  - State electorate: Warrego
  - Federal division: Maranoa

Area
  - Total: 213.0 km^{2} (82.2 sq mi)

Population
  - Total: 16 (2021 census)
  - Density: 0.0751/km^{2} (0.195/sq mi)
- Time zone: UTC+10:00 (AEST)
- Postcode: 4454
Suburbs around Highland Plains
Simmie	Beilba	Pony Hills
Injune	Highland Plains	Pony Hills
Gunnewin	Gunnewin	Eumamurrin

Highland Plains is a rural locality in the Maranoa Region, Queensland, Australia. In the 2021 census, Highland Plains had a population of 16 people.

== Geography ==
Round Mountain is in the east of the locality (25.8681°S 148.8247°E), rising to 460 metres (1,510 ft) above sea level.

The Carnarvon Highway passes to the west through neighbouring Injune. The Injune Taroom Road enters the locality from the north-west (Injune) and exits to the north-east (Beilba / Pony Hills).

The land use is grazing on native vegetation.

== Demographics ==
In the 2016 census, Highland Plains had a population of 5 people.

In the 2021 census, Highland Plains had a population of 16 people.

== Education ==
There are no schools in Highland Plains. The nearest government primary schools are Injune State School in neighbouring Injune to the west and Bymount East State School in Bymount to the south-west. The nearest government secondary school is Injune State School (to Year 10). There are no nearby schools providing education to Year 12; the alternatives are distance education and boarding school.
