= Mount Moffatt, Queensland =

Mount Moffatt
- Suburb
- Interactive map of Mount Moffatt
- Coordinates: 25.1622°S 147.8661°E
- Country: Australia
- State: Queensland
- LGA: Maranoa Region
- Location: 146 km (91 mi) NNW of Injune; 285 km (177 mi) NNW of Roma; 587 km (365 mi) NW of Toowoomba; 714 km (444 mi) NW of Brisbane

Government
  - State electorate: Warrego
  - Federal division: Maranoa

Area
  - Total: 2,120.0 km^{2} (818.5 sq mi)

Population
  - Total: 14 (2021 census)
  - Density: 0.00660/km^{2} (0.0171/sq mi)
- Time zone: UTC+10:00 (AEST)
- Postcode: 4465
Suburbs around Mount Moffatt
Upper Warrego	Carnarvon Park	Rewan
Upper Warrego	Mount Moffatt	Carnarvon Park
Upper Warrego	Womblebank	Mount Howe

Mount Moffatt is a rural locality in the Maranoa Region, Queensland, Australia. In the 2021 census, Mount Moffatt had a population of 14 people.

Mount Moffatt's postcode is 4465.

== Geography ==
The locality is bounded to the north-west by the Chesterton Range, to the north and north-east by the Great Dividing Range, and to the east by the Merivale River. The locality is within the Murray-Darling basin.

The terrain is quite mountainous with the following named features (from north to south);

- Mount Rugged (24.9000°S 147.9985°E) 1,130 metres (3,710 ft)
- Gee Gee Gap (24.9198°S 147.8955°E)
- Mount Campbell (25.0066°S 147.7939°E) 949 metres (3,114 ft)
- Mount Moffatt (25.0578°S 148.0442°E) 1,097 metres (3,599 ft)
- The Observatory (25.0680°S 147.9832°E)
- Rough Mountain (25.0963°S 147.8055°E)
- Mount Macleay (25.1229°S 147.9751°E) 870 metres (2,850 ft)
- Mount Judy (25.1607°S 147.7502°E) 833 metres (2,733 ft)
- Mount Misery (25.2173°S 147.7148°E) 903 metres (2,963 ft)
- Mount Clift (25.2822°S 147.6400°E) 842 metres (2,762 ft)
- Mount Ogilby (25.2863°S 147.9100°E) 984 metres (3,228 ft)
- Ogilby Knob (25.2987°S 147.8980°E)
- Mount Eddystone (25.3021°S 147.8297°E) 890 metres (2,920 ft)

The Maranoa River rises in the locality with the west branch rising in the north of the locality (24.94185°S 148.03174°E) and the east branch rising in the north-east of the locality (25.02058°S 148.09040°E). The two branches of the river flow south with their confluence in the south of the locality (25.28844°S 147.76686°E).

There are a number of protected areas within the locality:

- part of the Carnarvon National Park is in the north of the locality
- the McLeay State Forest is in the east of the locality
- the Forfar State Forest is in the south-east of the locality
- part of the Attica State Forest is in the south-west of the locality

Apart from the protected areas, the land use is grazing on native vegetation.

== History ==
The locality was initially called Mount Moffat, but changed to Mount Moffatt on 18 October 2002. It is presumably named after the mountain Mount Moffatt within the locality.

== Demographics ==
In the 2016 census, Mount Moffatt had "no people or a very low population".

In the 2021 census, Mount Moffatt had a population of 14 people.

== Education ==
There are no schools in Mount Moffatt nor nearby. The alternatives are distance education and boarding school.
