= Dawson River (Queensland) =

River in Queensland, Australia

Dawson
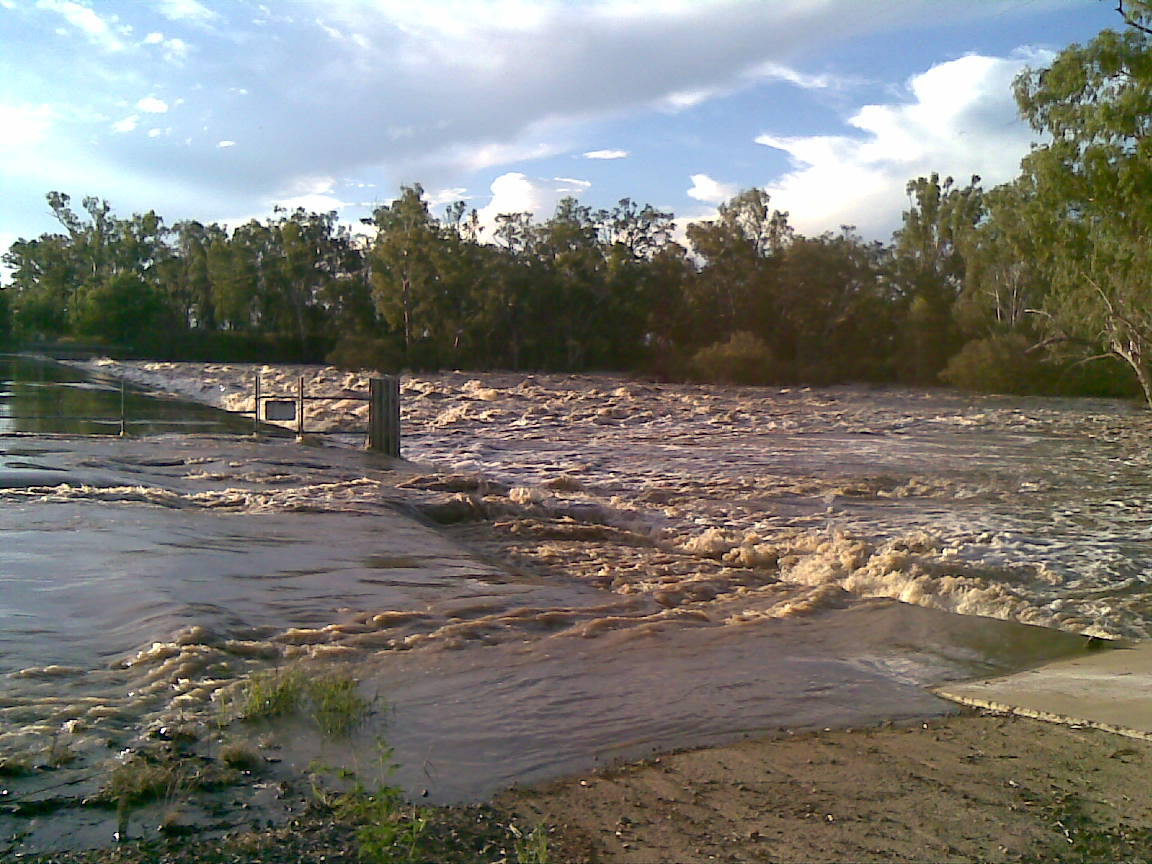
- Dawson River near Moura

- Location of Dawson River mouth in Queensland
- Etymology: In honour of Robert Dawson

Location
- Country: Australia
- State: Queensland
- Region: Central Queensland
- Towns: Baralaba, Theodore, Taroom

Physical characteristics
- Source: Carnarvon Range
  - location: northwest of Upper Dawson
  - coordinates: 25°17′52″S 148°34′03″E
  - elevation: 642 m (2,106 ft)
- Mouth: confluence with the Mackenzie River to form the Fitzroy River
  - location: northeast of Duaringa
  - coordinates: 24°57′50″S 150°04′23″E
  - elevation: 55 m (180 ft)
- Length: 735 km (457 mi)
- Basin size: 50,800 km^{2} (19,600 sq mi)

Basin features
- River system: Fitzroy River
- Tributaries
  - right: Don River (Central Queensland)
- National parks: Carnarvon National Park; Expedition National Park; Precipice National Park

The Dawson River is a river in Central Queensland, Australia.

== Course and features ==
The Dawson River rises at the eastern end of the Carnarvon Range in Boxvale State Forest and adjacent private lands. This is a rugged forested area of sandstone gorges in which the river is an ephemeral stream with some permanent, spring-fed waterholes. The Carnarvon Highway crosses the river in this headwater area before the upper section of the river drains southeast as an intermittent stream traversing the rugged Lonesome and Beilba sections of Expedition National Park, at the southern end of the Arcadia Valley. This upper section of the Dawson ends at the confluence with Hutton Creek, a spring-fed stream that marks the upper limit of permanent flow. The middle section of the Dawson River flows generally east from the Baroondah crossing to Taroom on the Leichhardt Highway and northeast to the Glebe Weir, where the river turns north and traverses the Precipice Range through Nathan Gorge, another rugged area of wooded sandstone ranges. From here the lower section of the river meanders through a broad valley of gently undulating lowlands and irrigated floodplains, being crossed again by the Leichhardt Highway at Theodore, and continuing north through Baralaba towards Duaringa, where it is crossed by the Capricorn Highway. A little further north, the Dawson River meets its confluence with the Mackenzie River to form the Fitzroy River. From source to confluence, the river is joined by sixty-four tributaries, including the Don River, and descends 587 metres (1,926 ft) over its 735-kilometre (457 mi) course. Several weirs have been constructed along the lower Dawson river to provide water for cotton and dairy farming in the region. The river catchment covers an area of 50,800 square kilometres (19,600 sq mi).

Expedition National Park and the Precipice National Park are protected areas along the Dawson River.

The Dawson River was one of a number of Queensland rivers affected by the 2010–11 Queensland floods. As the river inundated the town of Theodore it was completely evacuated, a first in Queensland's history.

== History ==
Yiman (also known as Iman and Jiman), Wuli Wuli, and Gangalu are Australian Aboriginal languages of the Dawson River in Central Queensland. The language region includes areas within the local government areas of Maranoa Regional Council and Banana Shire Council.

Ludwig Leichhardt explored the area in 1844 and named the river in honour of Robert Dawson, one of Leichhardt's financial backers.

The Hornet Bank massacre of settlers occurred along the Dawson near Taroom and was followed by reprisal attacks, massacres and dispersion of the indigenous Iman people.

In the 1920s, shortly after the First World War, Australian Labor Party politician Ted Theodore (1884–1950) launched an irrigation program on the Dawson River for returning soldiers. His intentions was to provide them with arable land along the river for them to take up farming, thus eschewing a post-war recession. After the 1922 Irrigation Act was passed, he started irrigation schemes on the Dawson River, for an initial 8,000 new farmers. However, the scheme was abandoned after he realised the soil was unsuitable for farming and the returning soldiers had no agrarian skills.

== See also ==
- Boggomoss
- List of rivers of Australia § Queensland
