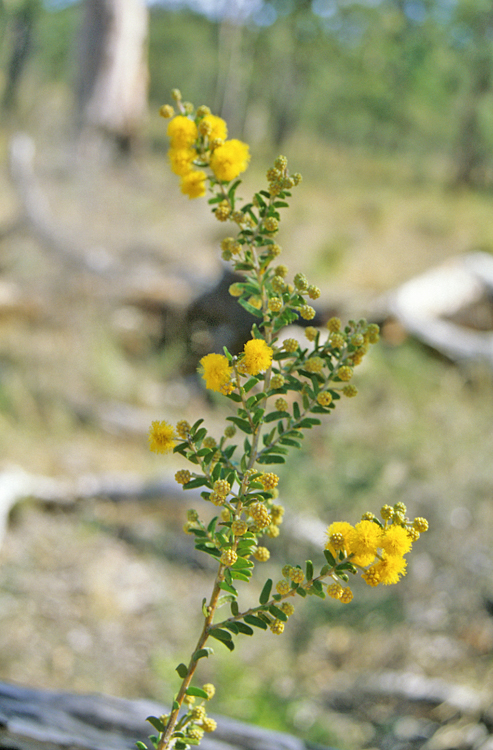
- In the Carnarvon Station Bush Heritage Reserve

Scientific classification
- Kingdom: Plantae
- Clade: Embryophytes
- Clade: Tracheophytes
- Clade: Spermatophytes
- Clade: Angiosperms
- Clade: Eudicots
- Clade: Rosids
- Order: Fabales
- Family: Fabaceae
- Subfamily: Caesalpinioideae
- Clade: Mimosoid clade
- Genus: Acacia
- Species: A. resinicostata

Binomial name
- Acacia resinicostata Pedley
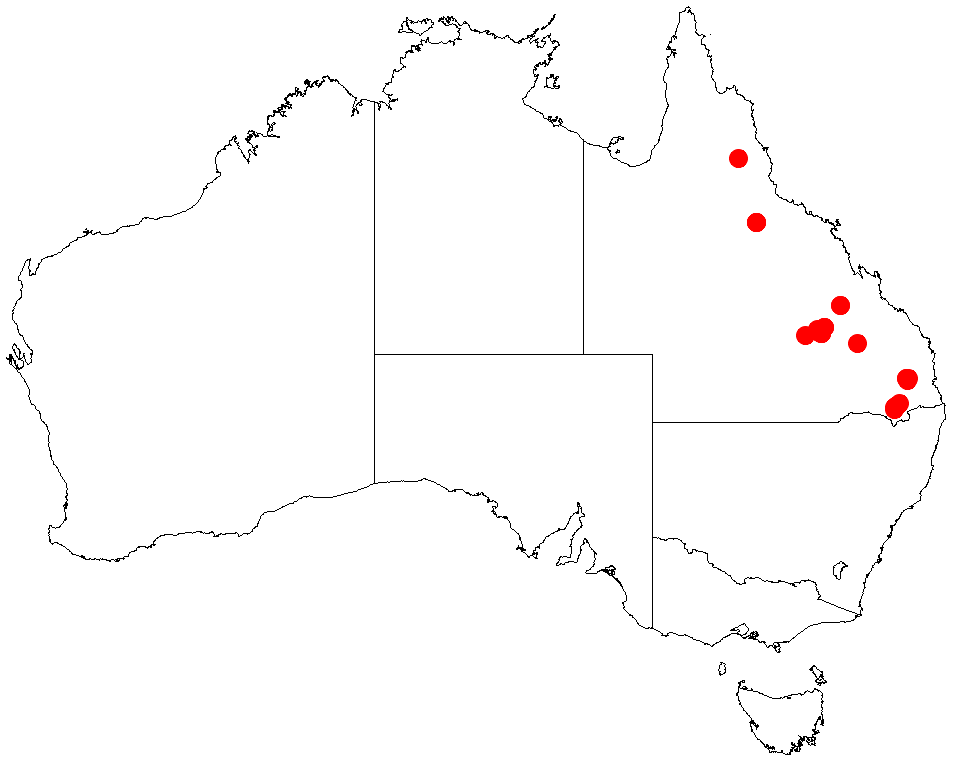
- Occurrence data from AVH

= Acacia resinicostata =

Species of legume

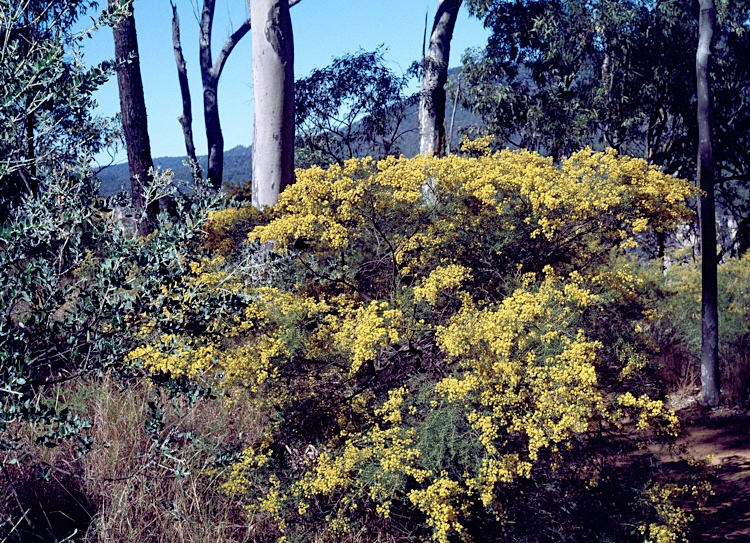
Habit in Carnarvon Gorge

Acacia resinicostata is a shrub belonging to the genus Acacia and the subgenus Phyllodineae native to north eastern Australia.

== Description ==
The glabrous and somewhat resinous shrub typically grows to a height of 2 to 3 metres (6.6 to 9.8 ft) and has a bushy, rounded habit. It branchlets have small rounded protuberances and crowded, light green, linear to narrowly oblong shaped flat phyllodes that are straight or incurved. They have a length of 5 to 20 mm (0.20 to 0.79 in) and a width of 0.5 to 1 mm (0.020 to 0.039 in) and are abruptly constricted at the base with an obscure midrib. The simple inflorescences occur singly in the axils and have spherical flower-heads that contain 25 to 35 deep lemon yellow coloured flowers. The firmly chartaceous seed pods that form after flowering have a narrowly oblong shape with a length up to 8 cm (3.1 in) containing longitudinally arranged seeds. The black seeds have an oblong-elliptic shape with a length of 4 to 5 mm (0.16 to 0.20 in) and a cream coloured clavate aril.

== Distribution ==
It is a disjunct distribution and is endemic to a small area in the Carnarvon Range in south eastern Queensland and around 300 km (190 mi) further south between Djuan and Karara where it is found in dissected sandstone country in skeletal soils as a part of open woodland communities.

== See also ==
- List of Acacia species
