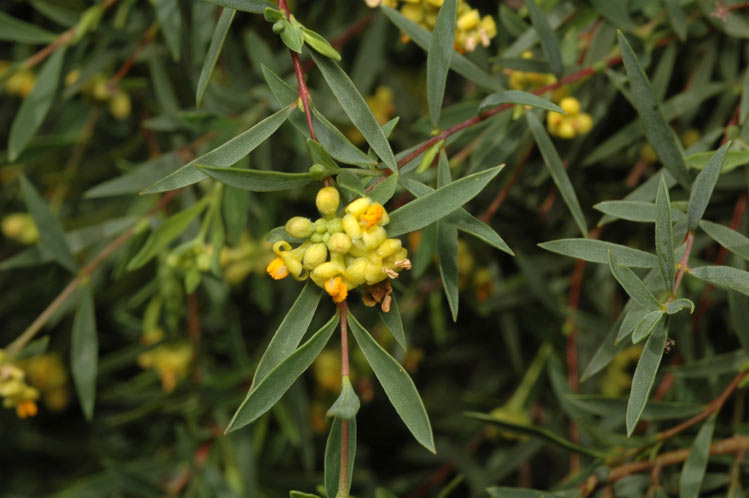
- In the Australian National Botanic Gardens

Scientific classification
- Kingdom: Plantae
- Clade: Tracheophytes
- Clade: Angiosperms
- Clade: Eudicots
- Clade: Rosids
- Order: Malvales
- Family: Thymelaeaceae
- Genus: Pimelea
- Species: P. neoanglica

Binomial name
- Pimelea neoanglica Threlfall

= Pimelea neoanglica =

Species of shrub

Pimelea neoanglica, commonly known as poison pimelea or scanty riceflower, is a species of flowering plant in the family Thymelaeaceae and is endemic to inland areas of eastern Australia. It is an erect, dioecious shrub with narrowly elliptic leaves and heads of greenish-yellow flowers.

== Description ==
Pimelea neoanglica is an erect, dioecious shrub that typically grows to a height of up to 3 m (9.8 ft) and has slender, glabrous stems. Its leaves are arranged in opposite pairs, narrowly elliptic, mostly 4–45 mm (0.16–1.77 in) long and 1.0–5.5 mm (0.039–0.217 in) wide on a short petiole. The flowers are arranged on the ends of branches in compact clusters of 3 to 24, usually with 2 narrowly egg-shaped or narrowly elliptic, green involucral bracts 3–23 mm (0.12–0.91 in) long at the base. The flowers are greenish-yellow, the male flowers about 5 mm (0.20 in) long and the female flowers about 3 mm (0.12 in) long. Flowering occurs in most months, but with a peak in September and October.

== Taxonomy ==
Pimelea neoanglica was first formally described in 1983 by S. Threlfall in the journal Brunonia from specimens collected near Warialda by Edwin Cheel in 1929.

== Distribution and habitat ==
Poison pimelea mostly grows in clay soils on the Great Dividing Range and nearby ranges of eastern Australia from Carnarvon Station Reserve in Queensland to Gloucester in New South Wales.
