= Maranoa River =

Maranoa
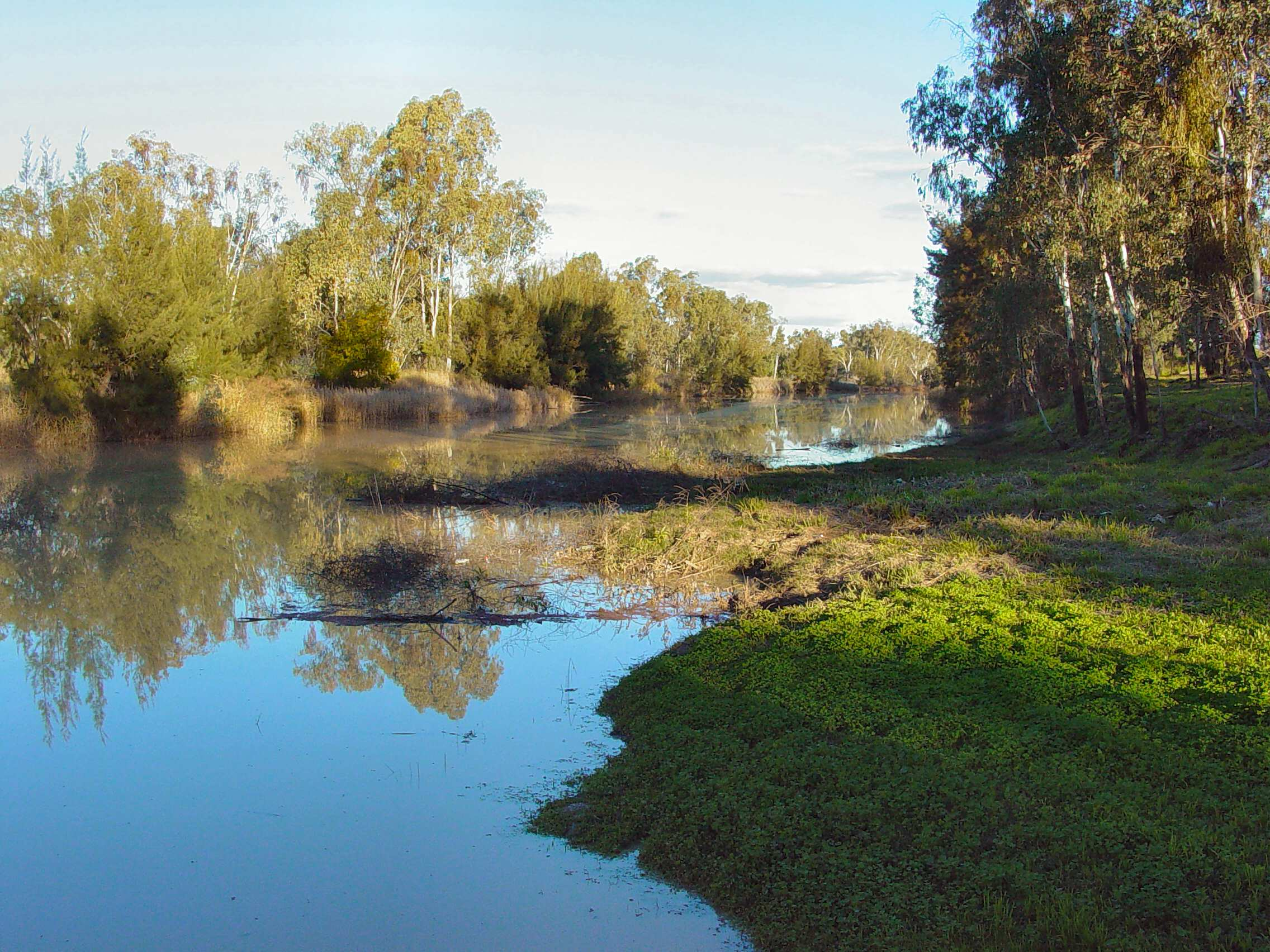
- Downstream of the Maranoa River at Mitchell

- Location of the Maranoa River mouth in Queensland

Location
- Country: Australia
- State: Queensland
- Region: South West Queensland

Physical characteristics
- Source: Consuelo Tableland
- Source confluence: East and West branches of the Maranoa River
  - location: Carnarvon National Park
  - coordinates: 25°17′20″S 147°46′02″E
  - elevation: 574 m (1,883 ft)
- Mouth: confluence with the Balonne River
  - location: Lake Kajarabie
  - coordinates: 27°50′11″S 148°36′57″E
  - elevation: 207 m (679 ft)
- Length: 519 km (322 mi)
- Basin size: 20,039 km^{2} (7,737 sq mi)

Basin features
- River system: Darling River catchment, Murray–Darling basin
- Tributaries
  - left: Merivale River
- National park: Carnarvon National Park

The Maranoa River, part of the Murray-Darling basin, is a river in South West Queensland, Australia.

== Course and features ==
Formed by the confluence of the west and east branches of the river, the Maranoa River rises on the Consuelo Tableland in the Carnarvon National Park. The valleys in the river's catchment area are broad rather than gorge-like as in the nearby Carnarvon Gorge, with isolated bluffs and pillars of sandstone on sandy plains. The Maranoa passes through Mitchell and flows south towards St George. The river reaches its confluence with the Balonne River north of St George. The Balonne eventually flows into the Darling River (via a few branches), so it contributes to the Murray-Darling Basin. From source to mouth, the Maranoa is joined by 31 tributaries including the Merivale River and descends 366 metres (1,201 ft) over its 519-kilometre (322 mi) course.

The Warrego Highway crosses the river at Mitchell.

== History ==
The river's name was recorded by explorer Thomas Mitchell on 13 May 1846 in his Journal of an expedition into the interior of tropical Australia. The name derives from two conversations between Mitchell and local Indigenous people. The name might be corruption of the Mandandanji words mara meaning duck, and ngoa meaning egg.

The Neil Turner Weir was built on the river in 1984. It provides limited supplies for irrigation purposes. It also regulates streamflow and has recreational uses.

Major flooding on the river occurred in 1990.

== Popular culture ==
A number of Australian folksongs (such as Sandy Maranoa and The Maranoa Drovers) refer to this river.

== See also ==
- List of rivers of Australia § Queensland
