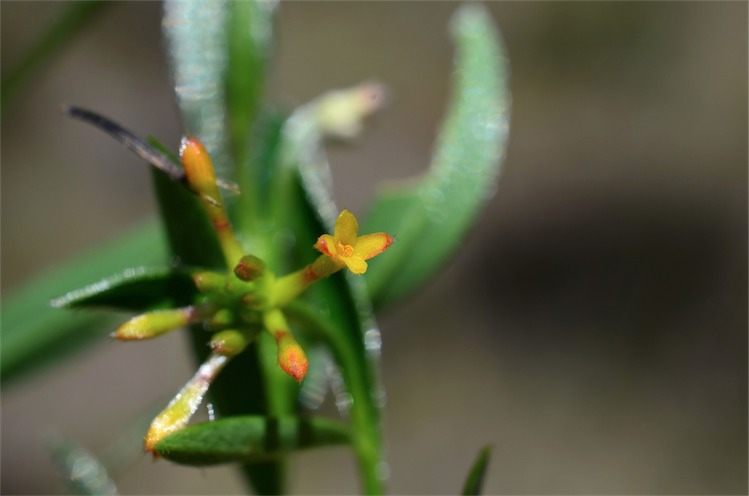
- In Carnarvon Station Reserve

Scientific classification
- Kingdom: Plantae
- Clade: Tracheophytes
- Clade: Angiosperms
- Clade: Eudicots
- Clade: Rosids
- Order: Malvales
- Family: Thymelaeaceae
- Genus: Pimelea
- Species: P. strigosa

Binomial name
- Pimelea strigosa Gand.

= Pimelea strigosa =

Species of plant

Pimelea strigosa, is a flowering plant in the family Thymelaeaceae and is endemic to eastern Australia. It is a shrub with hairy young stems, elliptic leaves and heads of 7 to 23 yellow flowers, sometimes with a red tinge.

== Description ==
Pimelea strigosa is a shrub that typically grows to a height of 0.3–2 m (1 ft 0 in – 6 ft 7 in) and has hairy young stems and leaves. The leaves are arranged alternately along the stems, narrowly elliptic to elliptic, 8–35 mm (0.31–1.38 in) long and 2–10 mm (0.079–0.394 in) wide on a short petiole. The flowers are arranged on the ends of branches in compact groups of 7 to 23, bisexual or female, yellow, sometimes with a red tinge. The floral tube is 3.0–5.5 mm (0.12–0.22 in) long, the sepals 1–2 mm (0.039–0.079 in) long. Flowering occurs in most months with a peak from September to May and the fruit is about 4 mm (0.16 in) long.

== Taxonomy and naming ==
Pimelea strigosa was first formally described in 1913 by Michel Gandoger in the journal Bulletin de la Société Botanique de France, from specimens collected near the Warrumbungles. The specific epithet (strigosa) means "strigose".

== Distribution and habitat ==
This pimelea grows in woodland and in pastures, often near watercourses and sometimes in rocky places, between Warwick in Queensland and the Warrumbungles and Murrurundi in New South Wales.
