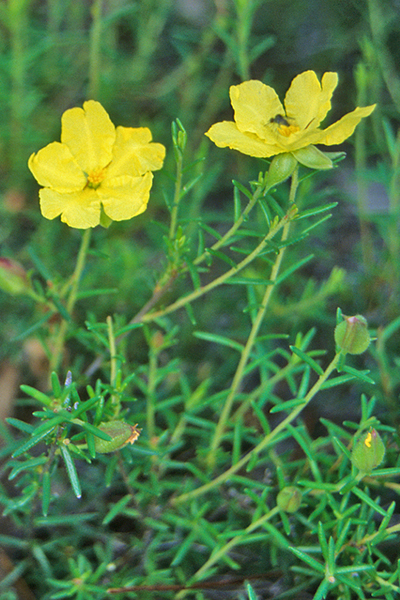
- On Carnarvon Station Reserve

Scientific classification
- Kingdom: Plantae
- Clade: Tracheophytes
- Clade: Angiosperms
- Clade: Eudicots
- Order: Dilleniales
- Family: Dilleniaceae
- Genus: Hibbertia
- Species: H. cistoidea

Binomial name
- Hibbertia cistoidea (Hook.) C.T.White

= Hibbertia cistoidea =

Species of plant

Hibbertia cistoidea is a species of flowering plant in the family Dilleniaceae and is endemic to eastern Australia. It is an erect shrub with hairy foliage, linear to narrow lance-shaped leaves, and yellow flowers arranged on the ends of short side shoots, with six to twelve stamens arranged on one side of the carpels.

== Description ==
Hibbertia cistoidea is an erect shrub that typically grows to a height of 0.6–1.0 m (2 ft 0 in – 3 ft 3 in) with foliage covered with star-shaped hairs. The leaves are linear to lance-shaped with the narrower end towards the base, 4–15 mm (0.16–0.59 in) long and 1–2.5 mm (0.039–0.098 in) wide, the tip wedge-shaped or notched and the edges rolled under. The flowers are on the ends of short side shoots and are sessile or on a peduncle up to 8 mm (0.31 in) long. The five sepals are 4–6 mm (0.16–0.24 in) long and the petals are yellow and 5–6 mm (0.20–0.24 in) long. There are six to twelve stamens in a group on one side of the two hairy carpels. Flowering occurs from spring to autumn.

== Taxonomy ==
This species was first described in 1848 by William Jackson Hooker who gave it the name Pleurandra cistoidea in Thomas Mitchell's Journal of an Expedition into the Interior of Tropical Australia. In 1946, Cyril Tenison White changed the name to Hibbertia cistoidea in Proceedings of the Royal Society of Queensland. The specific epithet (cistoidea) means Cistus-like.

== Distribution ==
This uncommon hibbertia occurs in Queensland and as far south as the South West Slopes in New South Wales.

== See also ==
- List of Hibbertia species
