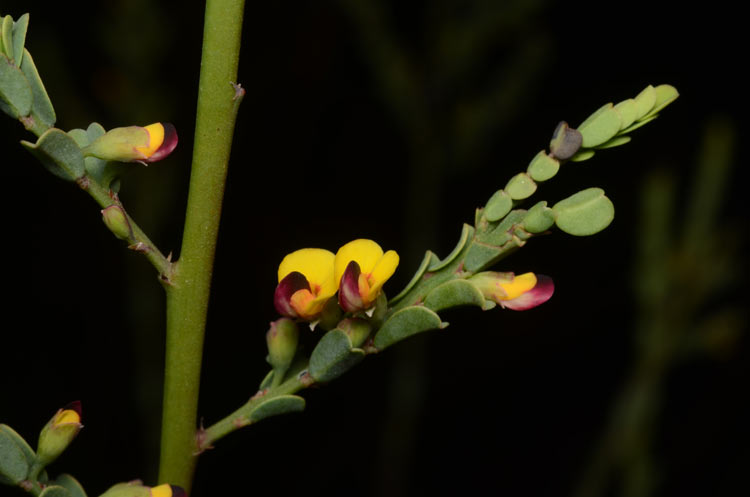
- In the Carnarvon National Park

Scientific classification
- Kingdom: Plantae
- Clade: Tracheophytes
- Clade: Angiosperms
- Clade: Eudicots
- Clade: Rosids
- Order: Fabales
- Family: Fabaceae
- Subfamily: Faboideae
- Genus: Bossiaea
- Species: B. concolor

Binomial name
- Bossiaea concolor (Maiden & Betche) I.Thomps.

= Bossiaea concolor =

Species of legume

Bossiaea concolor is a species of flowering plant in the family Fabaceae and is endemic to eastern Australia. It is an erect shrub with elliptic to oblong or egg-shaped leaves with the lower end towards the base, and yellow and red flowers.

== Description ==
Bossiaea concolor is an erect shrub that typically grows to a height of up to 3 m (9.8 ft) and has more or less glabrous branchlets. The leaves are elliptic to oblong or egg-shaped leaves with the lower end towards the base, 3–8 mm (0.12–0.31 in) long and 2–5 mm (0.079–0.197 in) wide on a petiole 0.5–1.0 mm (0.020–0.039 in) long with narrow triangular stipules 0.7–1.5 mm (0.028–0.059 in) long at the base. The leaves are usually concave or folded lengthwise. The flowers are borne along side-branchlets on pedicels 1–4 mm (0.039–0.157 in) long with a bract 0.6–1.0 mm (0.024–0.039 in) long. The sepals are 2–4 mm (0.079–0.157 in) long and joined at the base with egg-shaped to elliptic bracteoles 0.7–1.0 mm (0.028–0.039 in) long at the base. The five sepal lobes are 0.5–1.5 mm (0.020–0.059 in) long, the upper two lobes much broader than the lower ones. The standard petal is yellow with a red base and up to 9 mm (0.35 in) long, the wings yellow, 1–2 mm (0.039–0.079 in) shorter than the keel, and the keel has a red base. Flowering occurs in late winter and spring and the fruit is an oblong to elliptic pod 15–25 mm (0.59–0.98 in) long.

== Taxonomy ==
This species was first formally described in 1908 by Joseph Maiden and Ernst Betche who gave it the name Bossiaea rhombifolia subsp. concolor in the Proceedings of the Linnean Society of New South Wales. In 2012 Ian R. Thompson raised the variety to species status as Bossiaea concolor in the journal Muelleria. The specific epithet (concolor) means "uniformly coloured".

== Distribution and habitat ==
Bossiaea concolor grows in woodland and forest, mostly to the west of the Great Dividing Range, from near Shoalwater Bay in Queensland to near Mudgee in New South Wales.
