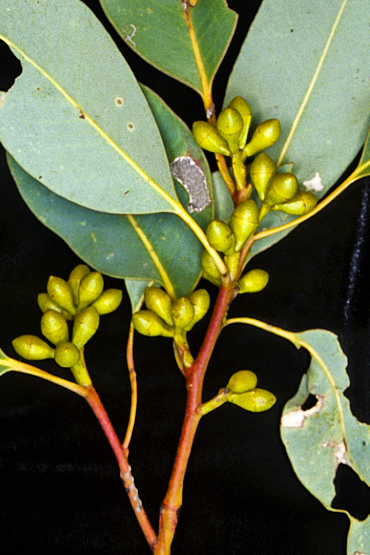
- Flower buds of Eucalyptus grisea

Conservation status
- Data Deficient (IUCN 3.1)

Scientific classification
- Kingdom: Plantae
- Clade: Tracheophytes
- Clade: Angiosperms
- Clade: Eudicots
- Clade: Rosids
- Order: Myrtales
- Family: Myrtaceae
- Genus: Eucalyptus
- Species: E. grisea

Binomial name
- Eucalyptus grisea L.A.S.Johnson & K.D.Hill

= Eucalyptus grisea =

Grey gum

Species of eucalyptus

Eucalyptus grisea, commonly known as grey gum, is a species of tree that is endemic to central Queensland. It has smooth greyish bark, lance-shaped to egg-shaped adult leaves, flower buds in groups of seven, white flower and usually cup-shaped fruit.

== Description ==
Eucalyptus grisea is a tree that typically grows to a height of 28 m (92 ft) and has smooth, patchy whitish and dark greyish brown bark. Young plants and coppice regrowth have leaves that are paler on the lower surface, petiolate, up to 100 mm (3.9 in) long and 30–50 mm (1.2–2.0 in) wide. Adult leaves are lance-shaped to egg-shaped or curved, dark green on the upper surface, paler below, 100–180 mm (3.9–7.1 in) long and 30–60 mm (1.2–2.4 in) wide on a petiole 17–33 mm (0.67–1.30 in) long. The flower buds are arranged in leaf axils on an unbranched peduncle 8–15 mm (0.31–0.59 in) long, the individual buds on pedicels 2–4 mm (0.079–0.157 in) long. Mature buds are oval, 7–10 mm (0.28–0.39 in) long and 4–5 mm (0.16–0.20 in) wide with a conical operculum. The flowers are white and the fruit is a woody, usually cup-shaped capsule 4–9 mm (0.16–0.35 in) long and 8–12 mm (0.31–0.47 in) wide with the valves protruding above rim level.

== Taxonomy and naming ==
Eucalyptus grisea was first formally described in 2000 by Ken Hill and Lawrie Johnson, and the description was published in the journal Telopea. The specific epithet grisea is from the late Latin, griseus, meaning "grey", referring to the colour of the bark.

== Distribution and habitat ==
Grey gum grows in woodland and open forest and occurs in the Carnarvon Range in central Queensland.

== Conservation status ==
This eucalypt is classified as "least concern" under the Queensland Government Nature Conservation Act 1992.

== See also ==
- List of Eucalyptus species
