= Ptilotus daphneae =

Conservation status
- Priority One — Poorly Known Taxa (DEC)

Scientific classification
- Kingdom: Plantae
- Clade: Tracheophytes
- Clade: Angiosperms
- Clade: Eudicots
- Order: Caryophyllales
- Family: Amaranthaceae
- Genus: Ptilotus
- Species: P. daphneae

Binomial name
- Ptilotus daphneae Lally

Synonyms
- Ptilotus daphne Lally orth.var.

Species of grass-like plant

Ptilotus daphneae is a species of flowering plant in the family Amaranthaceae and is endemic to inland areas of central Western Australia. It is a shrub with narrowly elliptic to egg-shaped leaves, and hemispherical spikes of 7 to 10 purple flowers.

== Description ==
Ptilotus daphneae is a shrub that typically grows to a height of 30 cm (12 in) and has hairy, striated stems that become glabrous with age. The leaves are more or less sessile, green and somewhat fleshy, narrowly elliptic to egg-shaped, 2–5.5 mm (0.079–0.217 in) long and 0.5–1.5 mm (0.020–0.059 in) long. The flower spikes are loosely hemispherical, up to 25 mm (0.98 in) long on a rachis up to 8 mm (0.31 in) long, with 7 to 10 purple flowers 15–19 mm (0.59–0.75 in) long. The tepals are linear and curve outwards, partly hairy and partly glabrous, the outer tepals 1–2 mm (0.039–0.079 in) longer than the inner tepals. There are two fertile stamens and 3 staminodes and the ovary is hairy.

== Taxonomy ==
This species was first formally described in 2009 by Terena R. Lally who gave it the name Ptilotus daphne in the journal Nuytsia from specimens collected in the Little Desert National Park. In 2023, the Western Australian Herbarium changed the name to Ptilotus daphneae, referring to Alex George's book, Western Australian Plant Names and their Meanings. The specific epithet (daphneae) honours Ms Daphne Edinger, a volunteer at the Western Australian Herbarium.

== Distribution and habitat ==
Ptilotus daphneae has been observed growing on a stony, quartzite ridge, and is restricted to the Carnarvon Range about 160 km (99 mi) north-north-east of Wiluna in the Gascoyne and Little Sandy Desert bioregions of northern Western Australia.

== Conservation status ==
Ptilotus daphneae is listed as "Priority One" by the Government of Western Australia Department of Biodiversity, Conservation and Attractions, meaning that it is known from only one or a few locations where it is potentially at risk.

== See also ==
- List of Ptilotus species
