= Merivale River =

Merivale
- Location of the Merivale River mouth in Queensland

Location
- Country: Australia
- State: Queensland
- Region: South West Queensland

Physical characteristics
- Source: Carnarvon Range, Great Dividing Range
  - location: below Mount Eden
  - elevation: 574 m (1,883 ft)
- Mouth: confluence with the Maranoa River
  - coordinates: 25°53′16″S 147°51′22″E
  - elevation: 401 m (1,316 ft)
- Length: 205 km (127 mi)
- Basin size: 3,460 km^{2} (1,340 sq mi)

Basin features
- River system: Darling River catchment, Murray–Darling basin
- National park: Carnarvon National Park

The Merivale River, part of the Darling catchment of the Murray-Darling basin, is a river in South West Queensland, Australia.

== Course and features ==
The Merivale River rises on the southern slopes of the Carnarvon Range near Mount Eden, part of the southwestern slopes of the Great Dividing Range. The river flows generally in a southerly direction and joins the Maranoa River west of Injune. The Sandy, Box and Smith Creeks are the river's main tributaries. The river's catchment area is approximately 3,460 square kilometres (1,340 sq mi). The river descends 277 metres (909 ft) over its 205-kilometre (127 mi) course.

== See also ==
- List of rivers of Australia § Queensland
