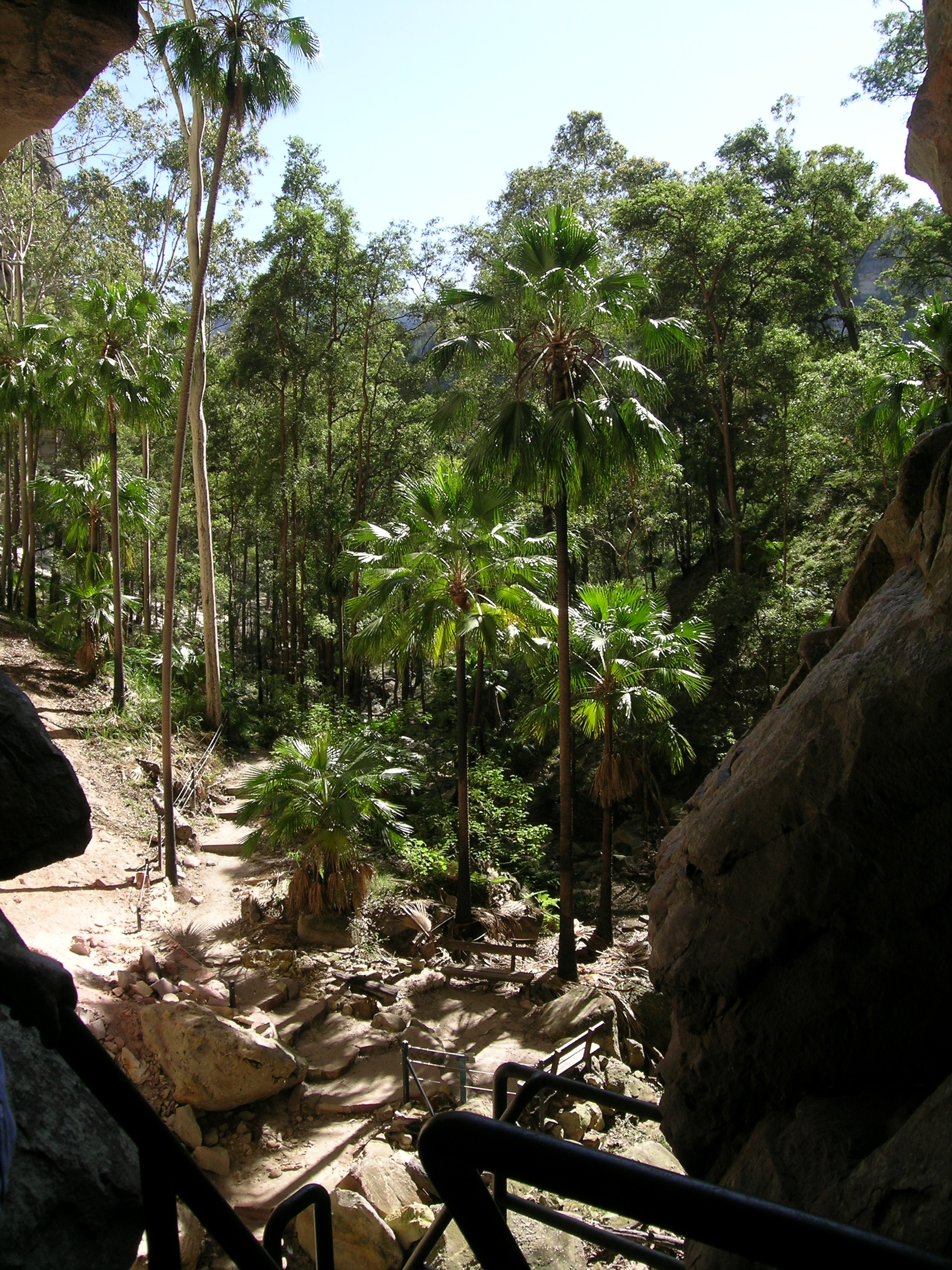

Scientific classification
- Kingdom: Plantae
- Clade: Tracheophytes
- Clade: Angiosperms
- Clade: Monocots
- Clade: Commelinids
- Order: Arecales
- Family: Arecaceae
- Tribe: Trachycarpeae
- Genus: Livistona
- Species: L. nitida

Binomial name
- Livistona nitida Rodd

Synonyms
- Livistona sp. Carnarvon

= Livistona nitida =

Species of palm

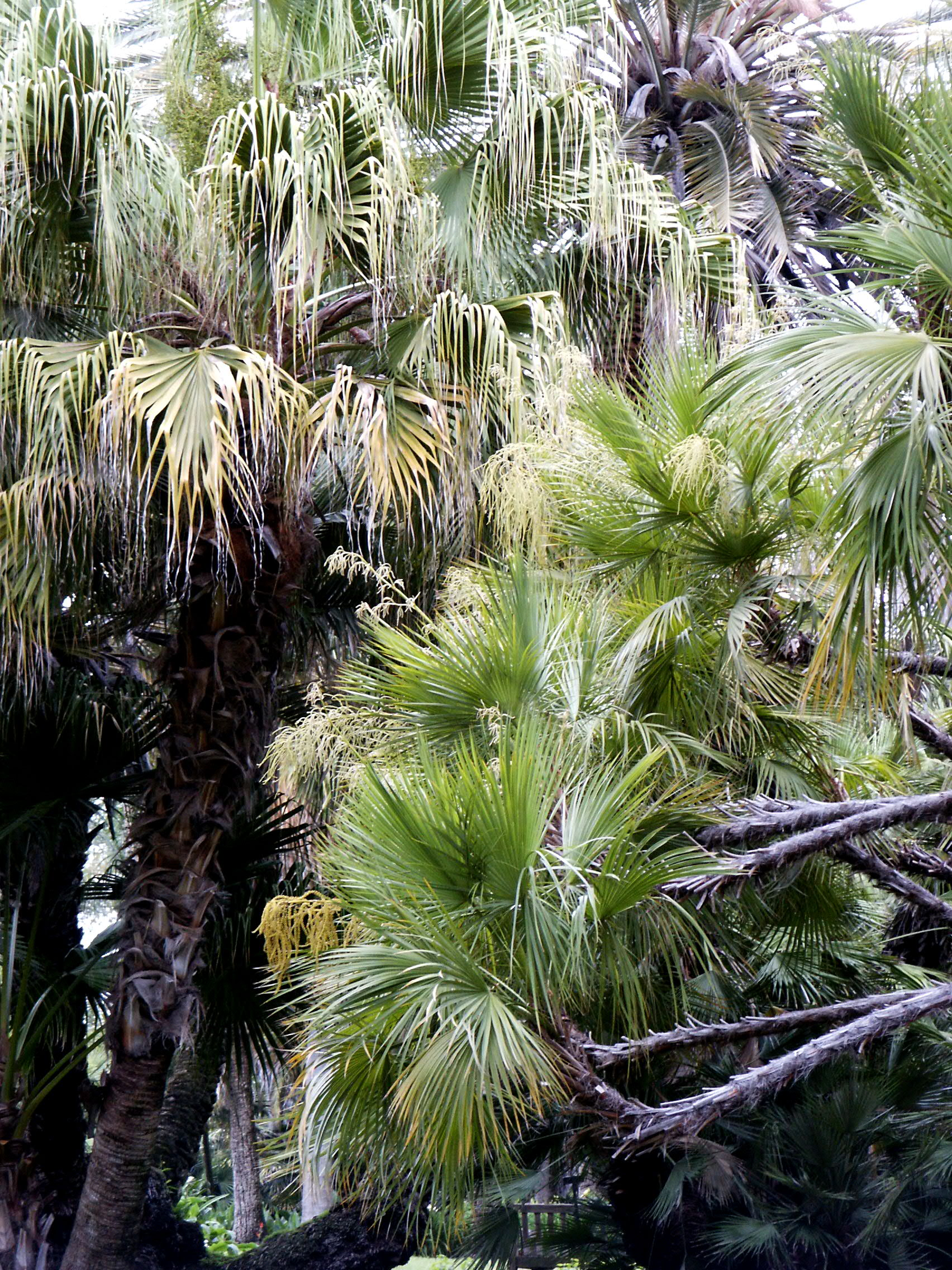
Livistona nitida

Livistona nitida, the Carnarvon Gorge cabbage palm, is a species of flowering plant in the family Arecaceae. It is endemic to Queensland in Australia.

== Etymology ==
Livistona: the generic name was given by Robert Brown to honor Patrick Murray, Baron of Livingston, who was largely responsible for establishing the botanical gardens in Edinburgh, Scotland. nitida: the specific epithet is from the Latin for shining, polished and refers to the shiny, glossy black seeds.

== Description ==
Livistona nitida has cream to yellow flowers, flowers from September to December, and fruits from November to March. It is a functionally dioecious palm, growing to 35 m, with raised leaf scars. The petioles of dead leaves persist for the first metre, but they shed higher up the stem. The inflorescences are unbranched at the base, and extend beyond the limit of the crown, branching up to 4 orders. The flowers are solitary or in clusters of 2-5 and have triangular sepals. The fruit is globose (diameter 13–20 mm) and a glossy black.

== Distribution ==
It is found In the catchments of the Dawson, Comet and Burnett Rivers, and Carnarvon Gorge in Queensland. It is abundant on the margins of streams and in flood plains, but is also found near sandstone cliffs and gorges.

== Taxonomy ==
Livistona nitida was first formally described by Tony Rodd in 1998. It had previously been known as Livistona sp. Carnarvon. L. nitida is the accepted name.
