= Garaynbal =

Aboriginal Australian people

The Garaynbal, also written Karingbal, are an Aboriginal Australian people of the state of Queensland. They spoke a dialect of Biri called Garaynbal, now extinct.

== Country ==
According to Norman Tindale, the Karingbal had around 2,800 square miles (7,300 km^{2}) of territory, around the headwaters of the Comet River and the upper Mackenzie River. They ran south from beneath Rolleston as far as the Carnarvon Range. Their western frontier lay at Consuelo Peak, while their eastern limits ran to Expedition Range and Bedourie.

== Social organisation ==
According to an early source, the tribe was divided into four exogamous intermarrying classes.

Male	Female
Bunyart	Bunyarrum
Thadbine	Thadbinun
Binjool	Binjoolun
Kiarra	Kiarrun

== Alternative names ==
- Karingbool
- Kaingbul
- Karranbal

== Sources ==
- Cameron, A. L. P. (22 March 1904). "On two Queensland tribes". Science of Man. 7 (2). Sydney: 27–29.
- McIntosh (1887). Curr, Edward Micklethwaite (ed.). The Australian race: its origin, languages, customs, place of landing in Australia and the routes by which it spread itself over the continent (PDF). Vol. 3. Melbourne: J. Ferres.
- Tindale, Norman (2015) [First published 1974]. "Karingbal (QLD)". Aboriginal Tribes of Australia. South Australian Museum.
