= Neil Turner Weir =

Weir in Queensland, Australia

- Location of the weir in Queensland
- Interactive map of Neil Turner Weir
- Country: Australia
- Location: Mitchell, south-west Queensland
- Coordinates: 26°28′17″S 147°57′31.2″E
- Purpose: Water supply
- Status: Operational
- Opening date: 1984
- Operator: SunWater

Dam and spillways
- Type of dam: Barrage
- Impounds: Maranoa River
- Spillway type: Uncontrolled cascade

Reservoir
- Total capacity: 2,000 ML (1,600 acre⋅ft)

The Neil Turner Weir is a small weir across the Maranoa River, in the town of Mitchell, in South West Queensland, Australia. The weir was built in 1984 and is a concrete-faced cascading structure, filled with sand. The weir is operated by SunWater. The resultant reservoir has a capacity of 2,000 megalitres (1,600 acre⋅ft) when full.

The weir was built predominantly to supply potable water for Mitchell and is also used for agricultural irrigation and regulates the flow of the river. The weir was named in honour of Neil Turner, a local politician and former Speaker of the Queensland Legislative Assembly.

A campsite exists, with public toilets, picnic tables and barbeque facilities. A little further west, five kilometres from Mitchell, on the banks of the river held back by the weir, is a fishing spot known as Fisherman's Rest.

== See also ==
- List of dams and reservoirs in Australia
