= Tony Rodd =

Australian botanist and photographer

Anthony Norman Rodd
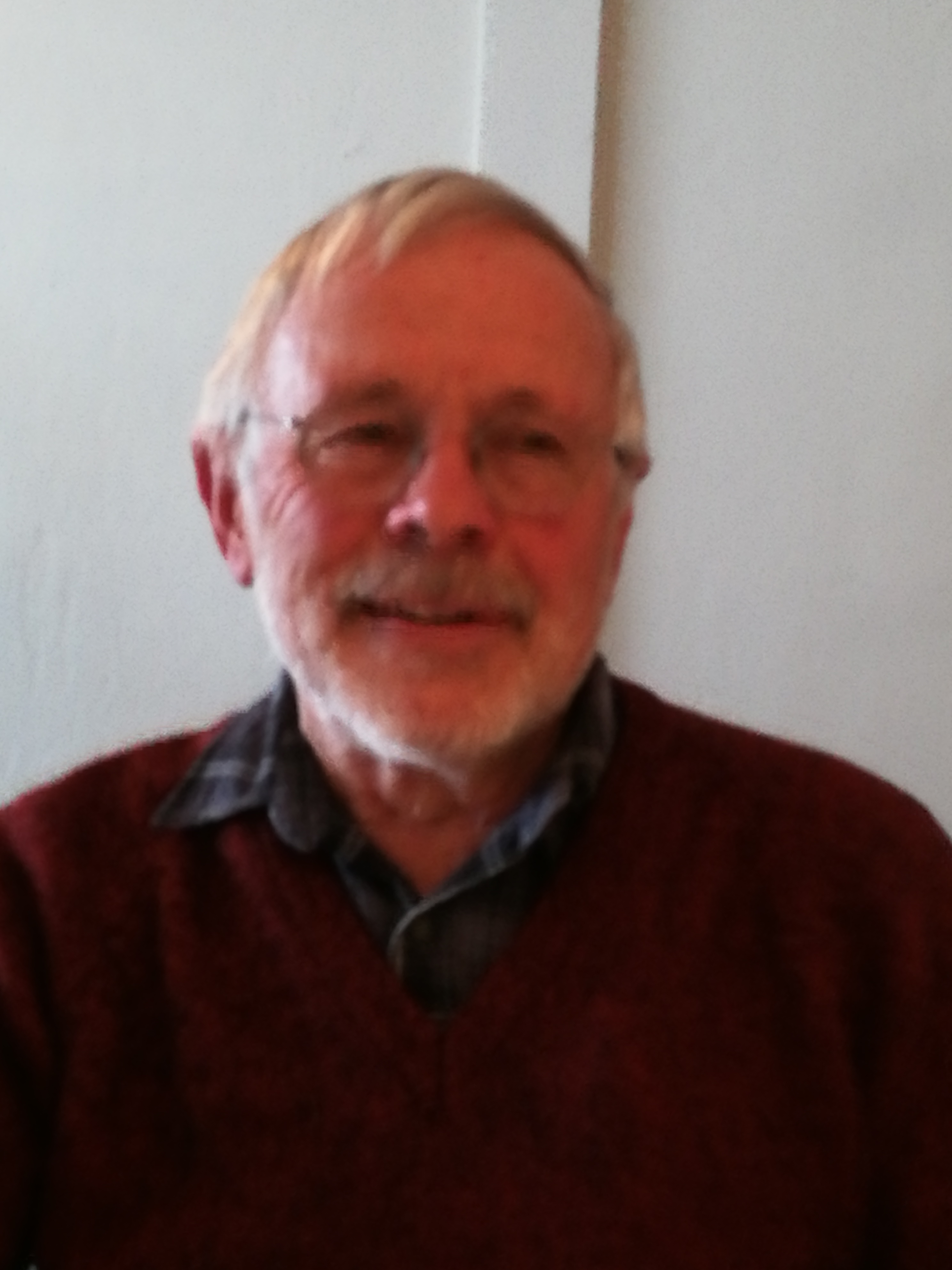
- Born: 1 January 1940 (age 86); Sydney
- Scientific career
- Fields: Botany
- Institutions: National Herbarium of New South Wales, Anne Clements & Associates
- Author abbrev. (botany): Rodd

Anthony Norman Rodd, known as Tony Rodd, (born 1940) is an Australian botanist.

== Names published ==
(incomplete list)

- Livistona fulva Rodd 1998. Revision of Livistona (Arecaceae) in Australia. Telopea 8(1): 103.
- Livistona kimberleyana Rodd 1998. Revision of Livistona (Arecaceae) in Australia. Telopea 8(1): 121.
- Livistona lanuginosa Rodd 1998. Revision of Livistona (Arecaceae) in Australia. Telopea 8(1): 82.
- Livistona mariae F.Muell. subsp. occidentalis Rodd 1998. Revision of Livistona (Arecaceae) in Australia. Telopea 8(1): 81.
- Livistona mariae F.Muell. subsp. rigida (Becc.) Rodd 1998. Revision of Livistona (Arecaceae) in Australia. Telopea 8(1): 80.
- Livistona nitida Rodd 1998. Revision of Livistona (Arecaceae) in Australia. Telopea 8(1): 96.

(These may not be accepted names.)

The standard author abbreviation Rodd is used to indicate this person as the author when citing a botanical name.

== Publications ==
(incomplete)

- Rodd, A.N. (1998) Revision of Livistona (Arecaceae) in Australia. Telopea, 8(1): 49-153.
- Harden, G.J. & Rodd, A.N. (1990) Rubus. In 'Flora of New South Wales.' (Ed. GJ Harden.) Vol. 1 pp. 531–535. (Royal Botanic Gardens: Sydney)
- Rodd, A.N. & Pickard, J. (1983) Census of vascular flora of Lord Howe Island. Cunninghamia 1, 267-280.
- Rodd, A.N. (1974) Checklist of angiosperms. Environmental Survey of Lord Howe Island, 21-26.
- Rodd, A.N. (1982) Salicaceae. in 'Flora of Australia', 8, 200-206.
- Rodd, A.N. (1971) Australian palms. Australian Natural History, 25, 21-26.
- Bryant, K. & Rodd, A.N. (2005). The ultimate plant book. CSIRO Publishing.
- Rodd, A.N. (1996) The Ultimate Book of Trees & Shrubs for Australian Gardens. Random House Australia.
- Blombery, A.M. & Rodd, A.N. (1988) An Informative, practical guide to palms of the world: their cultivation, care and landscape use. Ed. Angus & Robertson. 201 pp.
- Mann, R. & Rodd, A.N. (1996) Ultimate Book of Trees and Shrubs. Ed. Random House Australia. 512 pp. ISBN 0091832055
- Cundall, P. & Rodd, A.N. (2006) Flora's gardening cards: perfect portable home reference for every gardener. Ed. ABC Books. 264 pp. ISBN 0733316107
- Rodd, A.N. (2006) Flora's Trees and Shrubs: Illustrated A-Z of Over 8500 Plants. Gardening Australia Series. Ed. ABC Books. 928 pp. ISBN 0733316913
- Rodd, A.N. (2007) Flora's Plantfinder: The Right Plants for Every Garden. Gardening Australia Series. Ed. ABC Books. 992 pp. ISBN 0733320945
- Rodd, A.N. & Stackhouse, J. (2008) Trees: The Macmillan Visual Guide. Ed. Pan Macmillan. 304 pp. ISBN 1405038470, ISBN 9781405038478
- Leo Meier; Penny Figgis; J. G. Mosley; Tim F. Flannery; Tony Rodd (1988), Australia's wilderness heritage, Sydney, Chicago: Weldon Pub. in association with Australian Conservation Foundation, ISBN 9780947116545
- Alec Blombery; Tony Rodd (1992), An Informative, Practical Guide to Palms of the World. Their Cultivation, Care & Landscape Use, Sydney: Angus & Robertson
- Tony Rodd (Hrsg.) (2001), Firefly Encyclopedia of Trees and Shrubs. Illustrated A-Z of Over 7000 Plants, Firefly Books, ISBN 9781554072651
- Geoff Bryant; Tony Rodd (2007), The Plant Finder. The Right Plants for Every Garden, Firefly Books Limited, ISBN 9781554072651

=== Translations of works ===
==== German ====
- Tony Rodd; Jennifer Stackhouse (2008), Bäume, München : blv, ISBN 9781405038478

==== French ====
- Tony Rodd & Jennifer Stackhouse, (2009). Les arbres, Toulouse, Milan, DL. (304 p.)

== Honours ==
=== Eponymous species ===
- (Araliaceae) Astrotricha roddii Makinson
- (Rubiaceae) Galium roddii Ehrend. & McGill.

(both names accepted)
