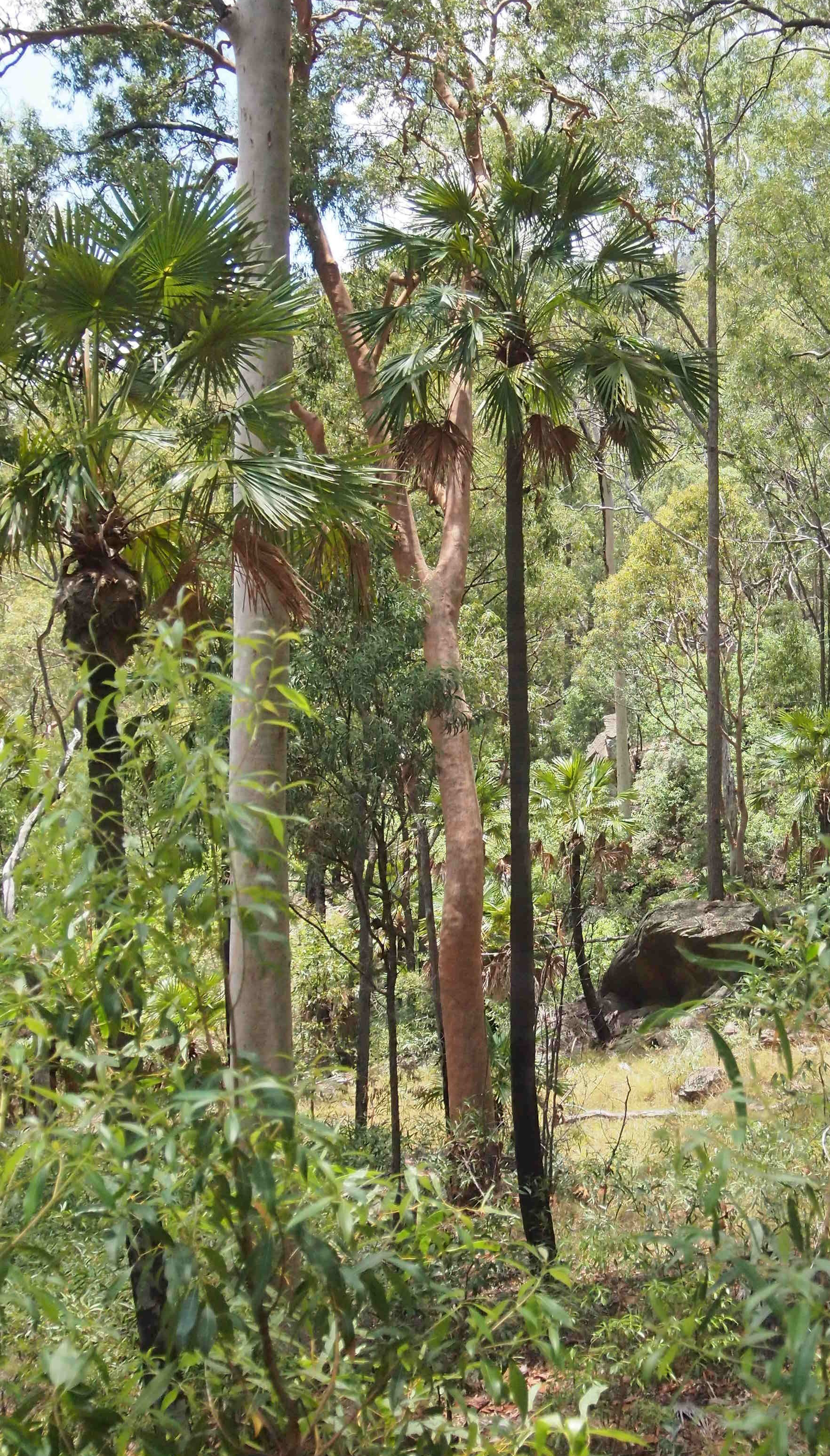

Scientific classification
- Kingdom: Plantae
- Clade: Tracheophytes
- Clade: Angiosperms
- Clade: Monocots
- Clade: Commelinids
- Order: Arecales
- Family: Arecaceae
- Tribe: Trachycarpeae
- Genus: Livistona
- Species: L. fulva

Binomial name
- Livistona fulva Rodd

= Livistona fulva =

Species of palm

Livistona fulva is a palm species, restricted in distribution to the Blackdown Tablelands in central Queensland, Australia. Livistona fulva is a tall solitary palm. In nature, it grows in open forests; in cultivation. it prefers a warm temperate climate and sunny position.
