= Carnarvon Gorge =

Gorge in Central Queensland, Australia

Coordinates: 25°01′54.58″S 148°11′00.02″E

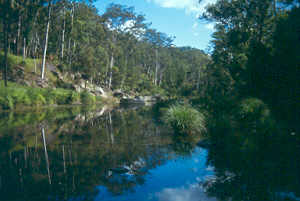
Carnarvon Gorge, looking upstream from Crossing 5

Carnarvon Gorge is located in the Southern Brigalow Belt bioregion in Central Queensland (Australia), 593 km northwest of Brisbane. Primarily created by water erosion, Carnarvon Gorge is around 30 kilometres long, located in Carnarvon National Park, and six hundred metres deep at the mouth. It is the most visited feature within Carnarvon National Park due to the diversity of experiences it contains and the ease with which it can be accessed. The closest towns are Injune and Rolleston.

In 2009 as part of the Q150 celebrations, the Carnarvon Gorge was announced as one of the Q150 Icons of Queensland for its role as a "Natural attraction".

== History ==
Some western researchers have suggested that Aboriginal people did not live in the gorge permanently, due to defensive concerns and lack of food resources, whilst others suggest that permanent occupation was not allowed due to the gorge being considered sacred. The dreamtime stories tell a tale of the Rainbow Serpent which made the gorges, and which resides in their permanent waterholes to this day.

Ludwig Leichhardt was the first European explorer to pass nearby and make note of the ranges, during his expedition to Port Essington in 1844. Two years later, Thomas Mitchell passed to the west of Carnarvon Gorge. It was Mitchell who named the Carnarvon Range, possibly after Henry Herbert, 3rd Earl of Carnarvon. The reports of pastureland and good water carried back to the colonies brought settlers to the area, and began a period of bloody conflict between settlers and Aboriginals.

By the late 1870s the newcomers had prevailed. Local Aboriginals sought refuge on properties run by those sympathetic to their plight. Subsequent years would see many forcibly removed from their homelands and transferred to government and church run reserves and missions. The latter process of removal is considered by some to have been, culturally, more destructive than the direct conflict that preceded it.

The farming of cattle and growing of crops remains a vibrant industry around Carnarvon Gorge but, since 1932 when it was gazetted as a National Park, such activities have no longer been allowed in the gorge itself. In 1974, the Ka Ka Mundi area which had been heavily grazed for about a century, also became part of the park. In place of the grazing of cattle, a tourism industry has grown. Over 70,000 visitors per annum make the trek to Carnarvon Gorge.

== Features ==
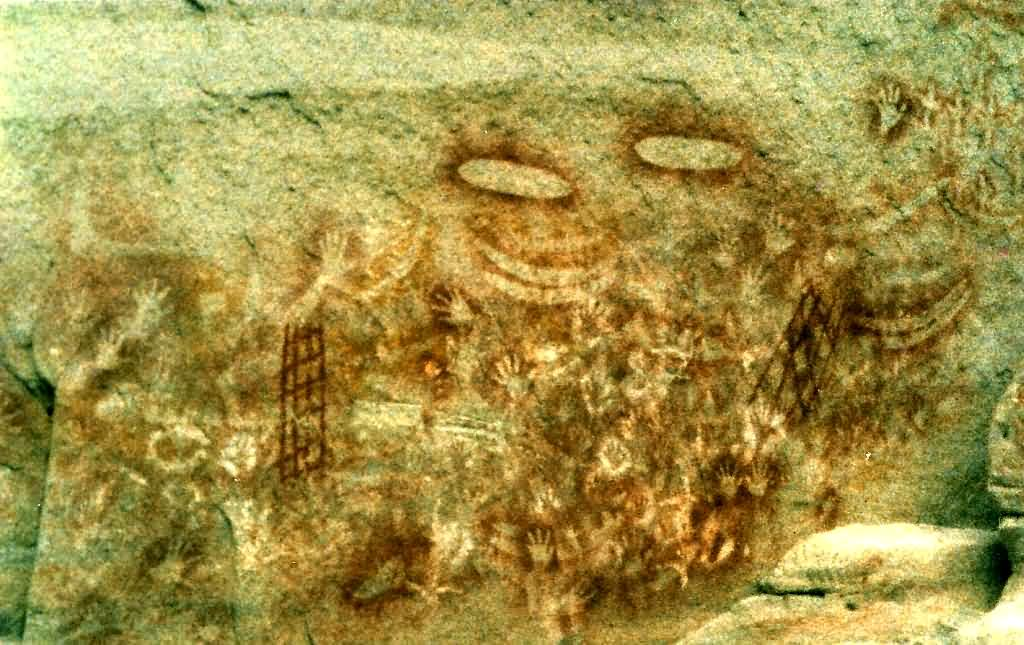
Stencil art at the Art Gallery, an excellent example of Aboriginal rock art.

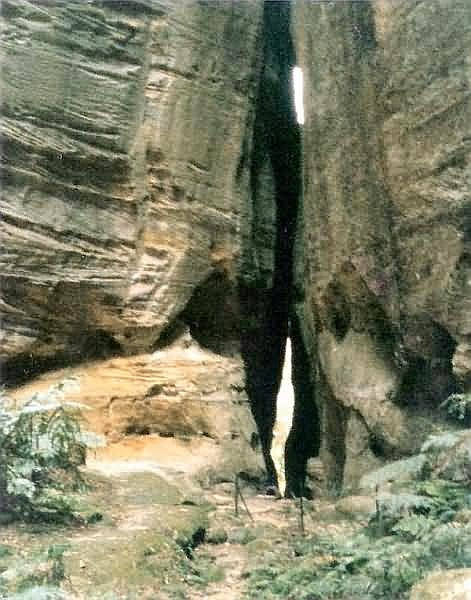
Entrance to the Amphitheatre

Within the lower ten kilometres of the Gorge, visitors can encounter a variety of cultural and natural values that, elsewhere in the region, would require considerable travel to experience; significant Indigenous cultural sites and rock art sites, narrow sandstone canyons, extensive sandstone cliff lines, basalt-capped tablelands and mountain ranges, and relict rainforest vegetation.

=== Tracks, trails, and sites ===
There is a ten kilometre (10 km) track leading into Carnarvon Gorge, with diversions into specific sites such as the Art Gallery, Big Bend, Wards Canyon, Cathedral Cave, the Amphitheatre and the Moss Garden. In the mouth of Carnarvon Gorge, there are another five sites to visit; Boolimba Bluff, the Nature Trail, the Rockpool, Mickey Creek Gorge and Baloon Cave (closed due to bushfire damage in December, 2018). Several remote tracks exist for experienced walkers; the Ranch, the Devil's Signpost, and Battleship Spur.

=== Rocks and landscapes ===
Situated within the Central Queensland Sandstone Belt, and separating the Consuelo Tableland and the Great Dividing Range, Carnarvon Gorge's landscapes have largely been shaped by water erosion. Over the last twenty seven million years Carnarvon Creek, which winds for over 30 kilometres (19 mi), has carved down through six hundred metres of stone, exposing rocks from three significant phases of Queensland's geological history including two sedimentary basins, the Bowen and the Surat, and the Buckland Volcanic Province. The youngest rocks in the area are the igneous basalt rocks of the Buckland volcanic Province which were laid down between 35 and 27 million years ago to depths of up to 300 metres. The basalt layer is present on top of the high country either side of the Gorge where it protects the landscape from erosion and generates significantly different soils to those derived from the lower sedimentary rocks. Boulders eroded from the basalt layer dominate the Gorge's waterways due to their ability to resist water erosion better than the sedimentary rocks they once overlaid.

The most visible rocks in the Gorge belong to the Surat Basin, which holds most of Queensland's gas and oil and significant amounts of groundwater. The Surat Basin forms part of the Great Artesian Basin, and generates numerous springs within the Gorge. The oldest component in the Surat Basin is the porous Precipice Sandstone, which forms the Gorge's spectacular cliffs. The Precipice Sandstone is one of the primary intake beds for the Great Artesian Basin, giving the area where it lies exposed significance as a replenishment zone.

Below the Precipice Sandstone, the Gorge's floor is formed by the uppermost layer of the Bowen Basin, the Moolayember Formation. The impermeability of this layer allows the water generated by Carnarvon Gorge's springs to remain close to, or above, the surface - a significant interplay in terms of the availability of water within the Gorge's ecosystems. Carnarvon Creek, whose flow has only been known to stop twice since records commenced, is an incredibly reliable source of water. In times of drought, it turns the Gorge into an oasis which has supported forms of life long since passed from the semi-arid ecosystems surrounding it.

Each of the rock strata exposed in the Gorge erodes and weathers according to its own characteristics, and the variety of soil types and landforms generated goes a long way towards explaining why Carnarvon Gorge supports such a diversity of life.

== Climate ==
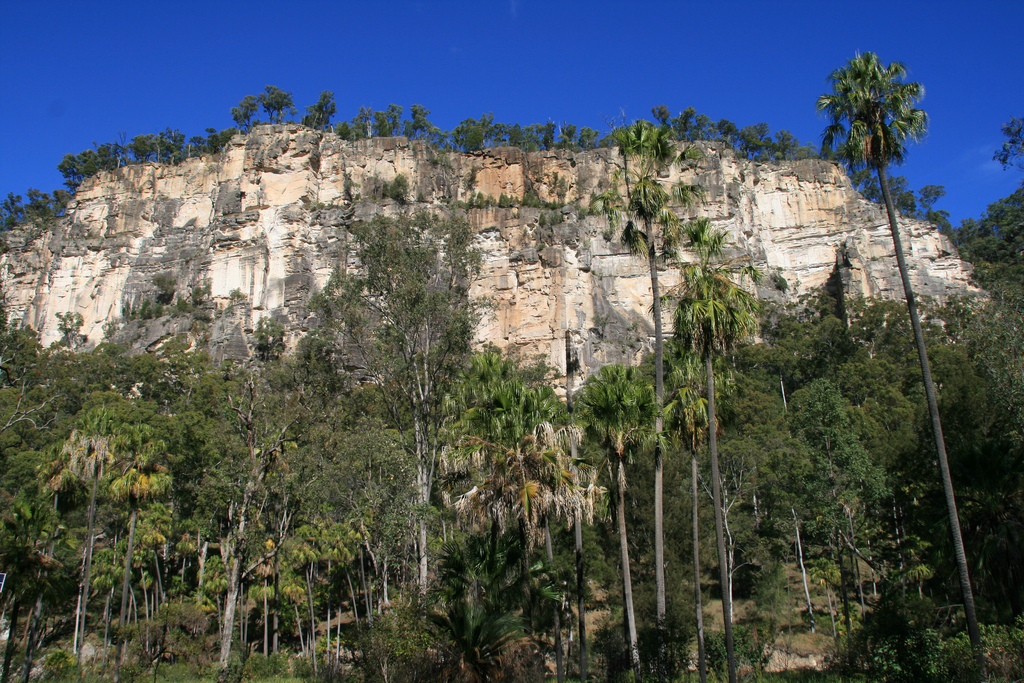
Hill in Carnarvon National Park

Carnarvon Gorge's climate is considerably different from that experienced in the flatter terrain surrounding it. Average rainfall in the Gorge is higher at 1,000 millimetres per annum and temperatures on the Gorge floor are more moderate. The lowest temperature recorded in the Gorge is -2 °C, whereas temperatures lower than -5 °C are experienced within 5 kilometres of its mouth. Average July temperature range is 6.3 °C – 20.9 °C, and average January temperature range is 20.5 °C – 35.5 °C. Statistically, the wettest month is February and the driest is August.

These figures should always be considered in the context of Australia's notoriously unpredictable climate. For example, between October 2007 and February 2008, Carnarvon Gorge received 1,400 millimetres of rainfall; 140% of its annual average.

== Flora ==
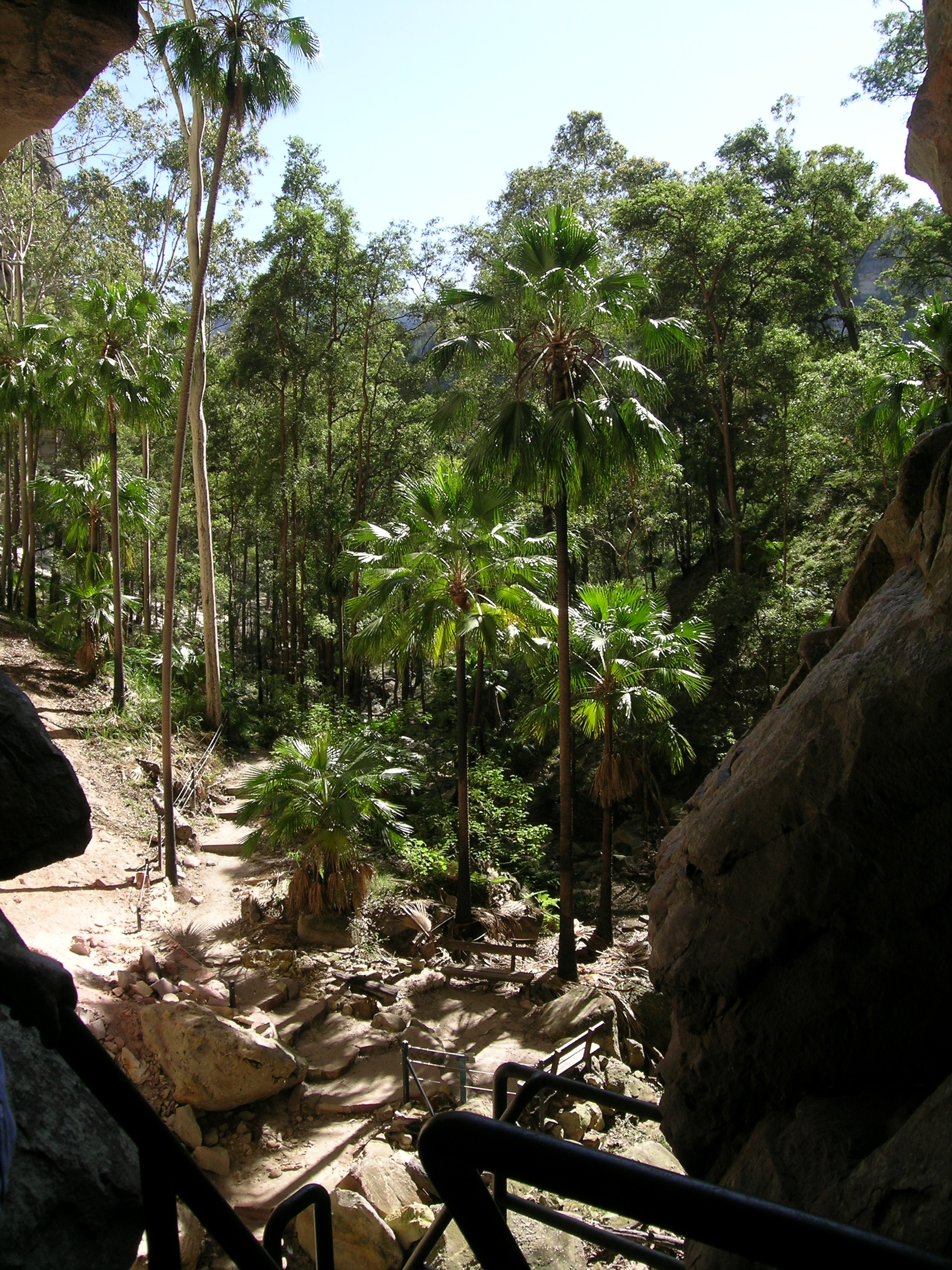
Livistona nitida, the carnarvon fan palm, as seen from the Amphitheatre.

Three broad vegetation types are present in Carnarvon Gorge; eucalypt and angophora dominated woodland to open woodland; mixed eucalypt, acacia, white cypress pine or turpentine woodlands and/or open forests on sandstone slopes, scarps, ridges and residuals; cleared and/or regrowth areas. Four regional ecosystems listed as of concern are easily encountered by visitors to Carnarvon Gorge: Queensland blue gum woodland on alluvial plains; silver-leaved ironbark woodland on alluvial plains; Queensland blue gum, river she-oak fringing woodland on alluvial plains; and tall open forest in sheltered gorges and moist habitats.

Two plant species, in particular, are considered Carnarvon Gorge icons; the cycad Macrozamia moorei (no common name) and the Carnarvon fan palm (Livistona nitida). Macrozamia moorei is closely associated with the Tertiary basalt flows of the Buckland Volcanic Province, and is endemic to Central Queensland. Livistona nitida is endemic to the springs and waterways of the Dawson River catchment, and Carnarvon Gorge is considered its stronghold.

Several plants occur in disjunct populations, or approach the limits of their distribution, within Carnarvon Gorge such as the isolated colony of king ferns (Angiopteris evecta) found in Wards Canyon and the stately Sydney blue gum (Eucalyptus saligna) found in the Gorge's wettest habitats.

== Fauna ==
=== Mammals ===
Carnarvon Gorge has a rich mammalian fauna including Australia's two monotremes, the platypus (Ornithorhyncus anatinus) and the echidna (Tachyglossus aculeatus). Macropod species include the eastern grey kangaroo (Macropus giganteus), the pretty-faced wallaby (Macropus parryi), the swamp wallaby (Wallabia bicolor), the wallaroo or euro (Macropus robustus), the red-necked wallaby, (Macropus rufogriseus), and the rufous bettong (Aepyprymnus rufescens).

==== Gliders ====
Five of Australia's seven species of glider occur here; the greater glider (Petauroides volans), the yellow-bellied glider (Petaurus australis), the squirrel glider (Petaurus norfolcensis), the sugar glider (Petaurus breviceps), and the feathertail glider (Acrobates pygmaeus).

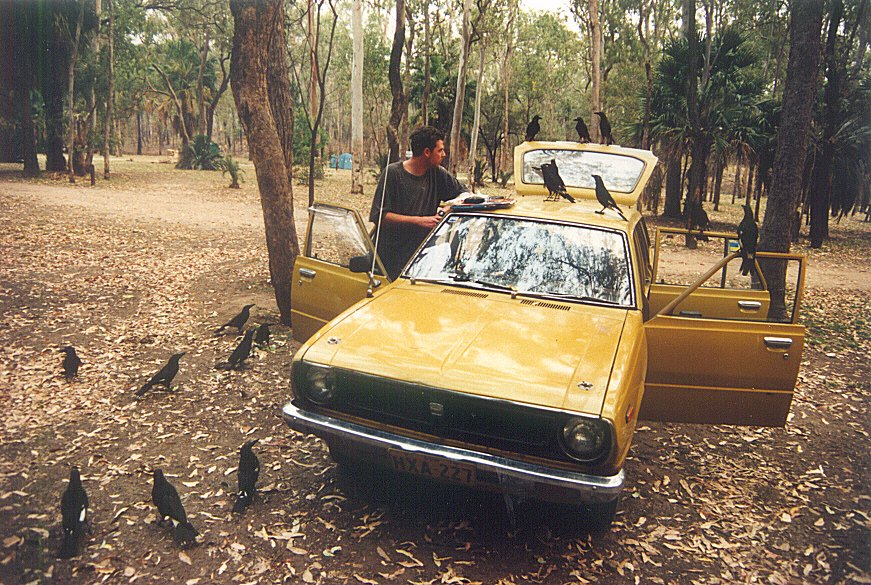
Aggressive pied currawongs have come to expect food due to previous hand-feeding

Over 180 species of bird have been recorded within the Gorge, from the tiny weebill (Smicrornis brevirostris) to the wedge-tailed eagle (Aquila audax). Some of the Gorge's birds have become habituated to humans, due to hand-feeding which is against Park regulations. This situation is of concern to Park rangers as it allows opportunistic species, such as the laughing kookaburra (Dacelo novaeguineae) and the pied currawong (Strepera graculina), to develop population sizes that are abnormally large. When visitation (and therefore hand-feeding) tapers off over the summer low tourism season the abnormal populations place abnormal pressure on the species' natural food sources which can include the young of other bird species.

Australian bustards (Ardeotis australis) are frequently seen in farmland on approach to the Gorge, along with brolgas if the weather has been wet. Communally breeding birds, such as the white-winged chough, the laughing kookaburra (Dacelo novaeguineae), and the apostlebird (Struthidea cinerea), are a feature of the ecosystems around the entrance to Carnarvon Gorge.

Peregrine falcons (Falco peregrinus) and wedge-tailed eagles patrol the cliffs further into the Gorge whilst, below, numerous parrots and honeyeaters forage amongst the eucalypt canopy. Closer to ground level, visitors are likely to encounter the Australian raven (Corvus coronoides) and the pied currawong (Strepera graculina) anywhere they stop to eat. Along the walking tracks many smaller species will be present in the ground cover and understory including red-browed finches (Neochmia temporalis), white-browed scrubwrens (Sericornis frontalis), and several species of thornbill.

=== Reptiles and amphibians ===
Over 90 species of reptile and 22 species of frog are known to inhabit the National Park. The most commonly encountered snakes in the Gorge are the keelback (Tropidonophis mairii), the green tree snake (Dendrelaphis punctulata) and the carpet python (Morelia spilota). The largest lizards in the Gorge are the lace monitor (Varanus varius) and the sand monitor (Varanus gouldii). Of the wide variety of skinks, the largest is the major skink (Egernia major) which occurs in a disjunct population.

The most frequently encountered of the Gorge's frogs are the tusked frog (Adelotus brevis), the striped marsh frog (Limnodynastes peronii), and the cane toad (Bufo Marinus). The introduced cane toad is currently implicated in the local disappearance of the northern quoll, once thought extinct all over QLD, a small population was established not long ago after 30 years of not one sighting of this critter, was found on a spotting job(Dasyurus Hallucatus). freshwater turtles such as Kreffts river turtle (Emydura krefftii) and the saw-shelled turtle (wollumbinia latisternum) are in strong numbers in Carnarvon Creek, commonly seen sunning themselves on rocks and logs during the middle of the day.

=== Invertebrates ===
The National Park's invertebrate species are extremely diverse. Several species of insect have their entire distribution within the Park's boundaries, and are joined in this category by at least four species of land snail. Butterflies are a feature of Carnarvon Gorge's fauna. Large aggregations of common crow (Euploea core) butterflies can occur in Carnarvon's cool, moist side gorges when the animals gather to overwinter.

Carnarvon Creek is also home to large numbers of invertebrates, many of which are the larval stages of winged insects such as dragonflies. Visitors to Wards Canyon have the opportunity to observe these creatures easily in the clear, shallow, spring-fed stream.

== Services and facilities ==
Queensland Parks & Wildlife Service has a base at Carnarvon Gorge attached to the National Park Visitor Centre. The Visitor Centre is open 8am to 4pm every day and offers free wifi. The Carnarvon Gorge Day Use Area has picnic tables and toilet facilities and parking facilities for cars, motorhomes, and caravans. The Carnarvon Gorge Camping Area only opens during the Easter, Winter and Spring Queensland School Holiday Periods. The Big Bend Camping Area is open year-round.

A variety of accommodation options are available including cabins, caravan and motorhome sites and camping. Commercial tours of the gorge are available.

== See also ==
- Bunya Mountains
- List of canyons
