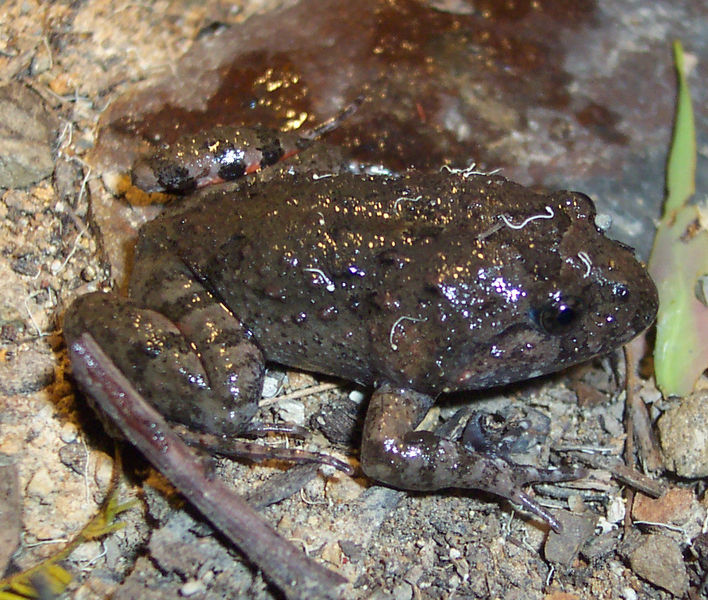
- Male
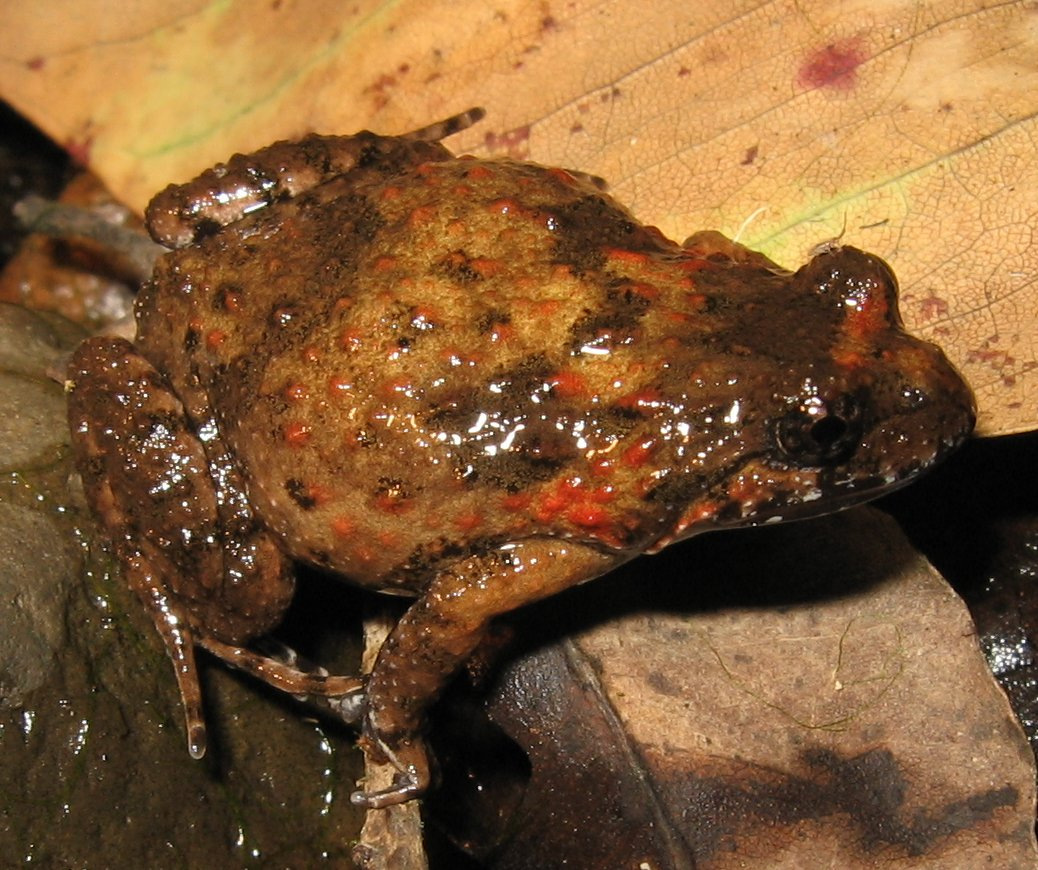
- Female

Conservation status
- Near Threatened (IUCN 3.1)

Scientific classification
- Kingdom: Animalia
- Phylum: Chordata
- Class: Amphibia
- Order: Anura
- Family: Limnodynastidae
- Genus: Adelotus; Ogilby, 1907
- Species: A. brevis

Binomial name
- Adelotus brevis (Günther, 1863)
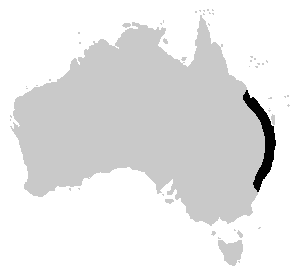
- Range of the tusked frog

= Tusked frog =

Species of amphibian

The tusked frog (Adelotus brevis) is a species of ground-dwelling frog native to eastern Australia from Eungella National Park, Queensland south to Ourimbah, New South Wales. It is the only species in the genus Adelotus - adelotus meaning "unseen" and brevis meaning "short".

== Description ==
The tusked frog is a unique frog within Australia, as it is the only species where the female is smaller than male. Males can reach a maximum length of about 5 centimetres (2.0 in), while females reach 4 centimetres (1.6 in). The common name of "tusked frog" derives from the small protrusions on the lower jaw, similar in position to tusks, which can reach about 5 millimetres (0.20 in) in length in males (only visible when the mouth is open).

The pair of bony tusks are modified teeth that protrude from the middle of the lower jaw and fit into special grooves on the upper jaw when the mouth is closed. They are slightly curved and sharply pointed, and are present in both males and females, although they are larger in males.

Males have been observed 'locking jaws' with each other, in a similar way to male deer locking antlers in the struggle to exert dominance over each other. Male tusked frogs have a disproportionally large-sized head, compared to the body, and females have a smaller proportioned sized head than males. The males have been known to fight, biting each other under the head, and around the neck. This behaviour has presumably led to the sexual dimorphism of larger heads, body size and tusks to increase success of fights (Katsirakos & Shine 1997).

The dorsal surface of the frog is normally brown, but can be olive to black, with low ridges, warts and irregular darker markings. There is usually a butterfly shaped marking between the eyes. The [ventral] surface of this species is more striking - being marbled black and white with flashes of red on the groin and hind legs. Males and females have different belly patterns. Fingers and toes are cylindrical and are not webbed.

== Ecology and behaviour ==
A. brevis is associated with dams, ditches, flooded grassland and creeks in rainforest, wet sclerophyll forest and woodland. It is known from coastal and highland areas, however it has suffered declines in many highland areas, particularly the New England Tablelands of New South Wales.

Males create hidden nest sites in leaf litter and vegetation in streams and the edges of dams. This species has a call like "tok-tok", males call from the nest site and can be difficult to find. Breeding takes place in spring and summer and eggs are laid as a foamy mass in the nest, hidden from sunlight. The eggs are white in colour and lack pigment.

In the breeding season (October - December), males build nests out of foam hidden from direct sunlight in ponds and swamps. Over 600 eggs may be laid in each floating mass of foam, and are guarded by the male until they hatch into tadpoles. The tadpoles grow over a period of two to three months to around 3 to 3.5 cm, when they undergo metamorphosis into 'mini adult' froglets.

== Conservation status and threats ==
The IUCN has listed the tusked frog in the near threatened category of the Red List of Threatened Species, and notes that it is probably in significant decline due to chytridiomycosis.

The Southern Tablelands population has been listed as an endangered population under the Threatened Species Conservation Act, following the disappearance of the species from the rest of its former Tablelands range.

Urban and agricultural development are thought to be the primary threats to this species, causing the degradation and loss of its habitat. Introduced species are causing further decline, such as the predatory eastern mosquitofish (Gambusia holbrooki), and weed species which outcompete the tusked frog's natural vegetation.

== Gallery ==
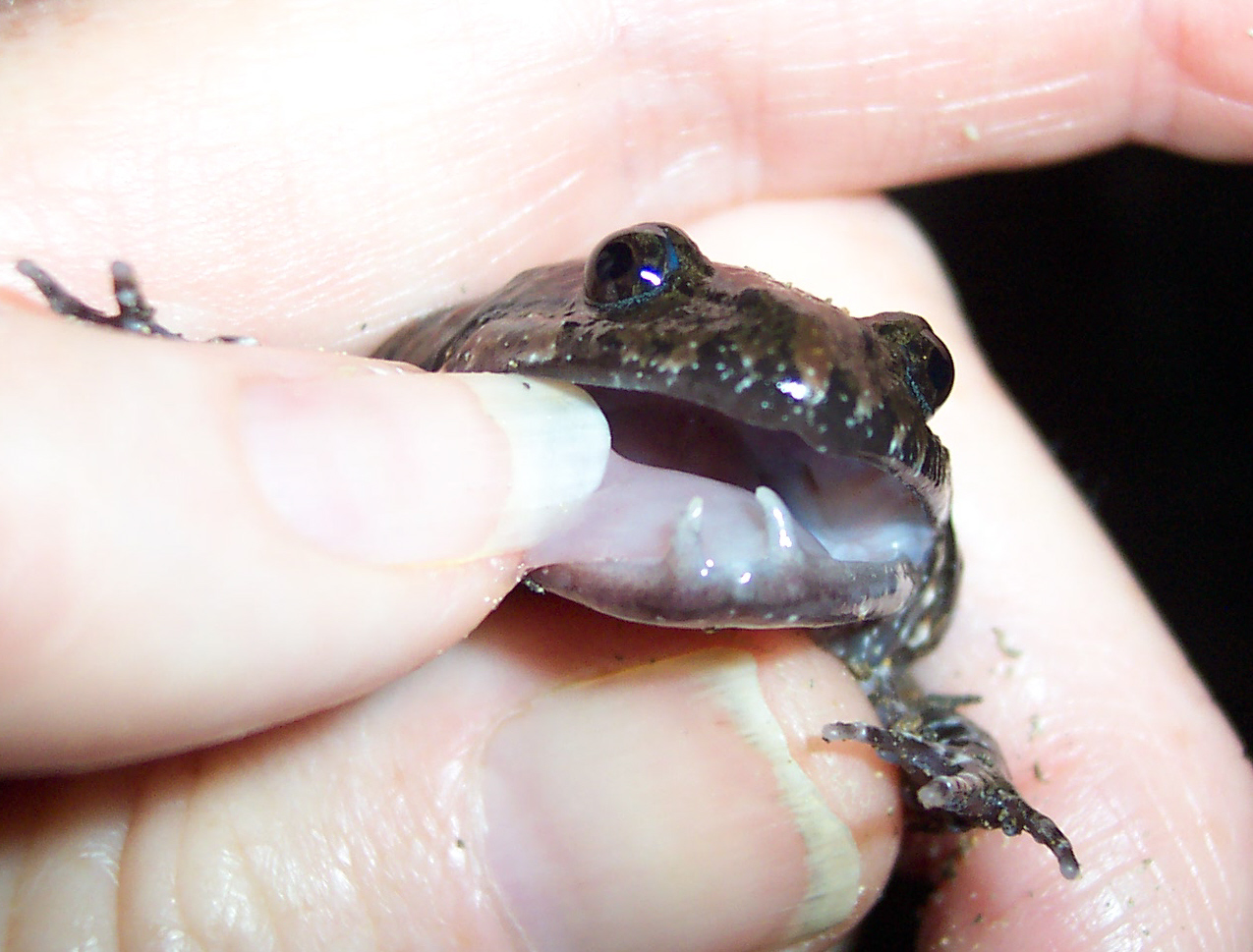
Tusks of a male tusked frog

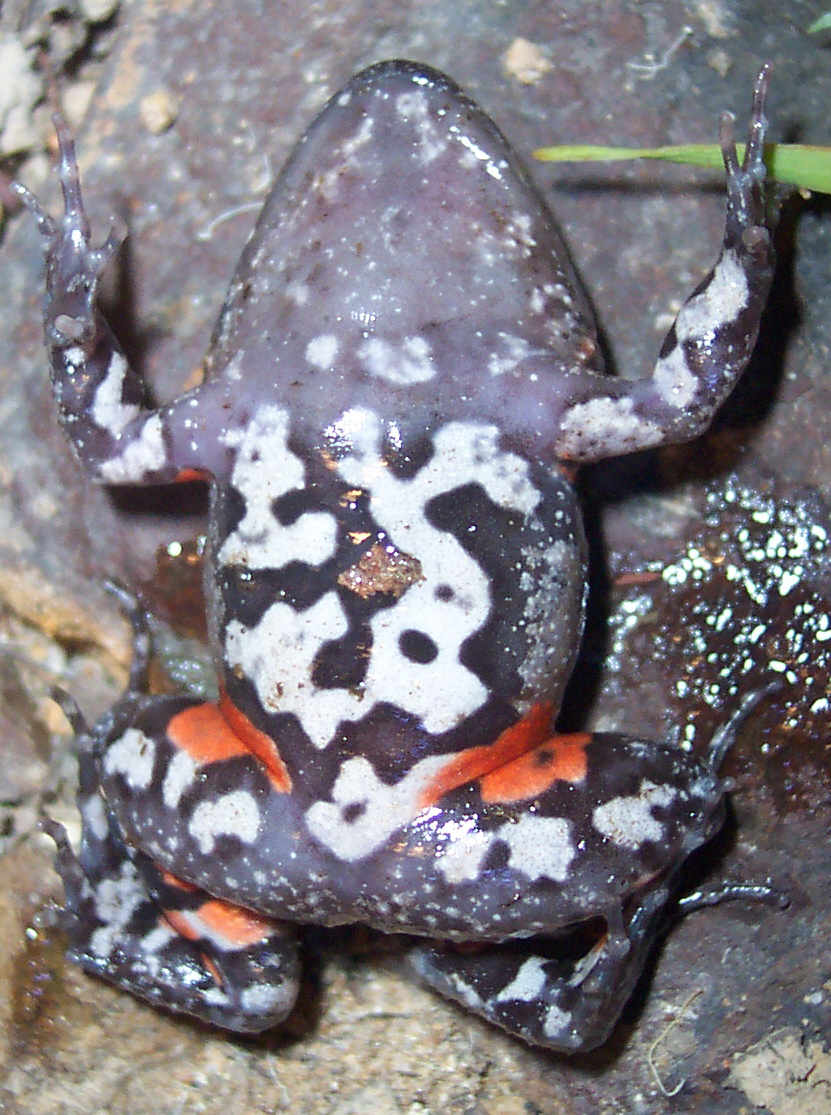
The ventral surface of the tusked frog

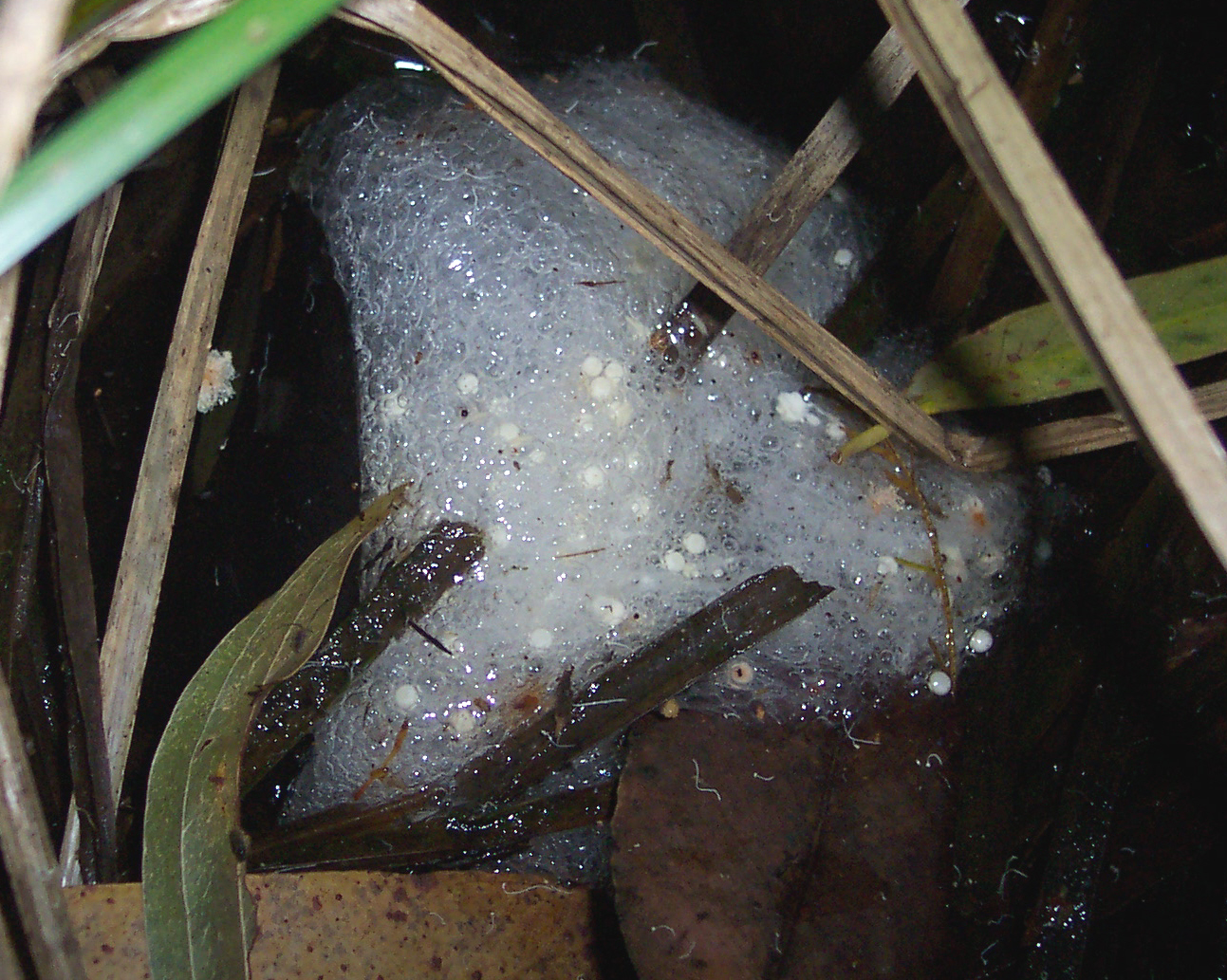
Spawn of the tusked frog; note the unpigmented eggs

recording of the Tusked Frog (Adelotus brevis)
