= Carnarvon National Park =

National park in Queensland, Australia

- IUCN category II (national park)
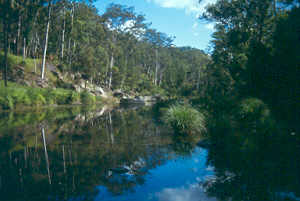
- Carnarvon Creek and Gorge

- Location within Queensland
- Location: Queensland
- Nearest city: Rolleston; Injune
- Coordinates: 24°38′09″S 147°59′50″E
- Area: 2,980 km^{2} (1,150 sq mi)
- Established: 28 April 1932
- Visitors: Approx. 65,000
- Governing body: Queensland Parks and Wildlife Service
- Website: https://parks.desi.qld.gov.au/parks/carnarvon-gorge

Carnarvon National Park is located in the Southern Brigalow Belt bioregion in the Maranoa Region in Central Queensland, Australia. The park is 593 km northwest of Brisbane. It began life as a 26,304-hectare (65,000-acre) reserve gazetted in 1932 to protect Carnarvon Gorge for its outstanding scenic values, its Indigenous and non-Indigenous cultural heritage, and its geological significance.

== Rocks and landscapes ==
Situated within the Central Queensland Sandstone Belt, and straddling the Great Dividing Range, Carnarvon National Park preserves and presents significant elements of Queensland's geological history including two sedimentary basins, the Bowen and the Surat, and the Buckland Volcanic Province. The youngest rocks in the area are the igneous basalt rocks of the Buckland volcanic Province, which were laid down between 35 and 27 million years ago. Since that time, water and wind have eroded the park's landscapes into a network of sandy plains, valleys, and gorges separated by basalt-capped tablelands and ranges.

The park is rich in groundwater, multiple springs. The elevated areas protected within Carnarvon National Park have high value for above-ground catchments as well. Five major river systems rise within the park's boundary: the Comet, Dawson, Maranoa, Nogoa, and Warrego. The Warrego and Maranoa lie inland of the Great Dividing Range on the northern boundary of the Murray-Darling Basin.

== Flora ==
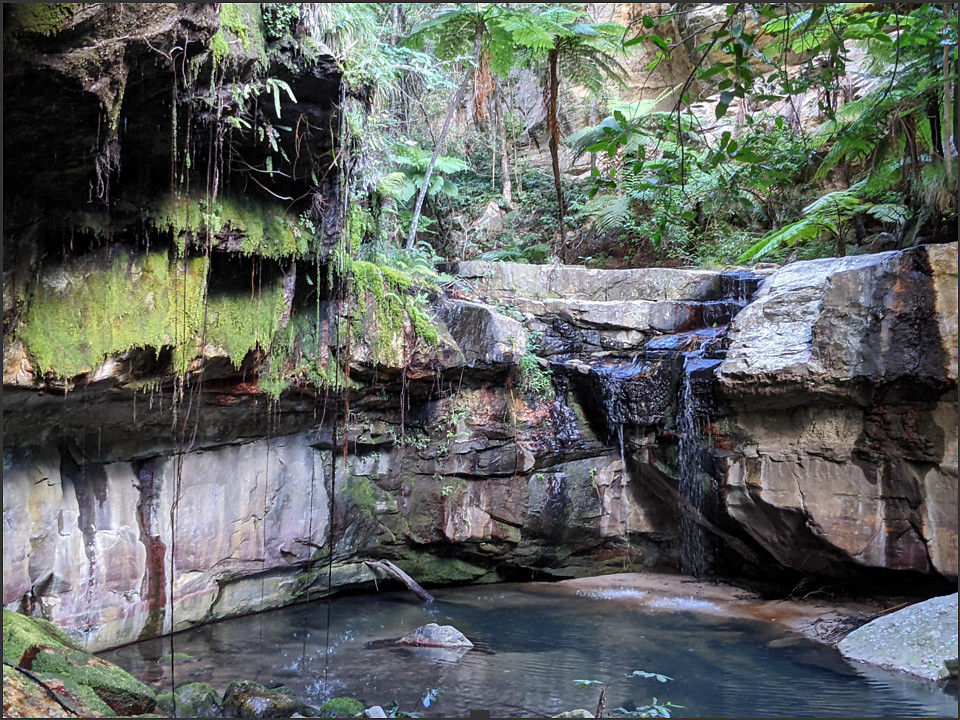
Moss Garden, 2022

Forty regional ecosystems are known to exist within the park and nine of them are listed as endangered, due to large-scale land clearing within the region. Twenty-three species of flora listed as rare and threatened (Under Queensland legislation) have been found in the park, including the iconic Livistona nitida (Carnarvon Fan Palm, Carnarvon Gorge section), Cadellia pentastylis (Ooline, Moolayember section), and Stemmacantha australis (Austral Cornflower, Mount Moffatt section).

Several plants occur in disjunct populations, or reach the limits of their distribution, within the Park such as the isolated colony of Angiopteris evecta (King Fern) found in Wards Canyon, Carnarvon Gorge. Artesian springs in the Salvator Rosa section of the park are considered amongst the most biodiverse in the state.

== Fauna ==
Over 210 bird species have been recorded within Carnarvon National Park, along with about 60 species of mammals. This park is particularly rich in species of bats with at least twenty known to be there. The Ornithorhyncus anatinus, the platypus, is at its western limit of habitation in Queensland within this National Park, along with most of the park's gliding possums. Carnarvon Gorge has commercial night tours that take visitors into the park in search of gliders and other nocturnal life.

At least 90 species of reptiles call this park home, over half of which are either skinks or geckoes, and 35 species have their State distributional limits here. Twenty-two species of amphibians have been found in the park, including isolated populations of Litoria fallax (eastern Sedgefrog) and Adelotus brevis (Tusked Frog).

Over ten species of fish inhabit the park's waterways, the largest of which is Anguilla reinhardtii (long-finned eel). The park's invertebrate fauna is thought to be extremely diverse, and at least nine species are considered to be endemic to the Carnarvon Range, including two species of dragonfly, two species of stonefly, a dobson fly, and four species of land snail.

Feral animals are present within the National Park, the ones presenting the most serious problems being brumbies and pigs. In 2007, culling of both species began by riflemen in helicopters or airplanes. In 2008 the third phase of an aerial culling of Brumbies took place, by shooting 700 horses from a helicopter, in Carnarvon National Park. Such aerial culling is a contentious issue to some members of the public. However, there is little doubt that both species cause considerable alteration to the values the park is designed to protect. Through their grazing and their repetitious patterns of movement, feral horses alter the composition of the ground cover, and this can accelerate erosion through over-grazing and excessive hoof traffic. Feral pigs are thought to be responsible for the localised extinction of the Australian brush-turkey from some areas of this National Park.

== History ==
Carnarvon National Park has grown significantly since its inception, and Carnarvon Gorge is now but one of its seven sections.

- Goodlife
- Salvator Rosa
- Ka Ka Mundi
- Buckland Tableland
- Mount Moffatt
- Carnarvon Gorge
- Moolayember

In expanding the National Park, the Queensland National Parks and Wildlife Service have sought to enhance the reserves catchment value and increase the diversity of regional ecosystems protected within its boundaries. The park's regional conservation importance is significant as its 298,000 hectares represents over half the total landmass of protected areas within the Southern Brigalow Belt bioregion.

=== Human history ===
Carnarvon National Park is significant to Bidjara, Karingbal, and Kara Kara people of Central Queensland. The park contains multiple reminders of Aboriginal cultural connection in rock art sites, burial places and occupation sites. Kenniff Cave, in the Mount Moffatt section, was the first Australian archaeological site to return carbon dates on occupational evidence that pushed human occupation of the continent into the Late Pleistocene at 19,500 years before present. Prior to D.J. Mulvaney's excavation of Kenniff Cave, it was thought that Australia had only been occupied during the Holocene, fewer than 10,000 years before present.

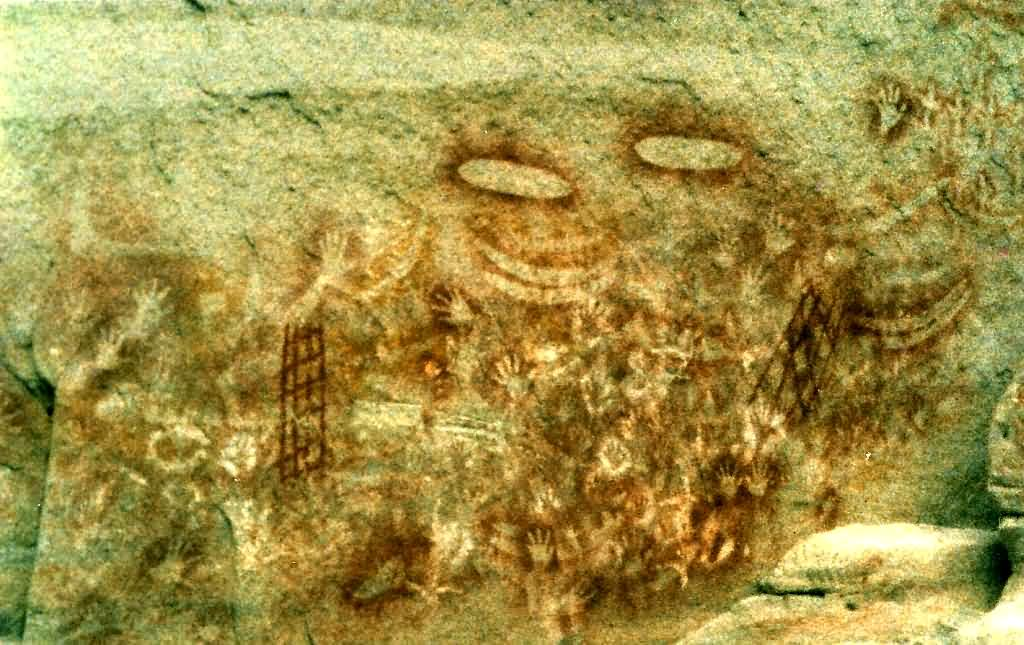
Aboriginal art at Carnarvon Gorge

The rock art within the Carnarvon Gorge is known for its sophisticated stenciling techniques. Beyond handprints, the indigenous stencil artists used ochre spraying methods and overlapping finger techniques to create layers and motifs which have been added on over generations, forming an archive of the cultures and beliefs across generations. The most famous sites to view such rock art within the gorge are the Art Gallery and Cathedral Cave. Only one full adult body stencil is known to exist in the world; it can be seen publicly at the Tombs site in the Mount Moffatt section of the park.

Contemporary Indigenous culture in the park is much changed from that of pre-colonial Central Queensland; however strong Indigenous links to the landscapes within Carnarvon National Park are maintained through traditional owner involvement in the protection and preservation of the Park's cultural sites.

The first European to traverse the future park was Thomas Mitchell, in the 1840s. Settlers followed in the footsteps of the explorers, lured by reports of the region's permanent water. Altercations with local Indigenous groups soon broke out and escalated into a state of mutual aggression that was maintained until the 1870s.

The remoteness of the area during early settlement attracted some interesting local characters, some of whom came to the area to avoid unwanted official scrutiny. The Ward brothers hunted fur in the Carnarvons year round at a time when there were restricted open seasons. The Kenniff brothers (Kenniff Cave's namesakes) became notorious local horse thieves, and later murderers.

Today, tourism, recreation, and conservation are the main human activities conducted on the park. The most popular section of the park is the Carnarvon Gorge section which receives an estimated 65,000 visitors per year. Mount Moffatt is the next most visited section, followed by Salvator Rosa and Ka Ka Mundi. The remaining sections of the park receive virtually no visitation at all, and are consequently high in wilderness values.

Carnarvon National Park offers a variety of recreational activities including four-wheel driving, wildlife watching, hiking along maintained tracks, and bush walking into remote areas. A ninety-kilometre-long trail is currently underway that will allow bush walkers to circumnavigate Carnarvon Gorge in around five days.

== Access ==
The Carnarvon Gorge section is accessible from either Rolleston or Injune along the Carnarvon Highway. The Mount Moffatt section is accessible from either Injune or Mitchell. The Salvator Rosa and Ka Ka Mundi sections are accessible via the Tambo Road from either Tambo or Springsure.

== See also ==
- Protected areas of Queensland
