= Carnarvon Station Reserve =

Protected area in Queensland, Australia

Coordinates: 24°51′23.01″S 146°25′22.08″E

Carnarvon Station Reserve is a 57,009 hectare nature reserve in the Great Dividing Range of south-eastern Central Queensland, Australia. It is adjacent to Carnarvon National Park, and includes most of the Channin Creek valley. It is 600 km west of Bundaberg, and 744 km north-west of Brisbane. It is owned and managed by Bush Heritage Australia (BHA), by which it was purchased in 2001. It is within the traditional lands of the Bidjara people.

== Landscape and plants ==
Carnarvon Station is a former cattle station. The property is composed of rocky hills and plains, with the north-eastern section being the highest and most rugged. All its streams are seasonal, though there are several permanent springs. Vegetation communities include vine thickets, eucalypt and angophora woodlands and open forest, brigalow and belah, as well as grasslands.

== Animals ==
Carnarvon Station, with the adjacent national parks of Carnarvon and Expedition, are part of a high-altitude archipelago of areas of protected woodland in the Great Dividing Range that is critical to the conservation of the eastern Australian bird migration system. Threatened birds recorded from the property include the square-tailed kite, squatter pigeon, glossy black-cockatoo, powerful owl and black-chinned honeyeater.
