= Carnarvon Range =

Mountain range in Queensland, Australia

Carnarvon
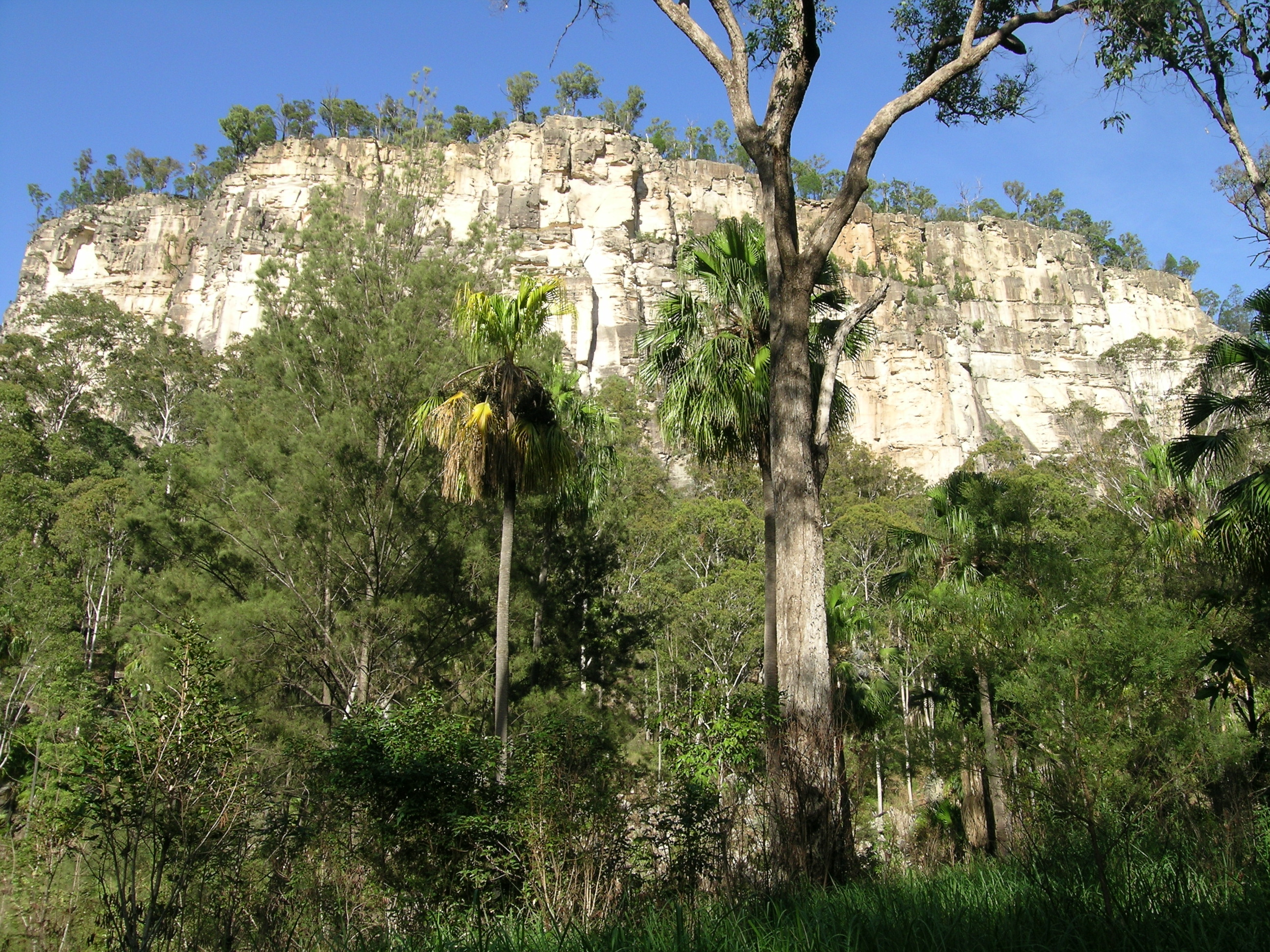

Dimensions
- Length: 160 km (99 mi)

Geography
- Country: Australia
- State: Queensland
- Region: Central Queensland
- Range coordinates: 25°23.8′S 148°36.8′E
- Parent range: Great Dividing Range

The Carnarvon Range is a mountain range in Central Queensland, Australia. It is a plateau section of the Great Dividing Range. The Carnarvon Range is 160 km in length.

== Geography ==
North eastern parts of the range have formed a plateau known as the Consuelo Tableland. The plateau contains Aboriginal paintings and sandstone gorges, including in the Carnarvon Gorge. Part of the range is protected within the Carnarvon National Park.

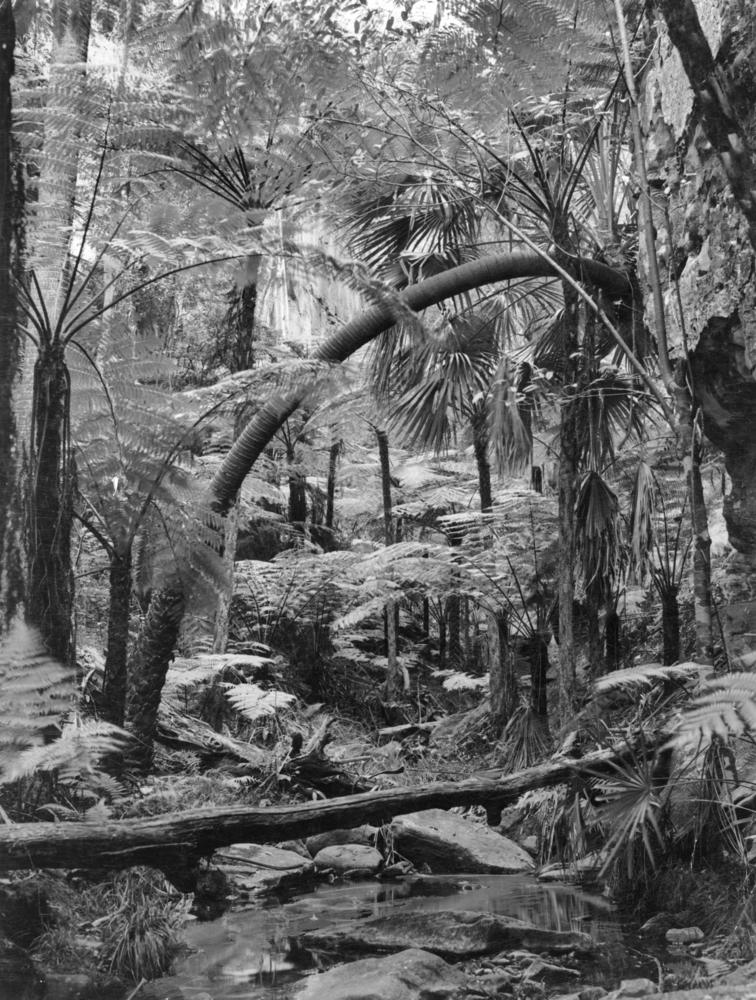
Rainforest in the Carnarvon Range, 1938

The range marks the northernmost limits of the Murray-Darling Basin and is the headwaters for a number of rivers including the Fitzroy River, Warrego River, Dawson River, Merivale River and the Nogoa River.

== History ==
Gungabula (also known as Kongabula and Khungabula) is an Australian Aboriginal language of the headwaters of the Dawson River in Central Queensland. The language region includes areas within the local government area of Maranoa Region, particularly the towns of Charleville, Augathella and Blackall and as well as the Carnarvon Range.

It was first explored by Ludwig Leichhardt but named by Thomas Mitchell, probably after the 4th Earl of Carnarvon.

== Environment ==
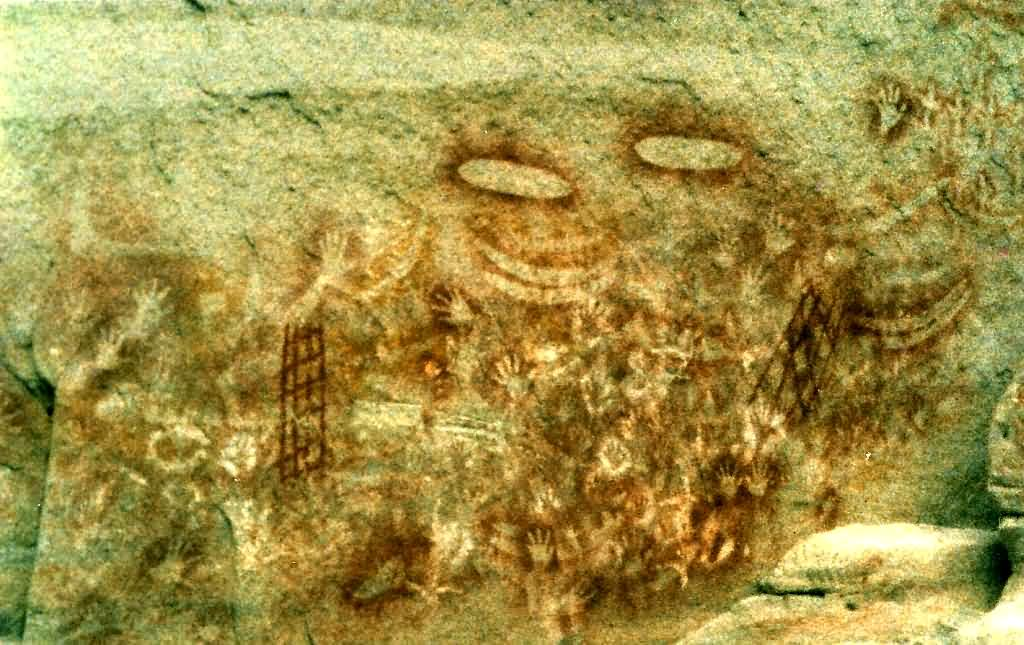
Aboriginal stencil art in Carnarvon Gorge

The cycad species Macrozamia moorei is a native plant species found naturally in the Carnarvon Range.

== See also ==
- List of mountains in Australia
