= Roma–Taroom Road =

Road in Queensland, Australia

Roma–Taroom Road Queensland

General information
- Type: Rural road
- Length: 149 km (93 mi)

Major junctions
- South-west end: Carnarvon Highway, Euthulla
- Glen Arden Road; Pine Hills Road; Yeovil Road
- North-east end: Leichhardt Highway, Taroom

Location(s)
- Major settlements: Durham Downs, Waikola, Eurombah

Roma–Taroom Road is a continuous 149-kilometre (93 mi) road route in the Maranoa, Western Downs and Banana local government areas of Queensland, Australia. It is a state-controlled regional road (number 4397), rated as a local road of regional significance (LRRS).

== Route description ==
The road starts at an intersection with the Carnarvon Highway in the locality of Euthulla in the Maranoa region, about 17.6 kilometres (10.9 mi) north of the town of Roma. It runs north-east across the locality, then along the boundary between Euthulla and Eumamurrin, then between Eumamurrin and Mooga. It then continues north-east across Durham Downs, passing the exit to Glen Arden Road to the south-east. Next it runs along the boundary between Durham Downs and Waikola, entering the Western Downs region as it enters Waikola. It crosses Waikola to the north-east, passing the exit to Pine Hills Road to the south, and then follows the boundary between Waikola and Eurombah.

Continuing north-east across Eurombah the road crosses a regional boundary and enters the Shire of Banana. Soon after leaving Eurombah and entering the locality of Taroom it passes the exit to Yeovil Road to the south-east. It continues north-east across Taroom, turning slightly west of north before entering the town where it ends at an intersection with the Leichhardt Highway.

The road is fully sealed to at least a single lane standard. A project to replace a timber bridge with a new concrete structure was completed in December 2022.

For travel to and from the Roma district this road is part of the shortest route from Gladstone and Rockhampton. It is 119 kilometres (74 mi) shorter than travelling on highways via Miles.

== History ==
Mount Abundance pastoral run was taken up in 1847, then abandoned but not relinquished in 1849 due to constant conflicts with local indigenous people. In 1856 it was sold and the new owner took up residence, considered to be the first European settler in the Roma district. Roma was established prior to 1863 when Queensland's first vine cuttings were planted.

Yingerbay pastoral run was established in 1854 in the west of what is now Euthulla, near the boundary of Bungeworgorai

Mooga was named for a pastoral run established in the area.

Durham Downs Station was established prior to 1873. It was still operating in April 2023.

Eurombah is the name of a pastoral run in the locality of that name. It was still a working property in 2001. Just north of the present locality of Eurombah and west of Taroom, Hornet Bank station was settled in the 1850s.

== Major intersections ==
All distances are from Google Maps.

LGA	Location	km	mi	Destinations	Notes
Maranoa	Euthulla	0	0.0	Carnarvon Highway – north-west – Injune – south – Roma	South-western end of Roma–Taroom Road. Road continues north-east.
Maranoa	Durham Downs	35.7	22.2	Glen Arden Road – south-east – Wallumbilla North, Wallumbilla, Warrego Highway	Road continues north-east.
Western Downs	Waikola	68.6	42.6	Pine Hills Road – south – Wallumbilla North, Wallumbilla, Warrego Highway	Road continues east, then north-east.
Banana	Taroom	128	80	Yeovil Road – south-east – Grosmont, Leichhardt Highway	Road continues north-east.
Banana	Taroom	149	93	Leichhardt Highway – north – Theodore – south – Grosmont, Wandoan, Miles.	North-eastern end of Roma–Taroom Road.
1.000 mi = 1.609 km; 1.000 km = 0.621 mi

== See also ==
- List of numbered roads in Queensland
