= Durham Downs =

Durham Downs may refer to:

- Durham Downs, Queensland, a locality in the Maranoa Region, Australia
- Durham Downs Station, a cattle farm in the Shire of Bullo, Queensland, Australia
