= Gurulmundi, Queensland =

Gurulmundi
- Suburb
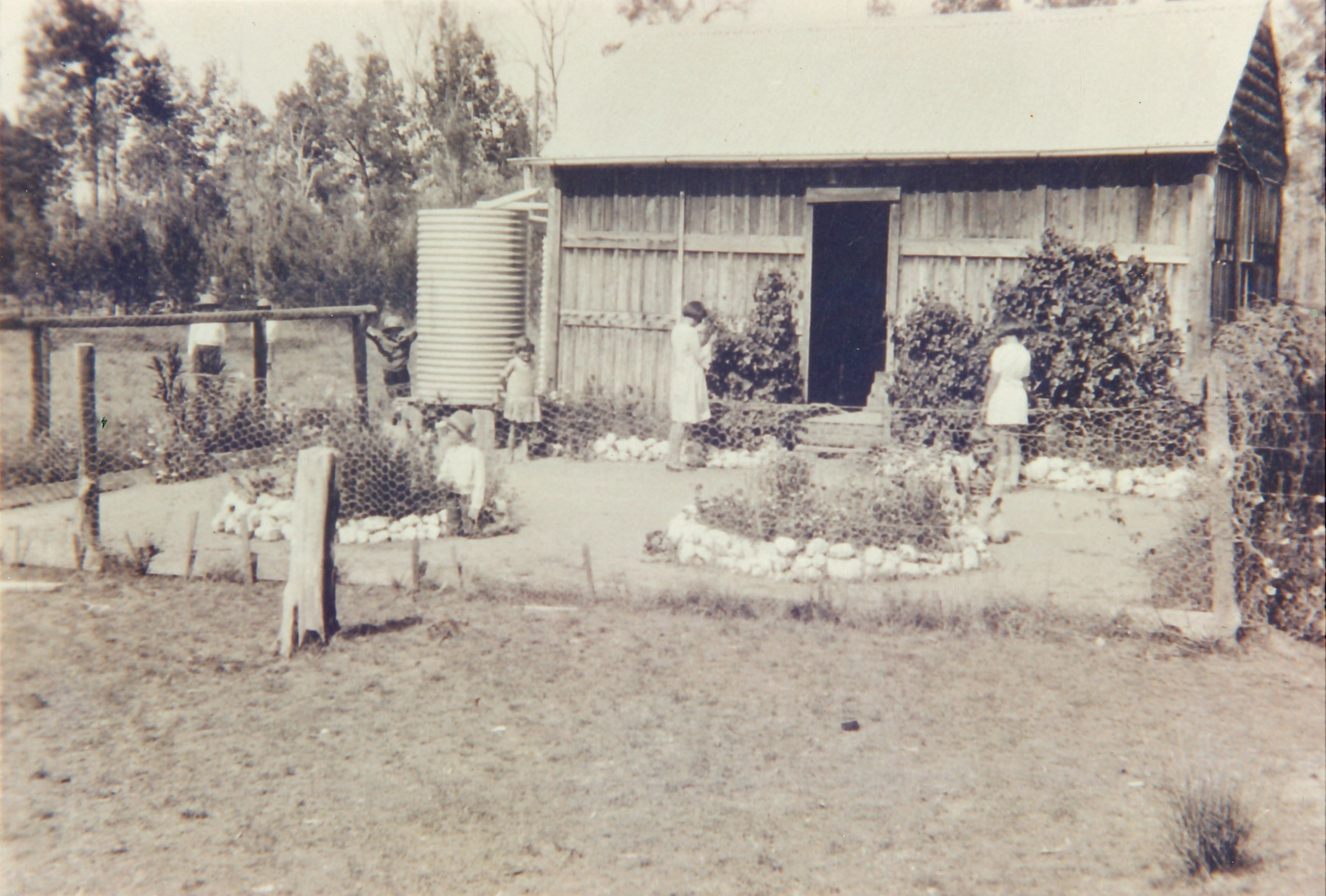
- Gurulmundi Provisional School, 1928-1941

- Interactive map of Gurulmundi
- Coordinates: 26.385°S 150.1305°E
- Country: Australia
- State: Queensland
- LGA: Western Downs Region
- Location: 31.9 km (19.8 mi) N of Miles; 37.0 km (23.0 mi) S of Wandoan; 159 km (99 mi) NW of Dalby; 241 km (150 mi) NW of Toowoomba; 368 km (229 mi) NW of Brisbane

Government
  - State electorate: Callide
  - Federal division: Maranoa

Area
  - Total: 254.5 km^{2} (98.3 sq mi)

Population
  - Total: 19 (2021 census)
  - Density: 0.0747/km^{2} (0.193/sq mi)
- Time zone: UTC+10:00 (AEST)
- Postcode: 4415
Suburbs around Gurulmundi
Guluguba	Guluguba	Pelham
Woleebee	Gurulmundi	Pelham
Glenaubyn	Kowguran	Hookswood

Gurulmundi is a rural locality in the Western Downs Region, Queensland, Australia. In the 2021 census, Gurulmundi had a population of 19 people.

== Geography ==
The ridgeline of the Great Dividing Range forms the northern and western boundaries of the locality.

The Leichhardt Highway enters the locality from the south (Kowguran) and exits to the north-west (Guluguba).

Gurulmundi railway station is an abandoned railway station on the Wandoan railway line (26.4163°S 150.0528°E).

== History ==
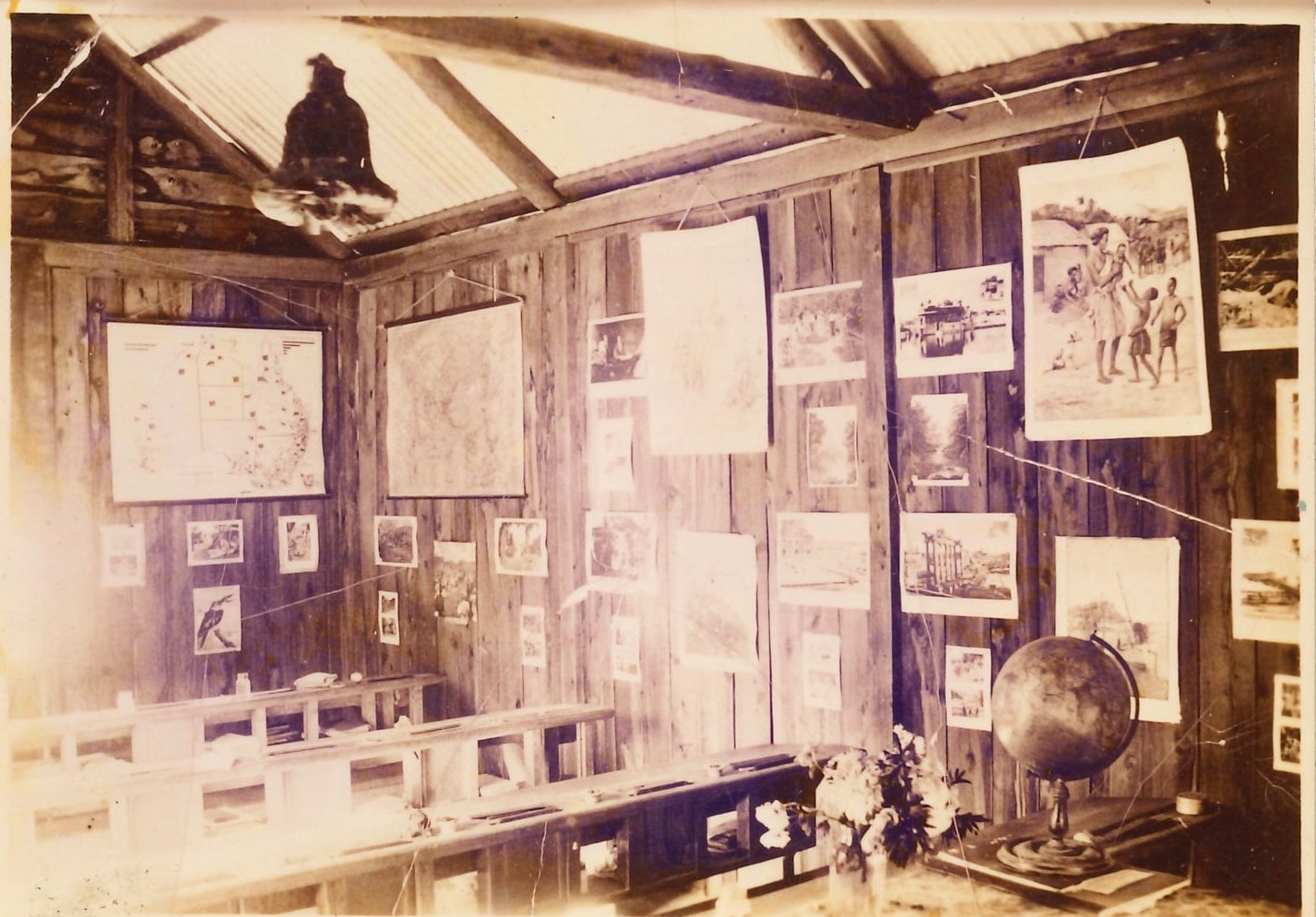
School room, Gurulmundi Provisional School, 1928-1941

The locality's name is an Aboriginal word meaning low hills.

The first Gurulmundi Provisional School was built by the parents in the district from local cypress pine cut with an adze and broad axe. There was a toilet block and a water tank for drinking water. It opened on 27 February 1928 under head teacher Albert F. Armstrong. By 1931, enrolments at the school had dropped and the school was at risk of closing, but, in 1936, the enrolments had increased to 22, and a newer larger school was recommended. In 1941, the State school building in Dogwood was moved to Gurulmundi to replace the original building, which was purchased by a local farmer to be used as a laundry and storage shed.

On 1 January 1944, the school was reclassified as Gurulmundi State School. However, fenrolments began to decline from 1950 and the school was permanently closed on 10 May 1965. It was on the western side of Gurulmundi Road (approx 26.42691°S 150.05515°E).

== Demographics ==
In the 2016 census, Gurulmundi had a population of 7 people.

In the 2021 census, Gurulmundi had a population of 19 people.

== Education ==
There are no schools in Gurulmundi. The nearest government primary schools are Guluguba State School in neighbouring Guluguba to the north and Miles State School in Miles to the south. The nearest government secondary schools are Wandoan State School (to Year 10) in Wandoan to the north and Miles State High School (to Year 12) in Miles to the south.

== Amenities ==
The Gurulmundi branch of the Queensland Country Women's Association meets at the Gurulmundi School of Arts Hall.

== Attractions ==
Gurulmundi is known for its wildflowers.
