= Bungaban, Queensland =

Bungaban
- Suburb
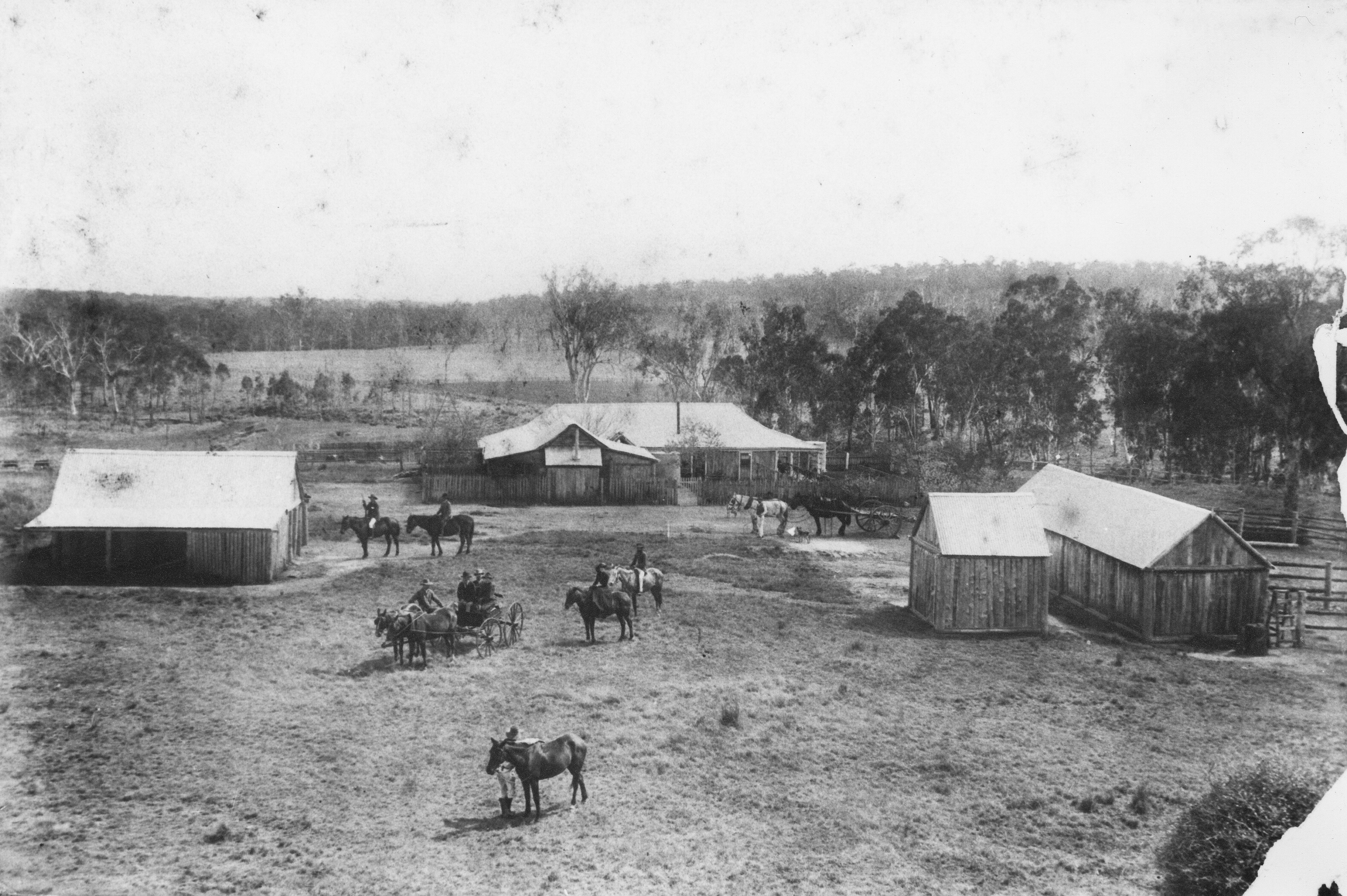
- Bungaban Station homestead, circa 1880

- Interactive map of Bungaban
- Coordinates: 25.9233°S 150.1855°E
- Country: Australia
- State: Queensland
- LGA: Western Downs Region
- Location: 41.5 km (25.8 mi) NE of Wandoan; 60.4 km (37.5 mi) SE of Taroom; 209 km (130 mi) NE of Roma; 235 km (146 mi) NW of Dalby; 446 km (277 mi) NW of Brisbane

Government
  - State electorate: Callide
  - Federal division: Maranoa

Area
  - Total: 858.6 km^{2} (331.5 sq mi)

Population
  - Total: 60 (2021 census)
  - Density: 0.070/km^{2} (0.181/sq mi)
- Time zone: UTC+10:00 (AEST)
- Postcode: 4419
Suburbs around Bungaban
Taroom	Cockatoo	Sujeewong
Grosmont	Bungaban	Auburn
Roche Creek	Roche Creek	Auburn

Bungaban is a rural locality in the Western Downs Region, Queensland, Australia. In the 2021 census, Bungaban had a population of 60 people.

== Geography ==
The Leichhardt Highway runs past the western extremity.

Bungaban has the following mountains:

- Kennedy Peak (25.8178°S 150.3388°E), rising to 463 metres (1,519 ft) above sea level
- Mount Misery (25.8772°S 150.3234°E), 424 metres (1,391 ft)
- The Sisters (25.8524°S 150.1956°E), 390 metres (1,280 ft)

== History ==
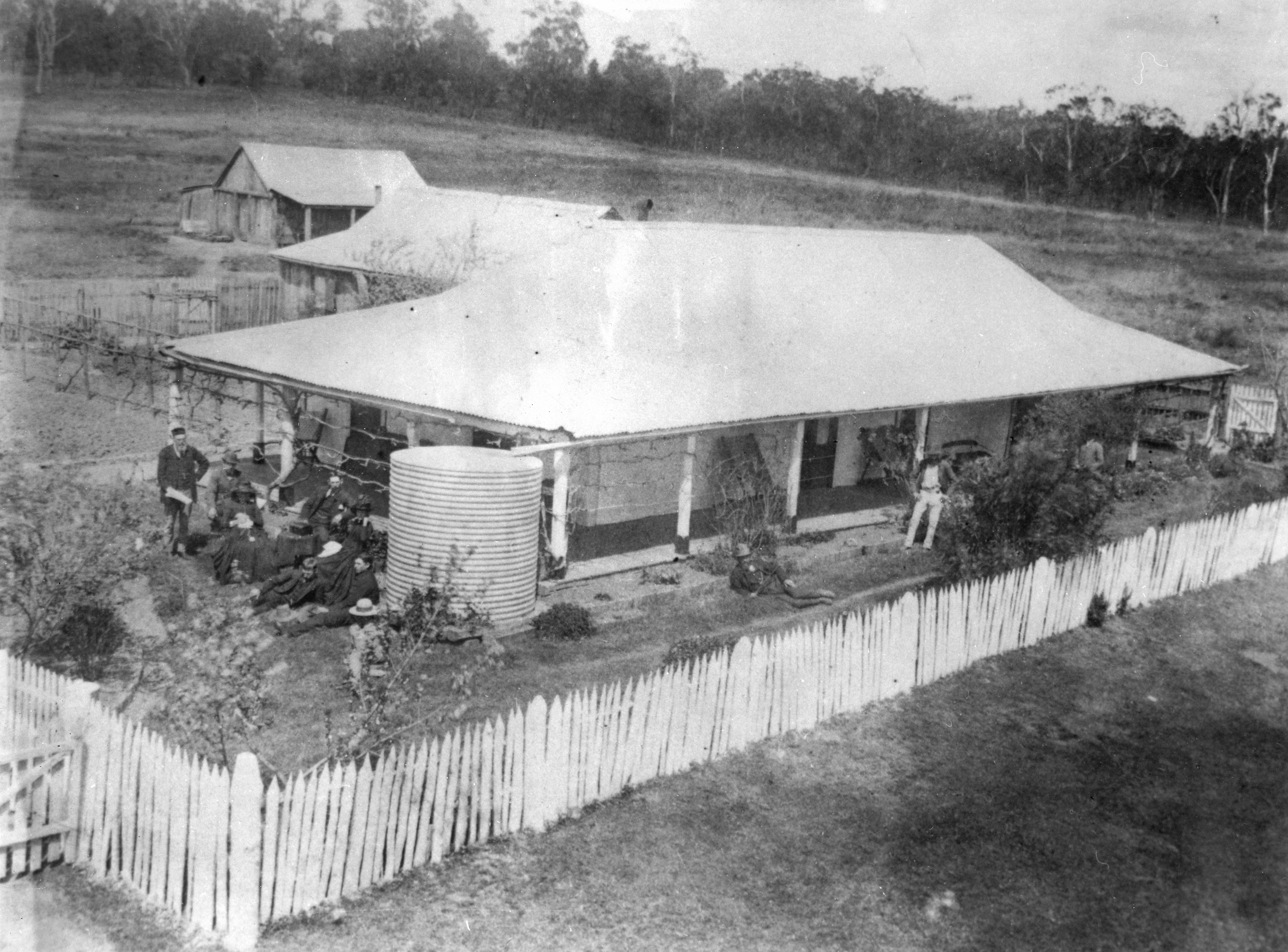
Social gathering at the homestead at Bungaban Station, circa 1888

Cockatoo State School opened on 23 January 1984 and closed on 31 December 2000. It was located in the south of neighbouring Cockatoo, but now within Bungaban at 1473 Ponty Pool Road (25.7901°S 150.2604°E).

== Demographics ==
In the 2016 census, Bungaban had a population of 52 people.

In the 2021 census, Bungaban had a population of 60 people.

== Education ==
There are no schools in Bungaban. The nearest government schools are:

- Grosmont State School (Prep to Year 6) in neighbouring Grosmont to the west
- Taroom State School (Prep to Year 10) in neighbouring Taroom to the north-west
- Wandoan State School (Prep to Year 10) in Wandoan to the south

There is no secondary schooling to Year 12 available nearby and some parts of the north-east of the locality are too distant for secondary schooling to Year 10. The options are distance education and boarding school.

== Economy ==
The Bungaban Wind Energy project is a proposal for $3.9 billion wind farm capable of generating 1.4GW of electricity to be used for both local consumption and to power mineral processing in the Gladstone area.
