= Pelham, Queensland =

Pelham
- Suburb
- Interactive map of Pelham
- Coordinates: 26.2791°S 150.2894°E
- Country: Australia
- State: Queensland
- LGA: Western Downs Region
- Location: 35.9 km (22.3 mi) N of Miles; 51.3 km (31.9 mi) SSE of Wandoan; 163 km (101 mi) NW of Dalby; 245 km (152 mi) NW of Toowoomba; 377 km (234 mi) WNW of Brisbane

Government
  - State electorate: Callide
  - Federal division: Maranoa

Area
  - Total: 573.2 km^{2} (221.3 sq mi)

Population
  - Total: 0 (2021 census)
  - Density: 0.0000/km^{2} (0.0000/sq mi)
- Time zone: UTC+10:00 (AEST)
- Postcode: 4415
Suburbs around Pelham
Guluguba	Roche Creek	Barakula
Guluguba	Pelham	Barakula
Gurulmundi	Hookswood	Hookswood

Pelham is a rural locality in the Western Downs Region, Queensland, Australia. In the 2021 census, Pelham had "no people or a very low population".

== Geography ==
The Great Dividing Range loosely forms the north-western, northern, and north-eastern boundaries of the locality, putting the locality within the Murray-Darling drainage basin.

Quandong State Forest is in the north-west of the locality, while Barakula State Forest is in the east and south of the locality and extends into neighbouring Barakula to the west and neighbouring Hookswood to the south.

Dogwood Creek rises in the north of the locality and flows south-east into Barakula, from where it returns to Pelham forming part of its south-eastern boundary and then exits to Hookwood to the south.

Apart from the state forests, the predominant land use is grazing on native vegetation.

== Demographics ==
In the 2016 census, Pelham had a population of 8 people.

In the 2021 census, Pelham had "no people or a very low population".

== Education ==
There are no schools in Pelham. The nearest government primary schools are Guluguba State School in neighbouring Guluguba to the west, Wandoan State School in Wandoan to the north-west, and Miles State School in Miles to the south. The nearest government secondary schools are Wandoan State School (to Year 10) and Miles State High School (to Year 12) in Miles. However, students in some parts of the locality would be too distant to attend these secondary schools; the alternatives are distance education and boarding school.
