= Fraser family grave site and memorial, Hornet Bank =

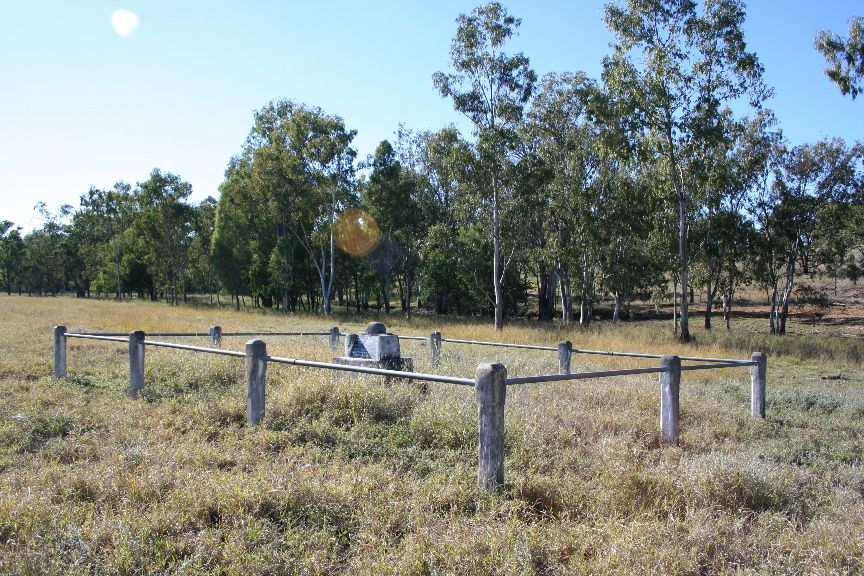
- Fraser family grave site and memorial, Hornet Bank, 2008

- Location within Queensland Location within Australia
- 25.7566°S 149.4043°E
- Location: Hornet Bank Station, Hornet Bank Road, Eurombah, Shire of Banana, Queensland, Australia

Queensland Heritage Register
- Official name: Fraser family grave site and memorial, Hornet Bank
- Type: state heritage (archaeological, built)
- Designated: 18 September 2008
- Reference no.: 602075
- Significant period: 1850s

The Fraser family grave site and memorial at Hornet Bank is a heritage-listed cemetery and memorial at Hornet Bank Station, Hornet Bank Road, Eurombah near Taroom, Shire of Banana, Queensland, Australia. It was added to the Queensland Heritage Register on 18 September 2008.

== History ==
Hornet Bank station in the upper Dawson River district was taken up in 1853 by Andrew Scott and the homestead, on a reduced acreage, remains the property of his direct descendants. In 1857 the station was the site of the killing by local Aborigines of eleven settlers, eight of whom were members of the Fraser family, who were managing Hornet Bank for Scott. The Hornet Bank massacre resonated deeply in colonial circles, escalating the frontier war in the Dawson River district and prejudicing subsequent European-Indigenous relationships throughout Queensland for decades.

Friedrich Wilhelm Ludwig Leichhardt led the first European exploration of the upper Dawson River district in 1845. Within two years of this expedition European settlement in the area had commenced, with squatters attracted by Leichhardt's glowing reports of its rich pastoral land. One of the earliest settlers in the region was Andrew Scott, who took up the first of the Hornet Bank blocks in 1853.

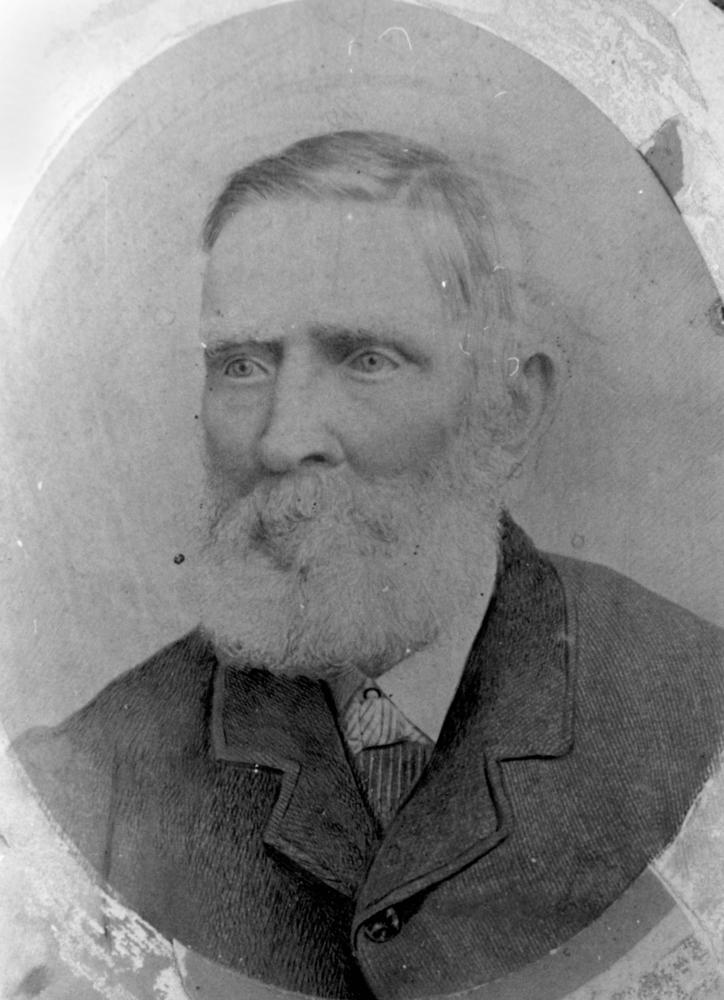
Andrew Scott, circa 1880

Born in Scotland in 1810, Scott arrived in Australia in the late 1830s. He gained pastoral experience at the property of his future father-in-law, Robert Brodie, in the Hunter Valley district of New South Wales. Taking advantage of the newly opening pastoral districts in the north, in September 1853 he applied for a pastoral lease along the Dawson River. The Aboriginal name for the lease area was Gaganybilany, but Scott reputedly named it Hornet Bank after he was attacked by a hornet swarm there. In March 1854 John Fraser, a Scotsman who had worked as a bookkeeper at Jimbour Station on the Darling Downs before moving to Drayton, took on the management of Hornet Bank for Scott and moved there with his wife Martha and their children. In May 1856, while overlanding Hornet Bank sheep to Ipswich, John Fraser became ill and subsequently died in town. Mrs Fraser stayed on at Hornet Bank and her eldest son William, who had established himself as a carrier based at Ipswich, returned to the property to look after the family. William, however, was often away for months at a time in connection with his business.

Around this time tension was increasing between local Aborigines, the Jiman (or Yeeman) people, and the settlers along the Dawson River. A series of incidents in 1856 and 1857 culminated in the killings at Hornet Bank Homestead. As the most western station along the Dawson River, Hornet Bank was an easy target for Aboriginal attack and in late October 1857 it was relatively unguarded with William Fraser absent from the station. The events that unfolded at Hornet Bank in the early morning of 27 October 1857, described in the contemporary press as a "dreadful calamity", resulted in the death of eleven inhabitants of the station, including eight members of the Fraser family, all of whom were women and children, attacked at the homestead. The sole survivor was Sylvester Fraser, the second youngest son of the family, who was aged 15 at the time. The victims were buried on the property. In October 1957, to commemorate the centenary of the killings, a concrete memorial was erected on the grave site by Andrew Scott's descendants.

The Hornet Bank killings revived squatter agitation for greater frontier protection and in the following six months a 'squatter's crusade', supported by sections of the colonial press, was waged throughout the Dawson and Burnett districts by small bands of squatters and Native Police. It has been estimated that several hundred Aborigines were killed during this period. Sporadic warfare continued in the Dawson River area to 1870.

Despite the 1857 tragedy, Andrew Scott retained ownership of Hornet Bank Station. In 1860 he married Robert Brodie's daughter Christina, but the couple did not reside permanently at Hornet Bank until the frontier violence had been quelled. During the mid-1860s Hornet Bank was managed by Andrew Gordon, with whom Scott was in partnership. This was a period of physical expansion for the Hornet Bank head station, with a number of new structures erected, all of timber slab construction. Scott's father-in-law, Robert Brodie, was a stonemason by trade and is believed to have built most of the 1860s slab buildings at Hornet Bank prior to his death there in 1867. Reportedly, after a new slab homestead was completed c. 1865, the house formerly used by the Fraser family was used as a store. Gordon Reid, author of A Nest of Hornets (1982), described the original house as "like the usual bush hut of those days; it had a verandah and a bark roof, and was divided into three main rooms - a sitting room, a store and a sleeping room, the last being in the middle."

Andrew Scott had acquired numerous properties in the Leichhardt district by the mid-1880s, when Hornet Bank was one of 19 runs he consolidated as the 640 square mile Goongarry Station. In November 1887 the oldest improvements on Hornet Bank were the woolshed and associated yards and pens, which were 30 years old (i.e. erected c. 1857). The main house, constructed of shingles, slabs and sawn timber and the store, of shingle and slab with excavated cellars, were recorded as 22 years old (i.e., erected c. 1865). A cottage of sawn timber with an iron roof had just been erected (c. 1887). At this time the head station also contained a c. 1877 buggy and dray shed, a c. 1883 meat house, a c. 1885 school house of slabs with an iron roof, and a c. 1885 stables. No mention was made in the 1887 report of a slab house or store dating to the 1850s. Of the structures on Hornet Bank extant in 1887, only the c. 1865 slab building survives.

That the residence associated with the 1857 killings had been removed was confirmed in 1916–1917, when the station was visited by the Royal Commission into Public Works enquiring into a proposed railway from Juandah (now Wandoan) to Taroom: "When the Commissioners visited Hornet Bank during one of their inspection tours they found that the old homestead where the massacre occurred was removed and in its stead a more up-to-date residence erected."

On Andrew Scott's death in 1892, Hornet Bank passed to his sons.

== Description ==
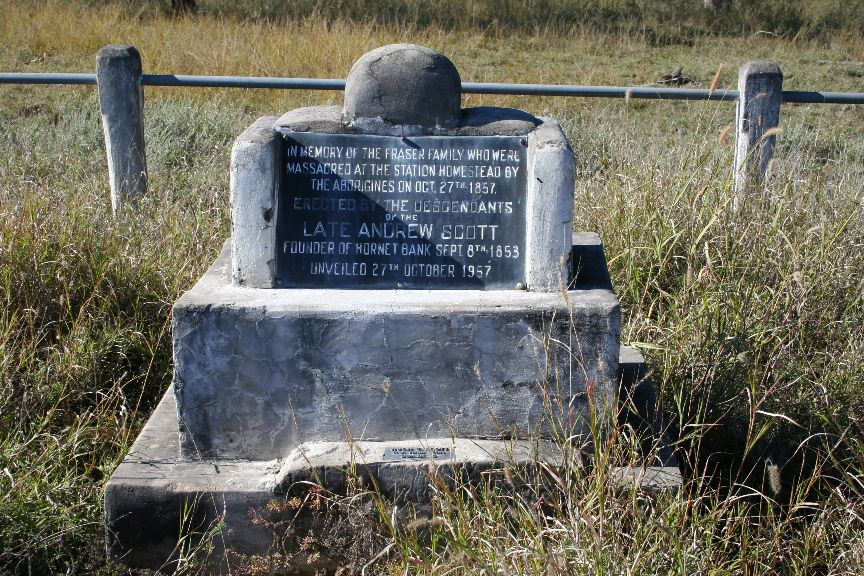
Closeup of the memorial, 2008

The Fraser family grave is located approximately 250 metres (820 ft) northwest of the Hornet Bank home yard, beyond a waterhole. The site is marked by a fence of hollow metal rails between low timber posts. There is no evidence of individual graves or headstones within this enclosure.

A stepped three-tiered concrete plinth stands to the middle of the fenced area and accommodates a plaque, with the inscription:

In memory of the Fraser family who were massacred at the station homestead by the aborigines on October 27th 1857.

Erected by the descendants of the late Andrew Scott, founder of Hornet Bank September 8, 1853. Unveiled 27th October 1957.

A small metal plaque at the base of the front face of the memorial records:

Hugh T Scott & J Hamilton, Builders

== Heritage listing ==
The Fraser family grave site and memorial at Hornet Bank was listed on the Queensland Heritage Register on 18 September 2008 having satisfied the following criteria.

The place is important in demonstrating the evolution or pattern of Queensland's history.

The Fraser family grave site and memorial is significant for its association with early non-Indigenous settlement on the upper Dawson River region, during a period of violent interaction between European pastoralists and Indigenous people. Hornet Bank station, established in 1853, was one of the earliest pastoral runs taken up in the Leichhardt district. In 1857 the head station was the site of an attack by Aborigines in which eleven inhabitants of the station were killed, including eight members of the Fraser family, all of whom were buried on the property. The Hornet Bank killings escalated a sporadic frontier war in the Dawson River area until Indigenous resistance was quelled by 1870, and prejudiced subsequent European-Indigenous relationships throughout Queensland for decades.

The place has potential to yield information that will contribute to an understanding of Queensland's history.

Through archaeological investigation of the grave site combined with extensive documentary material relating to the 1857 killings at Hornet Bank, the place has the potential to yield information that will contribute to further understanding of frontier relations between Aborigines and non-Indigenous settlers.
