= Eurombah, Queensland =

Eurombah
- Suburb
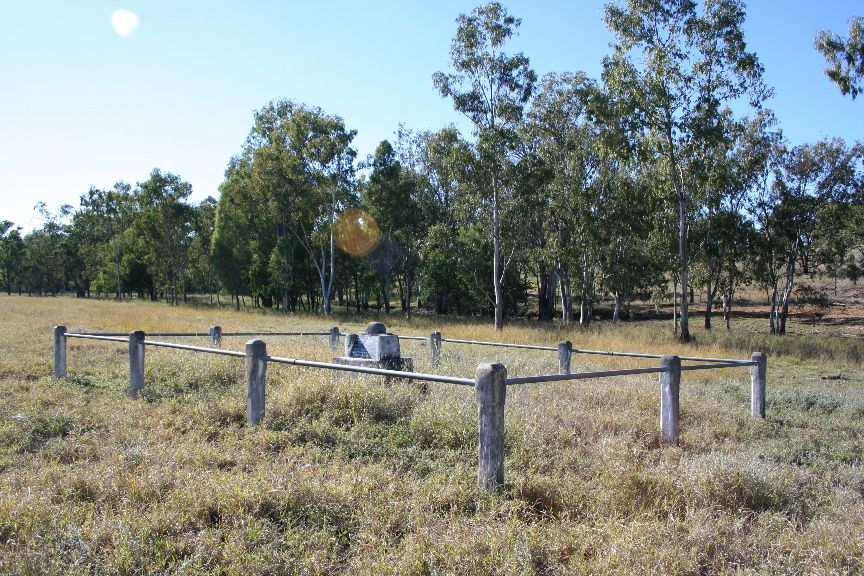
- Hornet Bank massacre graves, 2008

- Interactive map of Eurombah
- Coordinates: 25.9530°S 149.3855°E
- Country: Australia
- State: Queensland
- LGAs: Shire of Banana; Western Downs Region
- Location: 121 km (75 mi) NE of Roma; 244 km (152 mi) SW of Biloela; 273 km (170 mi) NW of Dalby; 356 km (221 mi) NW of Toowoomba; 484 km (301 mi) NW of Brisbane

Government
  - State electorate: Callide
  - Federal divisions: Flynn; Maranoa

Area
  - Total: 997.5 km^{2} (385.1 sq mi)

Population
  - Total: 100 (2021 census)
  - Density: 0.10/km^{2} (0.26/sq mi)
- Time zone: UTC+10:00 (AEST)
- Postcode: 4420
Suburbs around Eurombah
Baroondah	Kinnoul	Taroom
Baroondah	Eurombah	Grosmont
Waikola	Clifford	Bundi

Eurombah is a rural locality split between the Shire of Banana and the Western Downs Region, Queensland, Australia. In the 2021 census, Eurombah had a population of 100 people.

== Geography ==
The Dawson River forms part of the northern boundary.

The Roma-Taroom Road runs through from south-west to north-east.

The neighbourhoods of Peek-A-Doo and Hornet Bank are within the locality.

== History ==
The Hornet Bank massacre in 1857 happened nearby.

The Peek-A-Doo State School opened on 3 February 1964 at 10118 Roma Taroom Road (25.9081°S 149.4995°E). It was mothballed on 13 April 2010 (having no students). In June 2010, there was outrage when it was announced that the then-mothballed school would be allocated $250,000 by the Australian Government's Building the Education Revolution school building program to construct a resource centre. However, it was not constructed as the school closed on 31 December 2010. The school's website was archived.

== Demographics ==
In the 2016 census, Eurombah had a population of 67 people.

In the 2021 census, Eurombah had a population of 100 people.

== Heritage listings ==
Eurombah has a number of heritage-listed sites, including:

- Fraser family grave site and memorial, Hornet Bank: Hornet Bank Road (25.7566°S 149.4043°E):

== Education ==
There are no schools in Eurombah. The nearest government primary schools are Taroom State School in Taroom and Gromont State School in Grosmont. The nearest government secondary schools are Taroom State School (to Year 10) and Wandoan State School in Wandoan (to Year 10). For schooling to Year 12, the nearest government school is Roma State College in Roma, 125 kilometres (78 mi) away; the alternatives are distance education and boarding schools.
