= Dogwood Creek (Queensland) =

River in Australia

Coordinates: 27°02′59″S 149°37′59″E

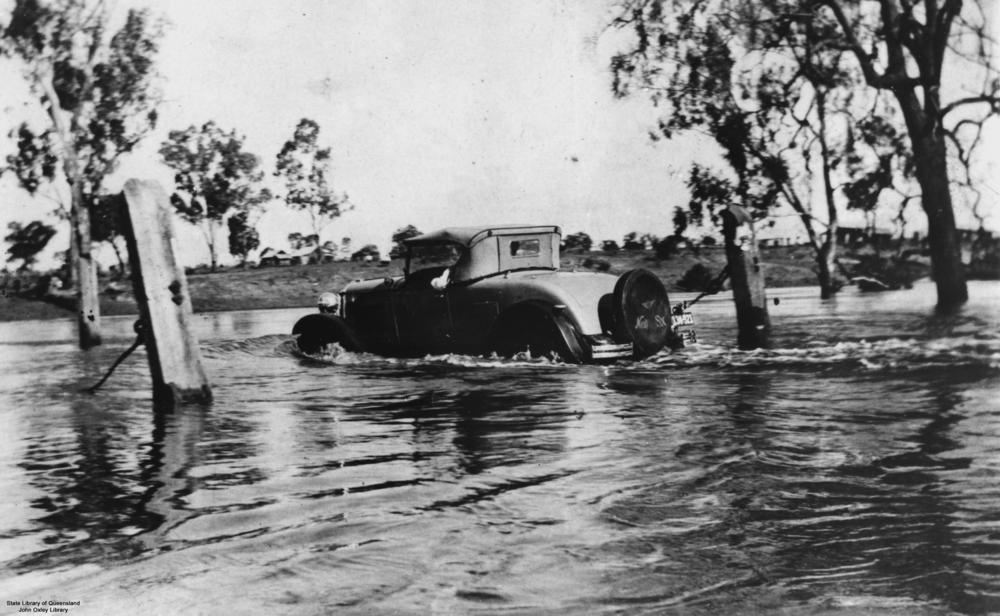
Flooded Dogwood Creek, Miles, Queensland, 1930s

Dogwood Creek is a creek in the Maranoa Region, Queensland, Australia.

== Geography ==
Dogwood Creek rises in the locality of Pelham. It is 212 kilometres (132 mi) long and drops from an elevation 361 metres to 260 metres (101 metres in total).

Fish found in the creek include golden perch, Mary River cod, Murray cod, silver perch, spangled perch and yabbies.

The creek eventually merges with the Balonne River to become part of the Condamine River within the Murray-Darling basin.

== History ==
The creek was named after the dogwood bushes in the area by explorer Ludwig Leichhardt on 23 October 1844 on his expedition from Moreton Bay to Port Essington (now Darwin, Northern Territory).

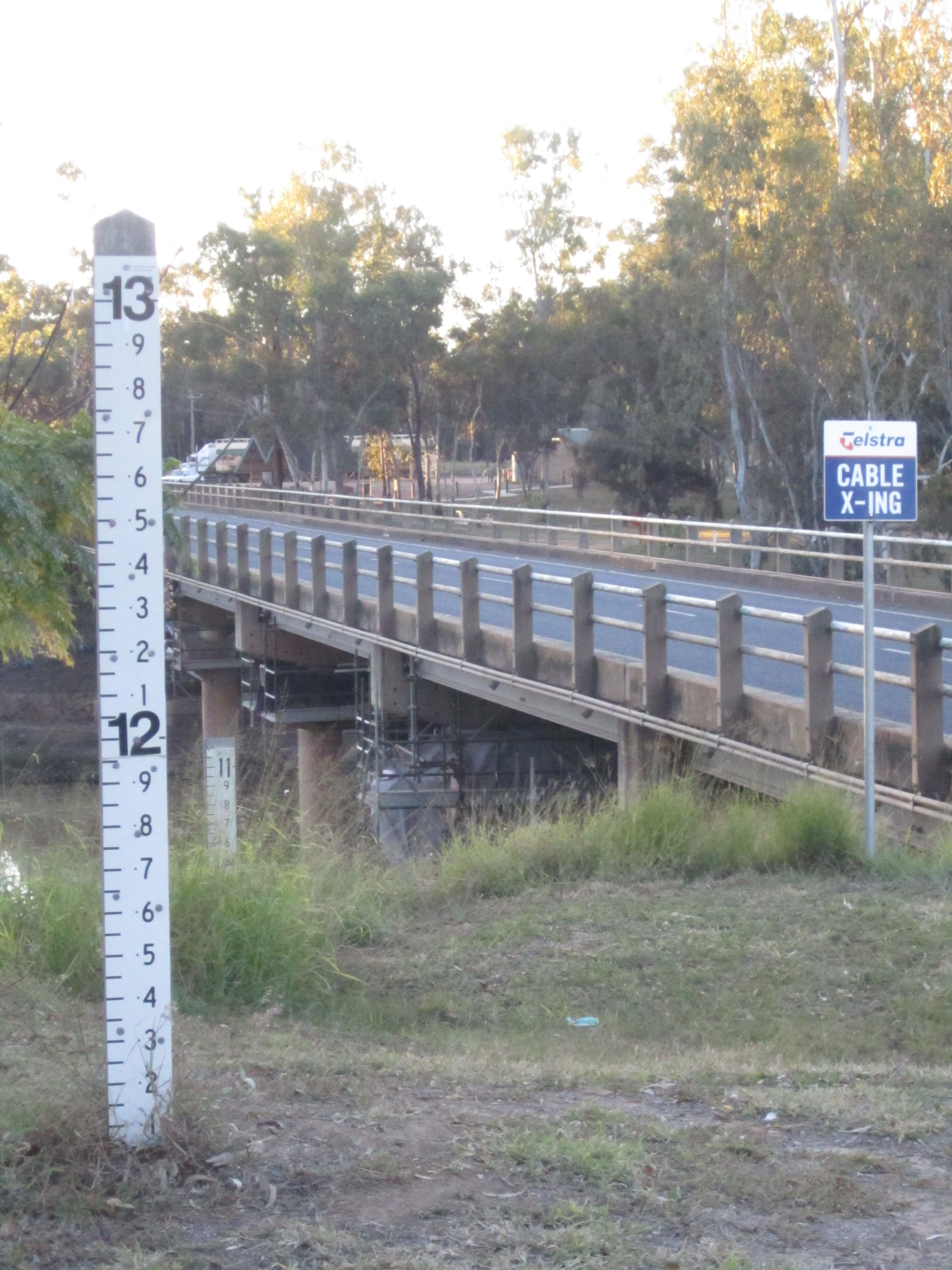
Bridge over Dogwood Creek at Miles, 2011

A commonly used track to access homesteads in the area (now the Warrego Highway) crossed the creek; that location became known as Dogwood Crossing. This would later develop into the town of Miles.

Dogwood Creek has flooded on many occasions, including 1908 and 1938.
