= Waaje Fire Tower No.4 =

- Location within Queensland
- 26.2092°S 150.3803°E
- Location: Barakula State Forest, Barakula, Western Downs Region, Queensland, Australia

History
- Design period: 1940s-1960s Post-WWII
- Built: 1964

Queensland Heritage Register
- Official name: Waaje Fire Tower No.4
- Type: state heritage
- Designated: 25 January 2018
- Reference no.: 650070
- Type: Forestry and timber industry: Fire tower/lookout
- Theme: Exploiting, utilising and transforming the land: Exploiting natural resources; Exploiting, utilising and transforming the land: Managing flora and fauna
- Builders: Arthur Leis

Waaje Fire Tower No.4 is a heritage-listed fire lookout tower at Barakula State Forest, Barakula, Western Downs Region, Queensland, Australia. It was built in 1964 by Arthur Leis. It was added to the Queensland Heritage Register on 25 January 2018.

== History ==
Waaje Fire Tower No.4, located in Barakula State Forest over 60 kilometres (37 mi) north-northwest of Chinchilla, is a four-legged timber (Type G) fire tower with cabin, with single-length grey ironbark poles and a total height of approximately 34 metres (112 ft). It was erected in May 1964 by Arthur Leis, for the Queensland Forestry Department, to help pinpoint fire outbreaks within valuable native forest. It was the first Queensland fire tower to exceed 30 metres (98 ft) in height, and is now the tallest surviving intact four-legged timber fire tower, the tallest Queensland timber fire tower with single-length poles, and the last intact 1960s four-legged timber fire tower. It and the other staffed fire towers in Queensland have been rendered obsolete by a shift to using remote camera surveillance to detect fires, instead of on-site human observers.

Barakula State Forest, established in 1907, was part of Queensland Government's efforts to conserve native forests for sustainable forestry. Of Queensland's natural resources, timber was the most obvious and abundant to the first Europeans, and the timber industry played a vital role in the economic development of Queensland, while also providing its most important building material. From the earliest days of non-Indigenous occupation, Queensland's native timbers were exploited; by timber getters, as well as by settlers clearing agricultural or pastoral land. The first timber reserves, gazetted in 1870, were aimed at protecting timber for future railway use. The construction of railways, which both promoted closer settlement and increased access to timber resources, also used hardwood timber for sleepers.

Efforts began in the late 19th century to save the timber resource from being totally exhausted. The Crown Lands Act 1876 prohibited cutting of certain species on vacant Crown Land or pastoral leases, and placed girth limits on cutting pine and cedar, while the Crown Lands Act 1884 enabled the Queensland Government to reserve State Forests on Crown Land, and seek royalties from licensed timber getters on Crown Lands. However, these laws could not compete with the dominant philosophy of the time, which was to promote settlement and development. By 1885, there were 161 Timber Reserves (covering 636,484ha) and 16 State Forests (81,980ha) but the 1880s were also boom years for timber exploitation in Queensland.

During the 1890s there was increased concern that government revenue was being lost to unregulated timber exploitation. The creation of the Forestry Branch in 1900 within the Lands Department represented a shift in approach. While the responsibility for leasing timber reserves and reservation of Crown Lands for forestry initially stayed with the Lands Department, the Forestry Branch became responsible for reforestation, research, land acquisition, the control and prohibition of fires, surveys, timber harvesting and marketing (including roads and logging), sawmill licenses, and (eventually) national park management. The first staff consisted of an Inspector of Forests and two Forest Rangers. Forestry staff numbers were: 5 in 1906, 1900 in 1939, and 2127 in 1965–1966.

Phillip MacMahon's appointment as Director of Forests (1905–10) marked the beginning of professional forestry in Queensland, and Minister for Lands Joshua Bell introduced the "State Forests and National Parks Bill" in November 1906. This allowed the permanent reservation of Crown Land for State Forests and National Parks, within which alienation of land was prohibited without an Act of Parliament, although there were special purpose and occupation licenses. Holders of leases and licenses could not cut timber without authorisation. The State Forests and National Parks Act 1906 took effect on 1 January 1907.

The quality of the ironbark trees in the Chinchilla District had been commented on in 1906 by FW Wade, State Forest Ranger, when he inspected the country north of the Western Railway between Chinchilla and Miles. The main trees in this area at the time were narrow-leafed ironbark (Eucalyptus crebra), spotted gum (Eucalyptus maculata) and red and black cypress pine (Callitris spp). Ironbark (a fire tolerant hardwood) and cypress pine (a fire sensitive softwood) were already being cut, with new sawmills opening in the area. In 1935 it was also reported that there were large supplies of valuable timber such as cypress pine, spotted gum, and narrow leaf ironbark, in the Dalby forestry district.

On 8 June 1907, a Reserve for a State Forest was created in the Dalby and Taroom Land Agent's Districts, under The State Forests and National Parks Act 1906, covering 479 square miles (306,560 acres or 124,060ha), in the counties of Newcastle, Auburn, Lytton; and the parishes of Coondarra, Goldsmith, Malcolm, Macdonald, Ballon and Burncluith. In 1908 the first National Parks were declared in Queensland: Witches Falls National Park at Tamborine Mountain and Bunya Mountains National Park. Barakula State Forest was the largest in Queensland and it remains so in 2017, covering 283,500ha. It is also the largest in the Southern Hemisphere. In 1908 the next largest State Forest, of 46,720 acres (18,907ha), was on the Blackdown Tableland Forest Reserve in the Rockhampton District.

By 1912, a 25-mile-long (40 km) railway had been built into the State Forest, from Chinchilla, in order to obtain hardwood sleepers for the railways, and the terminus was named Barakula, the Aboriginal term for "big timber". A timber mill was also established at Barakula by the Queensland Government, and the State Forest was called Barakula State Forest by 1927.

During the early 20th century, there was increased government concern about the depletion of native timber supplies. Under Norman William Jolly and then Edward Swain as Director of Forests (1911–1918, and 1918–1932 respectively), the Queensland Government established native softwood (hoop pine) plantations and attempted to regenerate native forest areas. The Forestry Branch applied silvicultural (forest cultivation) improvement regimes, including ringbarking old and unproductive trees, regeneration burns, and slashing new growth competing with seedlings. Under Swain, offices were established in six forestry regions: Atherton, Brisbane, Bundaberg-Rockhampton, Gympie, Maryborough, and Dalby (Barakula State Forest lies within the latter). By 1919 there were five nurseries, 27 plantations, and 23 regeneration areas.

Part of the work of the Forestry Branch, and its later incarnations, was protecting plantations and State Forests from fire. The Provisional Forestry Board was created in 1924 with Forestry becoming a sub-department of the Department of Lands in 1932, and an independent department in 1957. Consideration was given to the need for effective fire protection as early as 1911, when it was discussed at an Interstate Conference on Forestry held in Sydney. As the new Forestry Branch initially had few resources, fire protection was limited to roads and firebreaks, with fire spotters operating from natural high points and trees. During the 1930s, the Forestry Branch applied a fire exclusion policy, where fire breaks were created adjacent to the forest to be protected, with no burn-offs within the State Forest or reserve. The early detection of any wildfires within the protected forests was thus vital. This policy continued into the 1940s and 1950s but a series of bad fires in the 1950s and early 1960s led to a reappraisal of the exclusion policy (which had led to a build-up of dry fuel for fires) and a change to controlled burning in suitable weather. Experiments in controlled burning occurred in the late 1950s.

The requirement for early fire detection in Queensland led to the construction of lookouts, lowset fire cabins, and cabins on towers, which would work alongside improved communications, firebreaks, fire huts with water tanks, and access roads for fire-fighting. The first official lookout station was at Observation Hill, at Good Night Scrub State Forest west of Bundaberg, in 1931. A 15-metre (49 ft) high four-legged timber fire tower with a cabin and telephone was built in 1933–4 at Wongabel, the first of its kind in Queensland; and the first standard design timber ground cabin, Watalgan Fire Cabin No.4, was built in the Littabella Forest Reserve in 1935. Wongabel Fire Tower No.1 (demolished) was in the Barron State Forest. Watalgan Fire Cabin No.4 may no longer exist; in 2004 it was reported that it was last seen in 1997, and may have been destroyed by fire.

The first fire observation structure built in Barakula State Forest was Barakula Fire Tower No.1 (1938, demolished), which was a four-legged timber tower, 15 metres (49 ft) high, with a forestry cottage nearby; and the lowset timber Turkey Mountain Fire Cabin No.6 was built in 1940 (since removed), about 51 kilometres (32 mi) west-southwest of Waaje Fire Tower No.4. In 2006 the Turkey Mountain Fire Cabin was one of the oldest surviving fire observation structures in use in Queensland. The road up Turkey Mountain was built by Italian internees during World War II.

From 1930 to 2003, 129 timber or steel fire observation structures were built in Queensland, with 66 surviving by 2004. Although Queensland's fire towers were built as far north as the Atherton Tableland, most were located along the coast from Brisbane and Toowoomba north to Bundaberg; and in a north-south swathe to the west of Toowoomba.

The early fire towers were built with timber and were usually designed by the men who built them. Large timber poles (preferably grey ironbark, Eucalyptus paniculata) were used for the legs (a single pole per leg, or poles spliced together for taller towers), which added stiffness and strength in high winds. Tall trees with a straight bole (trunk) and a minimal "pipe" of dead wood in the centre were used in fire tower construction. They were dressed by removing the branch stubs and straightened by trimming the outside of any bend with a broadaxe.

Originally, the poles were set directly into the ground but later they were bolted to steel brackets set in concrete footings, as first occurred in 1941 at Beerburrum. The towers were generally sited where there was dense, high quality and fire-susceptible timber worth protecting and they required road access to near the centre of a forest or a high point. The height of the tower was determined by estimating the height of the mature trees it would need to see over. Initially, this involved sending someone up a radio mast with a camera.

One of the men who constructed Queensland's fire towers was Arthur Leis, who built 28 towers between 1957 and 1987, including Queensland's first three-legged timber tower, Mount Binga Fire Tower No.4 (1967, 31.8 metres (104 ft)) near Cooyar, and the three-legged timber Jimna Fire Tower No.10, Queensland's tallest fire tower (1977, pole length 44 metres (144 ft)). Leis designed the first three-legged tower after being that told the four-legged towers were getting too expensive to build. The triangular structure of three-legged towers provided more strength, with fewer components. The fire tower construction process followed by Leis included: forming a small clearing at the tower's site with a bulldozer; choosing anchor trees to guy (rope) the poles in an upright position until they were fastened in place; transporting the poles to the site to be dressed; bolting wales (horizontally fixed timbers) and braces (diagonally fixed) between pairs of legs, with this carpentry, as well as construction of the cabin, occurring on the ground; raising a "Sampson" pole, which was used to help haul up the other tower legs; and then adding the stairs and cabin. Presumably, for a four-legged tower, bracing would have been added between the two pairs of braced legs, after they were raised. Arthur Leis built 23 towers. Queensland's three-legged timber towers are believed to be unique in the world, although there are some internet references to three-legged steel fire towers in the United States.

Tower design has changed over the years. Internal stairs were used instead of ladders from c. 1940. The earlier cabins were entered by a trap door in the floor but later external cabin decks were added (from 1958 at Mount Borumba in the locality of Lake Borumba) and doorways from these decks into the cabins soon became the sole point of entry (for example at Waaje Fire Tower No.4). Queensland's first steel fire tower (four-legged) was built in at Lemon Tree Hill near Cardwell in 1966 and the last (and tallest) four-legged timber tower, Yuleba Fire Tower No.1 (36.6 metres (120 ft)), was built at the Amoolee Departmental Purposes Reserve the same year. With the move to three-legged timber towers, spliced poles became the norm, rather than single-length poles. The last three-legged timber fire tower was built in 1987 at Wolvi.

The early detection of a wildfire was more important to successful firefighting than firebreaks and the sooner the location of a fire was accurately pinpointed, the better. The tower cabins were staffed by fire spotters with two or more towers working in tandem to locate a fire. Each cabin contained a map table with a 1:50,000 scale map (centred on the tower and marked with 360 degrees) and some had photographed or painted panoramas around the internal walls under the windows naming visible landscape features. A fine wire ran from the centre of the map to the ceiling. When smoke was spotted, the observer could stand behind the table and align the wire with the base of the fire and read the compass bearing from the degrees written on the cabin walls. The distance to the fire was estimated based on known landmarks, the sighting was added to the tower log book and a radio or telephone was used to communicate with other towers or the forestry base. Once a second tower took a bearing on the fire, its exact location could be confirmed by triangulation and fire fighters and equipment could be dispatched to the correct spot.

The increased demand for timber during and after World War II meant the Queensland Government pursued a reforestation policy after the war. Declining extraction of native hoop pine and bunya pine from the early 1940s was replaced with plantation pine, native cypress pine and hardwoods. State Forests provided 68% of Queensland's cut timber during the war, and 94% of all pine. Fire tower construction also continued, to protect the new plantations, and a bad fire season in 1957 boosted fire detection efforts. In 1963 Barakula Fire Tower No.2 (four-legged timber, 15 metres (49 ft), demolished) was constructed in the Barakula State Forest.

In 1964 Waaje Fire Tower No.4 was erected in the Waaje logging area of Barakula State Forest, on a section of the Great Dividing Range with a view over the surrounding forest. The tower could be staffed after lightning storms or during high fire danger periods. A "Type G" four-legged timber fire tower, Waaje Fire Tower No.4 had: four single-length poles fixed to steel straps set in concrete footings; eight braced sections; internal parallel stairs with landings and handrails; and external deck access to the cabin, which had wide eaves. Built by Arthur Leis, with a pole height of about 30.5 metres (100 ft), it was the first Queensland fire tower to exceed 30 metres (98 ft) in height and to have sole access into the cabin from the external deck rather than via a trapdoor in the cabin floor. Its total height, including cabin, is estimated at 34 metres (112 ft). The project was also the first and only time that Forestry used a rigging firm, and a series of photographs, dated May 1964, recorded the construction. A scenic montage of the viewed landscape, up to 50 kilometres (31 mi) away, was reportedly painted around the ceiling wall to indicate notable features, compass bearings and distance (not extant in 2017).

Another fire tower was soon opened in Barakula State Forest. In 1970 the Minister for Lands, Vic Sullivan, opened Coondarra Fire Tower No.5 (three-legged timber, 40.3 metres (132 ft) high, also built by Arthur Leis) about 25 kilometres (16 mi) west-southwest of Waaje Fire Tower No.4. The two towers worked in conjunction to pinpoint fires. In 2017, the cabin and part of the structure of Coondarra Fire Tower No.5 was in the process of being moved to the Chinchilla Historical Museum in Villiers Street, Chinchilla.

Despite the existence of fire towers, errors could still be made in fire detection. During the 1965–1966 financial year, a fire in the Waaje logging area caused $6,500 worth of damage and "thick dust haze caused experienced lookout observers to over-estimate grossly [sic] the distance of this fire, and it was not fought until it was quite large after ground reconnaissance established its location".

Other towers related to fire-fighting were built in the Barakula State Forest but these were steel and did not include cabins: Mount George Fire Tower No.7 (four-legged steel tank stand tower, 15 metres (49 ft)), and Wongongera Fire Tower No.8 (four-legged steel tank stand tower, 21.2 metres (70 ft)) were built in 1968 and 1982 respectively. By 2003, there were also fire huts and tanks in the O'Donnell, Fairyland and Hurdle logging areas.

By 1980, when Queensland had 3,715,823ha of State Forest, the Dalby Forestry District contained 974,700ha (next biggest area was in the Rockhampton District, with 685,740ha). In 1989, the Forestry Department was amalgamated into the Department of Primary Industries (called the Department of Agriculture and Fisheries in 2017), becoming the Queensland Forest Service and in 1995 the commercial and forest management functions of the Department were separated into the Resource Management Business Group and the Forestry Group. The Forest Service's activities in plantations, native forests and quarries were fully commercialised under the new Forestry Group. By the late 1990s, the Department of Primary Industry Forestry was responsible for commercial operations on 4.7 million hectares of Queensland's publicly owned forest estate, including 180,000ha of plantations.

In the late 1990s, a Comprehensive Regional Assessment of forests in the southeast Queensland bioregion was undertaken as part of a joint Australian and Queensland effort to form a Regional Forest Agreement (to balance conservation and sustainable use). A heritage inventory of infrastructure on forestry land, which occurred as part of this process, was later extended to the Southern Brigalow Belt bioregion in 1998–99. A joint Department of Primary Industries (DPI Forestry) and Environmental Protection Agency (Queensland Parks and Wildlife Service) project in early 2003 attempted to identify and assess the heritage values of Forestry infrastructure on Queensland Government land in the Brigalow Belt bioregion.

A Fire Observation Structures Heritage Project assessed the heritage values of all fire observation structures in Queensland, short-listing the most significant. In 2004, six fire observation structures were recommended for consideration for nomination to the Queensland Heritage Register. These included: Danbulla Fire Tower No.2 (1968, four-legged steel, 18.3 metres (60 ft)); Mount Allan Fire Tower No.5 (1954, four-legged timber, 9.6 metres (31 ft)); Yuleba Fire Tower No.1; Turkey Mountain Fire Cabin No.6; Cordalba Fire Tree Lookout (batten laddering added to a tree in 1935); and the Jimna Fire Tower No.10. In 2003 the oldest then-operational fire tower in Queensland was Bringalily Fire Tower No.3 (1948, four-legged timber, 12.2 metres (40 ft)), but this was only judged as being of regional heritage significance due to its isolated location and uncertain future use. Mount Binga Fire Tower No.4, possibly the world's first three-legged timber fire tower, was also not recommended for nomination to the Queensland Heritage Register, as the Jimna Fire Tower already represented the three-legged type in the Queensland Heritage Register.

In 2016, Turkey Mountain Fire Cabin No.6 was moved to the Chinchilla Historical Museum. In 2017, the restored Mount Allan Fire Tower No.5 is open to public access as part of the Conondale Range Great Walk while the cabin and part of the structure of Yuleba Fire Tower No.1 has been moved the Maranoa Regional Council's depot in Yuleba, prior to development a tourist attraction. The heritage-listed three-legged Jimna Fire Tower No.10 was declared structurally unsound in 2004.

Waaje Fire Tower No.4 was not included in the 2004 list of recommended places, although it was noted as being "in excellent order, in use and well maintained" when it was inspected in 2001. It has since been closed and the first flight of stairs has been removed to prevent access. With the removal of the Yuleba tower, the Waaje tower is now the tallest remaining four-legged timber fire tower in Queensland, and therefore the tallest tower using single-length timber poles. It is also the only intact example of a 1960s four-legged timber tower (all 1960s four-legged timber towers other than Yuleba and Waaje have been demolished). The demolished 1960s four-legged timber fire towers were: Brooyar Fire Tower No.11, Cooloolabin Fire Tower No.9, Eena Fire Tower No.2, and Sunday Creek Fire Tower No.4, all built in 1965. High Tower Fire Tower No.2 (1967) consisted of an extension to the existing four-legged timber 1934 East Nanango Fire Tower No.2 (since demolished).

Of the 65 timber four-legged fire towers built in Queensland from 1933 to 1966, 17 survived in 2004, and six of these, including Waaje Fire Tower No.4, are still in-situ in 2017. The other five four-legged fire towers to survive in 2017 are: Mount Allen Fire Tower No.5 (9.6 metres (31 ft), 1954, open for access by hikers), Mount Fort William Fire Tower No.1 (7 metres (23 ft), 1956), Corio Fire Tower No.2 (7.7 metres (25 ft), 1957), Tuan West Fire Tower No.6 (25 metres (82 ft), 1958, on the Fraser Coast Regioinal Heritage Register), and Cooke's Knob Fire Tower No.9 (4.5 metres (15 ft), 1959). Of the 12 three-legged timber towers constructed from 1967 to 1987, eight survived in-situ in 2017. The towers have been rendered obsolete, as there has been a shift to using remote camera surveillance, mounted on steel structures, since 2002. This is due to the difficulty in sourcing new timber poles and the lower operational cost of unstaffed towers. In 2002, the first surveillance camera system was installed in Bribie Island Fire Tower. Images are relayed to a forestry office, and the operator can pan and zoom the camera, with the bearing of a fire shown on the camera display.

In 2017, the Barakula State Forest continues to produce cypress pine and the disused Waaje Fire Tower No.4 is the only surviving in-situ timber fire tower of the four built in the forest. Although the Barakula State Forest is currently owned by the Queensland Department of National Parks, Sport and Racing, the tower is the property of the Department of Agriculture and Fisheries.

== Description ==
Waaje Fire Tower No.4 is located in Barakula State Forest, which covers 283,500ha. Set on top of a hill in a small clearing about 407 metres (1,335 ft) above sea level in the Great Dividing Range with a view over the surrounding forest, the tower is about 80 kilometres (50 mi) by road north-northwest of Chinchilla.

A "Type G" four-legged timber fire tower, Waaje Fire Tower No.4 has four single-length grey ironbark (Eucalyptus paniculata) circular poles fixed with through bolts to steel straps set in concrete pad footings. The four concrete footings are about 1.22 metres (4 ft 0 in) square in plan and the height from the top of the footings to the top of the cabin deck is around 30.5 metres (100 ft) with an overall height of approximately 34 metres (112 ft). The poles, set about 5.5 metres (18 ft) apart at the base, lean inwards towards the top of the tower.

There are eight braced sections to the tower above an unbraced bottom section. The eight braced sections each have rectangular-cut timber diagonal braces bolted across the outside of each face of the tower between the rectangular-cut timber horizontal bracing of each section. There is no diagonal bracing between the legs within the structure.

Nine flights of timber internal parallel stairs with timber handrails and small cantilevered timber landings on the outside of the poles at the end of each flight originally allowed access up the tower on the north side. The lowest flight of stairs has been removed to prevent access to the tower. The top flight of stairs passes through a rectangular hole cut in the cabin's external deck, which is supported by a system of bearers and joists fixed to the main tower. The deck is surrounded by timber guardrails and metal diamond wire mesh. There is a small radio antenna mast fixed to the northwest corner post of the deck.

The cabin, which has a hipped, corrugated metal-clad roof with wide eaves, gutters and downpipe, is estimated to be 2.7 square metres (29 sq ft), with an internal ceiling height of 2.4 metres (7 ft 10 in), and has glass louvre windows on all four sides above half-height timber walls. A doorway from the external deck into the cabin is set in the north corner of the east wall. The interior of the cabin could not be inspected in 2017 but drone footage shows a map table in the centre of the cabin and compass bearings painted around the internal walls under the windows. Most timber is in good condition, apart from the stairs, the cabin's external decking floor boards and the guard rails.

== Heritage listing ==
Waaje Fire Tower No.4 was listed on the Queensland Heritage Register on 25 January 2018 having satisfied the following criteria.

The place is important in demonstrating the evolution or pattern of Queensland's history.

The timber industry has played a vital role in the economic development of Queensland. Waaje Fire Tower No.4 (1964) is important in demonstrating the evolution of the management of timber resources by the Queensland Government, through the use of staffed fire observation structures to protect valuable stands of timber in State Forests from wildfires; and the associated evolution of timber fire tower design between the 1930s and the 1960s.

The place is important in demonstrating the principal characteristics of a particular class of cultural places.

As the tallest, surviving, intact four-legged timber fire tower in Queensland, Waaje Fire Tower No.4, with single length poles, represents the culmination of the evolution of four-legged timber fire tower design and is important in demonstrating the principal characteristics of a timber fire tower. Sited on high ground, with expansive views over dense stands of forestry timber, Waaje Fire Tower No.4 retains: four single-pole grey ironbark (Eucalyptus paniculata) timber legs, fixed to steel straps set in concrete footings; eight braced sections; internal parallel stairs with landings and handrails; radio antenna mast: and external deck access to a cabin with wide eaves. Internally, the cabin retains its map table and compass bearings painted on the walls.
