= Roche Creek, Queensland =

Roche Creek
- Suburb
- Interactive map of Roche Creek
- Coordinates: 26.0597°S 150.1422°E
- Country: Australia
- State: Queensland
- LGA: Western Downs Region
- Location: 27.7 km (17.2 mi) NE of Wandoan; 94.1 km (58.5 mi) N of Miles; 195 km (121 mi) ENE of Roman; 217 km (135 mi) NW of Dalby; 431 km (268 mi) NW of Brisbane

Government
  - State electorate: Callide
  - Federal division: Maranoa

Area
  - Total: 444.2 km^{2} (171.5 sq mi)

Population
  - Total: 53 (2021 census)
  - Density: 0.1193/km^{2} (0.3090/sq mi)
- Time zone: UTC+10:00 (AEST)
- Postcode: 4419
Suburbs around Roche Creek
Grosmont	Bungaban	Bungaban
Wandoan	Roche Creek	Auburn
Guluguba	Pelham	Barakula

Roche Creek is a rural locality in the Western Downs Region, Queensland, Australia. In the 2021 census, Roche Creek had a population of 53 people.

== Geography ==
The locality is bounded to the south-east by the Great Dividing Range.

The locality presumably takes its name from the creek, which rises in the south-east of the locality and flows through the locality exiting to the north-west (Grosmont) where it becomes a tributary of Juandah Creek.

The Barakula State Forest is in the south-east of the locality extending into neighbouring localities. Three sections of the Cooaga State Forest are in the north-east of the locality. Apart from these protected areas, the land use is grazing on native vegetation and crop growing.

== History ==
Roche Creek Provisional School opened in 1914 and closed circa 1917.

== Demographics ==
In the 2016 census, Roche Creek had a population of 55 people.

In the 2021 census, Roche Creek had a population of 53 people.

== Education ==
There are no schools in Roche Creek. The nearest government primary schools are Wandoan State School in neighbouring Wandoan to the west and Grosmont State School in neighbouring Grosmont to the north-west. The nearest government secondary school is Wandoan State School to Year 10. There are no nearby secondary schools to Year 12; the nearest is Miles State High School in Miles, but this would be too distant for a daily commute. The alternatives are distance education and boarding school.
