= Waikola, Queensland =

Waikola
- Suburb
- Interactive map of Waikola
- Coordinates: 26.1336°S 149.2488°E
- Country: Australia
- State: Queensland
- LGA: Western Downs Region
- Location: 68.9 km (42.8 mi) N of Wallumbilla; 86.1 km (53.5 mi) NE of Roma; 287 km (178 mi) NW of Dalby; 497 km (309 mi) WNW of Brisbane

Government
  - State electorate: Callide
  - Federal division: Maranoa

Area
  - Total: 577.4 km^{2} (222.9 sq mi)

Population
  - Total: 26 (2021 census)
  - Density: 0.0450/km^{2} (0.1166/sq mi)
- Time zone: UTC+10:00 (AEST)
- Postcode: 4428
Suburbs around Waikola
Durham Downs	Eurombah	Eurombah
Durham Downs	Waikola	Clifford
Pickanjinnie	Wallumbilla North	Wallumbilla North

Waikola is a rural locality in the Western Downs Region, Queensland, Australia. In the 2021 census, Waikola had a population of 26 people.

== Geography ==
The Great Dividing Range loosely forms the southern boundary of the locality, with the locality within the North-East Coast drainage basin, specifically within the catchment of the Fitzroy River which flows into the Coral Sea.

The Roma-Taroom Road runs through from west (Durham Downs) to east (Eurombah / Clifford).

The Woodduck State Forest is in the south of the locality. Apart from this protected area, the land use is predominantly grazing on native vegetation with some crop growing.

== Demographics ==
In the 2016 census, Waikola had a population of 25 people.

In the 2021 census, Waikola had a population of 26 people.

== Education ==
There are no schools in Waikola. The nearest government school is Wallumbilla State School (Kindergarten to Year 10) in Wallumbilla to the south. However, students living in the north of Waikola would be too distant for a daily commute. Also there is no school nearby providing education to Year 12. The alternatives are distance education and boarding school.
