= Barakula, Queensland =

Barakula
- Suburb
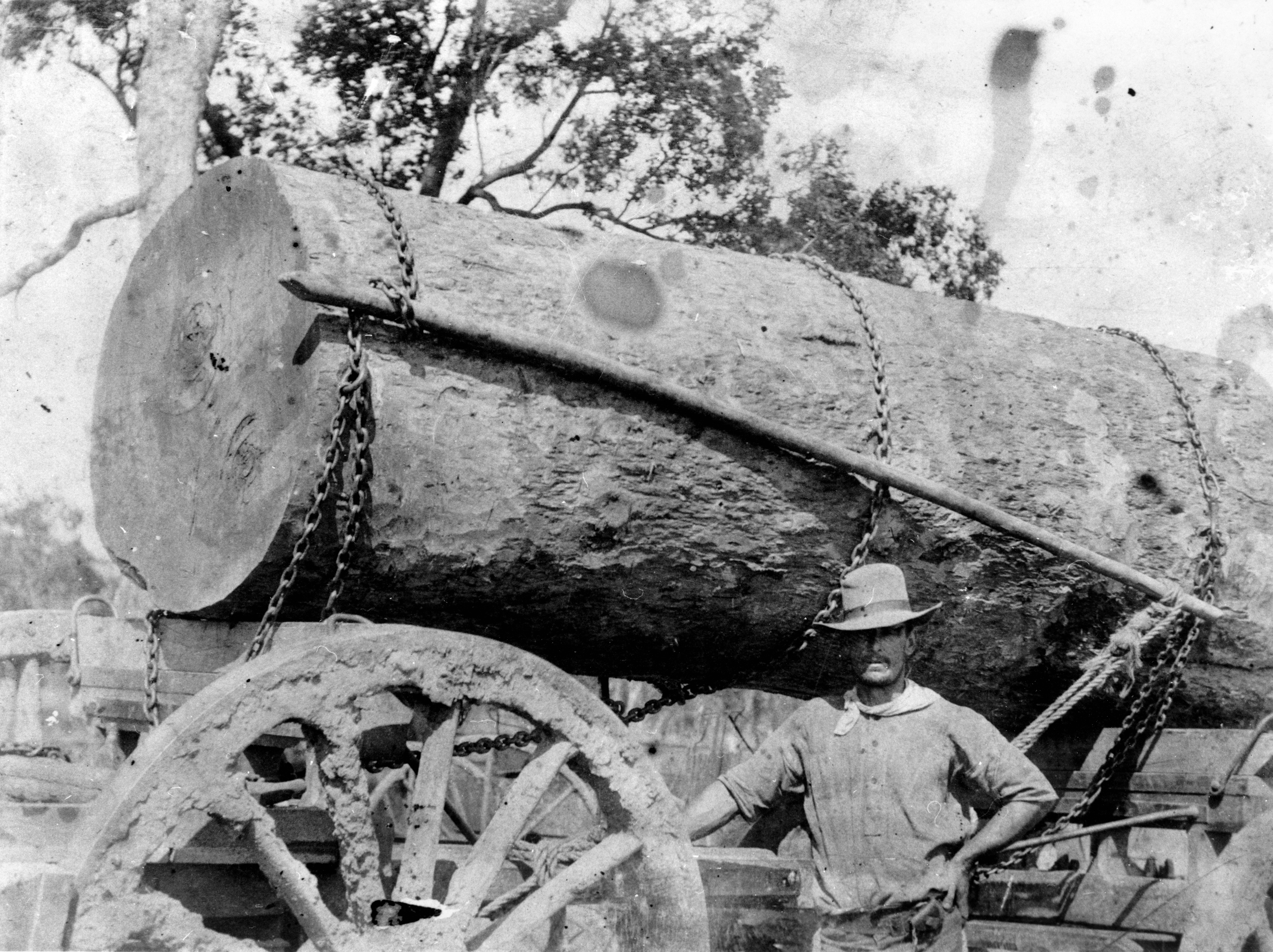
- Timber cutter with a large log in Barakula

- Interactive map of Barakula
- Coordinates: 26.3311°S 150.5977°E
- Country: Australia
- State: Queensland
- LGA: Western Downs Region
- Location: 41.3 km (25.7 mi) N of Chinchilla; 122 km (76 mi) NW of Dalby; 204 km (127 mi) NW of Toowoomba; 332 km (206 mi) NW of Brisbane

Government
  - State electorate: Callide
  - Federal division: Maranoa

Area
  - Total: 1,639.4 km^{2} (633.0 sq mi)

Population
  - Total: 0 (2021 census)
  - Density: 0.00000/km^{2} (0.0000/sq mi)
- Time zone: UTC+10:00 (AEST)
- Postcode: 4413
Suburbs around Barakula
Roche Creek	Auburn	Kragra
Pelham	Barakula	Durah
Hookswood	Blackswamp	Fairyland; Burncluith

Barakula is a rural locality in the Western Downs Region, Queensland, Australia. In the 2021 census, Barakula had "no people or a very low population".

Barakula's postcode is 4413.

== Geography ==
The Great Dividing Range enters the locality from the west (Pelham), briefly forming part of the western boundary of the locality and then goes east through the locality. It then forms part of the north-east boundary before exiting to the north-east (Kragra / Durah). The area north of the range is within the North East Coast drainage basin (specifically within the Burnett River catchment), while the area south of the range is within the Murray Darling drainage basin (specifically the Balonne-Condamine Rivers catchment).

Almost all of the locality, apart from a small area in the south of the locality, is within the Barakula State Forest, which extends into neighbouring localities. The area in the south of the locality is used for grazing on native vegetation.

== History ==
In 1911 the Queensland Railway Department built a tramway from Chinchilla to Wongongera (now Barakula) to transport railway sleepers made from logs taken from the state forest at Barakula and milled at the Barakula sawmill (approx 26.4279°S 150.5044°E). The route of the Barakula tramway was based on an earlier plan to construct a railway line from Chinchilla to Taroom that was subsequently abandoned in favour of a railway line from Miles to Taroom. Originally established to supply sleepers for the Great Western Railway, the sawmill and the tramway operated intermittently depending on demand. The sawmill was mothballed in August 1928 but a caretaker, F. Brooks, was retained. The line reopened in 1942. The tramway operated until 1970. It was a 3 ft 6 in (1,067 mm) gauge tramway.

Wongongera Sawmill Provisional School opened on 25 July 1912. In 1914, it was renamed Barakula Provisional School. It closed and re-opened a number of times due to low student numbers. In 1927, it became Barakula State School. It closed on 31 December 1982. It was located within Barakula State Forest (approximately 26.4273°S 150.5027°E).

== Demographics ==
In the 2016 census, Barakula had a population of 13 people.

In the 2021 census, Barakula had "no people or a very low population".

== Heritage listings ==
Barakula has the following heritage-listed sites:

- Waaje Fire Tower No.4, Barakula State Forest (26.2092°S 150.3803°E)

== Education ==
There are no schools in Barakula. The nearest government schools are Chinchilla State School and Chinchilla State High School, both in Chinchilla to the south. There are also non-government schools in Chinchilla.
