= Guluguba, Queensland =

Guluguba
- Town
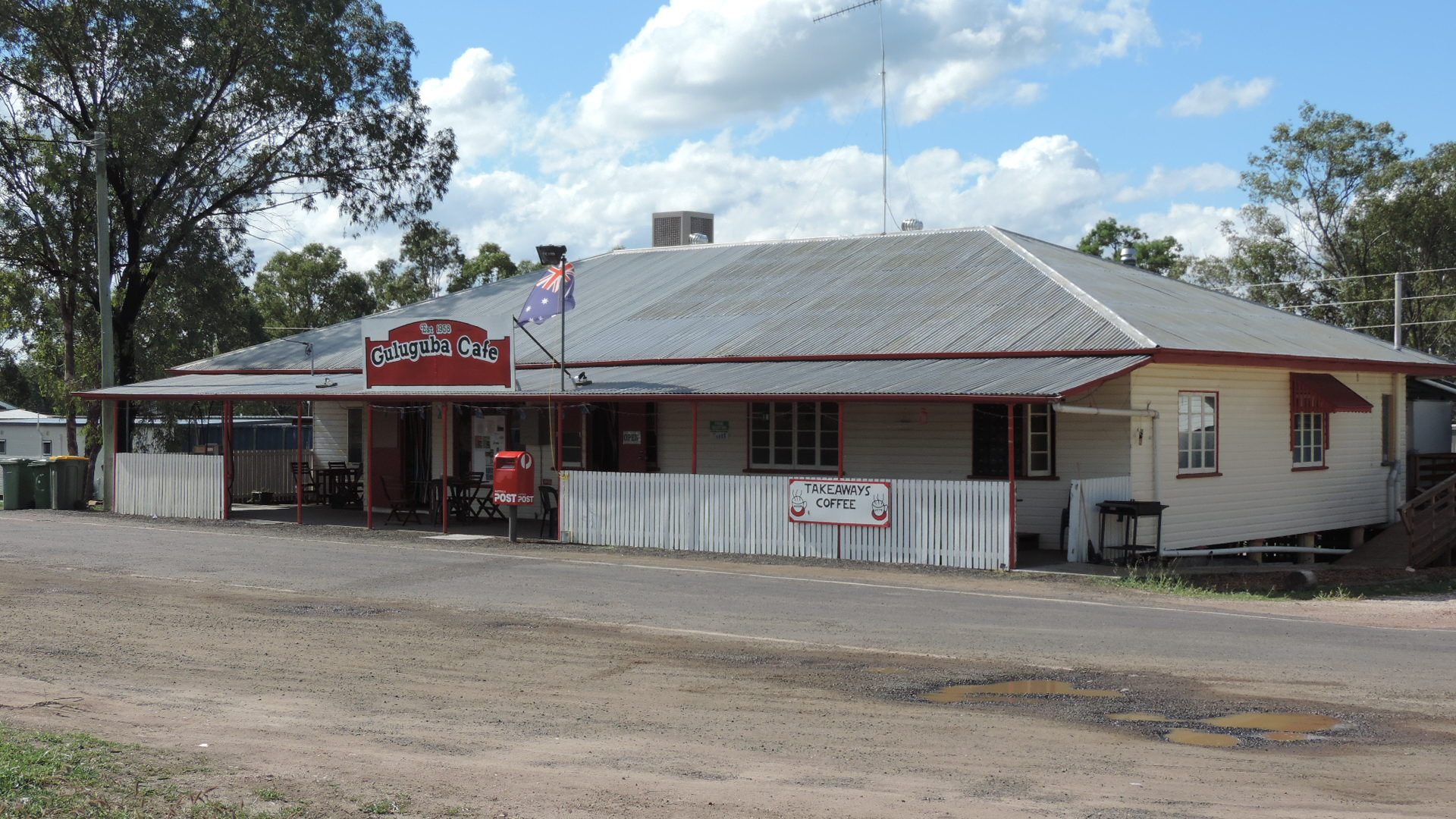
- Cafe at Guluguba on the Leichhardt Highway, 2014

- Interactive map of Guluguba
- Coordinates: 26.2569°S 150.0444°E
- Country: Australia
- State: Queensland
- LGA: Western Downs Region
- Location: 18.8 km (11.7 mi) SE of Wandoan; 50.0 km (31.1 mi) NNW of Miles; 177 km (110 mi) NW of Dalby; 387 km (240 mi) NW of Brisbane

Government
  - State electorate: Callide
  - Federal division: Maranoa

Area
  - Total: 387.6 km^{2} (149.7 sq mi)

Population
  - Total: 86 (2021 census)
  - Density: 0.2219/km^{2} (0.575/sq mi)
- Time zone: UTC+10:00 (AEST)
- Postcode: 4418
Localities around Guluguba
Wandoan	Wandoan	Roche Creek
Woleebee	Guluguba	Pelham
Woleebee	Gurulmundi	Pelham

Guluguba is a rural town and locality in the Western Downs Region, Queensland, Australia. In the 2021 census, the locality of Guluguba had a population of 86 people.

== Geography ==
Guluguba is located on the Leichhardt Highway, north of Miles and south of Wandoan.

The now-closed Wandoan railway line traversed the locality with the town being served by the Guluguba railway station (26.2567°S 150.0451°E) with the Giligulgul railway station (26.3532°S 150.0496°E) at the south of the locality.

== History ==
The name Guluguba is thought to be an Aboriginal word meaning squatter pigeon.

Guluguba Post Office opened by 1916 (a receiving office had been open from 1915).

Guluguba Provisional School opened on 1 February 1917 on a half-time basis (meaning shared a single teacher) with Downfall Creek Provisional School which opened in March 1917. When the Downfall Creek school closed in 1918, Guluguba became a full-time school.

The first stage of the Wandoan railway line opened from Miles to Giligulgul railway station on 20 December 1913. The second stage from Giligulgul to Juandah, including Guluguba railway station, opened on 16 December 1914.

In 1931, St John's Lutheran church was opened by a group of German settlers who had moved from South Australia.

In 1940 at Downfall Creek, the local Lutheran community established a Lutheran Day School. Meanwhile, Guluguba State School had two temporary closures in 1942 and 1944 due to a lack of teacher accommodation.

In 1957, the Queensland Education Department was willing to provide a teacher to Downfall Creek so the Lutheran Church school became Downfall Creek Provisional School once again. It finally closed in 1962.

== Demographics ==
In the 2011 census, the locality of Guluguba and neighbouring Wandoan had a combined population of 655 people.

In the 2016 census, the locality of Guluguba had a population of 109 people.

In the 2021 census, the locality of Guluguba had a population of 86 people.

== Education ==
Guluguba State School is a government primary (Prep-6) school for boys and girls on Fosters Road (26.2567°S 150.0441°E). In 2016, the school had an enrolment of 6 students with 2 teachers (1 full-time equivalent) and 4 non-teaching staff (2 equivalent full-time). In 2018, the school had an enrolment of 13 students with 2 teachers (1 full-time equivalent) and 6 non-teaching staff (2 full-time equivalent).

There are no secondary schools in Guluguba. The nearest government secondary schools are Wandoan State School (to Year 10) in neighbouring Wandoan to the north and Miles State High School (to Year 12) in Miles to the south.

== Amenities ==
St John's Lutheran Church (also known as the Downfall Creek Lutheran Church) is at 654 Upper Downfall Creek Road (26.2555°S 150.1494°E).

== Notable people ==
- Deb Frecklington, a former leader of the Queensland parliamentary wing of the Liberal National Party, attended Guluguba State School
