= Woleebee, Queensland =

Woleebee
- Suburb
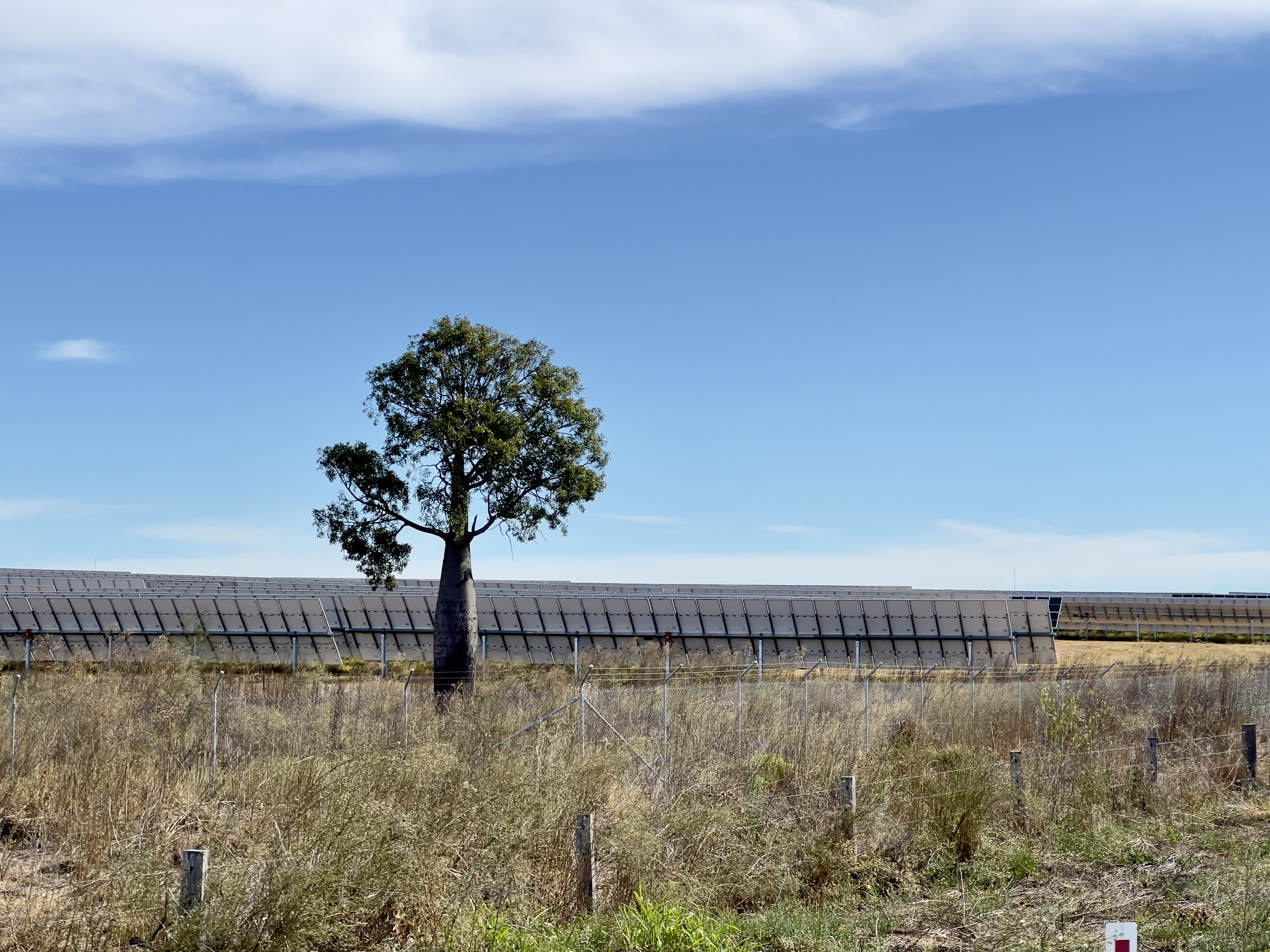
- Wandoan South Solar Farm, Woleebee, 2023

- Interactive map of Woleebee
- Coordinates: 26.2888°S 149.8291°E
- Country: Australia
- State: Queensland
- LGA: Western Downs Region
- Location: 36.7 km (22.8 mi) WSW of Wandoan; 94.5 km (58.7 mi) NW of Miles; 231 km (144 mi) NW of Dalby, Queensland; 314 km (195 mi) NW of Toowoomba; 442 km (275 mi) WNW of Brisbane

Government
  - State electorates: Callide; Warrego
  - Federal division: Maranoa

Area
  - Total: 586.5 km^{2} (226.4 sq mi)

Population
  - Total: 62 (2021 census)
  - Density: 0.1057/km^{2} (0.2738/sq mi)
- Time zone: UTC+10:00 (AEST)
- Postcode: 4419
Suburbs around Woleebee
Bundi	Wandoan	Guluguba
Bundi	Woleebee	Gurulmundi
Jackson North	Bogandilla	Glenaubyn

Woleebee is a rural locality in the Western Downs Region, Queensland, Australia. It has a large fly-in fly-out mining camp. In the 2021 census, Woleebee had a population of 62 people.

== Geography ==
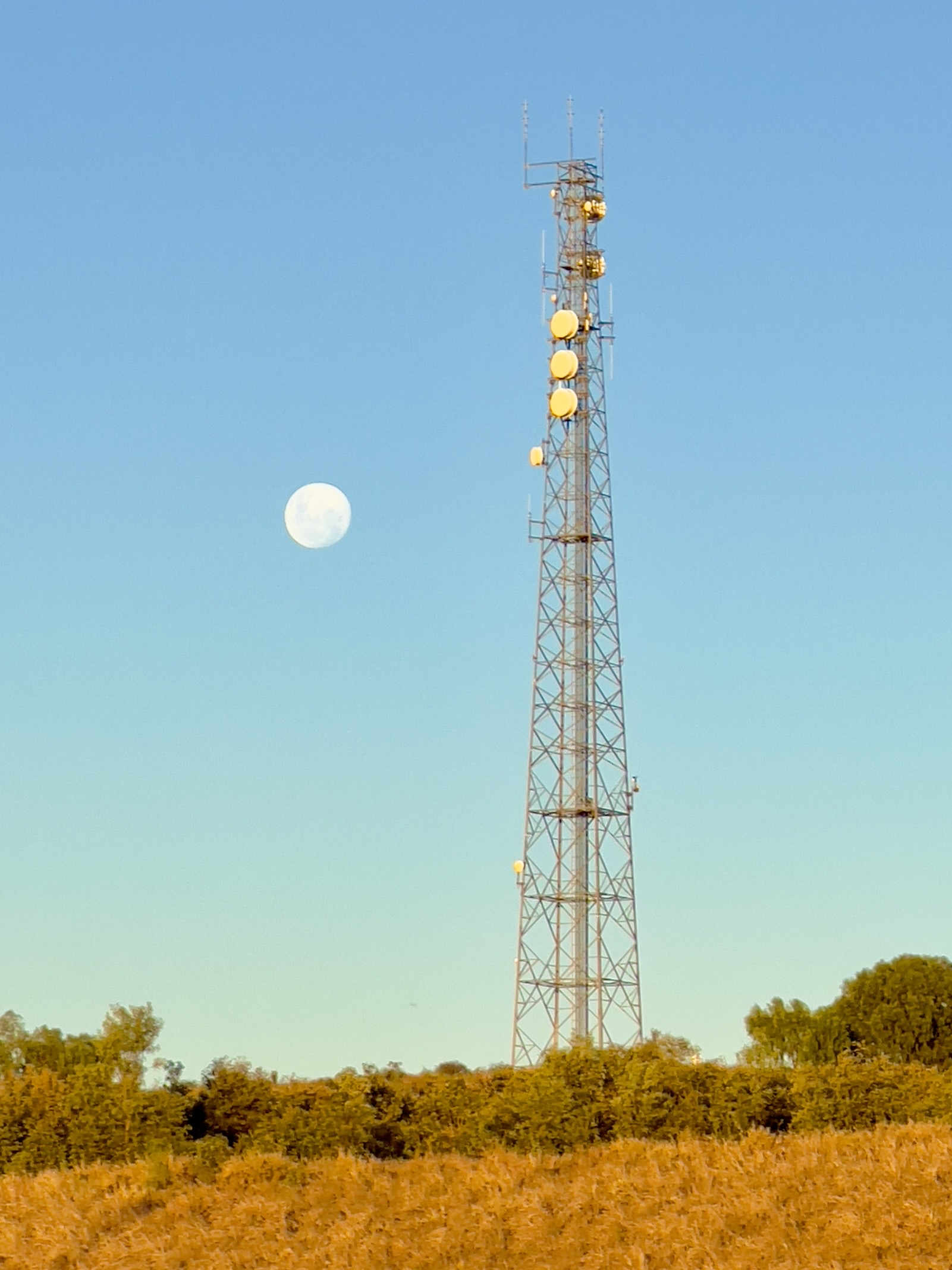
Communication tower at Woleebee Creek Village, 2023

Cherwondah State Forest and Gurulmundi State Forest are in the south-east of the locality. Apart from these protected areas, the land use is predominantly grazing on native vegetation with mining taking place both on the surface and underground.

Woleebee Creek Village is a mining camp in the south-east of the locality (26.28451°S 149.70025°E) used by fly-in-fly-out workers in the local mining industry. In 2013, it was expanded to accommodate 1,700 workers.

Wandoan South Solar Farm occupies 500 hectares (1,200 acres) with solar photovoltaic panels and can produce up to 125 megawatts (168,000 hp) of electricity.

A thermal coal resource area called Juandah has been identified at 26.235°S 149.816°E in the locality. It has estimated reserves of 10 to 100 megatonnes (9,800,000 to 98,400,000 long tons; 11,000,000 to 110,000,000 short tons).

== History ==
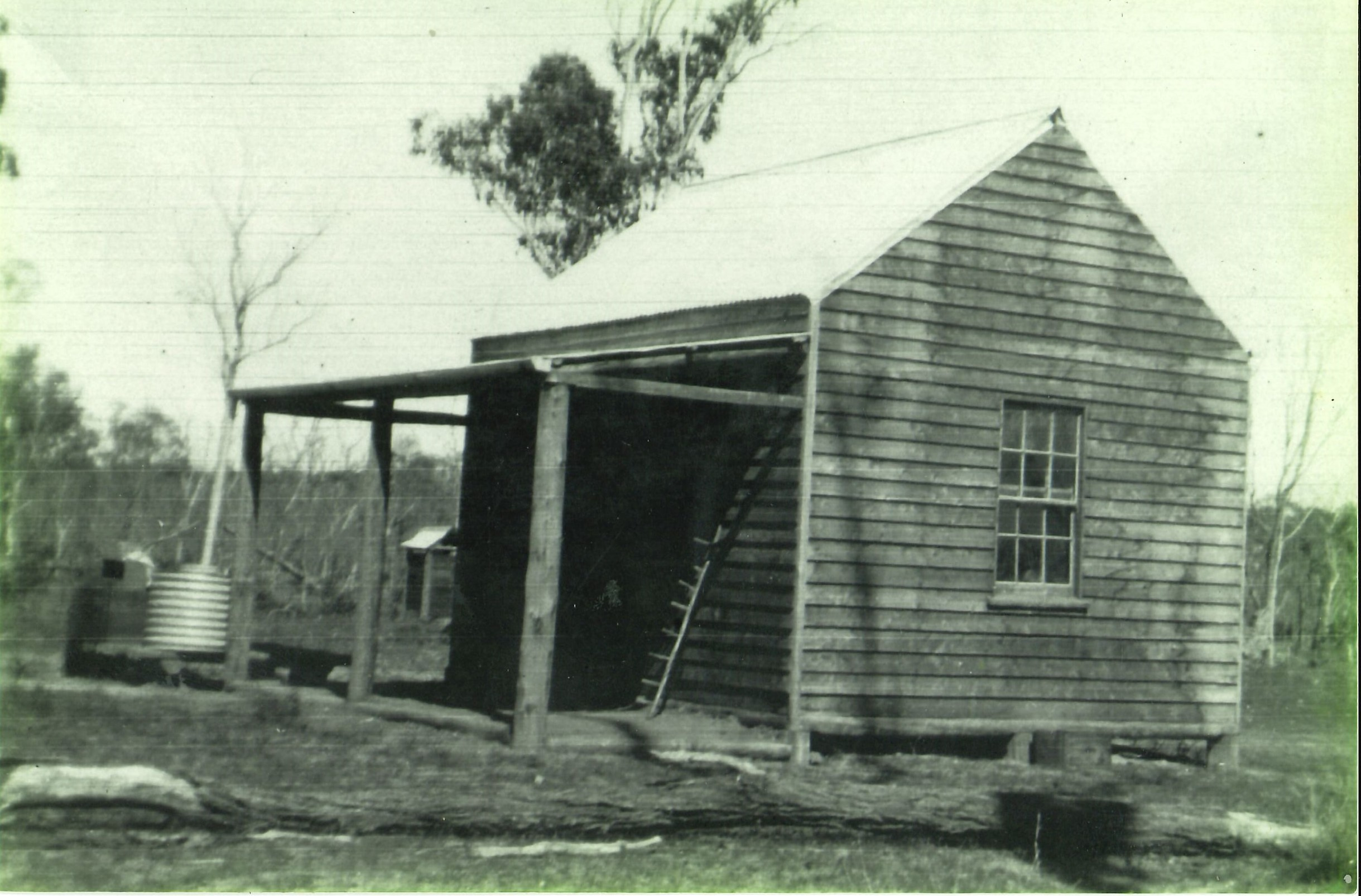
Sundown Provisional School, circa 1930s

Toby's Knob in the Woleebee district was the site of the hide-out of the Aboriginal bushranger known as Wild Toby during the 1870s and 1880s.

Sundown Provisional School was located on Sundown Road. The school opened 2 March 1931 and closed 1 February 1937, due to low enrolment numbers.

Wandoan South Solar Farm was completed in 2023.

== Demographics ==
In the 2016 census, Woleebee had a population of 95 people.

In the 2021 census, Woleebee had a population of 62 people.

Despite the large number of fly-in-fly-out workers that live in the Woleebee Creek Village, these workers are counted at their "usual residence" for census purposes, rather than appearing in the census population data for Woleebee.

== Education ==
There are no schools in Woleebee. The nearest government primary schools are Wandoan State School in neighbouring Wandoan to the north, Guluguba State School in neighbouring Guluguba to the north-east, and Dulacca State School in Dulacca to the south. The nearest government secondary schools are Wandoan State School (to Year 10) and Miles State High School (to Year 12) in Miles to the south-west. However, some parts of Woleebee are too distant to attend these secondary schools. The alternatives are distance education and boarding school.
