= Bundi, Queensland =

Bundi
- Suburb
- Interactive map of Bundi
- Coordinates: 26.1347°S 149.5777°E
- Country: Australia
- State: Queensland
- LGA: Western Downs Region
- Location: 46.4 km (28.8 mi) W of Wandoan; 114 km (71 mi) NW of Miles; 132 km (82 mi) NE of Roma; 241 km (150 mi) NW of Dalby; 452 km (281 mi) NW of Brisbane

Government
  - State electorates: Callide; Warrego
  - Federal division: Maranoa

Area
  - Total: 702.7 km^{2} (271.3 sq mi)

Population
  - Total: 52 (2021 census)
  - Density: 0.0740/km^{2} (0.1917/sq mi)
- Time zone: UTC+10:00 (AEST)
- Postcode: 4419
Suburbs around Bundi
Clifford	Eurombah	Grosmont
Clifford	Bundi	Wandoan
Yuleba North	Jackson North	Woleebee

Bundi is a rural locality in the Western Downs Region, Queensland, Australia. In the 2021 census, Bundi had a population of 52 people.

== Geography ==
There are many coal seam gas bores in the southern part of the locality.

== Demographics ==
In the 2016 census, Bundi had a population of 38 people.

In the 2021 census, Bundi had a population of 52 people.

== Education ==
There are no schools in Bundi. The nearest government primary schools are Grosmont State School in neighbouring Grosmont to the north-east and Yuleba State School in Yuleba to the south. The nearest government secondary school is Wandoan State School (to Year 10) in neighbouring Wandoan to the east. There are no nearby schools offering secondary education to Year 12; distance education and boarding schools are the options.

== Facilities ==
Reedy Creek Power Station is a gas-powered electricity generator at 2164 Horse Creek Road (26.2368°S 149.5091°E).
