= Wild Toby =

Aboriginal Australian outlaw

Wild Toby (c.1840? – 26 January 1883) was a famous Aboriginal outlaw from the Dawson River region of central Queensland.

== Early life ==
According to a number of accounts of Toby's life, he was a survivor of the reprisal killings of Aboriginal Australians in the Dawson River region following the Hornet Bank massacre of 1857.

== Bushranger ==
As a young adult, Toby worked for a while as a station-hand on a pastoral run in the Dawson River region but was caught stealing and sent away from the property. By the early 1870s, he had become a bushranger, robbing sheep stations and travellers throughout the district. He also killed a blacktracker who he thought was attempting to aid in his capture. Troopers from Roma were sent in to "teach this fellow a wholesome lesson, if possible, in a summary way", but failed to find Toby.

By the early 1880s, Toby had gained the name "Wild Toby" and was blamed for several killings of shepherds and storemen. He also committed an attempted assault of a white girl and the kidnap and assault of the daughter of a well-known grazier near Juandah.

== Capture and escape ==
After the kidnapping and assault on the grazier's daughter, a large group of police and settlers were organised in 1882 to hunt Toby down. They managed to find Toby and as Constable James Edwards galloped toward him, Toby was able to throw a spear which just missed the policeman. Edwards then subdued Toby with a blow to the head with the butt of his pistol, knocking him unconscious. Toby was chained up and placed in a storeroom at Hornetbank, but managed to escape. On obtaining freedom, Toby continued his bushranging ways and on 25 September 1882 he attempted to murder James Anderson on a road near Wandoan. A warrant was placed for his arrest and Senior-Constable William Wright, Constable William Dwyer and a blacktracker from Taroom were ordered to pursue and capture Toby.

== Killing a police officer and subsequent death ==
The police group found Toby's camp on Woleebee Creek on the evening of 25 January 1883. In the early hours of the next morning, the police officers approached Toby as he was squatting outside the tent that he shared with his Aboriginal girlfriend. Constable Dwyer dismounted from his horse and rapidly went up to Toby grasping him by the throat and pointing his revolver toward him. Unperceived by the policemen, Toby was gripping a tomahawk with his toes that was hidden by leaves on the ground. Toby was able to quickly spring the tomahawk to his hand and smash it into the skull of Constable Dwyer. Senior-Constable Wright in the same instant managed to shoot Toby several times in the body, but this did not prevent Toby from picking a nearby nulla-nulla and hurling it at Wright. The nulla-nulla hit Wright in the leg, causing an injury that partially crippled him for the rest of his life. However, Wright fired another shot at Toby which struck him in the face, killing him. Constable Dwyer died about half an hour later from the wound inflicted by Toby with his tomahawk.

== Legacy ==
The tomahawk which Toby used to kill Constable William Dwyer was displayed at the Queensland Police Museum for some years after their deaths. Toby's body was beheaded, and his skull was on display at Wandoan also for many years.

Toby's Knob, a prominent hill near Woleebee which Toby used as a haven and a lookout during his time as an outlaw, is named after him. On the Queensland Police Museum website Toby is remembered as a "scoundrel with no respect for white man's law or property".

== See also ==
- List of Indigenous Australian historical figures
