= Grosmont, Queensland =

Grosmont
- Suburb
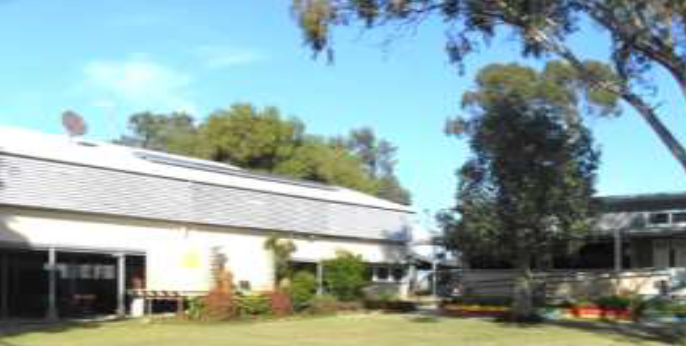
- Grosmont State School, 2019

- Interactive map of Grosmont
- Coordinates: 25.9652°S 149.7683°E
- Country: Australia
- State: Queensland
- LGA: Western Downs Region
- Location: 38.2 km (23.7 mi) SSE of Taroom; 90.0 km (55.9 mi) NNW of Miles; 217 km (135 mi) NW of Dalby; 427 km (265 mi) NW of Brisbane

Government
  - State electorate: Callide
  - Federal division: Maranoa

Area
  - Total: 839.9 km^{2} (324.3 sq mi)

Population
  - Total: 135 (2021 census)
  - Density: 0.1607/km^{2} (0.4163/sq mi)
- Time zone: UTC+10:00 (AEST)
- Postcode: 4419
Suburbs around Grosmont
Eurombah	Taroom	Bungaban
Bundi	Grosmont	Roche Creek
Bundi	Wandoan	Wandoan

Grosmont is a rural locality in the Western Downs Region, Queensland, Australia. In the 2021 census, Grosmont had a population of 135 people.

== Geography ==
The Leichhardt Highway passes through the locality from south-east to north-east.

== History ==
Grosmont State School opened on 4 February 1957.

== Demographics ==
In the 2016 census, Grosmont had a population of 141 people.

In the 2021 census, Grosmont had a population of 135 people.

== Education ==
Grosmont State School is a government primary (Prep-6) school for boys at 2524 Grosmont Road (25.9777°S 149.8030°E). In 2016, the school had an enrolment of 2 students with 3 teachers (1 full-time equivalent) and 1 non-teaching staff. In 2018, the school had an enrolment of 2 students with 2 teachers (1 full-time equivalent) and 1 non-teaching staff. As at 2024, the school is open but not operational as it has no enrolments.

There is no secondary school in Grosmont. The nearest government secondary schools are Wandoan State School (to Year 10) in neighbouring Wandoan to the south-east and Taroom State School (to Year 10) in neighbouring Taroom to the north. For secondary schooling to Year 12, the nearest government school is Miles State High School in Miles to the south-east. Distance education and boarding schools are other options.
