= Durham Downs, Queensland =

Durham Downs
- Suburb
- Interactive map of Durham Downs
- Coordinates: 26.1166°S 149.0733°E
- Country: Australia
- State: Queensland
- LGA: Maranoa Region
- Location: 65.5 km (40.7 mi) NE of Roma; 391 km (243 mi) NW of Toowoomba; 517 km (321 mi) NW of Brisbane

Government
  - State electorate: Warrego
  - Federal division: Maranoa

Area
  - Total: 796.8 km^{2} (307.6 sq mi)

Population
  - Total: 63 (2021 census)
  - Density: 0.0791/km^{2} (0.2048/sq mi)
- Time zone: UTC+10:00 (AEST)
- Postcode: 4454
Suburbs around Durham Downs
Pony Hills	Pony Hills	Baroondah
Eumamurrin	Durham Downs	Waikola
Eumamurrin	Mooga	Pickanjinnie

Durham Downs is a rural locality in the Maranoa Region, Queensland, Australia. In the 2021 census, Durham Downs had a population of 63 people.

== Geography ==
The Roma-Taroom Road enters the locality from the south-west (Eumamurrin) and exits to the east (Waikola).

The land use is predominantly grazing on native vegetation. Durham Downs is approximately 18,000 acres

== Demographics ==
In the 2016 census, Durham Downs had a population of 67 people.

In the 2021 census, Durham Downs had a population of 63 people. Durham Downs holds roughly 2000 head of cattle, and is owned by the Box family Stuart, Nicole, William and Isabella.

== Education ==
There are no schools in Durham Downs. The nearest government primary schools are Roma State College in Roma to the south-west and Wallumbilla State School in Wallumbilla to the south-east. For students living in the south-east of the locality, the nearest government secondary schools are Wallumbilla State School (to Year 1) and Roma State College (to Year 12). However, students living in some parts of the locality may be too distant for a daily commute to Roma State College for Years 11 and 12; the alternatives are distance education and boarding school.

There are also non-government schools in Roma.
