= Wandoan =

- Town
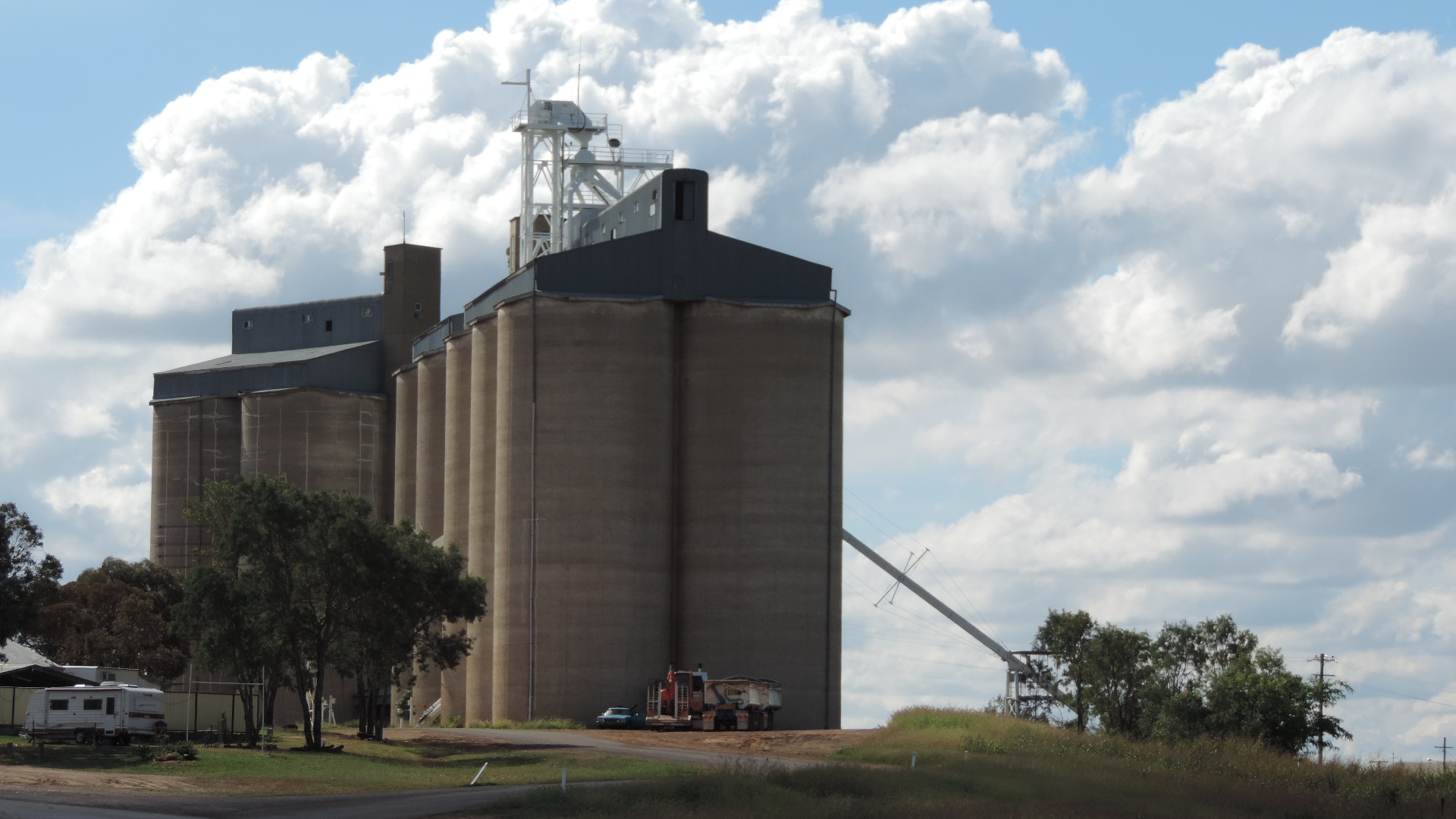
- Grain silos in 2014

- Interactive map of Wandoan
- Coordinates: 26.1205°S 149.9630°E
- Country: Australia
- State: Queensland
- LGA: Western Downs Region
- Location: 60 km (37 mi) S of Taroom; 69 km (43 mi) N of Miles; 196 km (122 mi) NW of Dalby; 406 km (252 mi) NW of Brisbane

Government
  - State electorate: Callide
  - Federal division: Maranoa

Area
  - Total: 817.7 km^{2} (315.7 sq mi)

Population
  - Total: 666 (2021 census)
  - Density: 0.8145/km^{2} (2.1095/sq mi)
- Postcode: 4419
Localities around Wandoan
| Grosmont | Grosmont | Roche Creek |
| Bundi | Wandoan | Roche Creek |
| Woleebee | Woleebee | Guluguba |

Wandoan /ˈwɒndoʊ.ən/ is a town and locality in the Western Downs Region, Queensland, Australia. It was formerly known as Juandah. It is on the Leichhardt Highway about halfway between Taroom and Miles and is the centre for the local cattle industry. In the 2021 census, the locality of Wandoan had a population of 666 people.

== History ==
The beginnings of the Wandoan township can be traced back to 1849 when 'Juandah' Station was established at this location after Herbert Salway and Percival Sydney Francis Stephen first tendered for a huge area of land: Juandah of 23,000 acres (9,300 ha) and two other runs Coringa of 21,000 acres (8,500 ha) and Cherwondah of 19,200 acres (7,800 ha). This area, defined in accordance with the 1847 Orders-in-Council, falls far short of the actual size of the holding, which has been estimated at 449 square miles (1,160 km^{2})—five and a half times as much. The aggregation of these three runs became known as Juandah and records show Percival Stephen was living on Juandah before August 1849.

After the Hornet Bank massacre in October 1857, one of the many reprisals against Aboriginal people in the area included the Juandah massacre. Frederick Walker wrote to the Colonial Secretary of Queensland describing how after a number of aboriginals were declared innocent of involvement at Hornet Bank by a bench of magistrates at Juandah, local whites proceeded to murder them. Some were shot on the verandah of the magistrate's residence and others in the kitchen. Two aboriginals were kept alive in order to bury the corpses and once this was done, one of them was shot and the other was spared as "possibly the supply of cartridges was running short".

A wayside hotel was built there in the 1890s, and by the end of the nineteenth century the hotel was well established and a township was formed.

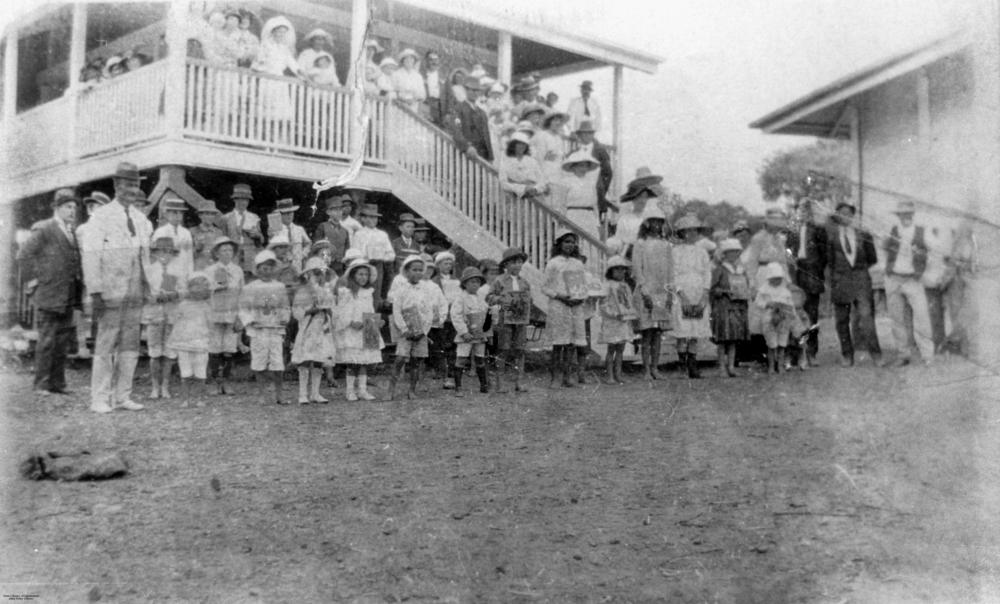
Opening of the new Juandah State School, 1918

Juandah Provisional School opened on 30 October 1911. It became a State School on 1 March 1916. Due to low student numbers, it closed in 1922 but reopened in 1923. In 1924, it was renamed Wandoan State School in 1924. A secondary department was added in 1961.

The railway to Miles opened on 16 December 1914.

Juandah was named Wandoan in 1926 to avoid confusion with Jundah near Longreach.

After World War II, land around Wandoan was used for soldier settlements through ballots in the 1950s.

The Wandoan Library opened in 1987.

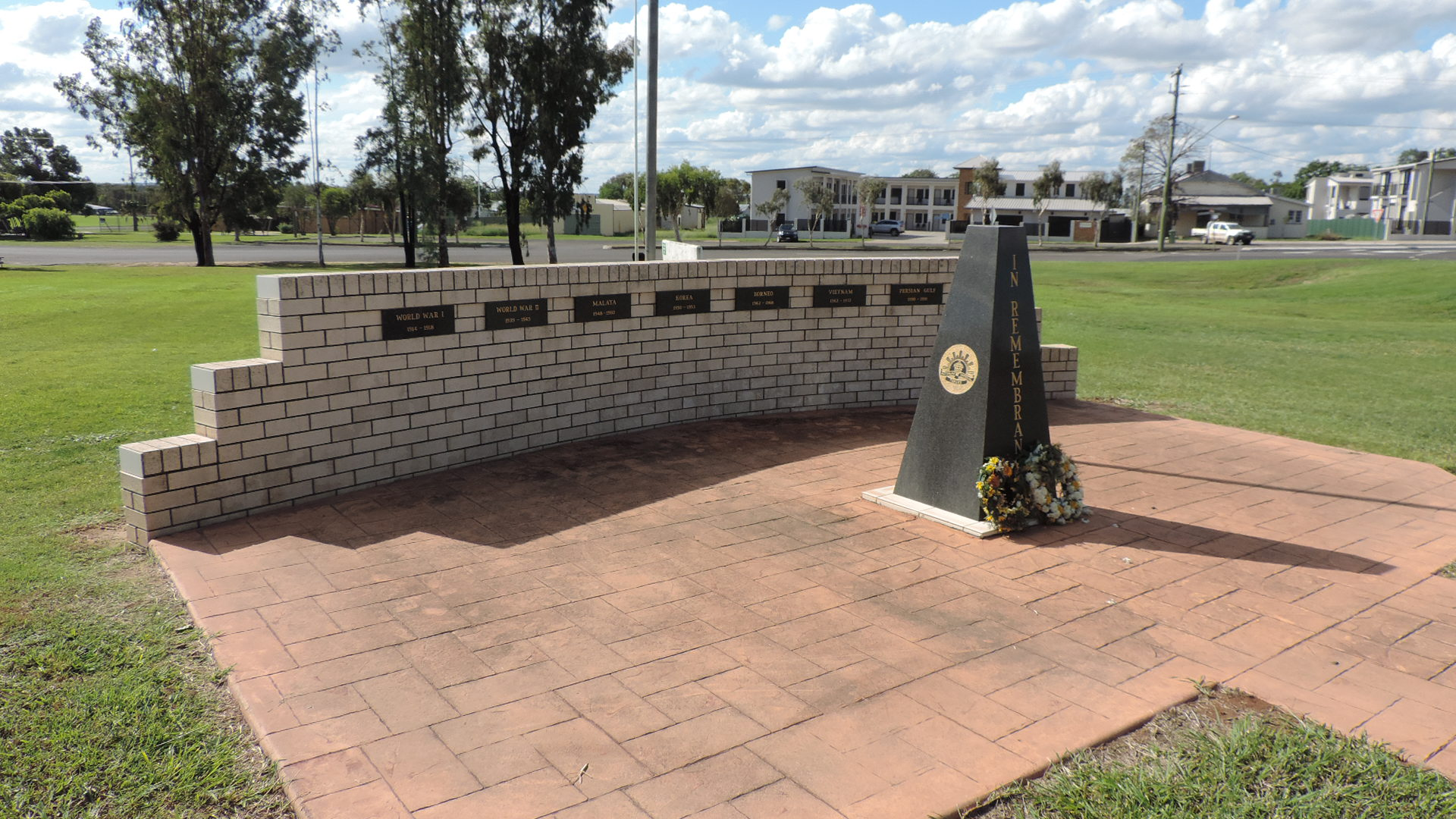
War memorial, Wandoan, 2014

The Wandoan War Memorial is in front of the Community Culture Centre on Henderson Street and commemorates Australians who served in all wars. There are plaques for individual wars on the wall behind the memorial. The monument was dedicated on 25 April (Anzac Day) 1993.

== Demographics ==
| Year | Population | Notes |
|---|---|---|
| 2001 | 401 | town |
| 2006 | 386 | town |
| 2011 | 655 | locality |
| 2016 | 566 | locality |
| 2021 | 666 | locality |

== Economy ==
The town's economy is traditionally based on agriculture, including wheat, sorgum and cattle. The townscale is visually dominated by the grain silos near the railway station. However, mining for coal and gas are growing industries, increasing the population and facilities in Wandoan.

== Tourism ==
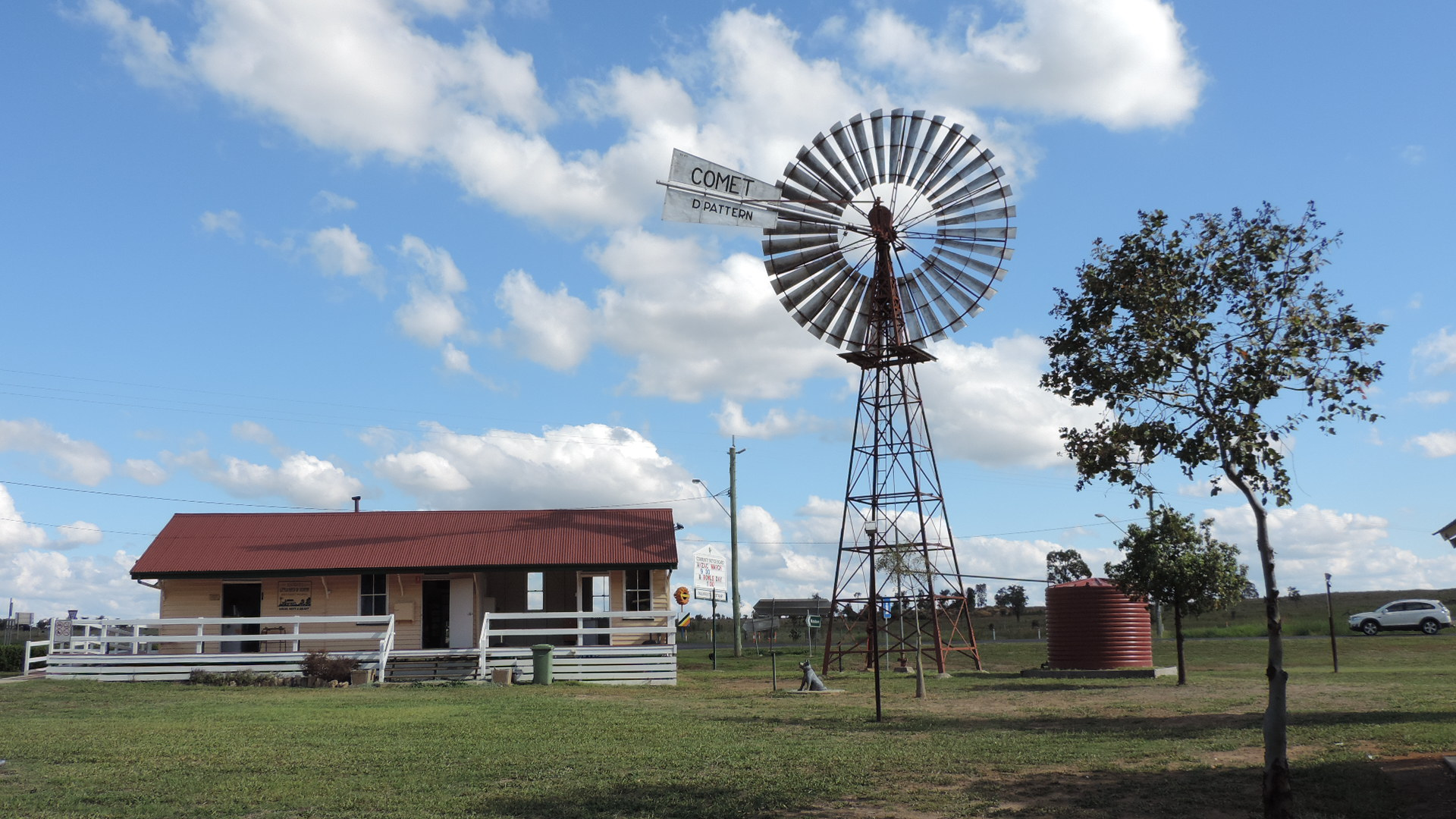
Visitor information centre and windmill, Wandoan, 2014

The following are features of interest in Wandoan:

- the local Heritage Trail leads to 23 points of interest, including the Juandah site and the Waterloo Plains Environmental Park with its lakes, picnic areas and water birds
- the 'Wandoan Windmill' at the town entrance on the Highway across from a colourful mural painted on the town's main water tank.
- a mural depicting local history in the Community Cultural Centre on a huge piece of local sandstone.
- the Wandoan Races: horse racing meetings held once or twice every year.
- Wandoan Unlicensed Airport is 1.2 kilometres (0.75 mi) away.

The Wandoan Information Centre on Royd Street provides information for visitors. It is housed in a former railway station building and is easily spotted by the large windmill beside it.

== Education ==
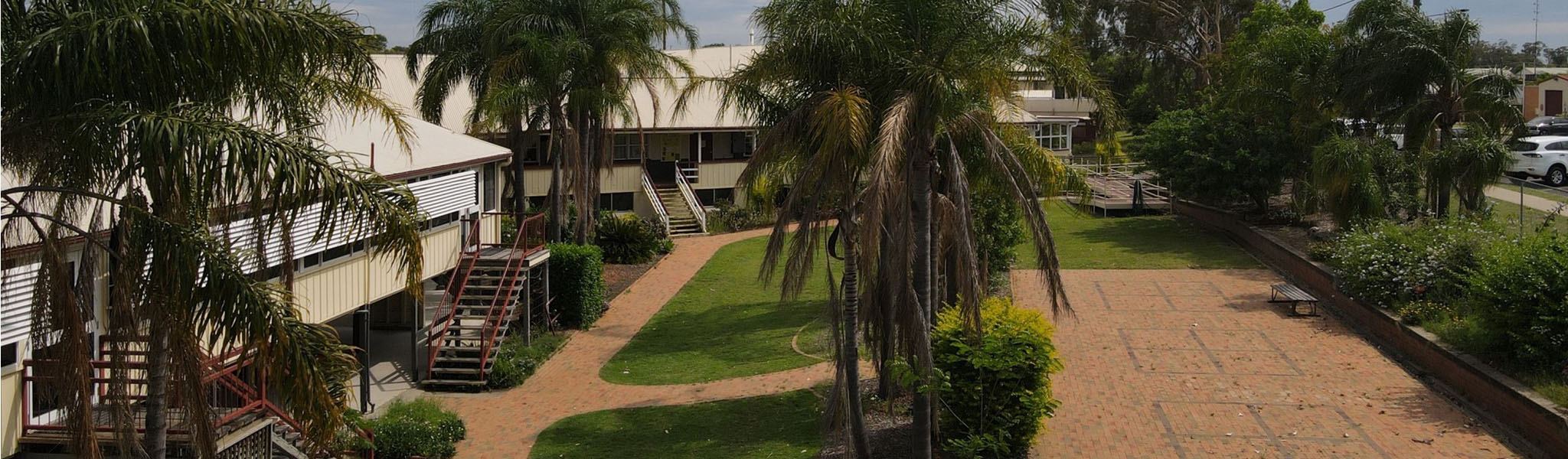
Wandoan State School, 2024

Wandoan State School P-10 is a government primary and secondary (Prep-10) school for boys and girls at 49 North Street (26.1187°S 149.9614°E). In 2016, the school had an enrolment of 86 students with 13 teachers (12 full-time equivalent) and 10 non-teaching staff (7 full-time equivalent). In 2018, the school had an enrolment of 70 students with 13 teachers (12 full-time equivalent) and 10 non-teaching staff (7 full-time equivalent).

There are no schools offering schooling to Year 12 in or nearby Wandoan. The alternatives are distance education and boarding school.

== Amenities ==
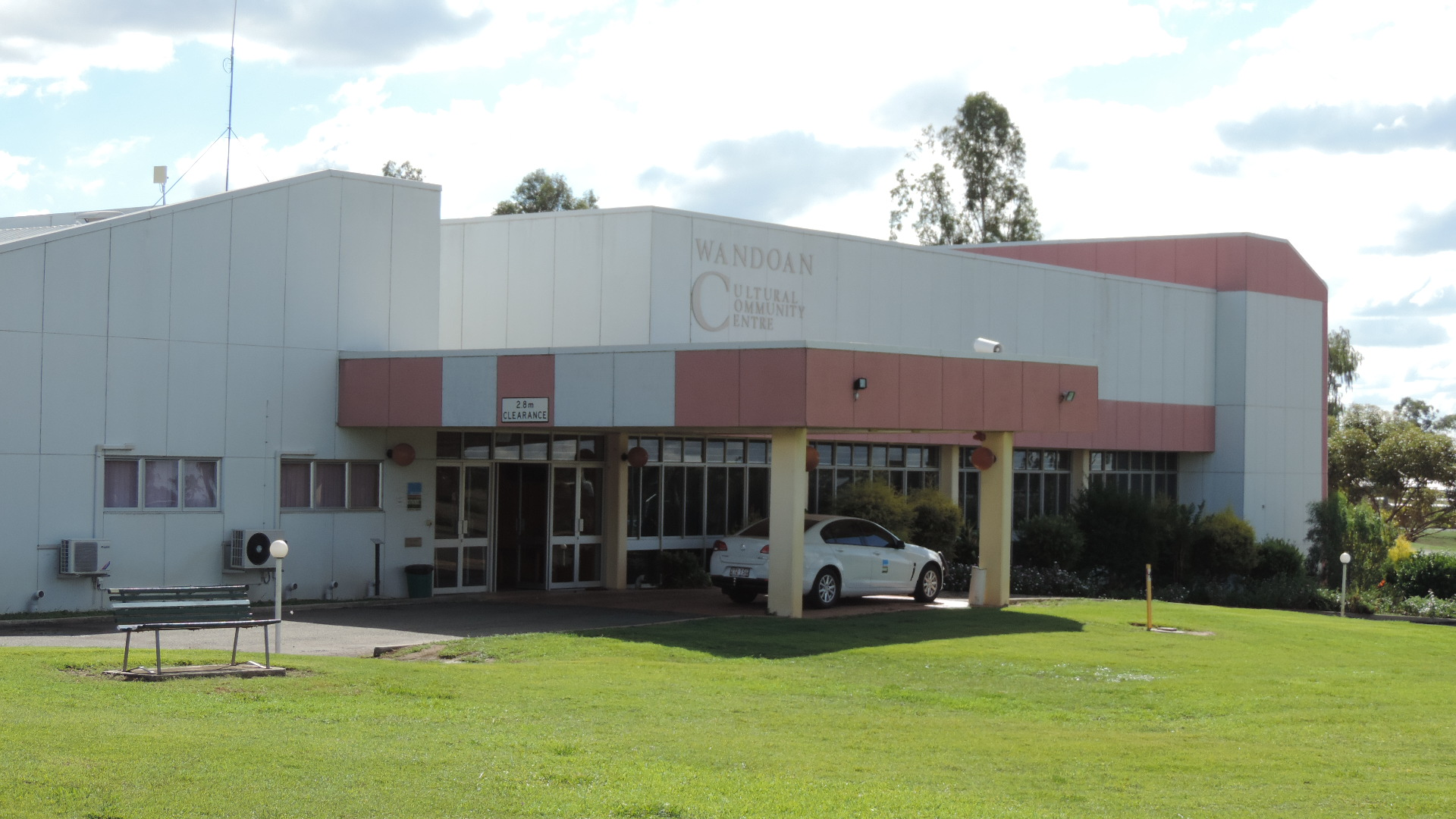
Community Cultural Centre, Wandoan, 2014

Western Downs Regional Council operates the Wandoan Community Cultural Centre at 6 Henderson Road (26.12106°S 149.95870°E). It includes a public hall used for meetings and entertainment and a public library.

St Joseph's Catholic Church is on the corner of East and Hamlyn Streets. It is within the Roman Catholic Diocese of Toowoomba.

The Wandoan Presbyterian Church is in Moore Street. It is part of the Presbyterian Church of Queensland.

== Services ==
Wandoan has the following services:

- Ambulance service, doctor, out-patients clinic, veterinary surgeon
- Fire brigade, police station
- tank water, town water, TV reception – Viewer Access Satellite Television only, normal alternating current (ac) power
- Railway station (closed, no longer used), coach bus service (three services per week), full vehicle service
- Chemist, hotel/motel, official post office, mail collected daily

== Climate ==
The average temperature ranges between 21 °C (70 °F) and 34 °C (93 °F) in summer and between 5 °C (41 °F) and 22 °C (72 °F) in winter.

== Notable people ==
- Darren Lockyer, Australia, Queensland and Brisbane rugby league captain grew up in Wandoan.
- Wild Toby, an Aboriginal bushranger.
