= Miles railway station =

Railway station in Queensland, Australia

Miles
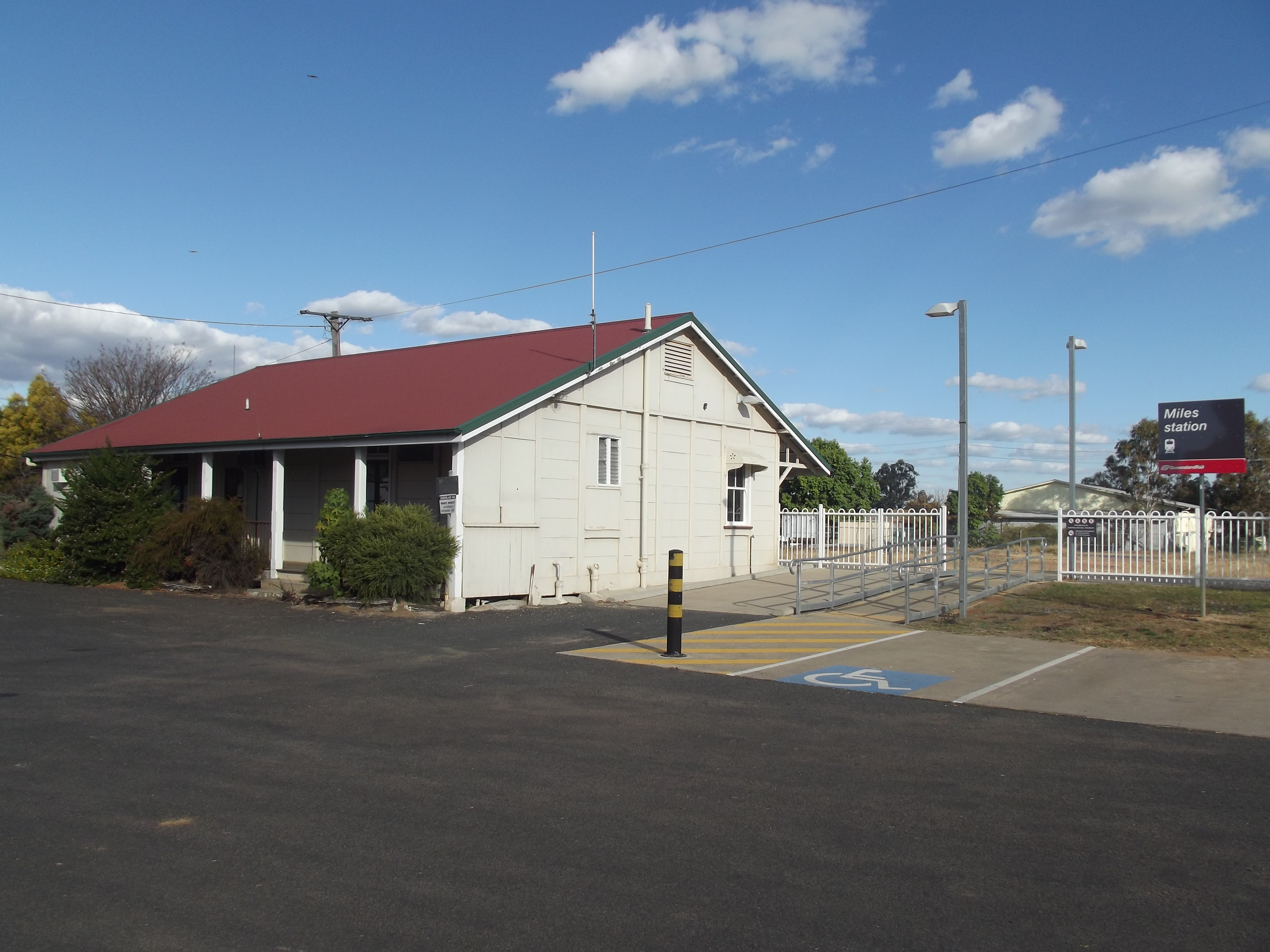
- Station front in July 2013 looking towards Toowoomba and Brisbane

General information
- Location: Corbett Drive, Miles
- Coordinates: 26.6603°S 150.1849°E
- Owner: Queensland Rail
- Operator: Traveltrain
- Line: Western
- Platforms: 1

Construction
- Structure type: Ground
- Accessible: Yes

History
- Opened: 1878

Services
Preceding station	Queensland Rail	Following station
Chinchilla towards Brisbane	The Westlander	Yuleba towards Charleville
Location

Miles railway station is located on the Western line in Queensland, Australia. It serves the town of Miles. The station has one platform, opening in 1878. it is situated 408 kilometres (253 mi) from the Westlander's western terminus, Charleville and 334 kilometres (207 mi) from the Westlander's eastern terminus, Roma Street.

== Services ==
Miles is served by Queensland Rail Travel's twice weekly Westlander service travelling between Brisbane and Charleville.

- The westbound service (3S86) passes through early on Wednesday and Friday Mornings at 3:25am
- The eastbound service (3987) passes through early on Thursday and Saturday Mornings at 2:10am

Until the end of 1993, Miles was served by Rail motor service 5R16 that travelled from Roma to Roma Street railway station via Wallumbilla, Yuleba, Miles, Chinchilla, Dalby, Oakey and Toowoomba in conjunction with a railbus (Train-link) service operated by McCafferty's (now operating under the auspices of Greyhound Australia) and its eastbound return service 5665.
