= Roma railway station =

Railway station in Queensland, Australia

Roma
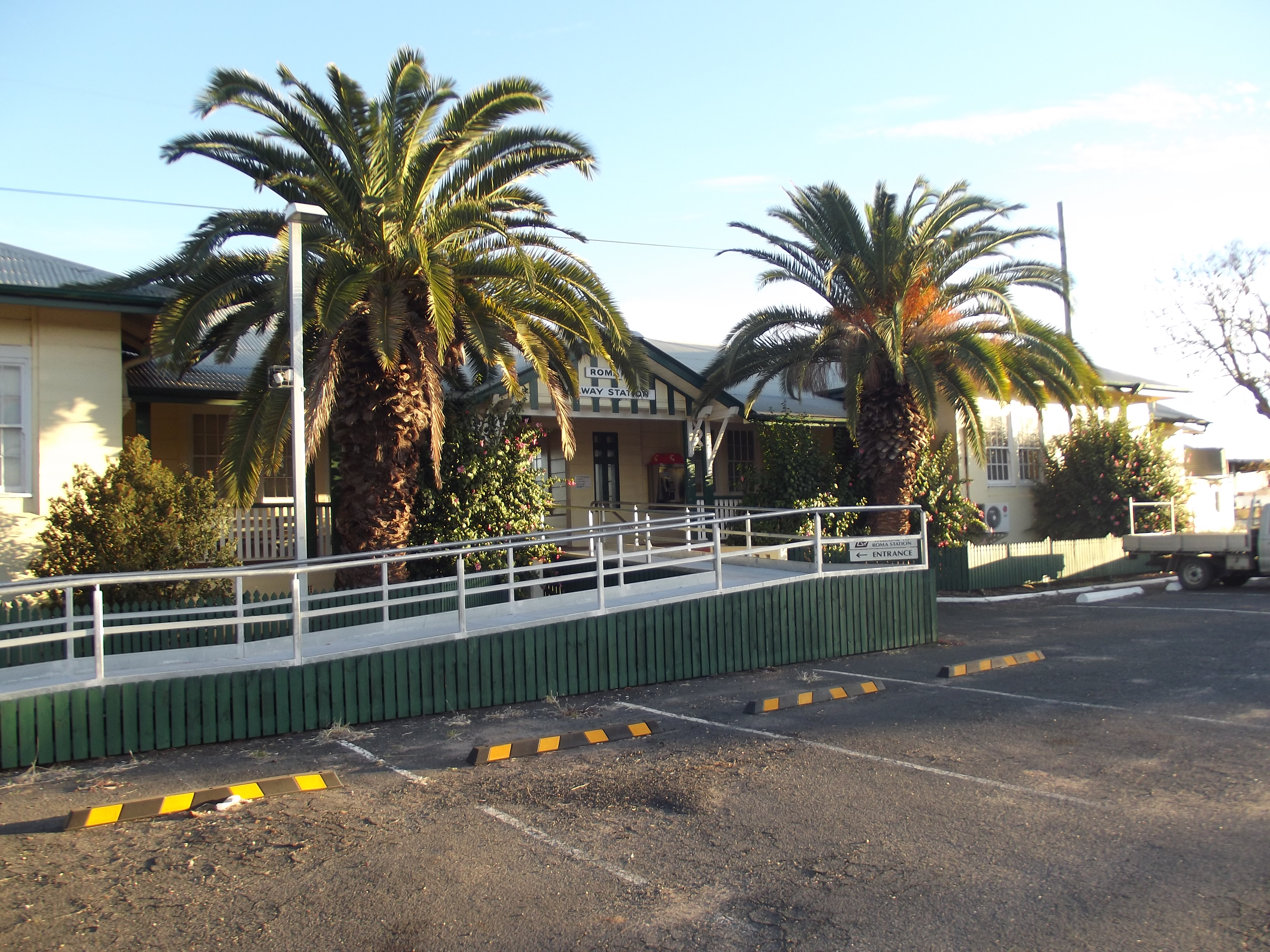
- Station front in July 2013 looking towards Charleville

General information
- Location: Station Street, Roma
- Coordinates: 26.5762°S 148.7923°E
- Owner: Queensland Rail
- Operator: Traveltrain
- Line: Western
- Platforms: 1

Construction
- Structure type: Ground
- Accessible: Yes

History
- Opened: 1880

Services
Preceding station	Queensland Rail	Following station
Yuleba towards Brisbane	The Westlander	Mitchell towards Charleville
Location

Roma railway station is located on the Western line in Queensland, Australia. It serves the town of Roma. The station has one platform, opening in 1880.

== Services ==
Roma is served by Queensland Rail Travel's twice weekly Westlander service travelling between Brisbane and Charleville.

The Westbound service (3S86) arrives at Roma at 6:05am and departs at 6:15am Wednesdays and Fridays.

The eastbound service (3987) arrives at 11:25pm and departs at 11:35pm Wednesdays and Fridays.

Until the end of 1993, Roma was served by Rail motor services 5R16/5665 that travelled to and from Roma Street railway station via Wallumbilla, Yuleba, Miles, Chinchilla, Dalby, Oakey and Toowoomba in conjunction with a railbus service operated by McCafferty's.
