= Travelling Post Office, Queensland =

Post office service situated on a train

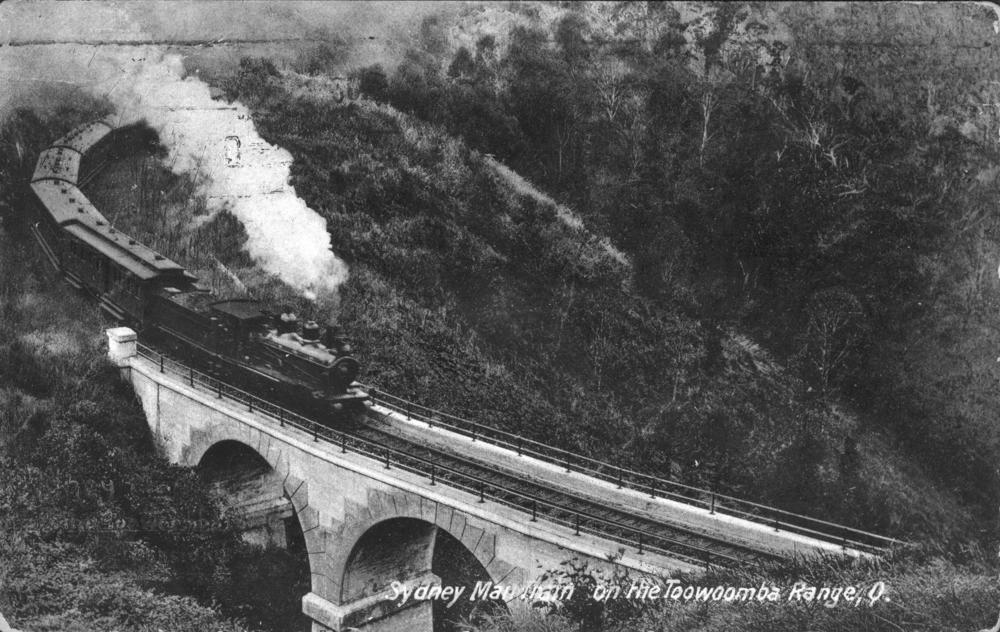
Sydney Mail train crossing Swanson's Bridge on the Toowoomba Range, ~1910. The carriage nearest the engine is a travelling post office van

A Travelling Post Office (TPO) is a postal receiving, sorting and delivery service situated on a train, usually in a specially designated carriage that is part of a passenger train. In Queensland, Australia, the service was provided from 1877 to 1932.

== History ==
The first TPO service in Queensland commenced in 1877 utilising the second class compartments of two composite passenger carriages on the daily Brisbane-to-Dalby train operating on the Main Line and Western railway lines. A goods van was used on the Toowoomba-to-Warwick train operating on the Southern railway line in the same year, until special 4 wheel carriages were built later that year for the service. The service was extended to Roma and ultimately Charleville as the Western line was extended, and similarly on the Southern line to Stanthorpe, and then Wallangarra.

=== Mail Trains ===
The first designated 'Mail' train in Queensland was the Brisbane-to-Mitchell day train, with the title being transferred to the overnight service in March 1888 when the line extended to Charleville.

The first overnight service was the Sydney Mail (with First class sleeping carriage) introduced in January 1888 following the opening of the New South Wales line to Wallangarra. It was also the first purely passenger service with a TPO, until then all trains with TPOs had been 'mixed', i.e. carried goods wagons as well as passenger carriages. Second class sleepers were introduced in 1903.

In 1885, a TPO was added to the Central West railway line, ultimately extended to Longreach as the line progressively opened. A First class sleeping carriage was introduced on the twice weekly Central West Mail in 1892, departing Rockhampton at 22:00 and reaching Longreach at 17:00 the following day. Second class sleepers were added in 1895.

TPOs (and First class sleepers) were introduced to the Townsville-to-Winton service on the Great Northern line in 1899, extending to Mount Isa as that line was opened, and on the North Coast line as far as Maryborough in 1900. Second class sleepers were added to both lines in 1905.

Guards on rural trains had been paid an allowance to accept letters from isolated communities for posting at the nearest town, but the TPOs were staffed by Post Office personnel.

TPOs were withdrawn from the North Coast line in 1930 and the from other services in 1932 as an economy measure. Despite the loss of the TPO carriages, the services that had hauled them continued to be called Mail Trains, the last being the Dirranbandi Mail, which was withdrawn from service in 1993.

=== Wooden Sleeping Carriages ===
Following the introduction of The Inlander and subsequent air-conditioned sleeping car services in the 1950s, wooden sleepers cascaded to trains servicing places such as Kingaroy, Monto, Clermont, Springsure, Blackall, Dirranbandi, and returned to the Mount Isa line. Wooden sleeping cars were even added to overnight mixed Rockhampton to Mackay and Townsville to Cairns trains.
