= Yuleba railway station =

Railway station in Queensland, Australia

Yuleba
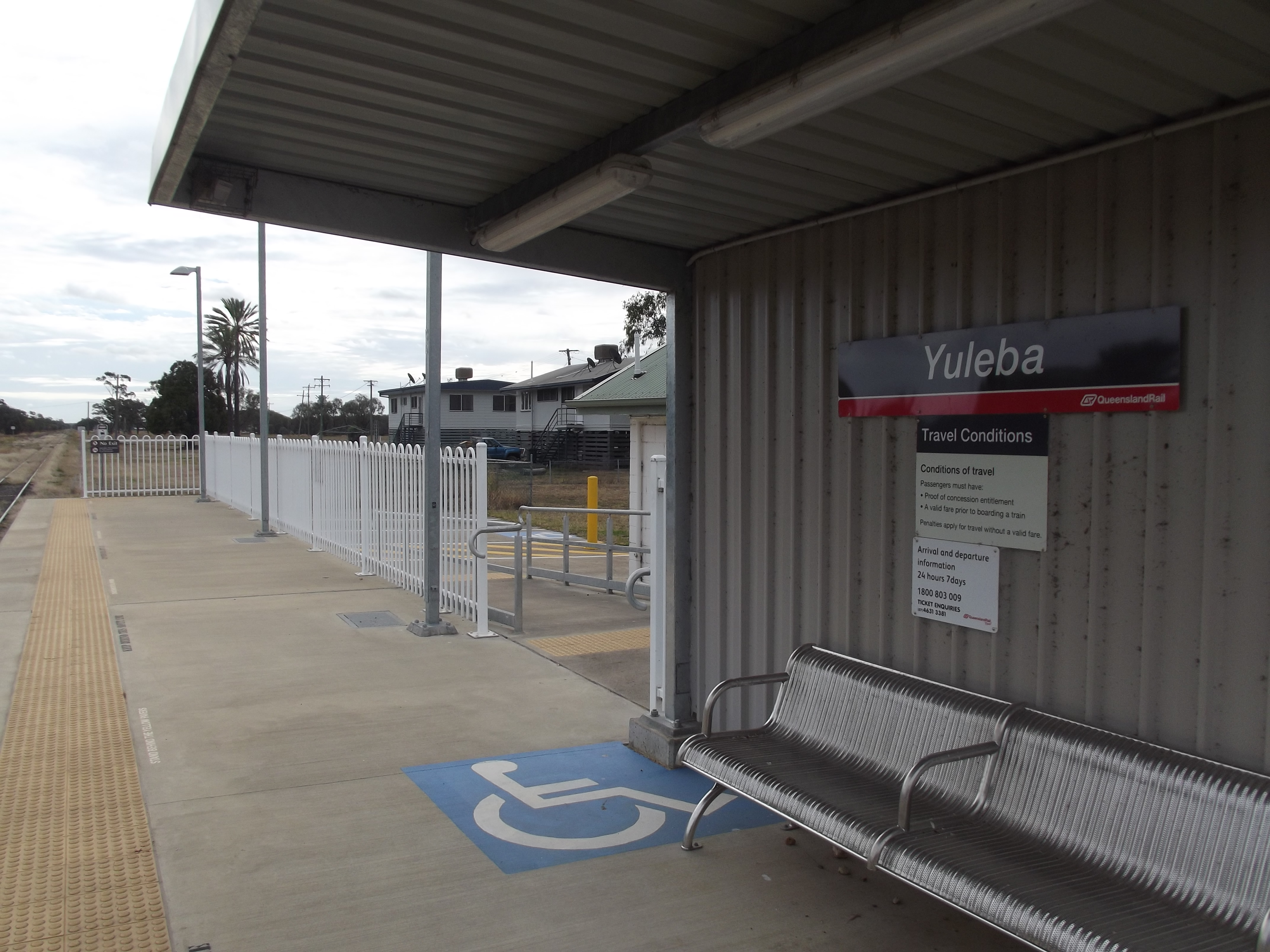
- Station in July 2013 looking towards Charleville

General information
- Location: Stephenson Street, Yuleba
- Coordinates: 26.6131°S 149.3843°E
- Owner: Queensland Rail
- Operator: Traveltrain
- Line: Western
- Platforms: 1

Construction
- Structure type: Ground
- Accessible: Yes

History
- Opened: 1879

Services
Preceding station	Queensland Rail	Following station
Miles towards Brisbane	The Westlander	Roma towards Charleville
Location

Yuleba railway station is located on the Western line in Queensland, Australia. It serves the town of Yuleba. The original station had one platform, opening in 1879.

== History ==
The original station was replaced by the present structure in 2008 and has subsequently found a new home with the DownsSteam Tourist Railway & Museum.

== Services ==
Yuleba is served by Queensland Rail Travel's twice weekly Westlander service travelling between Brisbane and Charleville.

Passengers heading for Wallumbilla Railway Station are required to alight from the Westlander at Yuleba for onward road transport to Wallumbilla.
