= Chinchilla railway station =

Railway station in Queensland, Australia

Chinchilla
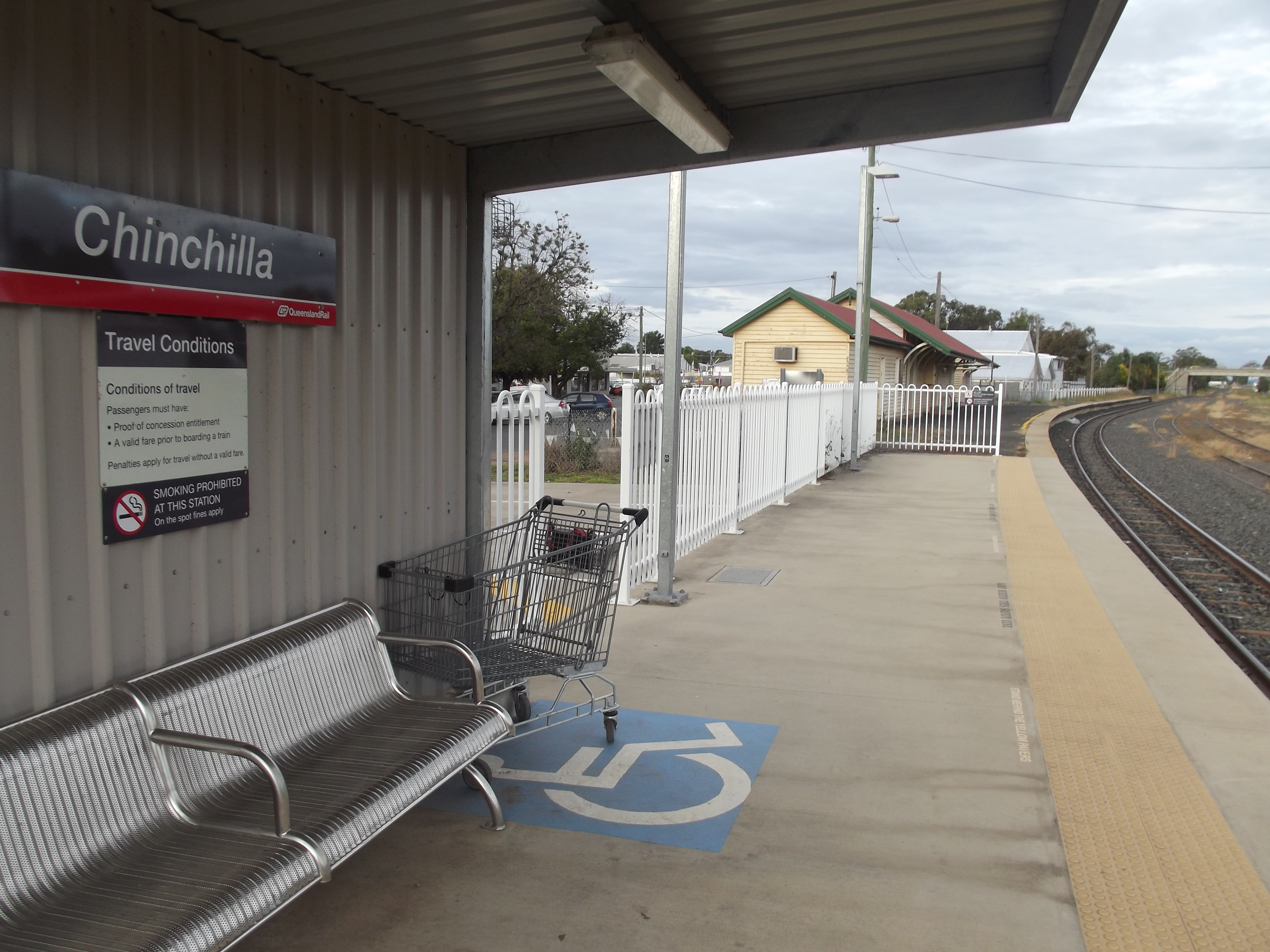
- Eastbound view looking towards Toowoomba and Brisbane in July 2013

General information
- Location: Chinchilla Street, Chinchilla
- Coordinates: 26.7371°S 150.6250°E
- Owner: Queensland Rail
- Operator: Traveltrain
- Line: Western
- Platforms: 1

Construction
- Structure type: Ground
- Accessible: Yes

History
- Opened: 1878

Services
Preceding station	Queensland Rail	Following station
Dalby towards Brisbane	The Westlander	Miles towards Charleville
Location

Chinchilla railway station is located on the Western line in Queensland, Australia. It serves the town of Chinchilla. The station has one platform, opening in 1878. Until 1994, it had a locomotive depot.

== Services ==
Chinchilla is served by Queensland Rail Travel's twice weekly Westlander service travelling between Brisbane and Charleville.

The westbound service (3S86) stops at Chinchilla at 2:35am on Wednesdays and Fridays with loading and unloading completed by on-board staff.

The eastbound service (3987) stops at Chinchilla at 3:15am on Thursdays and Saturdays with loading and unloading completed by on-board staff.

Until the end of 1993, Chinchilla was served by Rail motor services 5R16/5665 that travelled between Roma and Toowoomba in conjunction with a railbus service operated by McCafferty's between Toowoomba and Brisbane.
