= Oakey railway station =

Railway station in Queensland, Australia

Oakey
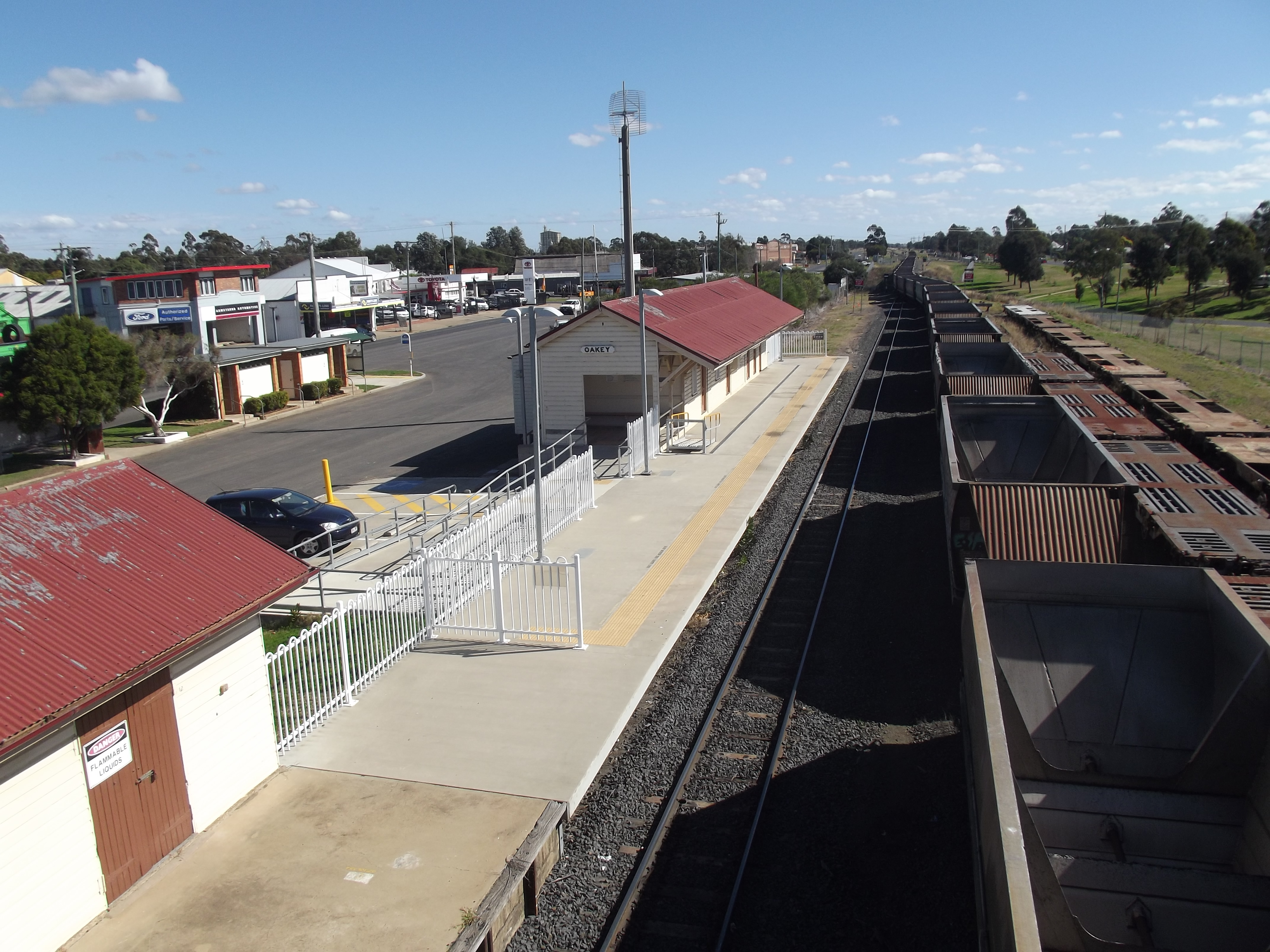
- Westbound view looking towards Dalby, Roma and Charleville in July 2013

General information
- Location: Bridge Street, Oakey
- Coordinates: 27.4312°S 151.7203°E
- Owner: Queensland Rail
- Operator: Traveltrain
- Line: Western
- Platforms: 1
- Tracks: 4

Construction
- Structure type: Ground
- Accessible: Yes

History
- Opened: 1868

Services
Preceding station	Queensland Rail	Following station
Toowoomba towards Brisbane	The Westlander	Dalby towards Charleville
Location

Oakey railway station is located on the Western line in Queensland, Australia. It serves the town of Oakey. The station has one platform with a passing loop and two sidings, opening in 1868.

In addition to it being used as an operational passenger railway station, the Oakey Railway Station is used by the Toowoomba Regional Council as the Oakey Visitor Information Centre.

== Services ==
Oakey is served by Queensland Rail Travel's twice weekly Westlander service travelling between Brisbane and Charleville.

The Westbound Service (3S86) is timetabled to stop at Oakey at 12:10am on Wednesdays and Fridays.

The Eastbound Service (3987) is timetabled to stop at Oakey at 5:55am on Thursdays and Saturdays.

Greyhound Australia also uses Oakey as a timetabled stop for the following intercity bus services:

Service	Route
Gx493	Brisbane to Mount Isa (via Toowoomba, Dalby, Chinchilla, Miles, Roma, Mitchell, Morven, Charleville, Augathella, Tambo Blackall, Barcaldine, Longreach, Winton & Cloncurry)
Gx494	Mount Isa to Brisbane (via Cloncurry, Winton, Longreach, Barcaldine, Blackall, Tambo, Augathella, Charleville, Morven, Mitchell, Roma, Miles, Chinchilla, Dalby & Toowoomba)
Gx495	Brisbane to Charleville (via Toowoomba, Dalby, Chinchilla, Miles, Roma, Mitchell & Morven)
Gx496	Charleville to Brisbane (via Morven, Mitchell, Roma, Miles, Chinchilla, Dalby and Toowoomba
