= Morven railway station =

Railway station in Queensland, Australia

Morven
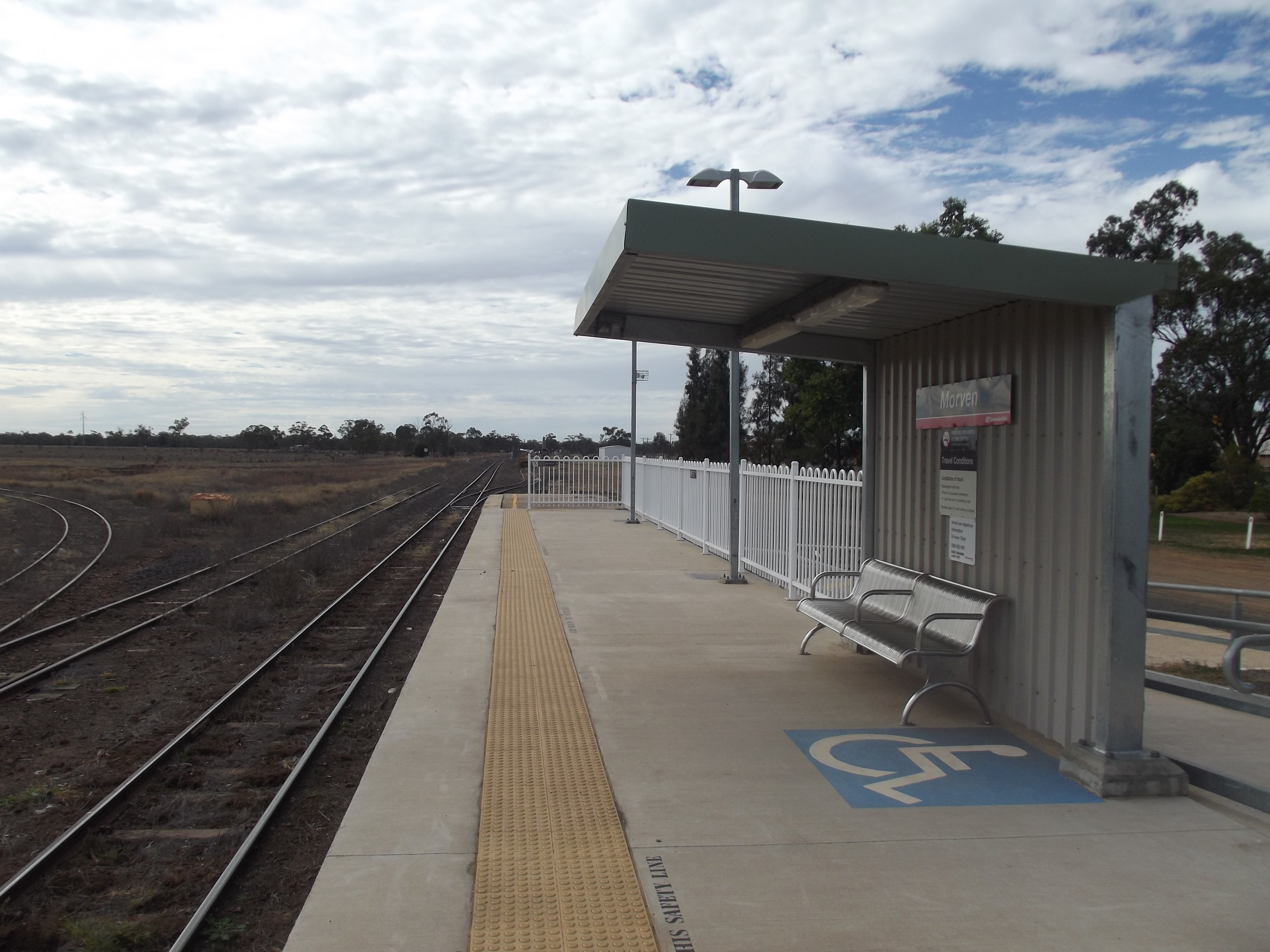
- Eastbound view in July 2013 looking towards Roma, Toowoomba and Brisbane

General information
- Location: Warrego Highway, Morven
- Coordinates: 26.4146°S 147.1133°E
- Owner: Queensland Rail
- Operator: Traveltrain
- Line: Western
- Platforms: 1

Construction
- Structure type: Ground
- Accessible: Yes

Services
Preceding station	Queensland Rail	Following station
Mitchell towards Brisbane	The Westlander	Charleville Terminus
Location

Morven railway station is located on the Western line in Queensland, Australia. It serves the town of Morven. The station has one platform. the present structure was built in 2008 with the original building being repurposed by the Murweh Shire Council and Morven Progress Association as the Morven Library in 2015.

== Services ==
Morven is served by Queensland Rail Travel's twice weekly Westlander service travelling between Brisbane and Charleville.
