= Mount Abundance =

Mount Abundance may refer to:

- Mount Abundance, Queensland, Maranoa Region, Australia
- Mount Abundance Homestead, Bungil, Maranoa Region, Queensland, Australia
- Mount Abundance (Montana), a mountain in United States
