= Mitchell railway station =

Mitchell
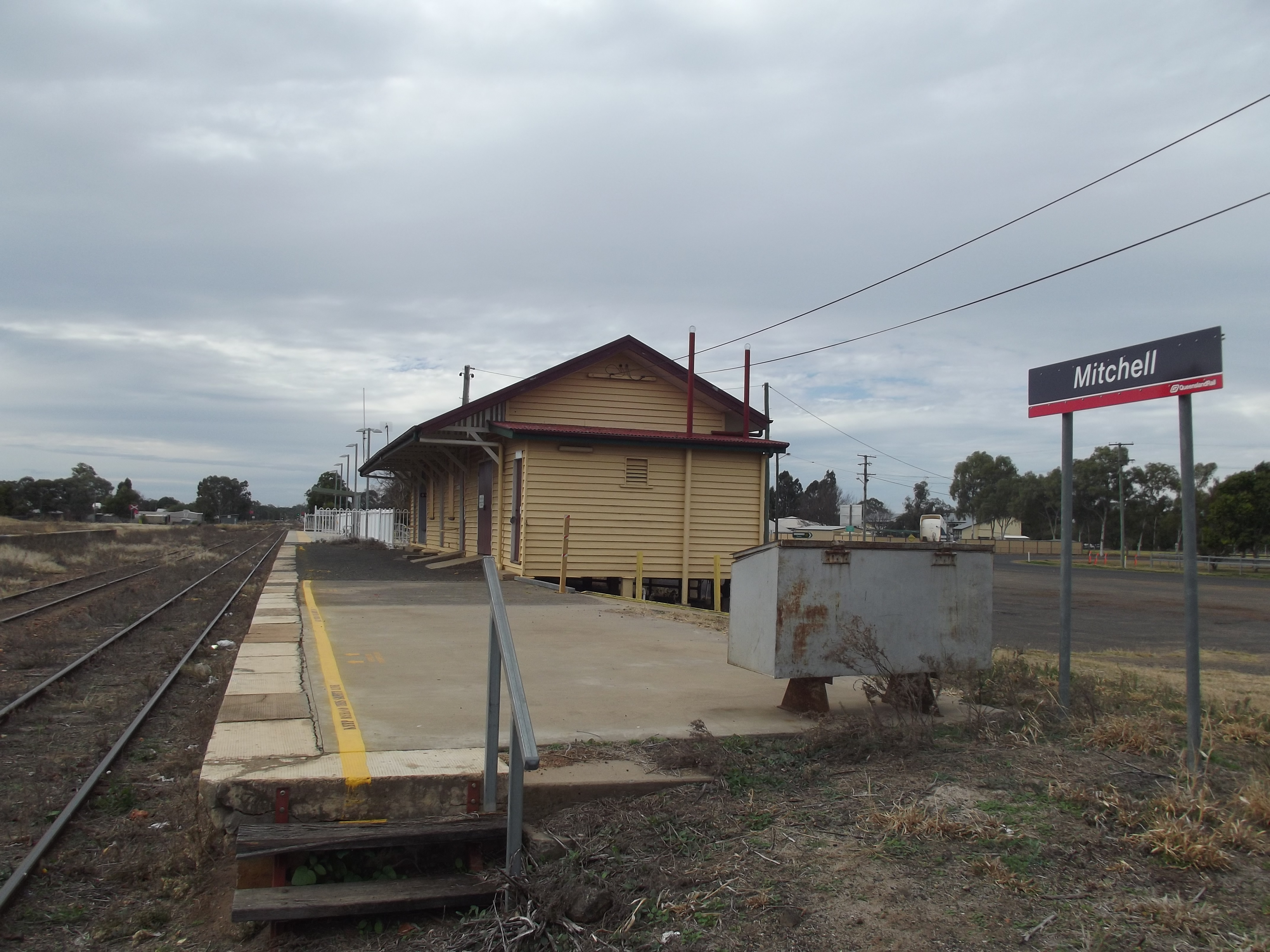
- Eastbound view in July 2013 looking towards Roma and Toowoomba

General information
- Location: Warrego Highway, Mitchell
- Coordinates: 26.4872°S 147.9687°E
- Owner: Queensland Rail
- Operator: Traveltrain
- Line: Western
- Distance: 436 kilometres from Toowoomba
- Platforms: 1

Construction
- Structure type: Ground
- Accessible: Yes

History
- Opened: 1885

Services
Preceding station	Queensland Rail	Following station
Roma towards Brisbane	The Westlander	Morven towards Charleville
Location

Mitchell railway station
- Location within Queensland
- 26.4872°S 147.9687°E
- Location: Oxford Street (passenger station), Alice Street (goods shed) and Sheffield Street (station master's, Mitchell, Maranoa Region, Queensland, Australia

History
- Design period: 1870s–1890s (late 19th century)
- Built: 1884–1933

Queensland Heritage Register
- Official name: Mitchell Railway Station
- Type: state heritage (built)
- Designated: 8 September 2005
- Reference no.: 601077
- Significant period: 1880s–1910s (historical)
- Significant components: residential accommodation – station master's house/quarters, platform, views to, shed – goods, railway station, loading bay/dock

Mitchell railway station is located on the Western line in the Maranoa Region, Queensland, Australia. It serves the town of Mitchell. The station has one platform, opening in 1885. The station has a number of heritage-listed buildings, including the passenger station in Oxford Street, the goods shed in Alice Street, and the station master's house in Sheffield Street. The buildings were added to Queensland Heritage Register on 8 September 2005.

== Services ==
Mitchell is served by Queensland Rail Travel's twice weekly Westlander service travelling between Brisbane and Charleville.

== History ==
Mitchell railway station was opened on 17 January 1885 as part of the Western railway line built to service western Queensland. Buildings of heritage significance on the site include the passenger station, goods shed and station master's house. The station complex reflects the historic role of Mitchell as a regional centre in the 19th and early 20th centuries. It provides good examples of typical railway architecture from this period in south western Queensland.

Similar to other Australian colonies, the Queensland Government fostered the development of railways as a means of developing the country and providing social benefits. It was argued that rail would reduce freight costs and save travel time for passengers. An added incentive for rail development in Queensland was the very poor state of the roads. In wet weather especially, this hampered the transport of freight. Railway development became the province of government because of the doubtful economics of building and operating private rail services for the widely distributed, sparse population of rural Queensland. In most cases the capital costs were high in relation to the potential revenue likely to be raised from passengers and freight. These economies imposed a natural limit on the expansion of railways into remote areas.

The government initially gave priority to developing a railway west of Brisbane. As well as providing graziers and farmers with a more efficient transport link to the coast, railways were seen as a key to encouraging closer settlement west of the Great Dividing Range. The first section of rail, opened on 31 July 1865, was between Ipswich and Bigge's Camp (now the heritage-listed Grandchester railway station), 34 kilometres (21 mi) west of Ipswich. By February 1868 the rail was extended to Dalby in the Darling Downs. With a railhead provided for the squatters in this region, extensions further west ceased while the railway was developed elsewhere. A line south to Warwick was opened in 1871 and in August 1872, approval was granted to extend the railway in Central Queensland and to start an Ipswich to Brisbane rail link. It was 1876 before construction of the railway westward from Dalby recommenced. The rail was opened to Roma in 1880 and to East Mitchell in 1883.

The region surrounding Mitchell was explored by Surveyor-General Sir Thomas Mitchell in the mid-1840s. The explorer spoke highly of the country's pastoral potential and within two years, squatters had occupied runs in the vicinity of Mount Abundance to the south of the present township of Mitchell. Eurella, Amby Downs, Mitchell Downs and Forest Vale, four pastoral runs in the vicinity of Mitchell, are believed have been taken up in 1861. The head station for Mitchell Downs was located on the site of the present town of Mitchell on the banks of the Maranoa River.

Mitchell Downs homestead was located on the western side of the Maranoa River, near the place where teamsters from Charleville, Bollon and St George crossed the river and was the logical site for a settlement to develop. One of the first settlers in the region recalls that after the Mitchell Downs homestead was damaged by flood waters in 1864 and had been moved to a nearby location, the remains of the original homestead were converted into the Maranoa Hotel. This was the township's first building. In 1876, Mitchell became a stage on the Cobb and Co route from Roma to Charleville. Coach routes opened from Mitchell to Bollon in 1900 and to St George in 1905.

The rail reached the eastern bank of the Maranoa River across from the township of Mitchell in 1883. The river formed a natural barrier and until a bridge was constructed, a temporary terminus at East Mitchell was established. This was opened on 8 October 1883. A public holiday was proclaimed and a free "excursion train" ran from Roma to the new terminus, but no formal ceremony was held owing to the lack of notice given of the opening. With the opening of the East Mitchell terminus, the departure point of the Roma-to-Charleville Cobb and Co route was moved to Mitchell. Coaches ran to Charleville three times weekly.

The Maranoa River bridge was completed on 10 September 1884 as part of the contract for the next rail extension. The bridge extends almost 210 metres (690 ft) and is made up of three spans on concrete piers with timber approaches. It is reputedly one of a small number of rail bridges built with continuous girders. Contracts were let in 1884 for a goods shed (still partly extant), engine and carriage sheds, booking offices, station master's house (still extant), cattle and sheep yards and three gate keeper's cottages at the site of the planned new terminus in Mitchell.

On 17 January 1885, the rail link between East Mitchell and Mitchell was opened by a ministerial party, which included Hon. William Miles (Minister for Public Works), Hon. Charles Dutton (Minister for Lands), Franics Curnow (acting Commissioner for Railways), JF Thallon (Queensland Rail Traffic Manager), P McLean (Land Commissioner in Chief) and C Adam (Railway Traffic Inspector). At this time, the main station building and platform was almost complete and the goods shed, carriage shed and engine shed were in the process of construction.

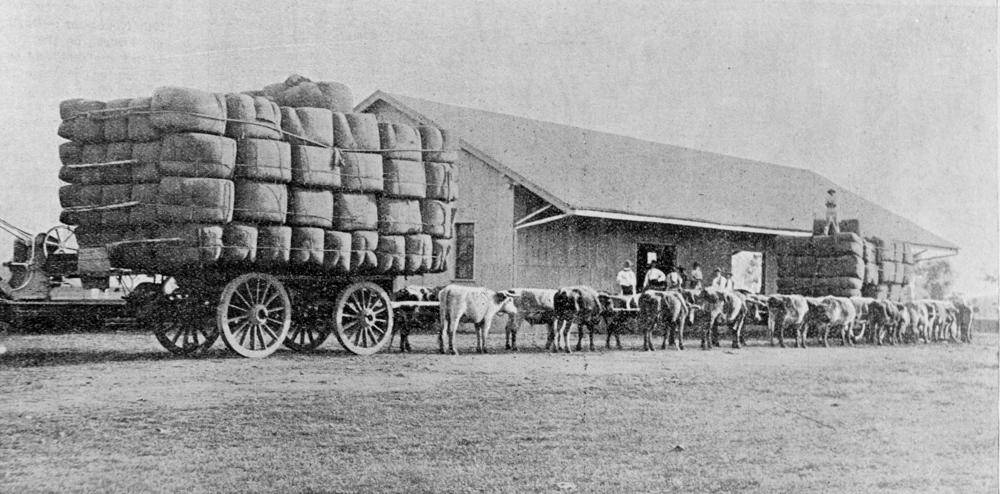
Bullock team with a wool wagon, Mitchell railway station, 1898

The opening of the rail to Mitchell brought increased commerce to the township due to its role as the western rail terminus. Outward bound wool statistics for stations during the period when the western railway was being built shows that as the rail arrived at a township, that centre enjoyed a brief period of high goods traffic until the rail moved further west. Thus, in 1882, the year before the opening of the East Mitchell railway station, Roma railway station recorded the highest quantity of outward bound wool on the Western Line at 6,687 bales. In 1884, this figure dropped to 1,308 bales with the new terminus at East Mitchell recording 9,545, the largest quantity on the western line. However, as the rail opened to places west of Mitchell, the wool traffic through the station reduced. After the opening of Morven railway station in March 1887, wool leaving Mitchell Station dwindled to 774 bales.

The extant passenger station is the third to occupy the site. The first building was destroyed by fire on the night of 13 December 1887. It was replaced by a shelter shed comprising a waiting area, office and lavatory. In about 1901, refreshment rooms (no longer extant) were erected comprising a bar, dining room and semi-detached kitchen. The second shelter shed burnt down on 29 June 1933. The present station was erected probably later that year utilising a shelter shed from Evanslea railway station and a storeroom from Silverwood railway station. The architectural style of the buildings suggests that probably they date to no earlier than 1910.

The core of the goods shed appears to date to 1884–1885. Originally 101 feet (31 m) long, the shed was quite large and this is indicative of the high goods traffic passing through the station initially. In February 1963, approval was given to reduce the length of the shed to 45 feet (14 m). Material recovered was used for repairs to the building.

A contract for the station master's house, still extant on the site, was let on 19 July 1884 to Warren Brothers, the well-known building and architectural firm based in Roma and was likely completed by the time the Mitchell Station was opened in January 1885. Warren Brothers erected many government buildings in the Roma district including the Roads and Lands Office at Roma (1878), the Court House at Surat (1878–1879) and the railway buildings at Roma (1880). The Mitchell station master's house may be a prototype for a later Queensland Rail standard design since its design is similar to Queensland Rail's architectural standard for first class station masters' houses in 1889. By as early as 1894 this standard had changed and in 1917 the Mitchell residence was recorded as a third class station master's house.

The architect responsible for the standard design for first class station master's houses was Henrik Hansen. Born in Denmark in 1843, Hansen had emigrated to Australia by 1877, when he was practicing as an architect in Maryborough. Between October 1877 and 1904, he was employed in the Chief Engineers Branch of the Queensland Railway's Southern Division. In this position, he was responsible for the design of many standard railway buildings including station masters' residences.

Minor modifications to the station master's residence in the 20th century included the removal of the original brick chimney and replacement with an iron stove recess c. 1945 and extension of the awning over the northeastern side verandah in 1963.

After Charleville Station opened in 1888, the carriage and engine sheds at Mitchell railway station were moved to Charleville. Of these two buildings, the engine shed remained intact until 2003 when it was blown down in a severe windstorm.

Since the station was first opened in 1885, accommodation for train and maintenance crews has been erected on the site. In the 1950s, train crews were quartered at Mitchell to relieve crews travelling from Roma and Charleville. A modified goods shed and two fettlers' cottages were moved to the site to accommodate crews. By 1961 there were 12 residential buildings on the site providing accommodation for maintenance and operations staff. Currently, there are only three residential buildings, comprising the station master's house and two more recent houses.

== Description ==
Mitchell railway station is located on Oxford Street, on the western edge of Mitchell township. The buildings and structures of cultural heritage significance include the passenger station (c. 1910 moved to the station c. 1933) the goods shed (1884–1885 with substantial later modifications) and the station master's house (1884). The passenger station is located on the southern side of the railway tracks and faces Oxford Street. The goods shed is immediately opposite the passenger station on the northern side of the tracks. Over 100 metres (330 ft) away from these structures towards the north, is the station master's house located on a separate allotment accessed from Ann Road.

=== Passenger Station ===
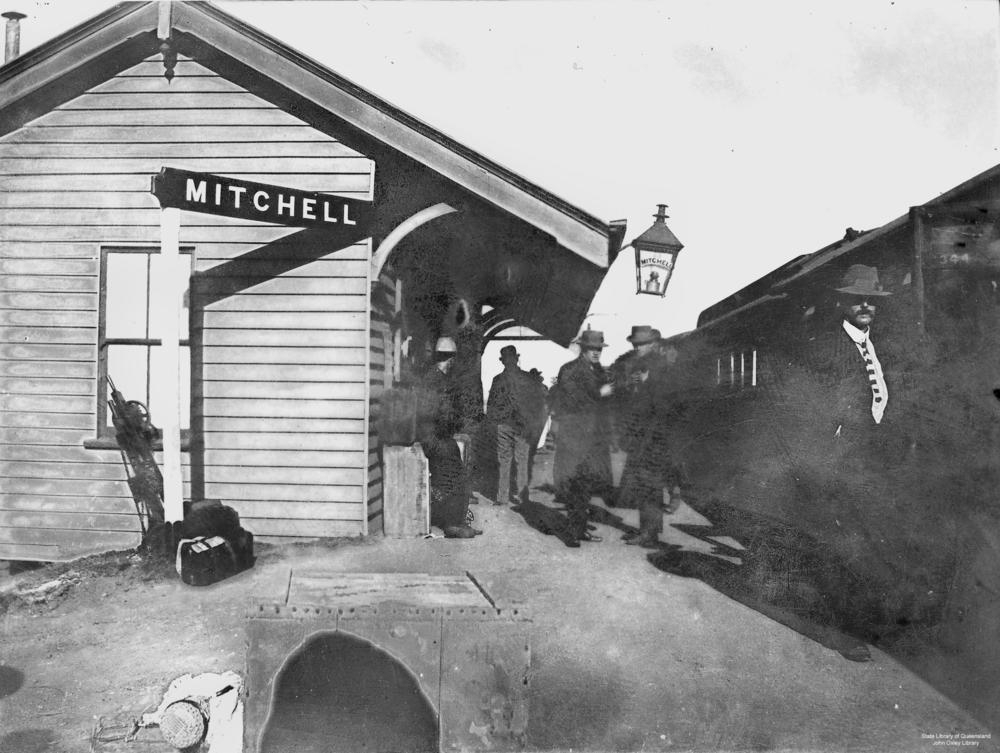
Mitchell railway station

The passenger station is a narrow building, timber-framed and clad in weatherboards, set on concrete stumps. It has a gabled roof of corrugated iron. A small extension to the south west of the building has a skillion roof.

The south eastern elevation of the building faces the road. A set of double, framed and boarded doors provide the only access through this elevation. These open out onto a small loading platform and give access into the store room at the south western end of the building. Four timber framed, vertical sliding windows are distributed along the elevation to the east of the doors. A fifth window opening into the lavatory at the north eastern end is louvred.

The ends of the building are each provided with a single window. A vertical sliding window is located roughly in the centre of the north eastern end and a small louvered window is fitted in the middle of the other end near the top.

The platform extends along the length of the north western elevation. A series of doors and openings give access onto the platform. The waiting room is enclosed on three sides only. The fourth side is open to the platform and this forms the largest opening on the platform elevation. Single doors provide access to the records room and the male lavatory, two single doors open into the station office and a double door opens into the store. With the exception of the door into the male lavatory, the single doors are paneled, with the top panels of the doors into the office glassed. The double doors into the store are framed and boarded. Two vertical sliding windows open into the office. Access into the women's lavatory is via a single door from the waiting shed.

The roof of the building extends over the platform. A series of horizontal timber members extend from the wall out to the rafters over the platform. The space between the members and the rafters is in-filled with vertical slats. Short straight timber brackets extend from the midpoint of the horizontal member down to the wall at an angle of approximately 45°.

With the exception of the store room and men's lavatory, the internal rooms of the station are all lined. The women's lavatory, store room and waiting shed at the north eastern end are lined with vertical boards and the office with fibro or plaster board. Timber benches are fixed to two of the walls in the waiting shed.

=== Goods shed ===
The goods shed is a large timber-framed structure, clad in corrugated iron. It has a gabled roof with wide eaves. On the northwestern elevation, two large ledge and brace sliding doors provide road transport access to an internal loading bay. A raised timber platform fills most of the interior of the shed. The concrete floored loading bay is the only section of the floor which is at ground level. Outside the shed on the southeastern side, a raised timber platform runs along the rail tracks almost the full length of the elevation. Two large ledge and brace timber sliding doors open onto this platform.

=== Station Master's House ===
The station master's house is a timber-framed building clad with weatherboards, sitting on short concrete stumps. It comprises an L-shaped, five-roomed core with a central hallway; a separately roofed, semi-detached kitchen; and a later skillion-roofed laundry along the southwest side, between the kitchen and the main house, resting on a concrete slab. All the roofs are clad with corrugated galvanised iron.

The core of the house has a gabled roof over the front four rooms with a hipped roof extending at the back of the house along the northeast side, to accommodate a fifth room and a passage leading to the kitchen. There are separately roofed verandahs to the front and sides of the core. These have a two-rail balustrade and simple timber brackets to the verandah posts. The verandah along the southwest side has been enclosed at a later date to accommodate a bathroom and toilet.

The northwestern elevation is the front of the house. Access is gained to the verandah via a short, centrally positioned staircase opposite a four-paneled front door. On either side of the front door is a double-hung sash window with four lights.

The northeastern verandah roof is extended by a skillion, approximately one metre wide, running the full length of the elevation. The extended roof is supported by a series of horizontal members extending from the verandah posts out to the rafters. Short straight timber brackets extend from the midpoint of each horizontal member down to the posts at an angle of approximately 45°. The space between the members and the rafters are in-filled with vertical slats. Two double-hung sash windows and a set of French doors (which open into the rear bedroom) are spaced evenly along the elevation.

The kitchen at the rear of the house has a projecting stove recess, clad with curved corrugated iron, in the southwest elevation. Rear access to the house is gained through a door in the centre of the southeast elevation of the kitchen building. The approach to the door is via a short staircase running parallel to the wall and ending on a small landing covered by a skillion roof. There is a double-hung sash window with four lights to the right of the door and a single set of later louvres to the left of the door. A corrugated iron tank on a tank-stand is located adjacent to the northeastern end of the kitchen.

The interior linings and fittings of the house appear to be of fairly recent origin. In the laundry, the northeastern interior wall (formerly an external wall of the house) is clad in weatherboards. The kitchen is fitted with built-in cupboards, sink and stove of fairly recent origin, but there is also an early wood stove in the iron stove recess.

The house is located on a separate allotment to the rest of the station buildings. A weld-mesh fence encloses the block. The allotment is almost bare of vegetation except for an assortment of small shrubs and trees growing mostly at the rear of the block. A steel carport and garden shed of recent origin are located to the south west of the house. These are not considered to be of cultural heritage significance.

== Heritage listing ==
Mitchell railway station was listed on the Queensland Heritage Register on 8 September 2005 having satisfied the following criteria.

The place is important in demonstrating the evolution or pattern of Queensland's history.

The Mitchell railway station, opened in 1885, is important in demonstrating the evolution of Queensland's history, providing physical evidence of Mitchell's role as a regional centre in the late 19th century. The station master's house and the core of the goods shed date to this period. The establishment of a railway station at Mitchell was consistent with the town's historic role as a node on southwestern Queensland's transport network, being located at the junction of roads to Roma, Charleville, Bollon and St George. As the western rail terminus for about two years after its opening, Mitchell was one of the busiest stations on the Western Line.

The place demonstrates rare, uncommon or endangered aspects of Queensland's cultural heritage.

The station master's house, constructed in 1884, is a substantially intact and now rare early example of a mid-1880s station master's residence. The earliest identified Queensland Rail standard drawing of this type of station master's residence dates to 1889, five years after the construction of the Mitchell house. The design was superseded by the beginning of the 20th century.

The place is important in demonstrating the principal characteristics of a particular class of cultural places.

The station complex is important in demonstrating the principal characteristics of railway stations during the late 19th and early 20th centuries, when the importance of the rail link to the west was fundamental to the region's economic development. The station retains a number of principal elements from this period including the station master's house (1884), the goods shed (1884–1885) and the passenger station (c. 1910 moved to the station c. 1933). The station master's house is important in illustrating the varied work of Queensland Railway's architectural office during the tenure of Henrik Hansen, the Danish born architect who was responsible for the design of many standard Queensland Rail buildings of the nineteenth century. The passenger station is a composite of two buildings transported from Evanslea and Silverwood Stations in c. 1933 to replace the previous building which had burnt down. This is a good example of a Queensland Rail practice, common until the 1960s, of recycling railway buildings and structures.

The place is important because of its aesthetic significance.

The station is a small, railway landmark on the route of the "Westlander". Including station master's house, makes a strong aesthetic contribution to the townscape of Mitchell.
