= Bungil, Queensland =

Bungil
- Suburb
- Interactive map of Bungil
- Coordinates: 26.6594°S 148.7841°E
- Country: Australia
- State: Queensland
- LGA: Maranoa Region
- Location: 6.5 km (4.0 mi) S of Roma; 357 km (222 mi) WNW of Toowoomba; 485 km (301 mi) WNW of Brisbane

Government
  - State electorate: Warrego
  - Federal division: Maranoa

Area
  - Total: 165.5 km^{2} (63.9 sq mi)

Population
  - Total: 69 (2021 census)
  - Density: 0.4169/km^{2} (1.080/sq mi)
- Time zone: UTC+10:00 (AEST)
- Postcode: 4455
Suburbs around Bungil
Bungeworgorai	Dargal Road	Roma
Mount Abundance	Bungil	Tingun
Mount Abundance	Tingun	Tingun

Bungil is a locality in the Maranoa Region, Queensland, Australia. In the 2021 census, Bungil had a population of 69 people.

== Geography ==
The western boundary of the locality roughly follows Bungil Creek, while the Warrego Highway and Western railway line form part of the northern boundary. Bungeworgorai Creek flows through the locality from the northwest (Bungeworgorai) to the south-east becoming a tributary of Bungil Creek in neighbouring Tingun.

The land is predominantly developed for cattle grazing.

== History ==
The locality takes its name from the parish, which is believed to be an Aboriginal word "boo-nga-gill" where "boo" means grass, "nga" means with and "gill" means water.

Six Mile Camping Reserve Provisional School opened on 26 June 1900. On 1 January 1909, it became Six Mile Camping Reserve State School. It closed on 15 June 1926. It was on the north-eastern corner of 538 Six Mile Road (26.63471°S 148.82546°E).

== Demographics ==
In the 2016 census, Bungil had a population of 27 people.

In the 2021 census, Bungil had a population of 69 people.

== Heritage listings ==
Bungil has a number of heritage-listed sites, including:

- Warrego Highway: Mount Abundance Homestead

== Education ==
There are no schools in the locality. The nearest government primary and secondary school is Roma State College in neighbouring Roma to the north-east.
