= Bungeworgorai =

- Suburb
- Interactive map of Bungeworgorai
- Coordinates: 26.4780°S 148.6113°E
- Country: Australia
- State: Queensland
- LGA: Maranoa Region
- Location: 27.2 km (16.9 mi) NW of Roma; 378 km (235 mi) WNW of Toowoomba; 507 km (315 mi) WNW of Brisbane

Government
  - State electorate: Warrego
  - Federal division: Maranoa

Area
  - Total: 244.3 km^{2} (94.3 sq mi)

Population
  - Total: 68 (2021 census)
  - Density: 0.2783/km^{2} (0.721/sq mi)
- Time zone: UTC+10:00 (AEST)
- Postcode: 4455
Suburbs around Bungeworgorai
Orallo	Euthulla	Orallo
Mount Bindango	Bungeworgorai	Euthulla
Mount Bindango	Mount Bindango	Bungil; Dargal Road; Mount Abundance; Hodgson

Bungeworgorai is a rural locality in the Maranoa Region, Queensland, Australia. In the 2021 census, Bungeworgorai had a population of 68 people.

== Geography ==
The Western railway line and Warrego Highway pass along the southern boundary of the locality. Bungeworgorai railway station is located at 26°34′53″S 148°43′0″E.

Kingull is a neighbourhood in the locality (26.4166°S 148.65°E).

Nareeten is a neighbourhood in the locality (26.3666°S 148.65°E).

== History ==
The name Nareeten comes from a former railway station name, assigned by the Queensland Railways Department on 11 November 1915, and is an Aboriginal word meaning wild flower. The name was proposed by the Orallo Farmers and Settlers Association.

Bungeworgorai State School opened circa 1885 and closed circa 1897.

== Demographics ==
In the 2016 census, Bungeworgorai had a population of 78 people.

In the 2021 census, Bungeworgorai had a population of 68 people.

== Education ==
There are no schools in the locality. The nearest primary and secondary school is Roma State College in Roma to the south-east.
