= Dalby railway station =

Railway station in Queensland, Australia

Dalby
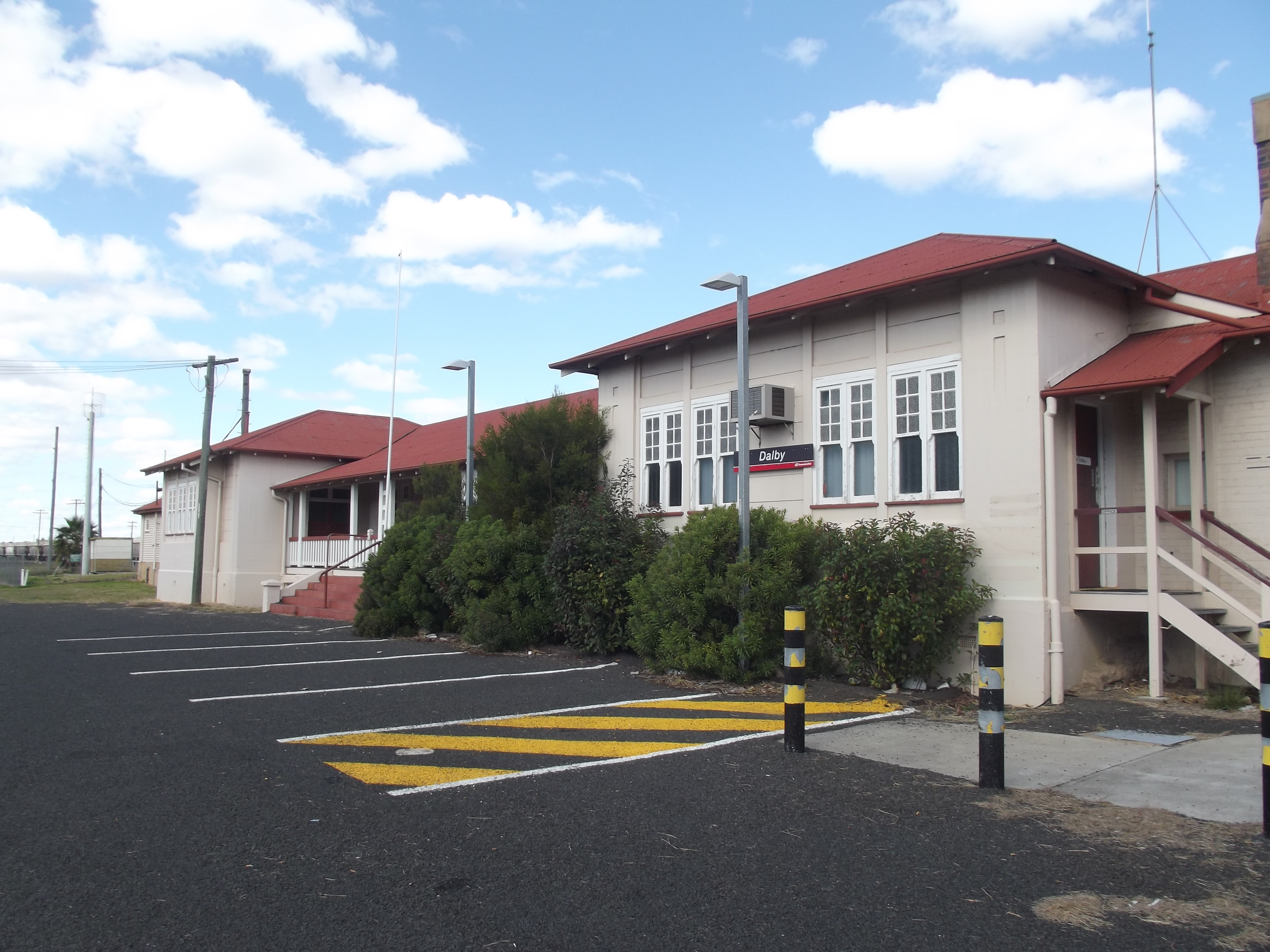
- Station front in July 2013 looking towards Toowoomba and Brisbane

General information
- Location: 2 Hunter Street, Dalby
- Coordinates: 27.1798°S 151.2715°E
- Owner: Queensland Rail
- Operator: Traveltrain
- Line: Western
- Platforms: 1 (plus one disused)
- Tracks: 2

Construction
- Structure type: Single Story Precast concrete
- Parking: 5 inc 1 disabled
- Accessible: Yes

Other information
- Status: Building occupied by Western Downs Outreach Project Inc. Passenger services stop Wed/Fri 1.17am westbound and Thurs/Sat 4:47am eastbound. Platform access is via the ramp on the west side of the station building.

History
- Opened: 20 April 1868
- Rebuilt: 1914 for the provision of a second platform to service branch lines. Was again rebuilt after a fire in 1930

Services
Preceding station	Queensland Rail	Following station
Oakey towards Brisbane	The Westlander	Chinchilla towards Charleville
Location

Dalby railway station is located on the Western line in Queensland, Australia, serving the town of Dalby. The station has one platform with a passing loop and opened on 16 April 1868. The Dalby station has had 3 station building over its lifetime, the first built at the western end of the platform. This was removed and a new building built at the eastern end of the platform so that an additional platform could be constructed to service the newly created branch lines to Tara (which would eventually stretch to Meandarra and Glenmorgan), Jandowae and Bell (the Bell branch railway was mothballed in 1994, the Jandowae line was closed in 2013 and the Glenmorgan Line was closed to rail traffic past Meandarra in 2013 and remains "booked out of use" by Aurizon and Watco Australia past Meandarra as of 2022). The wooden station building built in 1913 was burned down in 1930, to be replaced later in that year by a pre-cast concrete building using the same foundations and floor plan of the original building.

As of 1 December 2015, the building is occupied by the community group "Western Downs Outreach Project". The station building is now used as a community lounge that is open six days a week. A soup kitchen operates on Monday, Thursday & Saturday nights. Markets are held at front and within the station building on the first Sunday of each month. All proceeds are used to restore the building and continue the soup kitchen.

== Services ==
Dalby is served by Queensland Rail Travel's twice weekly Westlander service travelling between Brisbane and Charleville.

The westbound service (3S86) bound for Charleville stops at Dalby at 1:17am on Wednesdays and Fridays with loading and unloading completed by on-board staff.

The eastbound service (3987) coming from Charleville stops at Dalby at 4:47am on Thursdays and Saturdays with loading and unloading completed by on-board staff.

The Ticket office is operated by Western Downs Outreach Project as an agent for Queensland Rail Travel.Open Mon - Fri 10am - 4pm. It also serves as an agent for Greyhound Australia, Murray's Coaches and Premier Motor Services.
