= Wallumbilla railway station =

Former railway station in Queensland, Australia

Wallumbilla
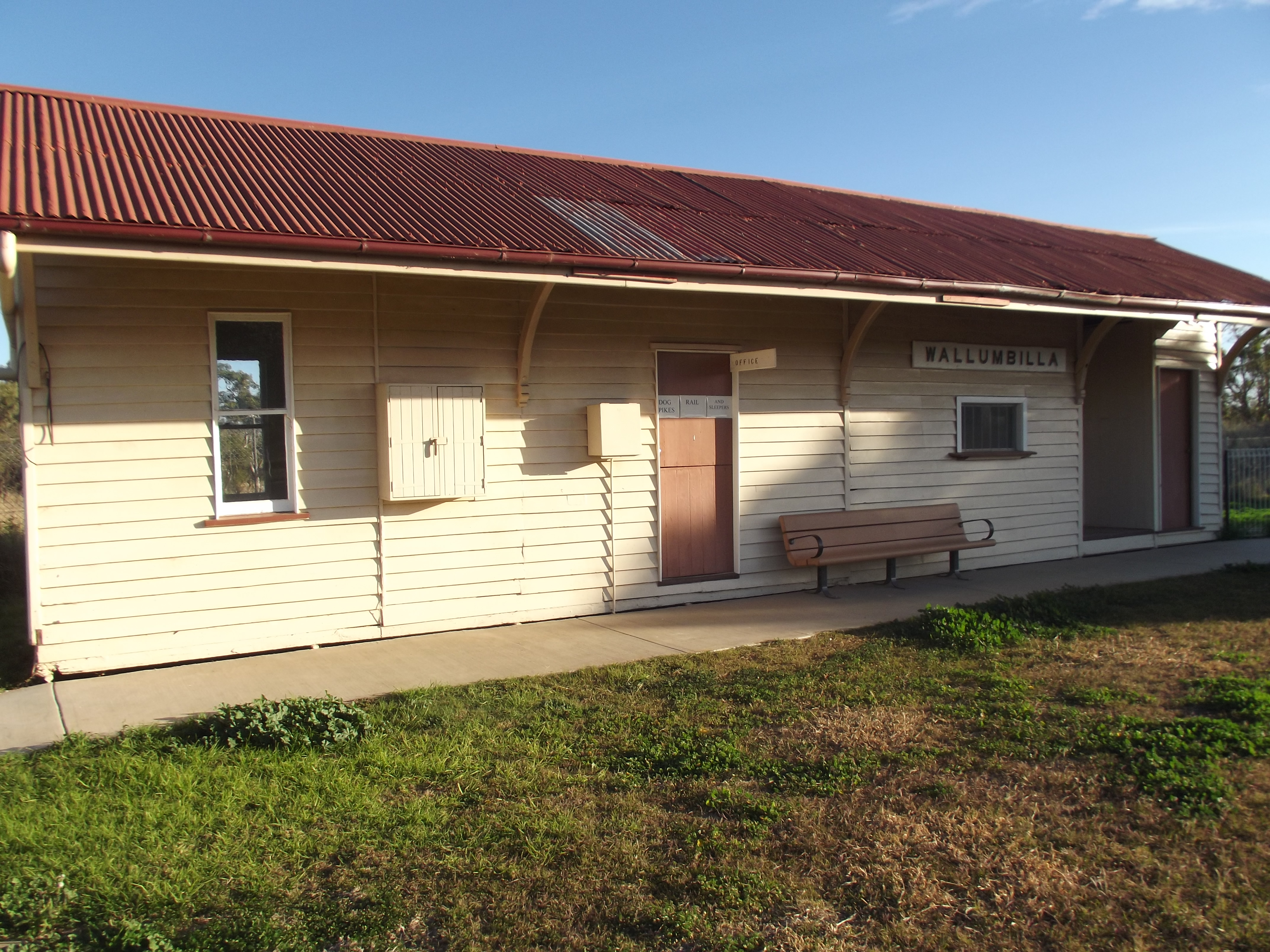
- Station front in July 2013

General information
- Location: Warrego Highway, Wallumbilla
- Coordinates: 26.6131°S 149.3843°E
- Owner: Queensland Rail
- Operator: Traveltrain
- Line: Western
- Platforms: 1

Construction
- Structure type: Ground
- Accessible: Yes

Other information
- Status: Disused

History
- Opened: 1879
Location

Wallumbilla railway station is a disused station located on the Western line in Queensland, Australia. It served the town of Wallumbilla and had one platform.

== History ==
The station opened in 1879.

On 1 December 1956, The Westlander collided head-on with the Western Mail which was stationary at Wallumbilla station. The crash killed 5 people and injured 11 or 13 people. There is a memorial at the railway station commemorating the crash.

== Services ==
Wallumbilla was served by Queensland Rail Travel's twice weekly Westlander service travelling between Brisbane and Charleville until 2002. Passengers are now required to alight at the preceding station (Yuleba) for road transport.
