= Dargal Road, Queensland =

Dargal Road
- Suburb
- Interactive map of Dargal Road
- Coordinates: 26.5583°S 148.7263°E
- Country: Australia
- State: Queensland
- LGA: Maranoa Region
- Location: 8.1 km (5.0 mi) WNW of Roma, Queensland; 359 km (223 mi) WNW of Toowoomba; 543 km (337 mi) WNW of Brisbane

Government
  - State electorate: Warrego
  - Federal division: Maranoa

Area
  - Total: 28.0 km^{2} (10.8 sq mi)

Population
  - Total: 198 (2021 census)
  - Density: 7.071/km^{2} (18.31/sq mi)
- Postcode: 4455
Suburbs around Dargal Road
Bungeworgorai	Euthulla	Euthulla
Bungeworgorai	Dargal Road	Roma
Bungeworgorai	Bungeworgorai	Bungil

Dargal Road is a rural locality in the Maranoa Region, Queensland, Australia. In the 2021 census, Dargal Road had a population of 198 people.

== Geography ==
The locality is bounded to the south by the Warrego Highway and Western railway line, by Bungeworgorai Creek to the west, and by Richardson Lane to the east.

The locality presumably takes its name from the road of the same name which traverses the locality from the north-east (Roma) to the north-west (Bungeworgorai).

The land use is mostly grazing on native vegetation with some crop growing and some rural residential housing.

== History ==
Wangary Provisional School opened circa 1898 operating as a half-time provisional school in conjunction with Mount Beagle Provisional School (meaning the two schools shared a single teacher). In 1902, it became a full-time provisional school. On 1 January 1909, it became Wangary State School. In 1910, tenders were called for a new school building. It closed in 1930. The school was at 709 Bungeworgorai Lane (26.52870°S 148.71713°E).

The locality was served by the Bungeworgorai railway station (26.5810°S 148.7169°E) on the Western railway line, now abandoned.

The former Injune railway line passed through the locality which was served by the Ona Ona railway station in the north-eastern corner of the locality (26.5386°S 148.7525°E). It was named by the Queensland Railways Department on 29 April 1915, using an Aboriginal word meaning boxtree flat.

== Demographics ==
In the 2016 census, Dargal Road had a population of 152 people.

In the 2021 census, Dargal Road had a population of 198 people.

== Education ==
There are no schools in the locality. The nearest primary and secondary school is Roma State College in Roma to the east.
