= Hodgson, Queensland =

Hodgson
- Town
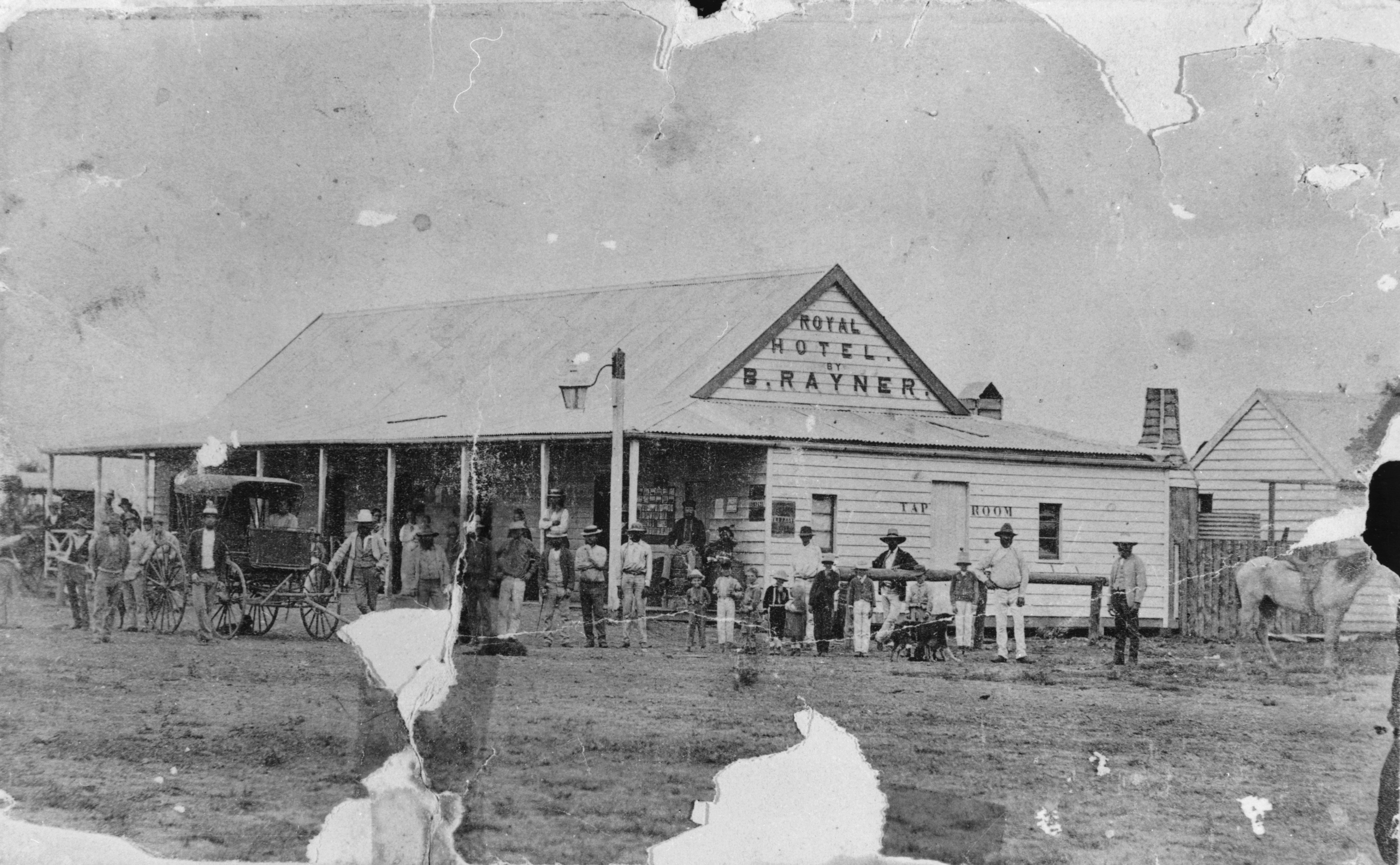
- Royal Hotel in Hodgson, circa 1886

- Interactive map of Hodgson
- Coordinates: 26.5605°S 148.6247°E
- Country: Australia
- State: Queensland
- LGA: Maranoa Region
- Location: 19.8 km (12.3 mi) W of Roma

Government
  - State electorate: Warrego
  - Federal division: Maranoa

Area
  - Total: 23.4 km^{2} (9.0 sq mi)

Population
  - Total: 95 (2021 census)
  - Density: 4.060/km^{2} (10.51/sq mi)
- Time zone: UTC+10:00 (AEST)
- Postcode: 4455
Localities around Hodgson
Bungeworgorai	Bungeworgorai	Bungeworgorai
Mount Bindango	Hodgson	Bungeworgorai
Mount Abundance	Mount Abundance	Mount Abundance

Hodgson is a rural town and locality in the Maranoa Region, Queensland, Australia. In the 2021 census, the locality of Hodgson had a population of 95 people.

== Geography ==
The Warrego Highway and the Western Railway Line both run along the southern boundary of the locality. The locality is served by Hodgson railway station (26.5767°S 148.6223°E).

The town is situated in roughly the centre of the locality. North Hodgson is a neighbourhood north of the town (26.55°S 148.6166°E).

The land use is mostly for livestock grazing on native vegetation with some crop growing.

== History ==
The town was named after landowner and politician Arthur Hodgson.

Hodgson Provisional School opened on 1 February 1876. On 1 September 1884, it became Hodgson State School. It closed in 1964.

Hodgson Soldier's Memorial Hall was officially opened on Saturday 21 May 1949. It was erected in memory of Hodgson residents who had died in military service during World War I and World War II.

Hodgson Community Church opened on Sunday 31 July 1949. It was in Hodgson Lane North. Circa 1990, the church was relocated to be used as a hall at the rear of the Salvation Army church in Roma.

== Demographics ==
In the 2016 census, the locality of Hodgson had a population of 61 people.

In the 2021 census, the locality of Hodgson had a population of 95 people.
