= Mount Abundance, Queensland =

Mount Abundance
- Suburb
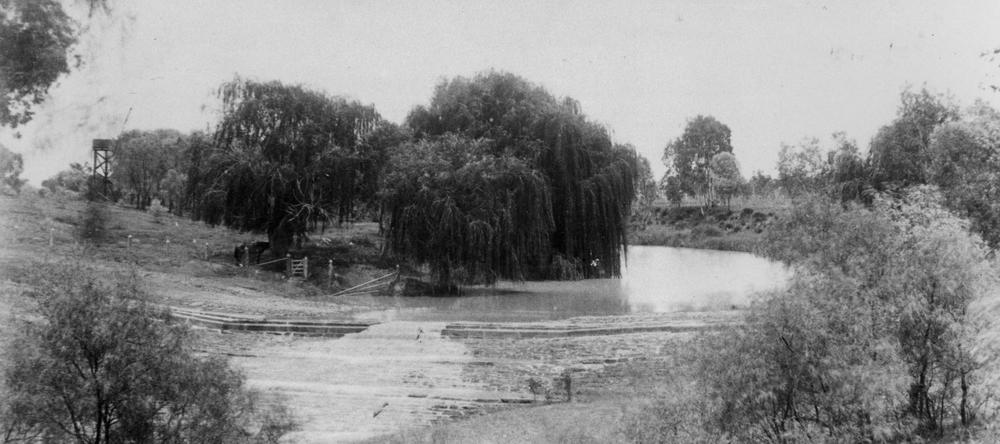
- Mount Abundance, circa 1896

- Interactive map of Mount Abundance
- Coordinates: 26.7822°S 148.5091°E
- Country: Australia
- State: Queensland
- LGA: Maranoa Region
- Location: 27.5 km (17.1 mi) SW of Roma; 367 km (228 mi) WNW of Toowoomba; 565 km (351 mi) WNW of Brisbane

Government
  - State electorate: Warrego
  - Federal division: Maranoa

Area
  - Total: 1,656.8 km^{2} (639.7 sq mi)

Population
  - Total: 178 (2021 census)
  - Density: 0.10744/km^{2} (0.2783/sq mi)
- Time zone: UTC+10:00 (AEST)
- Postcode: 4455
Suburbs around Mount Abundance
Muckadilla	Mount Bindango; Hodgson	Bungeworgorai; Bungil
Eurella	Mount Abundance	Tingun
Dunkeld	Ballaroo	Tingun

Mount Abundance is a locality in the Maranoa Region, Queensland, Australia. In the 2021 census, Mount Abundance had a population of 178 people.

== Geography ==
The Warrego Highway enters the locality from the north-east (Bungeworgorai), and forms the northern boundary of the locality, exiting to the north-west (Muckadilla). The Western railway line runs immediately parallel and north of the highway, with the locality served by (from west to east):

- Brinsop railway station, now abandoned (26.5888°S 148.4722°E)
- Bindango railway station, now abandoned (26.5824°S 148.5442°E)
- Hodgson railway station (26.5767°S 148.6223°E)

The locality has the following mountains (from north to south):

- Mount Abundance (26.6635°S 148.4228°E) 466 metres (1,529 ft)
- One Tree Hill (26.7584°S 148.4914°E) 438 metres (1,437 ft)
- Mount Redcap (26.8012°S 148.3500°E) 413 metres (1,355 ft)
- Mount Inviting (26.8146°S 148.3830°E) 366 metres (1,201 ft)

The land use is a mixture of crop growing and grazing on native vegetation.

== History ==
The name comes from the name of the mountain, which in turned was named by Surveyor-General Thomas Mitchell on 7 May 1846 because of the "abundance of pasture" in the area.

The Mount Abundance run was taken up in 1847 by Allan MacPherson, a young squatter from New South Wales. MacPherson had come to Queensland seeking new pastures, and had followed the route of Sir Thomas Mitchell into the Mount Abundance area. Mitchell had named Mount Abundance in 1846 during his expedition to find a route from New South Wales to the Gulf of Carpentaria. Following constant conflicts with local Indigenous people, MacPherson decided Mount Abundance was a dangerous place and in late 1849, MacPherson withdrew his sheep from Mount Abundance, leaving it as a cattle station, and returned to England. In 1856 MacPherson briefly visited Australia at which time he disposed of his pastoral interests, including the sale of Mount Abundance to Stephen Spencer.

Prussian explorer, Ludwig Leichhardt was last seen on the 3 April 1848 at Cogoon Run, an outlying part of Mount Abundance on his ill-fated 1848 expedition from the Condamine River to the Swan River before his party disappeared without a trace.

Spencer and his family are considered to have been the first European family to settle in the area. It is recorded that when they arrived at the station, it was found to be run down, and the buildings damaged by fire. Rough huts provided temporary quarters until Spencer built a new homestead, and Mount Abundance station is described as the focal point for the district during this period. Spencer ran a supply store, and the station formed a depot for European explorers heading into the western districts. A post office was opened at the homestead in September 1861. Augustus Charles Gregory arrived at Mount Abundance in 1862, and selected a locality for the township which become known as Roma, proclaimed in September that year. The post office at Mount Abundance homestead closed at the end of 1863 when the Roma post office opened.

On 17 May 1927, 57 allotments of Mount Abundance land, south-west of Roma, were advertised for lease by the Lands Department. Each lease carried a condition that a certain area had to be cultivated with wheat within a specified period. A map advertised the offer which ran from the 17 to 31 May 1927. Mount Abundance Homestead and its remaining farmland still exists and is listed on the Queensland Heritage Register, but what remains is now within the present-day neighbouring locality of Bungil.

Mount Abundance State School opened on 20 August 1951. It closed on 13 December 1985.

== Demographics ==
In the 2016 census, Mount Abundance had a population of 194 people.

In the 2021 census, Mount Abundance had a population of 178 people.

== Education ==
There are no schools in Mount Abundance. The nearest government primary schools are Roma State College in Roma to the north-east and Dunkeld State School in neighbouring Dunkeld to the south-west. The nearest government secondary school is Roma State College in Roma, but it might be too distant for a daily commute from the some parts of Mount Abundance, so distance education and boarding school are other options.
