= Mount Abundance Homestead =

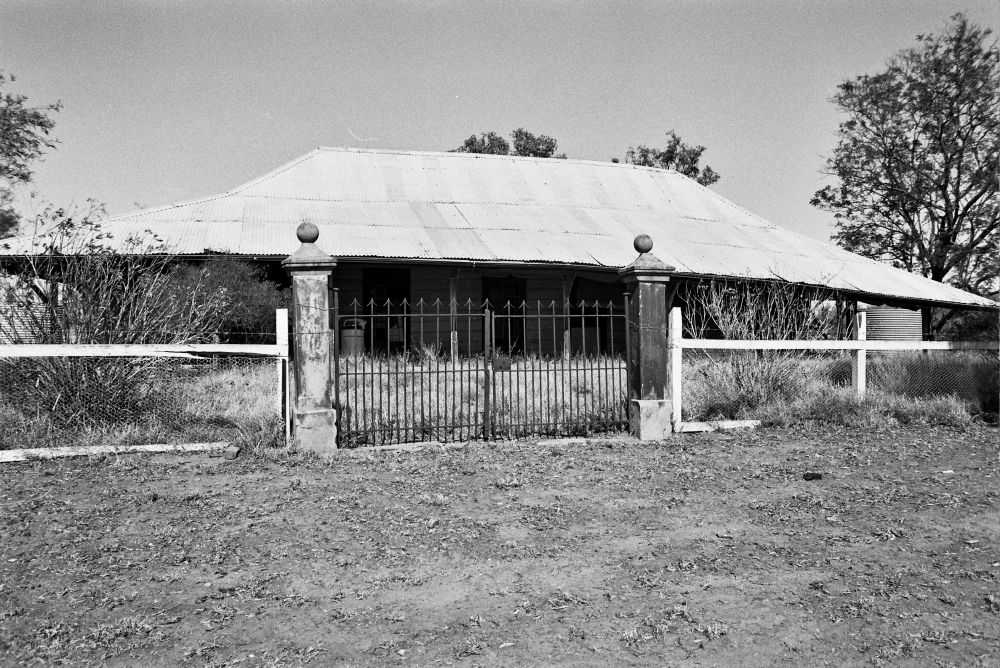
- Mount Abundance Homestead today

- Location within Queensland Location within Australia
- 26.5991°S 148.7034°E
- Location: Warrego Highway, Bungil, Maranoa Region, Queensland, Australia

History
- Design period: 1840s–1860s (mid-19th century)
- Built: c. 1860–1923

Queensland Heritage Register
- Official name: Mount Abundance Homestead
- Type: state heritage (archaeological, built)
- Designated: 21 October 1992
- Reference no.: 600371
- Significant period: 1860s (historical); 1860s–1880s (fabric)
- Significant components: residential accommodation – main house, kitchen/kitchen house, causeway/ford, gate/s

Mount Abundance Homestead is a heritage-listed homestead on the Warrego Highway, Bungil near Roma, Maranoa Region, Queensland, Australia. It was built from c. 1860 to 1923. It was added to the Queensland Heritage Register on 21 October 1992.

== History ==
This single storeyed timber homestead was built c. 1860 for Stephen Spencer, a squatter from New South Wales who arrived in Queensland in 1857.

The Mount Abundance run was taken up in 1847 by Allan MacPherson, a young squatter from New South Wales. MacPherson had come to Queensland seeking new pastures, and had followed the route of Sir Thomas Mitchell into the Mount Abundance area. Mitchell had named Mount Abundance in 1846 during his expedition to find a route from New South Wales to the Gulf of Carpentaria. Following constant conflicts with local Indigenous people, MacPherson decided Mount Abundance was a dangerous place and in late 1849, MacPherson withdrew his sheep from Mount Abundance, leaving it as a cattle station, and returned to England. In 1856 MacPherson briefly visited Australia at which time he disposed of his pastoral interests, including the sale of Mount Abundance to Stephen Spencer.

Spencer and his family are considered to have been the first European family to settle in the area. It is recorded that when they arrived at the station, it was found to be run down, and the buildings damaged by fire. Rough huts provided temporary quarters until Spencer built a new homestead, and Mount Abundance station is described as the focal point for the district during this period. Spencer ran a supply store, and the station formed a depot for European explorers heading into the western districts. A post office was opened at the homestead in September 1861. Augustus Charles Gregory arrived at Mount Abundance in 1862, and selected a locality for the township which become known as Roma, proclaimed in September that year. The post office at Mount Abundance homestead closed at the end of 1863 when the Roma post office opened.

A stone causeway over Bungeworgorai Creek is believed to be contemporary with the development of Mount Abundance; however little is known about the stonework.

The Spencers are recorded as being interested in agriculture and horticulture, growing the first wheat in the district, and experimenting with grape vines, fig, peach and apricot trees.

By late 1868, Spencer was heavily in debt and in 1869 the Government auctioned the freehold of 175 acres (71 ha) of land on which the homestead and other associated buildings of Mount Abundance Station were erected. The land was purchased by Robert Morehead and Matthew Young of Sydney, who represented the Scottish Australian Investment Company. The stock was auctioned early in 1870, and was also bought by Morehead and Young.

The Scottish Australian Investment Company was active in investing in pastoral property in Queensland between 1860 and 1890. The company had been founded in Scotland, encouraged by reports from Scottish settlers in Australia, and was established with two main purposes: acquisition of land largely for grazing and agricultural pursuits; and granting loans or advances on property mortgages. Despite this two-fold purpose, in its first twenty years in Australia it was primarily a loan and mortgage company. During the early 1860s through the persistence of Robert Morehead as its Australian manager, the company entered into pastoral activity and acquired property in Central/Western Queensland (Bowen Downs) and in the Gulf Country. During the 1860s, the company made a number of loans to Queensland graziers, including Mount Abundance.

An article in 1875 recounted that when the company took possession of Mount Abundance, the "improvements" consisted of only a wretched homestead, and suggested that Spencer was contented to live in his bark-covered buildings till they were old, and dilapidated. It is possible therefore, although not actually stated in the same article, that the company may have erected a new homestead on the property in the late 1860s.

By the mid-1870s, Mount Abundance station was described as one of the largest establishments in the Maranoa and considered to be one of the best grazing properties in Western Queensland. The Head Station comprised a homestead (occupied by the manager), sub-manager's residence, office, store, residences for the storekeeper and bookkeeper, men's quarters, workshops, two large receiving stores and 7 acres (2.8 ha) of garden. Stock returns for 1875 indicate that Mount Abundance was run in conjunction with Nive Downs, a property north of Charleville which had also been acquired by the company. The woolshed to the southwest of the homestead was reputed to be one of the largest in Queensland in the early 1880s. Photographic evidence indicates that the shingle roof of the homestead was clad with iron between 1890 and 1895.

Mount Abundance station was resumed by the Queensland Government in 1923, being regarded as offering the best prospect for successful closer settlement. The main purpose of the resumption was the subdivision of land for the combined raising of wheat and sheep, and to extend agricultural settlement into the western districts. The land was made available for selection in 1927, and the Mount Abundance Homestead block comprising 2,018 acres (817 ha) was selected by Ernest Martyn. Following the death of E Martyn, the property passed to his son PJ Martyn, who died in 1993. The property was further subdivided in the late 1970s, and presently comprises an area of just under 500 hectares (1,200 acres). Of the former complex of buildings, only the homestead and quarters to the rear of the building are extant.

== Description ==
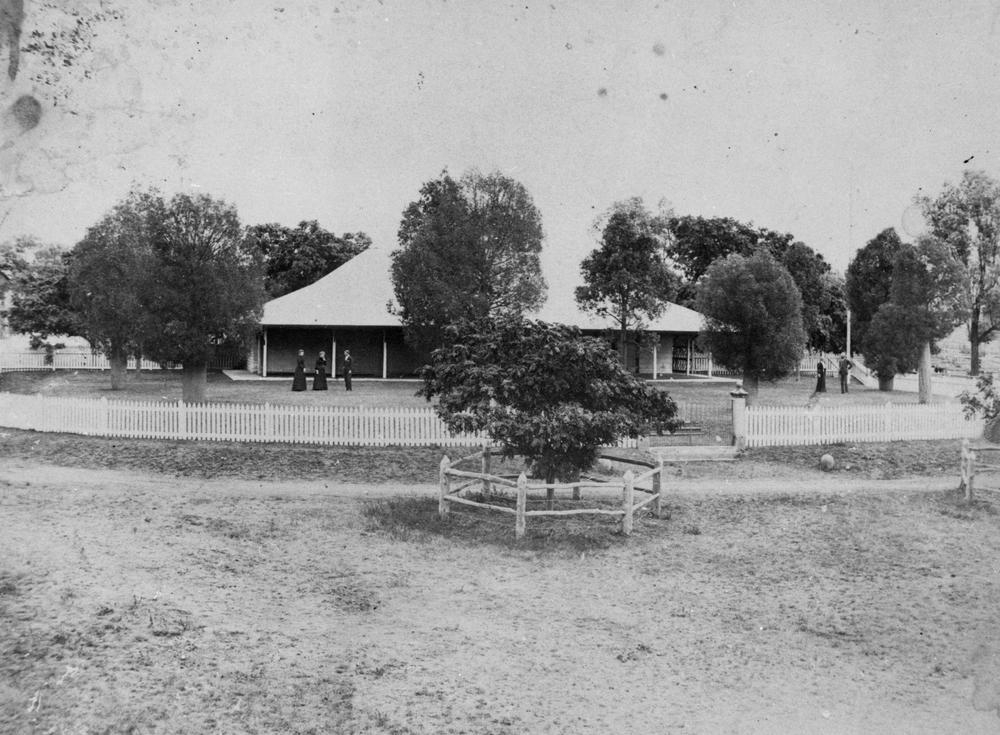
Homestead and grounds, circa 1895

Mount Abundance Homestead, consisting of house and attached quarters, is located approximately 5 kilometres (3.1 mi) west of Roma and 1 kilometre (0.62 mi) south of the main road to Charleville. It is sited on high ground on the southern bank of Bungeworgorai Creek. The approach is via a stone causeway which crosses the creek.

The main house is a single storey structure of three main rooms facing north with a wide verandah on three sides and services rooms on the south side. Part of the verandah has been closed in creating additional rooms. The north side and the portion of the west side which remain open feature a decorative timber valance. The main roof is a moderately pitched hip which reduces in pitch at the verandah line.

The foundations are a system of load bearing bed logs that support floor joists and tongue and groove timber floors. Damage to the foundations has caused the western end of the house to subside. The wall construction is a timber frame with chamferboards to the external walls. The interior walls and ceilings are constructed from tongue and grooved boards which are finished in a dark stained varnish. Two of the main rooms have masonry fireplaces with brick and stone chimneys. Six sets of French doors open out from the main rooms onto the north side verandah. One of these has been altered to create a window.

The roof is clad in corrugated galvanised iron laid over the original timber shingle roof and cantilevered beyond the earlier roof line. The cantilever section is supported by decorative brackets off the timber verandah posts.

The main house connects via a covered way to a single storeyed structure set on low timber stumps which housed quarters and a kitchen. Located to the south of the house, this building has exposed timber-frame construction, timber cladding and a steep corrugated galvanised iron gabled roof with skillion additions.

Little remains of the original fencing but original steps and mounting stones can be seen. Forming the front entrance to the homestead are the original stone gate posts and iron gates. This entrance, which has been relocated, is flanked by large bottle trees.

== Heritage listing ==
Mount Abundance Homestead was listed on the Queensland Heritage Register on 21 October 1992 having satisfied the following criteria.

The place is important in demonstrating the evolution or pattern of Queensland's history.

Mount Abundance Homestead provides rare surviving evidence of the pastoral development of western Queensland from the 1850s.

The resumption of Mount Abundance during the 1920s, and the subsequent division into smaller farming properties and re-settlement during the 1930s, is important in demonstrating the pattern of land use and occupancy in rural Queensland during the early 20th century.

The place demonstrates rare, uncommon or endangered aspects of Queensland's cultural heritage.

Mount Abundance Homestead provides rare surviving evidence of the pastoral development of western Queensland from the 1850s.

The place has potential to yield information that will contribute to an understanding of Queensland's history.

The place has the potential to provide archaeological evidence of building construction techniques from the mid-19th century and of the formerly extensive pastoral station complex, of which only the homestead and attached quarters are known to be extant.

The place has a special association with the life or work of a particular person, group or organisation of importance in Queensland's history.

The Scottish Australian Investment Company, which played an important role in the development of the pastoral industry in Queensland during the latter part of the 19th century, established the reputation of Mount Abundance as a fine grazing property and the association of this company with the property is of importance.
