= Charleville railway station, Queensland =

Railway station in Queensland, Australia

Charleville
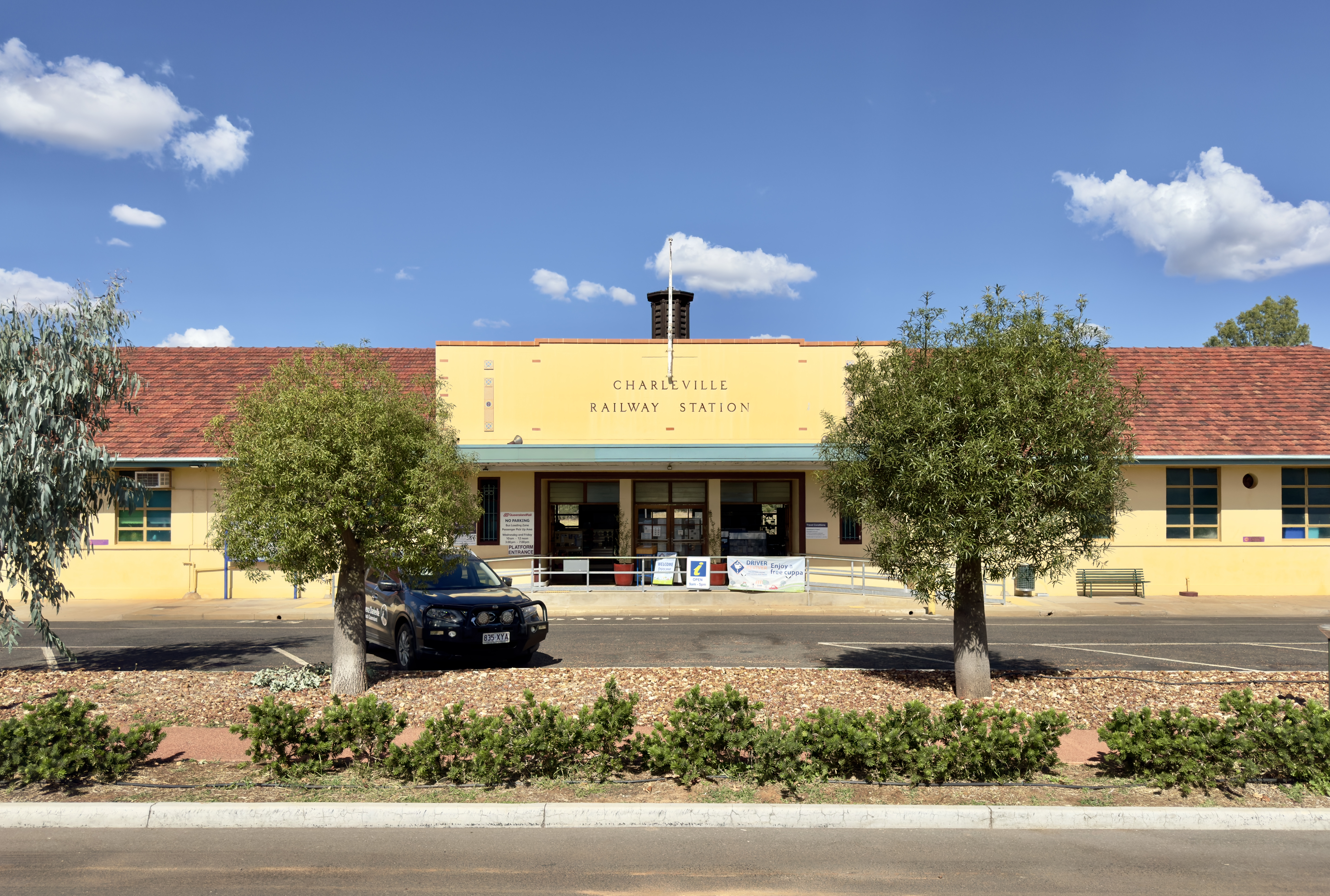
- Station front in 2024

General information
- Location: King Street, Charleville
- Coordinates: 26°24′22″S 146°14′39″E
- Owner: Queensland Rail
- Operator: Traveltrain
- Line: Western
- Platforms: 1

Construction
- Structure type: Ground
- Accessible: Yes

History
- Opened: 1 March 1888
- Rebuilt: 1957

Services
Preceding station	Queensland Rail	Following station
Morven towards Brisbane	The Westlander	Terminus
Location

Charleville railway station, Queensland
- Location within Queensland
- 26.4064°S 146.2441°E
- Location: King Street, Charleville, Shire of Murweh, Queensland, Australia

History
- Design period: 1870s–1890s (late 19th century)
- Built: 1888–1957

Queensland Heritage Register
- Official name: Charleville Railway Station
- Type: state heritage (built)
- Designated: 12 July 2005
- Reference no.: 602368
- Significant period: 1880s (historical)
- Significant components: foyer – entrance, office/s, views to, views from, shed – goods, ticket box/office, railway station, furniture/fittings, platform canopies/awnings (railway), loading bay/dock, track

Charleville railway station is a heritage-listed railway station on the Western line at King Street, Charleville, Shire of Murweh, Queensland, Australia. It was built from 1888 to 1957. It was added to the Queensland Heritage Register on 12 July 2005.

The station has one platform, opening on 1 March 1888 when the line was extended from Morven as the terminus of the line. In 1898, the line was extended west to Cunnamulla.

== Services ==
Charleville is the terminus for Queensland Rail Travel's twice weekly Westlander service from Brisbane. Queensland Rail Travel Trainlink Coach Services (operated by Eckel's Bus Service) operate from Charleville to Cunnamulla and Quilpie.

The station is also used by Greyhound Australia as a scheduled stop for its intercity coach services

Gx493 (Brisbane – Mount Isa)

Gx494 (Mount Isa – Brisbane)

Gx495 (Brisbane – Charleville)

Gx496 (Charleville – Brisbane)

== History ==
Charleville railway station was established by the Queensland Government in 1888 as part of a rail link to service Western Queensland. Heritage-listed structures at the station include the passenger station (opened in 1957) and the goods shed (the core of which was completed in 1888). These structures reflect the historic importance of Charleville as a western railway station.

In Australia, government fostered the development of railways as a means of developing the country and providing social benefits. It was argued that rail would reduce freight costs and save travel time for passengers. An added incentive for rail development in Queensland was the very poor state of the roads. In wet weather especially, this hampered the transport of freight. Railway development became the province of government because of the doubtful economics of building and operating a rail service for the widely distributed, sparse population of rural Queensland. In most cases the capital costs were high in relation to the potential revenue likely to be raised from passengers and freight. These economies imposed a limit on the expansion of railways into remote areas.

The government initially gave priority to developing a railway west of Brisbane. As well as providing graziers and farmers with a more efficient transport link to the coast, railways were seen as a key to encouraging closer settlement west of the Great Dividing Range. The first section of rail, opened on 31 July 1865, was between Ipswich and Bigge's Camp (now Grandchester), 34 kilometres (21 mi) west of Ipswich. By February 1868 the rail was extended to Dalby in the Darling Downs. With a railhead provided for the squatters in this region, extensions further west ceased while the railway was developed elsewhere. It was 1876 before construction of the railway westward from Dalby recommenced. The rail was opened to Roma in 1880, Mitchell in 1885 and Charleville on 1 March 1888. With the opening of the rail to the west, the train became an important transport link for passengers and freight. There were a number of factors that contributed to Charleville's importance as a rail terminus. Situated on the banks of the Warrego River, a natural stock route from New South Wales to Western Queensland, Charleville was already an important regional centre. Moreover, it was to remain the main western rail terminus for at least a decade. The economies of extending the line further west were doubtful. In any case the depression of the 1890s precluded further railway construction for some years. An extension to the line was opened in 1898. However, it was designed to intercept cross-border trade with New South Wales so it was south southwest from Charleville to Cunnamulla rather than west. A further development west did not begin until 1911 when a line to Quilpie was commenced as part of the ill-fated Great Western Railway scheme envisaged by Queensland Premier, William Kidston. Until the opening of this line in 1917, Charleville remained the most western railhead. Also, Charleville was made a locomotive depot due to its distance from the closest existing facility at Roma.

Charleville's importance meant that the station was provided with more than the usual station facilities. By August 1888, most of the station structures were completed. These included platform, tank, booking and telegraph offices, goods shed, stationmaster's house, and guards, enginemen and firemen's cottages. Engine and carriage sheds were moved from Mitchell to Charleville. Cattle and sheep yards were in place by January 1889 and by 1916, a 50-ton weighbridge had been added to the complex. The weighbridge currently on the site is 40 long tons (41 t) and appears to post-date 1976.

The original wooden station building was destroyed by fire on 6 July 1954 and the engine shed was blown down in a severe windstorm in October 2003. Most of the other 1888 buildings appear to have been either removed or demolished.

The Goods Shed has survived a serious fire and has undergone significant modification. On 4 April 1900, a fire destroyed the entire contents of the Goods Shed, then rented from the Government by N Nielsen. It seems that no substantial modifications were made to the structure as a result of this fire. The shed has been upgraded at least twice since that time. In the 1920s, an extension of some 12 by 3.7 metres (39 by 12 ft) to the platform at the eastern end was approved. Then in 1962, major white ant damage in the office and deterioration of the timber platform was reported. Repair work was delayed because a complete rearrangement of the yard was under consideration but as this did not proceed, tenders were called for renovations in 1974. Substantial changes were made to the structure including a new goods office, reconstruction of much of the timber platform, a new concrete platform and a new toilet.

Following the destruction of the original passenger station, a new station building was opened in 1957. It was designed by Queensland Railways Department's architectural office under the supervision of Charles Da Costa and erected by K D Morris and Sons, Brisbane. Da Costa had been a specialist in re-inforced concrete design for at least thirty years. He trained as a pupil of T. S. Martin of Sydney from 1905, joining Queensland Railways in 1907 as a Junior Draftsman. After retrenchment in 1921, he began private practice as an architect and structural designer in Brisbane. Later he worked for Burns Philp and Company and then, in 1935 rejoined Queensland Railways as an Architect. He became Principal Architect in 1938 and retired in 1955. Charleville railway station may have been one of his last designs before retiring.

The building was more substantial than its predecessor. It was built in an era of economic prosperity augmented by a wool industry that was booming in the mid-1950s and in an environment of Government investment in post-war rehabilitation of rail infrastructure. However, at the opening ceremony, the Honorable T Moore indicated that the new building also reflected the continued importance of Charleville as a western railhead:

"Mindful of the important contribution made by the Charleville district to the earnings of the Railway Department (the revenue from outward and inward traffic for the last financial year totalled £246,856 and £186,369 respectively) and the wealth of the State generally, the Government decided that the wooden station building which was destroyed by fire in 1954 should be replaced by a modern structure, worthy of this prosperous and progressive town and district, one which would meet, for many years to come, the increasing needs of the Department's customers and a building which would provide the maximum of comfort for travellers to and from the West..."

Charleville was the third busiest goods station on the Western Line after Quilpie and Cunnamulla and the busiest passenger station at the time, earning £26,810 in revenue from passengers in 1954/55 ahead of Roma (£17,346) and Dalby (£10,816).

The station, as designed in 1954, was a large building almost 92 metres (302 ft) long and 12.5 metres (41 ft) wide with a 162.7-metre-long (534 ft) concrete platform shaded with cantilever awnings extending well beyond the northeastern end of the building. A 46-metre-long (151 ft) loading dock was built at the north end of the building with access to King Street. The entrance opened to a spacious terrazzo tiled vestibule located in the centre of the building. Some 26 other rooms made up the building including Tranship Room, Cloak and Luggage Room, Parcels Office, Station Master and Assistant Station Master's Offices, Clerks' Office, Telegraph Room, Ticket Office, Ladies Waiting Room, Refreshment Rooms, Store Rooms, Guards and Porters' Rooms, Mail Room and Lavatories.

The design of the building, according to Moore, was influenced by the local climate. The reinforced concrete walls were designed to insulate the interior against extremes of temperature. The building was provided with projecting eaves to provide shade and large windows to capture breezes. The furniture in the building, a quantity of which is still extant, was manufactured partly by contractors and partly by the railway's Northgate workshops.

Charleville is the only station of its design on the Queensland Rail network. Hughenden also has a large concrete station. However, it was built some ten years earlier than Charleville, is less than half the size and is made of pre-cast concrete beams not reinforced concrete.

With the greater use of other modes of transport such as road and air coupled with a decline in rural population, passenger numbers on the Western Line have declined sharply since the 1950s. Passenger traffic through Charleville is now much less than it was when the station was built in 1957.

== Description ==
Charleville railway station is located on King Street, on the southeastern outskirts of the township. The buildings and structures of cultural heritage significance include the passenger station (1957) and the goods shed (1888 with later modifications). The passenger station is a substantial concrete reinforced building opening onto King Street, the goods shed is a corrugated iron building south-west of the station on the opposite side of the railway lines and the weighbridge is a small structure north east of the passenger station.

=== Passenger Station ===
The passenger station is a long single-storey building running parallel to King Street. It has a simple, relatively severe architectural style. The walls are cream and are constructed of reinforced concrete. The hipped roof is clad with red terracotta tiles. A section of the building at each end is recessed from the front elevation. The roof line is broken at these points. The main entrance is located in the middle of this elevation and opens onto a car park off King Street. It is topped with a parapet and shaded by a cantilevered awning. A bronze-sheeted lantern elevator symmetrically placed above the entrance vestibule, projects from the roof. A raised platform runs the full length of the elevation facing the railway lines. This is shaded by a cantilevered awning.

The entrance facade is the most prominent feature of the front elevation. Together with its parapet, it projects slightly forward of the front of the building. Access is obtained through three flat arches placed symmetrically about the centre of the facade. A tall narrow window is located on each side of the three arches. Each of the entrances is very similar in form. A pair of maple double doors within each arch is approached via two granites steps and a shallow alcove. The double doors open in the middle and are topped with a pair of louvred fanlights. Each door comprises eight lights separated by narrow mullions with a pair of chrome push rails placed horizontally across the door about halfway up. A wide stainless steel panel is fitted to the bottom of each door. The words "Charleville Railway Station" are formed from projecting metal letters on the parapet above the awning over the entrance. A centrally positioned flag pole is fitted immediately above these words.

Large steel framed windows with reeded obscure glass open from the front elevation. Most of these windows comprise eight lights with horizontally pivoting sashes to maximize ventilation. Apart from the front entrance, there are a further three doors along the front of the building. Each entrance is bracketed with fluted pilasters and provided with a shallow concrete step. They are all fitted with double wooden doors and a pair of louvred fanlights above. Each door has a small fixed window near the top.

Like the front elevation, the platform elevation of the station presents a long, low aspect. A wide cantilevered awning with exposed, steel supporting girders extends the full length of this elevation. A series of doors and windows open onto the platform. The windows are similar in design to those in the front of the building. Louvred fanlights are fitted above each of the doors. Public access to the platform is gained through a set of collapsible metal gates.

The front entrance opens into a spacious vestibule with a high ceiling and a polished terrazzo floor. A ticket office opens into the vestibule which functions as the main thoroughfare for passengers moving through to the platform. Maple plywood panelling lines the walls to a height of approximately two metres. A series of painted wooden benches are placed around the walls. A ladies waiting room opens from the vestibule. This is a large room provided with wooden benches. The women's lavatory is accessed through this room.

The remaining rooms are functional in style with undecorated concrete walls and simple fittings. The fibrous plaster ceilings are high and large louvered windows are positioned high in the internal walls to allow airflow through the building.

Two garden beds are positioned along the side of the car park close to the edge of King Street. These bracket the main entrance and from the street. Trees frame the entrance facade.

=== Goods Shed ===
The Goods Shed (formerly operated by Aurizon) is a large, unlined, corrugated-iron and steel clad building. It has a gabled roof clad in new steel cladding supported on original trusses. Along the elevation opposite the rail, the roof projects and is supported on angle struts. The building is designed for access by both road and rail goods transport and encloses a large open space which functions as a goods storage area and loading docks. A newer office is attached to the outside of the shed at the south western end.

Access by road transport is gained by a series of large steel roller shutters. Six doors are spaced along the elevation opposite the railway lines towards the south east. Another door provides access via a new concrete ramp through the north eastern end. All of the doors open onto a raised, concrete platform inside the shed which extends about two thirds of its width for its full length.

The shed is built over a railway line. The rail enters the south western end of the shed and runs the full length of the internal concrete platform before exiting from the north eastern end. The original, large, hinged wooden doors open outwards to provide access into the shed for rolling stock.

The office located at the south western end is a small lined room outside of the main part of the shed. Double swinging glass doors provide access from the office into the main part of the shed. Another door opens to the outside of the building. A long, waist high counter runs almost the full width of the room facing the double doors. An enclosed corner of the room functions as a supervisor's office.

== Heritage listing ==
Charleville Railway Station was listed on the Queensland Heritage Register on 12 July 2005 having satisfied the following criteria.

The place is important in demonstrating the evolution or pattern of Queensland's history.

Charleville station is important in demonstrating the pattern of Queensland's history. Opened in 1888 when the rail link to Western Queensland was first built. Charleville station was the western rail terminus, serving goods and passenger traffic. It remained the terminus for a decade and one of the most important stations on the Western Railway until at least the 1960s.

The complex, which includes a goods shed (1888) and a substantial, concrete passenger station (1957), provides physical evidence of the historic importance of rail as a transport link to the coast and of Charleville as a busy railway station servicing Western Queensland. Charleville was the third busiest goods station and the busiest passenger station on the Western Line prior to the 1960s. The substantial scale of the passenger station in particular is indicative of an era of rehabilitation of rail infrastructure that occurred in an environment of economic prosperity in Queensland following World War II.

The place demonstrates rare, uncommon or endangered aspects of Queensland's cultural heritage.

The passenger station is significant for its rarity value. It is the only station of its design and the only station on the Queensland Rail network with reinforced concrete walls, designed to accommodate the climatic conditions of Charleville.

The place is important in demonstrating the principal characteristics of a particular class of cultural places.

The passenger station building (1957) remains substantially intact and is important in demonstrating the principal characteristics of its type. These characteristics include the use of reinforced concrete exterior walls to insulate the interior against temperature extremes; design features such as projecting eaves to shade the windows and large windows to capture breezes; and the interior arrangement of rooms that provided for clear demarcation between public areas, offices and service rooms. It is also a good example of the work of Queensland Rail design staff under the supervision of Charles Da Costa in the 1950s.

The place is important because of its aesthetic significance.

The passenger station building and the front grounds, including a small garden along the road alignment, have aesthetic value. The building exhibits a visually pleasing symmetry in the street elevation and in its garden setting makes an important contribution to the streetscape of King Street.
