= Charleville railway station =

Railway station in Charleville County Cork, Ireland

Coordinates: 52°20′47″N 8°39′15″W

Charleville An Ráth
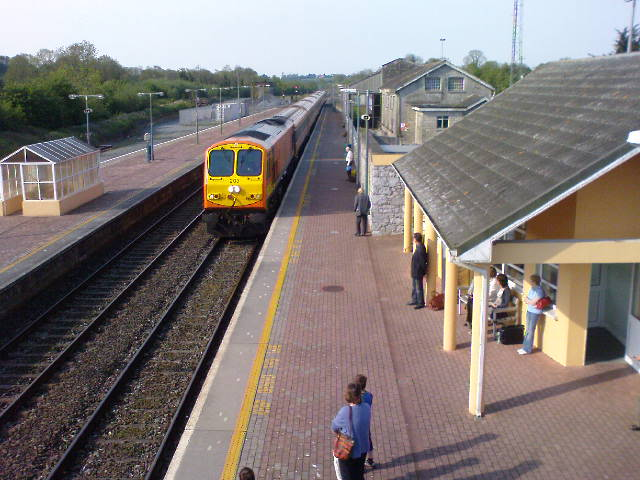
- Charleville station in 2008

General information
- Location: Ireland
- Owner: Iarnród Éireann
- Operator: Iarnród Éireann
- Platforms: 3

Construction
- Structure type: At-grade

Other information
- Station code: 19

History
- Original company: Great Southern and Western Railway
- Pre-grouping: Great Southern and Western Railway
- Post-grouping: Great Southern Railways

Key dates
- 1849: Station opened
Location

Charleville railway station is a station on the Cork to Dublin Railway line in Ireland.

It is located a mile outside the town of Charleville, mostly in North County Cork, Ireland though the border with County Limerick, Ireland crosses the track alignment diagonally, towards the northern end of the platforms. It is a small station with three through platforms, though the third is rarely used.

Although there was a commuter service to Charleville for numerous years, it was discontinued in 2004 due to low take-up.

In December 2005, services were further reduced to the station. In particular, the 21:00 services from Heuston to Cork no longer stop there.

The station opened on 19 March 1849 and was closed for goods traffic on 6 September 1976.

Until March 1967 Charleville was also the junction for the Cork Direct Line, the shorter route between Limerick and Cork which left the Limerick to Foynes line at Patrickswell.

== Services ==
Preceding station	Iarnród Éireann	Following station
Limerick Junction	Intercity; Dublin-Cork railway line	Mallow
