= The Westlander =

Passenger rail service in Queensland, Australia

Overview
- Service type: Passenger train
- Status: Operational
- First service: August 1954
- Current operator: Queensland Rail

Route
- Termini: Brisbane; Charleville
- Distance travelled: 740 km (460 mi)
- Average journey time: 17 hours
- Service frequency: Twice per week

The Westlander is an Australian passenger train operated by Queensland Rail on the Main and Western lines between Brisbane and the outback town of Charleville.

== History ==
In the 1888 timetable, the train from Brisbane to Roma was officially called the Western Mail, with some runs extended through to Morven. With the opening of the line from Morven to Charleville on the 1st March 1888 the train was again extended.

In the early 1950s, Queensland Rail began planning for a new generation of steel air-conditioned carriages. Consequently, work was started on one at Ipswich Workshops, with a further 8 ordered from Commonwealth Engineering. Ten diesel locomotives were to be imported from America to haul these carriages. On 5 June 1952, the route between Brisbane and Cunnamulla was announced as one to be served by these new carriages, with the tentative name The Westerner. By 1953, with the first train completed, it was announced the 5th train would form The Westlander, with an estimated lead time of four months to produce each train.

Even before the service commenced, there was community opposition to its timing. The train was expected to arrive in Charleville late in the afternoon, meaning workers would have to work late into the night delivering mail and goods to their final destination. There were consistent complaints made to Transport Minister J Duggan and Premier V Gair, however it was concluded that the timetable would not be adjusted. Duggan stated that this was because there would be insufficient time to service the train in Mayne (Brisbane), it would result in an unreasonably early departure on the return trip and that there was a need to stable the dining car in Roma.

The inaugural run of The Westlander was on 24 August 1954, replacing the Western Mail and its wooden carriages. The route from Brisbane to Cunnamulla was 973 kilometres (605 mi), with a connecting service to Quilpie from Charleville, 777 kilometres (483 mi) from Brisbane. Initially the Quilpie connecting train was not air-conditioned, so in 1967 a generator was fitted to an insulated van to provide power for an air-conditioned sitting car and mechanical refrigeration for the van to provide this comfort on the Quilpie service.

Later The Westlander was divided at Charleville, the service to Quilpie (3Q02) being nicknamed the Flying Flea and consisted of two passenger carriages, a guards van and power van. The remainder of the train (3V02) headed to Cunnamulla via Westgate and Wyandra. In 1970 the Flea had the Honour of being the fastest train in Queensland, with an average speed of 49 kilometres per hour (30 mph)

At about 5.30 a.m. on Friday 6 November 1987, Westlander train 3V02, hauled by 1700 Class Locomotive 1706 was derailed at the nearby Bindango railway siding between Hodgson and Muckadilla, approximately 25 kilometres (16 mi) west of Roma. An infant was burnt to death in the resulting fire. Investigations revealed that the points had been deliberately changed from the main railway line to divert the train into the siding. 1706 was written off as a result of the accident. The police offered a reward of $50,000 for information leading to the person responsible.

The return service (3907) departed Cunnamulla at 09:00 arriving in Brisbane at noon the next day. Even with the line speed from Cunnamulla being 30 km/h (19 mph), the train was still preferred by many due to the lack of quality roads at the time. By 1957 freight wagons were also attached to the train, including louvred steel QRX and QLX-T wagons, and MPR refrigerated wagons. Up to 16 vehicles could make up the train. Passenger services beyond Charleville to Cunnamulla (3V02) and Quilpie (3Q02) were withdrawn in 1994.

== Today ==
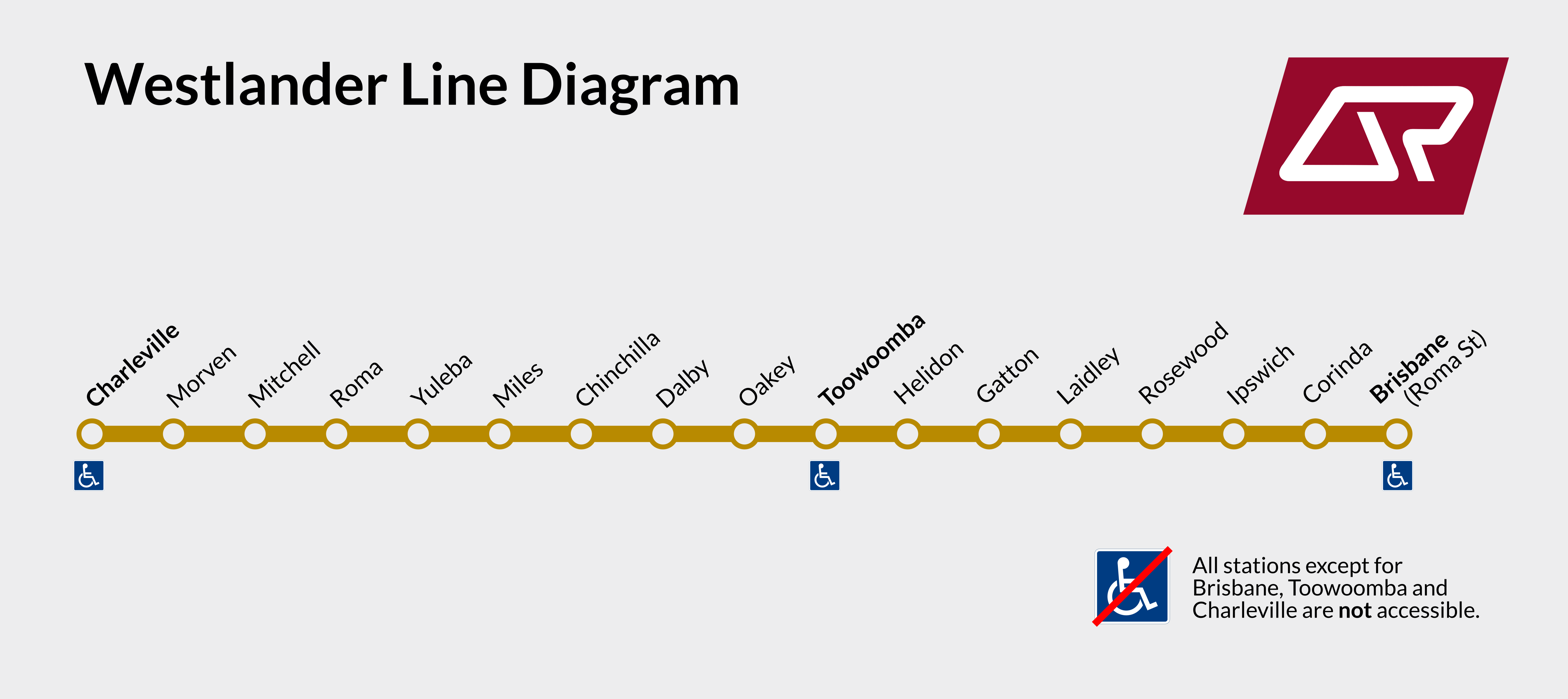
Route diagram of the Westlander

As at October 2020, the train runs twice weekly to Charleville with a journey time of 17 hours. Connecting coach services operate to Cunnamulla and Quilpie.

The westbound service (3S86) departs from platform ten at Roma Street railway station at 7:15 pm on Tuesdays and at 6:55 pm on Thursdays and arrives at Charleville station at 11:45 am on Wednesdays and Fridays.

The eastbound service (3987) departs from Charleville Railway Station at 6:15 pm on Wednesdays and Fridays and arrives at platform ten at Roma Street Railway Station at 11:40 am on Thursdays and 11:25 am on Saturdays.

Crews for the Westlander are based at Toowoomba, Chinchilla and Roma.

The train currently consists of:

- 3 L series cars (1 LSCL Lounge/Staff Car, 1 LAL Sitting Car and 1 LBL Sitting Car)
- a QPB Power-Baggage Car

The QPB Power-Baggage Car was only enabled to run on this service because of the tunnel clearance-enabling works which were undertaken by Queensland Rail in early 2020.

The dining and sleeping (M series) cars were withdrawn from 1 January 2015, with catering now provided by at seat snack packs delivered at mealtimes.

On 16 June 2021, a $1 million business case was announced by the Queensland government to investigate upgrading the trains used for The Westlander, the Spirit of the Outback and Inlander services.

== Subsidy levels ==
In 2016, the service was estimated to have carried 3,677 people in the previous financial year, with the effective subsidy paid by the Queensland State Government for each passenger amounting to an estimated $4,007 (total subsidy $14.7m)

In 2021, the service carried 2,999 people in previous financial year, with the effective subsidy paid by the Queensland Government for each passenger at $4,928.90.
