= Western railway line, Queensland =

Railway line in Queensland, Australia

Western railway line

Technical
- Track gauge: 1,067 mm (3 ft 6 in)
- Train protection system: ATP from Toowoomba to Willowburn

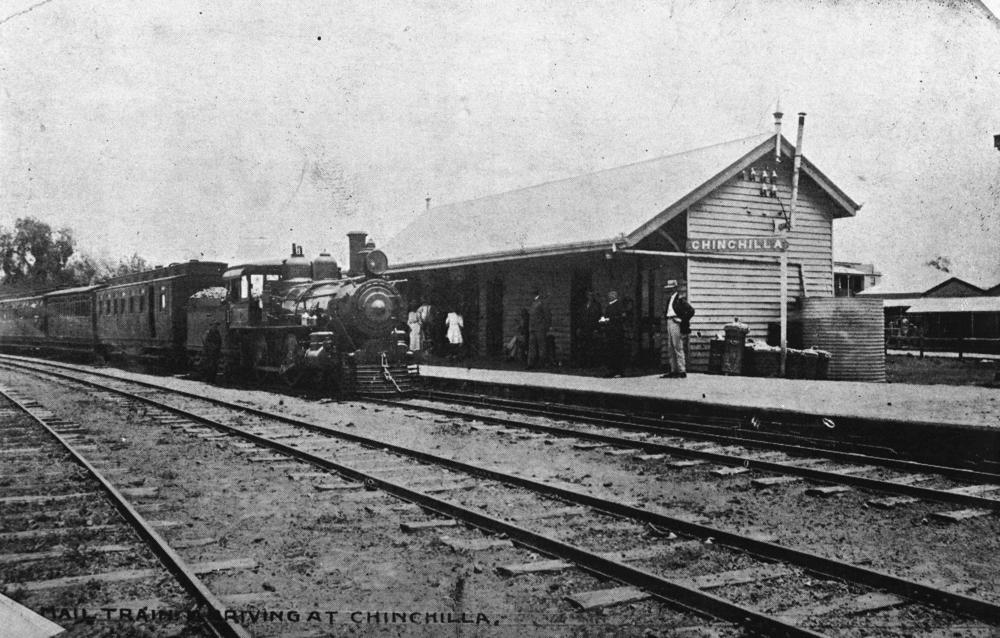
Mail train arriving at Chinchilla, 1908

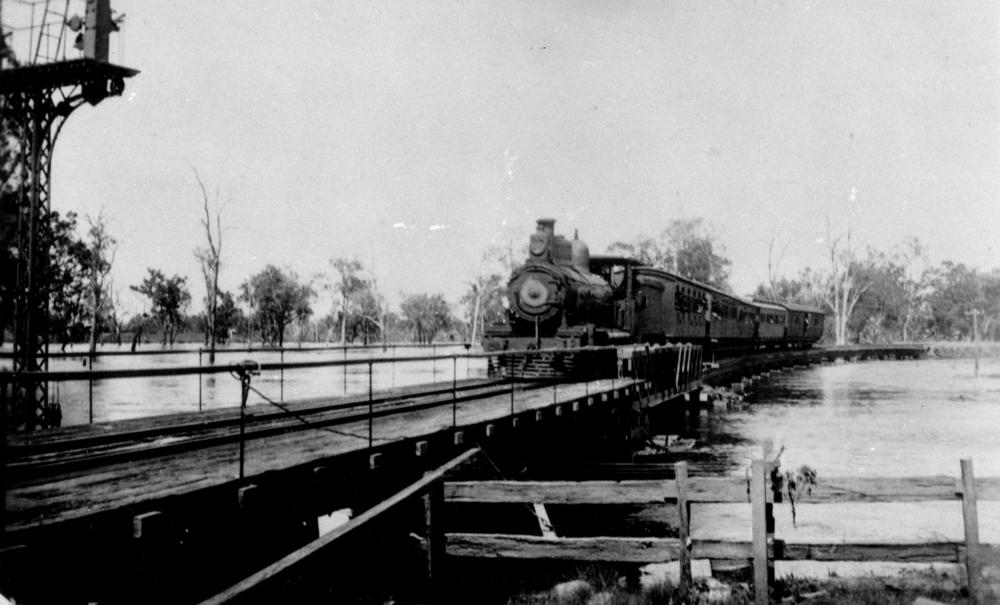
Passenger train on the Bridge across Charley's Creek, Chinchilla during the 1921-22 floods

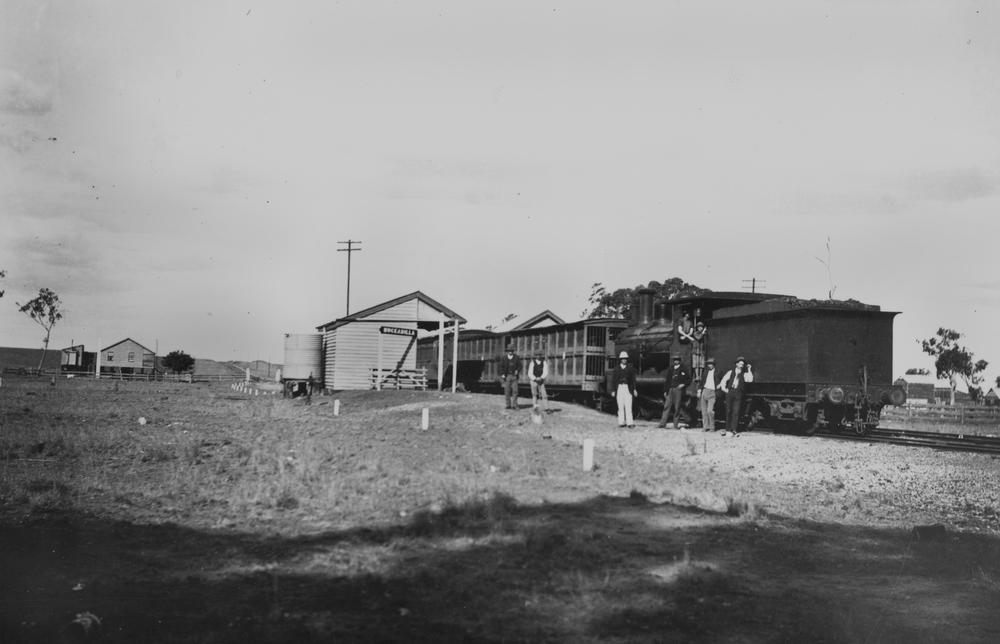
Muckadilla station, between Roma and Mitchell, ~1920

The Western railway line is a narrow gauge (1,067 mm or 3 ft 6 in) railway, connecting the south-east and south-west regions of Queensland, Australia. It commences at Toowoomba, at the end of the Main Line railway from Brisbane, and extends west 810 km to Cunnamulla, passing through the major towns of Dalby, Roma and Charleville, although services on the 184 km section from Westgate to Cunnamulla have been suspended since 2011. The Queensland Government was the first railway operator in the world to adopt narrow gauge for a main line, and this remains the system-wide gauge.

== History ==
The initial section of the Western line was built from Toowoomba to Dalby, opening 16 April 1868 (the first section of the Southern line, from Gowrie Junction, about 12 km west of Toowoomba, to Warwick, was opened in 1871, and bypassed in 1915). The line traverses relatively flat, easy country, gradually descending from 590m asl to 343m asl at Dalby.

From Dalby, the line was extended to Roma from 1877, opening on 16 September 1880, then to Charleville from 1883, opening 1 March 1888. The line was then extended in a southerly direction, following the Warrego River to Cunnamulla, opening on 10 October 1898. The country is undulating but mostly level, with Roma being 302m asl, Charleville 300m asl, and Cunnamulla 192m asl.

No significant earthworks were required for the construction of the line west of Dalby, and the rate of construction for all further sections was largely dictated by the annual funding allocations made by the Queensland government of the day.

The line was built to provide reliable transportation to facilitate the development and settlement of the southern Queensland interior by European settlers. It fulfilled that role until the adjacent road network was gradually upgraded to all-weather status from the 1960s-1990s, during which time the line gradually lost most traffic. Despite that, there remains a twice weekly passenger service as far as Charleville, and seasonal cattle trains from Quilpie. Following the 2010–11 Queensland floods, freight services were suspended between Westgate and Cunnamulla, and have not resumed. In September 2014, a truck carrying ammonium nitrate exploded near Wyandra, damaging the nearby railway bridge, which has not been repaired, effectively closing the line between Westgate and Cunnamulla.

In recent years, new coal mines near Chinchilla and Dalby have transported increasing tonnages (1–2M tonnes/month) for export from the Port of Brisbane at Fisherman Islands, which is now the main source of freight on the line. Grain is the other major, though seasonal freight.

=== Standard of construction ===
The current speed and load limits on various sections reflects the level of traffic on them. From Toowoomba to Roma the rail is 41 kg/m (83 lb/yd), 25–50% of the sleepers are steel, and the speed limit is 80 km/h (50 mph), 70 km/h (43 mph) west of Miles and for coal trains east of there, with an axle load of 15.75 t (15.50 long tons; 17.36 short tons).

West of Roma to Westgate the line speed remains 70 km/h (43 mph) though the rail is 30 kg/m (60.5 lb/yd). From there to Cunnamulla and Quilpie the line remains largely as originally constructed, with light rail (21 kg/m or 42.3 lb/yd), all timber sleepers, 10-tonne (9.8-long-ton; 11-short-ton) axle load, minimal earthworks and a line speed of 60 km/h (37 mph).

== Branch lines ==
A series of branch lines were built to connect to the Western line, and these are listed from east to west below.

Pengarry Junction – Crows Nest, 55 km, opened December 1886, closed 1961.

Although not part of the Western line complex, the opening of an 18 km direct line from Toowoomba to Wyreema on the Southern line in 1915 bypassed the Gowrie Junction – Wyreema section, though that section remained open to serve local traffic until 1961.

Kingsthorpe – Haden, 33 km, opened December 1910, closed 1964.

Oakey – Cooyar, 63 km, opened April 1913, closed 1964.

Oakey – Cecil Plains, 63 km, opened April 1919, out of service since 1994.

Dalby – Jandowae, 48 km, opened August 1914, this line services a significant grain growing district and was upgraded to 15 tonne axle load in the 1990s, but subsequently closed on 25 June 2013.

Dalby – Bell, 38 km, opened April 1906, out of service since 1994.

Dalby – Glenmorgan, 165 km, opened in sections between 1911 and 1931, Section from Meandarra to Glenmorgan remains booked out of use by both Aurizon and Watco Australia and rail traffic remains suspended beyond Meandarra as of 26 June 2013

Chinchilla – Barakula. In 1911 the Queensland Railway Department built a tramway from Chinchilla to Wongongera (now Barakula) to transport railway sleepers made from logs taken from the state forest at Barakula and milled at the Barakula sawmill (approx 26.4279°S 150.5044°E). The route of the Barakula tramway was based on an earlier plan to construct a railway line from Chinchilla to Taroom that was subsequently abandoned in favour of a railway line from Miles to Taroom. The tramway operated until 1970.

Miles – Wandoan 70 km, opened December 1914. This line was approved to be built to Taroom, a further 60 km, but that never occurred. The Wandoan-Taroom area has significant undeveloped coal deposits, and construction of a line from Wandoan through Taroom to connect with the Moura coal line system has been proposed to provide access to the coal export terminal at Gladstone. The Wandoan Line is currently booked out of use by both Aurizon and Watco Australia and rail traffic on the line remains suspended

Roma – Injune, opened between 1916 and 30 June 1920, 101 km, closed 31 December 1966

Westgate – Quilpie, 201 km. In 1910 the Queensland government adopted a significant plan to build a railway on the Queensland section of the alignment proposed from Bourke in western NSW, to Darwin in the NT, known as the 'Great Western Railway'. To connect to that alignment, construction began in 1911 from Westgate (21 km south of Charleville) in a westerly direction. The First World War hampered construction, which ceased in April 1917, making Quilpie the effective terminus. Despite suggestions after the war that construction be recommended, the GWR project was never re-activated. Quilpie (population 560) became the loading point for significant numbers of cattle from western areas. The line is still known as the Great Western line by QR.

== Services ==
=== Passenger services ===
Initially all trains were 'mixed', carrying both goods and passengers. It was an efficient method for areas with low population, and whilst not quick by today's standards, it was still a vast improvement on the horse-drawn coaches and wagons. When the line opened to Mitchell in 1885, the accelerated daily mixed with travelling post office left Brisbane at 5.30am, reached Roma at 9.10pm and arrived at Mitchell at 11.50pm.

The first *travelling post office (TPO) was introduced in 1877, initially occupying the second class compartments of two composite carriages on the Brisbane-Dalby train. Four wheel vans were built specially for the service later that year. The Post Office supplied the staff to collect, sort and deliver mail on the TPO vans. The TPO was extended to Roma upon the opening of that extension, and extended as far as Charleville upon further line extensions being opened. The TPOs were removed as a cost saving measure in 1932.

The January 1888 timetable labelled the train the 'Western Mail', and when the line opened to Charleville later that year the train was extended once per week, reaching the new terminus at 6.30am Sunday. It departed for Brisbane at 10pm Sundays, taking 24 hours for the return journey. Compared to a weeks' journey by stage coach, this was high speed travel for the day.

By the time the Cunnamulla extension opened, the Western Mail was running twice a week to Charleville, with one service per week continuing on to the terminus. Second class sleepers were introduced at this time.

Foot-warmers were introduced to the first class compartments on passenger services in 1911, and provided each winter until 1958.

'Suburban' services were provide from Toowoomba - Wyreema via Willowburn between 1918 and 1926.

A dining car was introduced in 1931, attached to the train from Mitchell to Cunnamulla and return. When the air-conditioned Westlander was introduced in 1954, replacing the earlier Western Mail Train, the dining car was attached at Roma. In 1967 a generator was fitted to an insulated van to provide power for an air-conditioned sitting car and mechanical refrigeration for the van to provide this comfort on the Quilpie service.

=== Freight services ===
Four coal mines currently rail coal (through Aurizon) to the Port of Brisbane. Cameby Downs mine is ~25 km east of Miles, meaning a 350 km journey to the coal terminal. Kogan Creek and Wilkie Creek mines are about 270 km from the Port, and New Acland mine is about 200 km from coal terminal.

== See also ==
- Rail transport in Queensland
- Travelling post office, Queensland
