= Warkon =

- Suburb
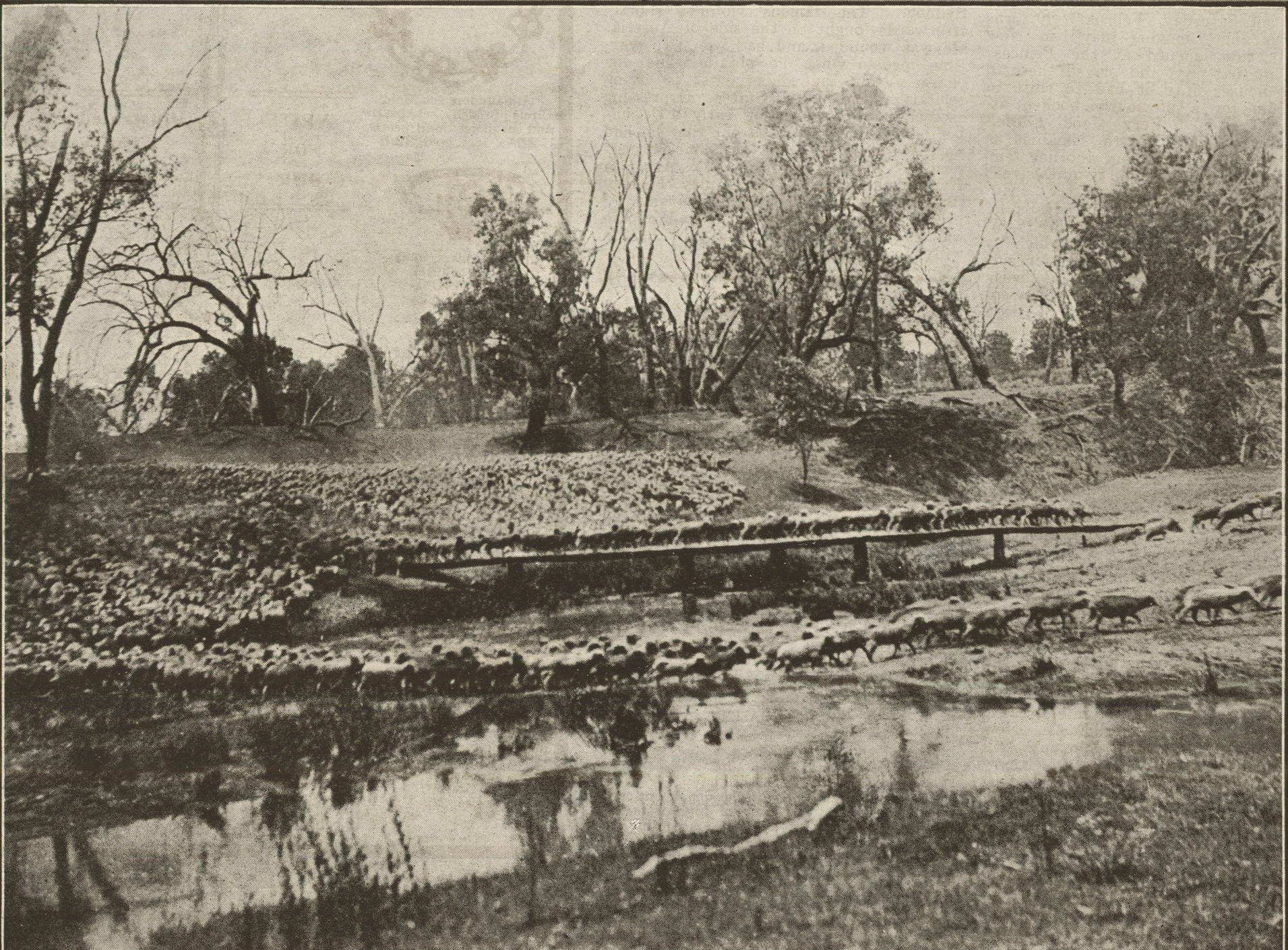
- 17,000 sheep cross the Condamine River at Warkon Station, 1917

- Interactive map of Warkon
- Coordinates: 26.9222°S 149.4108°E
- Country: Australia
- State: Queensland
- LGA: Maranoa Region
- Location: 37.4 km (23.2 mi) NE of Surat; 56.9 km (35.4 mi) SSE of Wallumbilla; 74.4 km (46.2 mi) SE of Roma; 296 km (184 mi) WNW of Toowoomba; 424 km (263 mi) WNW of Brisbane

Government
  - State electorate: Warrego
  - Federal division: Maranoa

Area
  - Total: 942.5 km^{2} (363.9 sq mi)

Population
  - Total: 30 (2021 census)
  - Density: 0.032/km^{2} (0.082/sq mi)
- Time zone: UTC+10:00 (AEST)
- Postcode: 4417
Suburbs around Warkon
Yuleba South	Yuleba South	Jackson South
Wallumbilla South	Warkon	Moraby
Noorindoo	Glenmorgan	Yulabilla

Warkon is a rural locality in the Maranoa Region, Queensland, Australia. In the 2021 census, Warkon had a population of 30 people.

== Geography ==
The Balonne River (a continuation of the Condamine River) forms the southern boundary of the locality and a number of creek flow through the locality into the river. Bingi Crossing (also written as Bingie Crossing) is the ford on the Balonnne River near the current River Road (27.0188°S 149.3763°E) which connects Warkon with neighbouring Noorindoo.

The Roma-Condamine Road passes from west to east through the locality.

The land use is predominantly cattle grazing and there are a number of areas of state forests: Yuleba State Forest, Wallabella State Forest 1, and Tinowon State Forest.

== History ==
The locality name derives from a pastoral run name used from 1850 and is an Aboriginal word group (possibly from the Mandandanji language) meaning plenty of water.

Warkon Station was established on the Balonne River in 1850 by Henry Bingham, one of the early settlers in the Maranoa district. From 1858 to 1872 the property was operated by Alexander and Harriet Barlow. Warkon Station had Aboriginal workers from a number of different language groups. Harriet Barlow was one of the first people to record the Aboriginal languages of this region, which she called Coongarri, Wirri-Wirri, Ngoorie, Yowaleri, Cooinburri, Begumble, Cambooble and Parrungoom. She published her work in a number of journals. The Warkon Station was subsequently owned by Leonard Reynolds Schwennesen who added further notes to Barlow's material. The State Library of Queensland hold a collection of the manuscripts of Barlow and Schwennesen.

Retreat Provisional School opened circa 1896. It operated from at least 1899 to 1905 as a half-time school in conjunction with Nellybri Provisional School (meaning the two schools shared a single teacher). In 1906 Retreat Provisional School became a full-time school but closed later that year. Retreat is a pastoral property in Warkon (26.989°S 149.296°E).

St Paul's Anglican Church opened at Bingie Crossing circa June 1914. It was served by the Bush Brotherhood. Its last service was 20 December 1942.

Yuleba Creek State School opened on 23 January 1967 and closed on 31 December 1999. It was on Roma Condamine Road (26.8884°S 149.4429°E) with Yuleba Creek flowing beside the school.

== Demographics ==
In the 2016 census, Warkon had a population of 33 people.

In the 2021 census, Warkon had a population of 30 people.

== Education ==
There are no schools in Warkon. The nearest government primary schools are:

- Yuleba State School in Yuleba to the north
- Dulacca State School in Dulacca to the north-east
- Glenmorgan State School in Glenmorgan to the south
- Surat State School in Surat to the south-west

The nearest government secondary schools are:

- Wallumbilla State School (to Year 10) in Wallumbilla to the north-west
- Surat State School (to Year 10) in Surat to the south-west

However, students in the east of the locality will be too distant to attend these secondary schools. Also, there are no secondary schools offering education to Year 12 nearby. The alternatives are distance education and boarding school.
