= Roma–Condamine Road =

Road in Queensland, Australia

Roma–Condamine Road Condamine Highway Queensland

General information
- Type: Rural road
- Length: 115 km (71 mi)

Major junctions
- West end: Carnarvon Highway, Tingun
- Wallumbilla South Road; Yuleba–Surat Road; Dulacca South Road
- East end: Leichhardt Highway, Condamine

Location(s)
- Major settlements: Warkon, Moraby

Roma–Condamine Road is a continuous 115-kilometre (71 mi) road route in the Maranoa and Western Downs local government areas of Queensland, Australia. It is a state-controlled regional road (number 344), rated as a local road of regional significance (LRRS).

== Route description ==
The road (known locally as Condamine Highway) starts at an intersection with the Carnarvon Highway in the locality of Tingun in the Maranoa region, about 46 kilometres (29 mi) south-east of the town of Roma. It runs slightly south of east, crossing the south-western extremity of Wallumbilla South and passing the exit to Wallumbilla South Road (see below) to the north-east. It then follows the boundary between Wallumbilla South and Noorindoo before entering Warkon. Next it passes the exit to Yuleba-Surat Road to the south-west, runs north-east concurrent with that road, and passes its exit to the north-east.

Continuing east across Warkon, the road passes through two sections of the Yuleba State Forest and enters Moraby in the Western Downs region, where it transits another section of the forest and passes the exit to Dulacca South Road to the north-west before entering Pine Hills. It continues east, crossing a section of Condamine, then following the boundary between Pine Hills and Condamine, and finally reaching an intersection with the Leichhardt Highway in the town of Condamine, where it ends.

The road is fully sealed. A project to widen and strengthen sections of this road was completed in February 2022. A project to replace a timber bridge with a two-lane concrete bridge was completed in October 2021.

Some 32 kilometres (20 mi) of the road were in a deteriorating condition as at May 2023, having about a 2 metres (6.6 ft) wide bitumen strip with rough edges. A petition to have this problem rectified was presented to the Queensland Parliament on 3 April 2023.

== Wallumbilla South Road ==
Wallumbilla South Road
- Location: Warrego Highway, Wallumbilla to Roma–Condamine Road, Wallumbilla South
- Length: 38.8 km (24.1 mi)

Wallumbilla South Road is a state-controlled district road (number 3441) rated as a local road of regional significance (LRRS). It runs 38.8 kilometres (24.1 mi) from the Warrego Highway in Wallumbilla to Roma–Condamine Road at the Wallumbilla South / Noorindoo midpoint. This road has no major intersections.

== History ==
Mount Abundance pastoral run was taken up in 1847, then abandoned but not relinquished in 1849 due to constant conflicts with local indigenous people. In 1856 it was sold and the new owner took up residence, considered to be the first European settler in the Roma district. Roma was established prior to 1863 when Queensland's first vine cuttings were planted. Brucedale pastoral station was established south-east of Roma, in what is now Tingun, prior to 1866.

In Tingun, Yalebone Station was established prior to 1885.
Wallumbilla South was the name of a pastoral run established in the 1860s.
Noorindoo was the name of a pastoral run established before 1858.
Warkon is the name of a pastoral run established in 1850. It was offered for sale in 2019 after 93 years of ownership by the one family.
Moraby was the name of a property established by 1860 and held in the one family for the following 148 years. In 1866 a hotel was opened in Moraby to cater for travellers on the road.

The town that is now Condamine was surveyed in 1859. It became a stopping place for bullock and horse teams on their way to the larger centres of Roma and Longreach.

In June 1938 the Condamine Highway (Roma–Condamine Road) was "nearly complete". This was before the road that is now the Warrego Highway was built, the reason being that soil conditions would make a road following the railway line to Roma a much more expensive undertaking.

== Major intersections ==
All distances are from Google Maps.

| LGA | Location | km | mi | Destinations | Notes |
|---|---|---|---|---|---|
| Maranoa | Tingun | 0 | 0.0 | Carnarvon Highway – north-west – Roma: south-east - Surat | Western end of Roma–Condamine Road. Road continues south-east by east as Condamine Highway. |
| Maranoa | Wallumbilla South / Noorindoo midpoint | 10.3 | 6.4 | Wallumbilla South Road – north-east – Wallumbilla South, Wallumbilla, Warrego Highway | Road continues south-east. |
| Maranoa | Warkon | 25.6 | 15.9 | Yuleba–Surat Road – south-west – Noorindoo, Carnarvon Highway, Surat | Western concurrency terminus with Yuleba–Surat Road. Road continues north-east. |
| Maranoa | Warkon | 27.6 | 17.1 | Yuleba–Surat Road – north-east – Yuleba, Warrego Highway | Eastern concurrency terminus with Yuleba–Surat Road. Road continues north-east, then east. |
| Western Downs | Moraby | 80.2 | 49.8 | Dulacca South Road – north-west – Dulacca, Warrego Highway | Road continues east. |
| Western Downs | Condamine | 115 | 71 | Leichhardt Highway – north – Miles – south – The Gums, Moonie, Goondiwindi. | Eastern end of Roma–Condamine Road. |
1.000 mi = 1.609 km; 1.000 km = 0.621 mi: Concurrency terminus

== See also ==
- List of numbered roads in Queensland
