= Nostalgic Queen's Theatre =

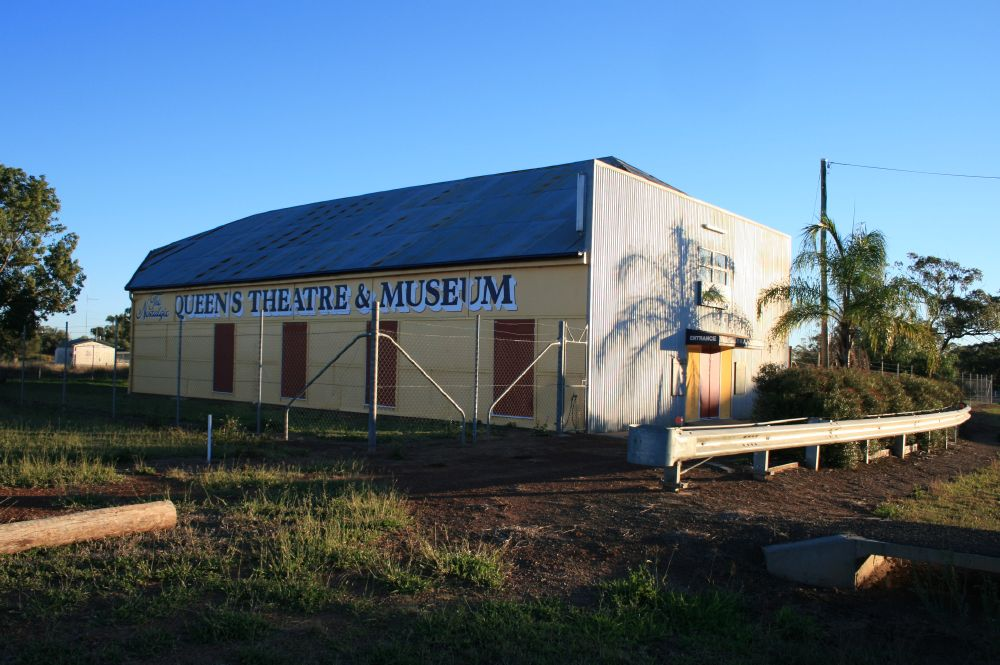
- Nostalgic Queen's Theatre, 2008

- Location within Queensland Location within Australia
- 26.5869°S 149.1865°E
- Location: George Street, Wallumbilla, Maranoa Region, Queensland, Australia

History
- Design period: 1919 - 1930s (interwar period)
- Built: 1939

Queensland Heritage Register
- Official name: Nostalgic Queen's Theatre, Queen's Theatre
- Type: state heritage (built)
- Designated: 25 October 2002
- Reference no.: 602378
- Significant period: 1939 (fabric); 1939-1975, 1981, 1988, 1993, 1994- ongoing ( social)
- Significant components: auditorium
- Builders: F & P Giles

Nostalgic Queen's Theatre is a heritage-listed cinema at George Street, Wallumbilla, Maranoa Region, Queensland, Australia. It was built in 1939 by F & P Giles. It is also known as Queen's Theatre. It was added to the Queensland Heritage Register on 25 October 2002.

== History ==
The Nostalgic Queen's Theatre is a modest purpose-built picture theatre built in 1939 in the town of Wallumbilla, 40 kilometres (25 mi) east of Roma.

Wallumbilla was the largest of three small service towns in the Shire of Bendemere (since 2008 amalgamated into the Maranoa Region), whose economy is based on primary production including cattle, grain and timber and on the natural gas industry. Europeans first settled the district in 1854 when Wallumbilla pastoral run was taken up. The township developed as a service town with the coming of the Western railway in 1880.

In the 1900s films were brought to Wallumbilla by a traveling projectionist and shown in Bishop's Hall using a hand-cranked projector. At an unknown date the local shopkeeper, Eddie Murphy, purchased the hall and relocated it to the site of the current news agency. He renamed it Murphy's Hall and used it as a picture theatre showing silent films accompanied by piano.

The Lumiere Brothers had produced the first moving films in Paris in 1895, followed by Edison Studios in America in 1896, although these early films were very short and simply captured events without a narrative. The first feature movie "The Story of the Kelly Gang" was made in Australia in 1906 and it was the ability of film to tell a story that was the key to its popularity. At first, films were shown as part of variety shows in theatres or were screened in halls. In the 1900s purpose built picture theatres showing a program of films accompanied by music were built in America, Europe and Australia. Some of those catering to centres with large populations were huge and luxurious, though most were far more modest.

Films were much less expensive to show than live theatre and the equipment was easily transported, making them well suited as an entertainment in country areas, some films being displayed by "picture show men" such as the one who travelled to Wallumbilla. The growing popularity of films led to the construction of many open-air theatres or simple shed-like buildings as permanent venues for showing film. Although theatre chains usually owned the large "picture palaces" in cities, most small picture theatres in Queensland were independently owned and Queensland eventually had more independently owned theatres than any other state in Australia. These small ventures, frequently family owned, did not have the capital to build lavish premises, nor did they have a large client base in country areas and might screen films only once or twice a week. The Queen's Theatre at Wallumbilla is such a picture theatre.

In 1930, Les Cadsow, a baker, bought the Wallumbilla hall and continued to use it as a picture theatre, naming it the De Luxe. It was renamed the Liberty Theatre, presumably when the Second World War broke out, but burned down in 1939. Cadsow bought new projectors with the thought of starting again but could not afford to do so and so he sold the projectors to the Giles brothers from Miles who constructed a new purpose-built picture theatre in 1941. Frank and Paddy Giles were sawmillers and builders and also operated as Rex Touring Pictures. They showed films in Miles, Dulacca, Jackson, Yuleba and Wallumbilla over a weekly circuit. Wallumbilla had the Saturday night screening as it had the largest audience.

The Wallumbilla theatre was simple in form with a timber frame clad in fibrous cement sheeting held by timber battens. Laminated arches of cypress pine, which allowed good sightlines to the screen, supported the roof. Timber was also used for the floor and the walls, which were lined with Swedish hardboard for good acoustics, though the roof was unlined. Though simple, the picture theatre aspired to a touch of Hollywood glamour with Chinese lanterns over the lights and pictures of Warner Brothers and MGM stars on the walls.

A country picture theatre such as the Queen's provided an important service to people in the surrounding area. Coming into town for a night at the pictures provided good family entertainment, a venue for courtship and an opportunity for people of all ages to meet. Picture theatres showed feature films, newsreels, and cartoons and were often also used for live shows and special events. They provided a stimulus for the imagination and a relief from isolation, particularly in the difficult years of World War II. They were a link with the wider community in Australia and with contemporary American culture as presented by Hollywood. For all these reasons, picture going enjoyed widespread popularity throughout rural Queensland between the 1920s and the advent of competition from television.

In 1954 the Giles brothers sold the theatre to Hendrickas Johannes Payne and his wife Violet who ran it in conjunction with the Queen's Cafe across the road and hence the theatre became known as the Queen's Theatre. They upgraded the equipment and screened every Wednesday and Saturday night plus a Saturday matinee until 1962. In August 1962 Rodney and Shirley Houston leased the theatre from Payne. The sound system was modernized and new release movies were shown. To utilize the theatre when films were not being shown, roller-skating was introduced and proved very popular. In 1967 the Houstons bought the cinema and continued to show films even during the early 1970s when television began to displace going to the pictures as the most popular form of entertainment. The Queen's Theatre closed in 1975, but opened for 6 months over the summer of 1981. However, home videos then began to pose serious competition and the Queen's closed for 7 years.

It was kept in good repair, however, and in 1988 was able to screen The Man from Snowy River in celebration of Australia's Bicentennial year. Films were shown again in 1993 to celebrate the Wallumbilla School Centenary. Double features were then shown to full houses on two successive nights. This success encouraged the owners to reopen the theatre, renaming it the Nostalgic Queen's Theatre. The equipment was upgraded and a new wide screen installed. The theatre was also connected to mains electricity supply, instead of the generator that had previously provided electricity. The theatre opened again in January 1994 screening on one Saturday night a month during the summer. The Nostalgic Queen's Theatre is still used intermittently to screen films and hosted the Movie Muster, a festival of Australian films, during the Centenary of Federation celebrations in 2001.

The exterior cladding on the front of the building was replaced in the 1980s, when the confectionary counter opening onto the street on the right hand side of the entrance was sheeted over. The bottom panels of the fibrous cement sheeting on the side and rear walls has been renewed with equivalent modern sheeting. The interior of the building is still intact.

== Description ==
The Nostalgic Queen's Theatre is situated on the main highway through Wallumbilla.

It is a rectangular building with a timber frame. The roof is gabled and the main elevation has a plain rectangular facade clad in metal sheeting with a central doorway below a small window. The sides and rear of the building are clad in fibrous cement panels held in place by timber battens.

The interior forms a large rectangular auditorium with a ticket office to the right hand side of the entrance. Laminated timber arches support the roof and the level floor is timber. The walls are lined with vertical timber boards and hardboard sheeting.

Canvas layback seats at the rear of the theatre and canvas armchairs at the front provide seating for about 200. The building does not currently have toilets.

== Heritage listing ==
Nostalgic Queen's Theatre was listed on the Queensland Heritage Register on 25 October 2002 having satisfied the following criteria.

The place is important in demonstrating the evolution or pattern of Queensland's history.

The Nostalgic Queen's Theatre, Wallumbilla is important in demonstrating the development of picture theatres in Queensland and the part that picture going played in the life of Australia in the early and mid 20th century, before it began to be displaced by television. Picture theatres enjoyed widespread popularity, especially in rural areas, as they provided not only entertainment, but also a venue for social interaction and a means of reducing isolation by providing a window into the wider world. The Queen's Theatre is evidence for the popularity of picture going throughout rural Queensland in the mid 20th century.

The place demonstrates rare, uncommon or endangered aspects of Queensland's cultural heritage.

The Queen's Theatre is a purpose-built picture theatre that is still in use for its original purpose. It is now one of only a few early theatres remaining in Queensland that have not been adapted for other uses.

The place is important in demonstrating the principal characteristics of a particular class of cultural places.

It is a good example of the type of modest picture theatre once common in rural towns, being very simple in plan and having arches to support the roof to provide good sight lines.

The place has a strong or special association with a particular community or cultural group for social, cultural or spiritual reasons.

The Queen's Theatre has important associations with the community of Wallumbilla and the surrounding area, as a venue for social interaction and popular entertainment, and for many members of which it is a focus for memories.
