= Jackson North, Queensland =

Jackson North
- Suburb
- Interactive map of Jackson North
- Coordinates: 26.4611°S 149.6472°E
- Country: Australia
- State: Queensland
- LGA: Maranoa Region
- Location: 61.8 km (38.4 mi) SE of Wandoan; 64.3 km (40.0 mi) ENE of Wallumbilla; 76.6 km (47.6 mi) WNW of Miles; 105 km (65 mi) ENE of Roma; 413 km (257 mi) WNW of Brisbane

Government
  - State electorate: Warrego
  - Federal division: Maranoa

Area
  - Total: 646.7 km^{2} (249.7 sq mi)

Population
  - Total: 45 (2021 census)
  - Density: 0.0696/km^{2} (0.1802/sq mi)
- Time zone: UTC+10:00 (AEST)
- Postcode: 4426
Suburbs around Jackson North
Bundi	Bundi	Woleebee
Yuleba North	Jackson North	Bogandilla
Jackson South	Jackson	Dulacca

Jackson North is a rural locality in the Maranoa Region, Queensland, Australia. In the 2021 census, Jackson North had a population of 45 people.

== Geography ==
The Great Dividing Range enters the locality from the north-west (Bundi / Yuleba North) and exits to the north-east (Woleebee / Bogandilla). Unlike some parts of the range, the range in Jackson North is not defined by a chain of mountains, but rather by forming the drainage divide between the North-East Coast drainage basin (where rivers flow east into the Coral Sea) and the Murray-Darling Basin (where rivers flow south-west to the Southern Ocean).

The Warrego Highway enters from the east (Jackson), forms the southern boundary of the locality, and then exits to the west (Jackson South / Yuleba North). The Western railway line runs immediately parallel and south to the highway.

The Jackson Wandoan Road enters the location from the south (Jackson) and exits to the north-east (Woleebee).

The land use is grazing on native vegetation with a small amount of crop growing in the west of the locality.

== History ==
The locality takes its name from the town of Jackson to the south, which was named after John Woodward Wyndham Jackson who was a pioneer settler in the district.

Noonga Provisional School opened in 1916, as a half-time school in conjunction with Clarke's Creek Provisional School (meaning the two schools shared on teacher between them). The school closed in 1917, but reopened in 1918 as a half-time school in conjunction with Bogandilla Provisional School. In 1919 it was briefly a full-time school (not sharing its teacher) before reverting to a half-time school in conjunction with Noonga Creek Provisional School in August 1920. The school closed circa 1921. On 22 September 1947 a new Noonga State School opened. It closed at end of the school year in 1968. Noonga State School was located on the Noonga pastoral station west of the Jackson Wandoan Road and immediately west of Noonga Creek (26.4736°S 149.6340°E).

== Demographics ==
In the 2016 census, Jackson North had a population of 61 people.

In the 2021 census, Jackson North had a population of 45 people.

== Education ==
There are no schools in Jackson North. The nearest government primary schools are Dulacca State School in neighbouring Dulacca to the south-east, Yuleba State School in Yuleba to the south-west, and Guluguba State School in Guluguba to the north-east. The nearest government secondary schools are Wallumbilla State School (to Year 10) in Wallumbilla to the west and Wandoan State School (to Year 10) in Wandoan to the north-east. However, not all students in the locality would be within range of these schools for a daily commute. There are no schools offering education to Year 12 nearby. The alternatives are distance education and boarding school.
