= Yuleba South, Queensland =

Yuleba South
- Suburb
- Interactive map of Yuleba South
- Coordinates: 26.7269°S 149.3927°E
- Country: Australia
- State: Queensland
- LGA: Maranoa Region
- Location: 28.1 km (17.5 mi) SE of Wallumbilla; 68.3 km (42.4 mi) ESE of Roma; 301 km (187 mi) NW of Toowoomba; 427 km (265 mi) WNW of Brisbane

Government
  - State electorate: Warrego
  - Federal division: Maranoa

Area
  - Total: 364.6 km^{2} (140.8 sq mi)

Population
  - Total: 21 (2021 census)
  - Density: 0.0576/km^{2} (0.149/sq mi)
- Time zone: UTC+10:00 (AEST)
- Postcode: 4427
Suburbs around Yuleba South
Wallumbilla North	Yuleba	Yuleba North
Wallumbilla South	Yuleba South	Jackson South
Warkon	Warkon	Jackson South

Yuleba South is a rural locality in the Maranoa Region, Queensland, Australia. In the 2021 census, Yuleba South had a population of 21 people.

== Geography ==
The Warrego Highway and the Western railway line run immediately parallel along two sections of the northern boundary, entering initially from the north-east (Yuleba North / Jackson South) and then exiting to Yuleba and then re-entering and exiting to the north-west (Wallumbilla North / Wallumbilla South).

The Yuleba Surat Road enters the locality from the north (Yuleba) and travels south, forming part of the western boundary with Wallumbilla South, before exiting to the south (Warkon).

There are two sections of the Yuleba State Forest in the locality, one in the centre of the locality and the other in the north-east of the locality extending into neighbouring Jackson South and beyond. Apart from these protected areas, the land use is predominantly grazing on native vegetation with a small amount of crop growing.

== History ==
The locality takes its name from the town of Yuleba, which was a name given in 1865 to a settlement on Yuleba Creek, but which in October 1879 was moved to the railway crossing on Yuleba Creek.

== Demographics ==
In the 2016 census, Yuleba South had a population of 27 people.

In the 2021 census, Yuleba South had a population of 21 people.

== Education ==
There are no schools in Yuleba. The nearest government primary school is Yuleba State School in neighbouring Yuleba to the north. The nearest government secondary schools are Wallumbilla State School (to Year 10) in Wallumbilla to the north-west. The nearest government school offering secondary education to Year 12 is Roma State College in Roma to the west, but it would be too distant for most students in Yuleba South to attend; the alternatives are distance education and boarding school.
