= Jackson South, Queensland =

Jackson South
- Suburb
- Interactive map of Jackson South
- Coordinates: 26.7313°S 149.5722°E
- Country: Australia
- State: Queensland
- LGA: Maranoa Region
- Location: 53.1 km (33.0 mi) ESE of Wallumbilla; 93.3 km (58.0 mi) E of Roma; 275 km (171 mi) NW of Toowoomba; 411 km (255 mi) WNW of Brisbane

Government
  - State electorate: Warrego
  - Federal division: Maranoa

Area
  - Total: 321.2 km^{2} (124.0 sq mi)

Population
  - Total: 0 (2021 census)
  - Density: 0.0000/km^{2} (0.000/sq mi)
- Time zone: UTC+10:00 (AEST)
- Postcode: 4426
Suburbs around Jackson South
Yuleba	Yuleba North; Jackson North	Jackson
Yuleba South	Jackson South	Dulacca
Yuleba South	Warkon; Moraby	Dulacca

Jackson South is a rural locality in the Maranoa Region, Queensland, Australia. In the 2021 census, Jackson South had "no people or a very low population".

== Geography ==
Most of the locality is within the Yuleba State Forest, except the eastern part, where the land use is predominantly grazing on native vegetation with some crop growing.

The Warrego Highway enters the locality from the north-east (Jackson North / Jackson) forming the northern boundary of the locality, before exiting the locality to the north-west (Yuleba / Yuleba South).

The Western railway line runs immediately south and parallel to the highway. The locality was served by the now-abandoned Channing railway station (26.6241°S 149.5363°E).

== History ==
The locality takes its name from the neighbouring town of Jackson, which was named after John Woodward Wyndham Jackson who was a pioneer settler in the district.

== Demographics ==
In the 2016 census, Jackson South had a population of 10 people.

In the 2021 census, Jackson South had "no people or a very low population".

== Education ==
There are no schools in Jackson South. The nearest government primary schools are Dulacca State School in neighbouring Dulacca to the east and Yuleba State School in neighbouring Yuleba to the north-west. The nearest government secondary school is Wallumbilla State School (to Year 10) in Wallumbilla to the north-west. There is are no government secondary schools offering secondary schooling to Year 12 within range of a daily commute; the alternatives would be distance education and boarding school.
