= Mooga, Queensland =

Mooga
- Suburb
- Interactive map of Mooga
- Coordinates: 26.399016°S 149.026348°E
- Country: Australia
- State: Queensland
- LGA: Maranoa Region
- Location: 37.4 km (23.2 mi) NE of Roma; 43.4 km (27.0 mi) NW of Wallumbilla; 355 km (221 mi) WNW of Toowoomba; 482 km (300 mi) WNW of Brisbane

Government
  - State electorate: Warrego
  - Federal division: Maranoa

Area
  - Total: 169.4 km^{2} (65.4 sq mi)

Population
  - Total: 49 (2021 census)
  - Density: 0.2893/km^{2} (0.749/sq mi)
- Time zone: UTC+10:00 (AEST)
- Postcode: 4413
Suburbs around Mooga
Eumamurrin	Durham Downs	Durham Downs
Euthulla	Mooga	Pickanjinnie
Euthulla	Blythdale	Pickanjinnie

Mooga is a rural locality in the Maranoa Region, Queensland, Australia. In the 2021 census, Mooga had a population of 30 people.

== Geography ==
The Roma-Taroom Road forms part of the north-western boundary on the locality.

On the surface, the land use is predominantly grazing on native vegetation with small amounts of crop growing. Coal seam gas is extracted from beneath the surface throughout the locality.

== History ==
The name Mooga was derived from the pastoral run name, which was an Aboriginal word in the Mandandanji language, meaning kingfisher.

Mooga Provisional School opened on 1 August 1904. It was described in 1905 as having "practical, intelligent, and resourceful methods of teaching" making it "the best taught provisional school in the district". On 1 January 1909, it became Mooga State School. It closed on 18 April 1937. It was on the northern side of Mountainview Road, within the present-day locality of neighbouring Euthulla (26.36873°S 148.81698°E).

== Demographics ==
In the 2016 census, Mooga had a population of 17 people.

In the 2021 census, Mooga had a population of 30 people.

== Education ==
There are no schools in Mooga. The nearest government schools are Wallumbilla State School (Prep to Year 10) in Wallumbilla to the south-east and Roma State College (Prep to Year 12) in Roma to the south-west. Students in the north-east of Mooga may be too distant for a daily commute to Roma; the alternatives are distance education and boarding school.
