= Yuleba North, Queensland =

Yuleba North
- Suburb
- Interactive map of Yuleba North
- Coordinates: 26.4755°S 149.4666°E
- Country: Australia
- State: Queensland
- LGA: Maranoa Region
- Location: 26.9 km (16.7 mi) N of Yuleba; 46.5 km (28.9 mi) NE of Wallumbilla; 86.7 km (53.9 mi) ENE of Roma; 316 km (196 mi) NW of Toowoomba; 443 km (275 mi) WNW of Brisbane

Government
  - State electorate: Warrego
  - Federal division: Maranoa

Area
  - Total: 604.2 km^{2} (233.3 sq mi)

Population
  - Total: 26 (2021 census)
  - Density: 0.0430/km^{2} (0.1115/sq mi)
- Time zone: UTC+10:00 (AEST)
- Postcode: 4427
Suburbs around Yuleba North
Clifford	Bundi	Jackson North
Wallumbilla North	Yuleba North	Jackson North
Yuleba	Yuleba South	Jackson South

Yuleba North is a rural locality in the Maranoa Region, Queensland, Australia. In the 2021 census, Yuleba North had a population of 26 people.

== Geography ==
The Warrego Highway and Western railway line runs along the eastern part of the southern boundary.

The highest point in the locality is Mount Combabula (26.3284°S 149.4412°E) at 440 metres (1,440 ft) above sea level.

Combabula State Forest is in the north of the locality (26.3566°S 149.4677°E) extending into neighbouring Bundi to the north. Two sections of Yuleba State Forest are in the south and south-east of the locality, extending into neighbouring Yuleba South and Jackson South and beyond. Apart from these protected areas, the predominant land use is grazing on native vegetation with crop-growing in the east of the locality.

Below ground throughout most of the locality, coal seam gas is extracted by Australia Pacific LNG and Bronco Energy.

== History ==
The locality takes its name from the town of Yuleba. When it was named in 1865, it was a settlement on Yuleba Creek. However, in October 1879, it moved to the railway crossing on Yuleba Creek.

== Demographics ==
In the 2016 census, Yuleba North had a population of 62 people.

In the 2021 census, Yuleba North had a population of 26 people.

== Education ==
There are no schools in Yuleba North. The nearest government primary school is Yuleba State School in neighbouring Yuleba to the south-west. The nearest government secondary school is Wallumbilla State School (to Year 10) in Wallumbilla to the south-west. There is no nearby school offering secondary schooling to Year 12; the options are distance education and boarding school.
