= Clifford, Queensland =

Clifford
- Suburb
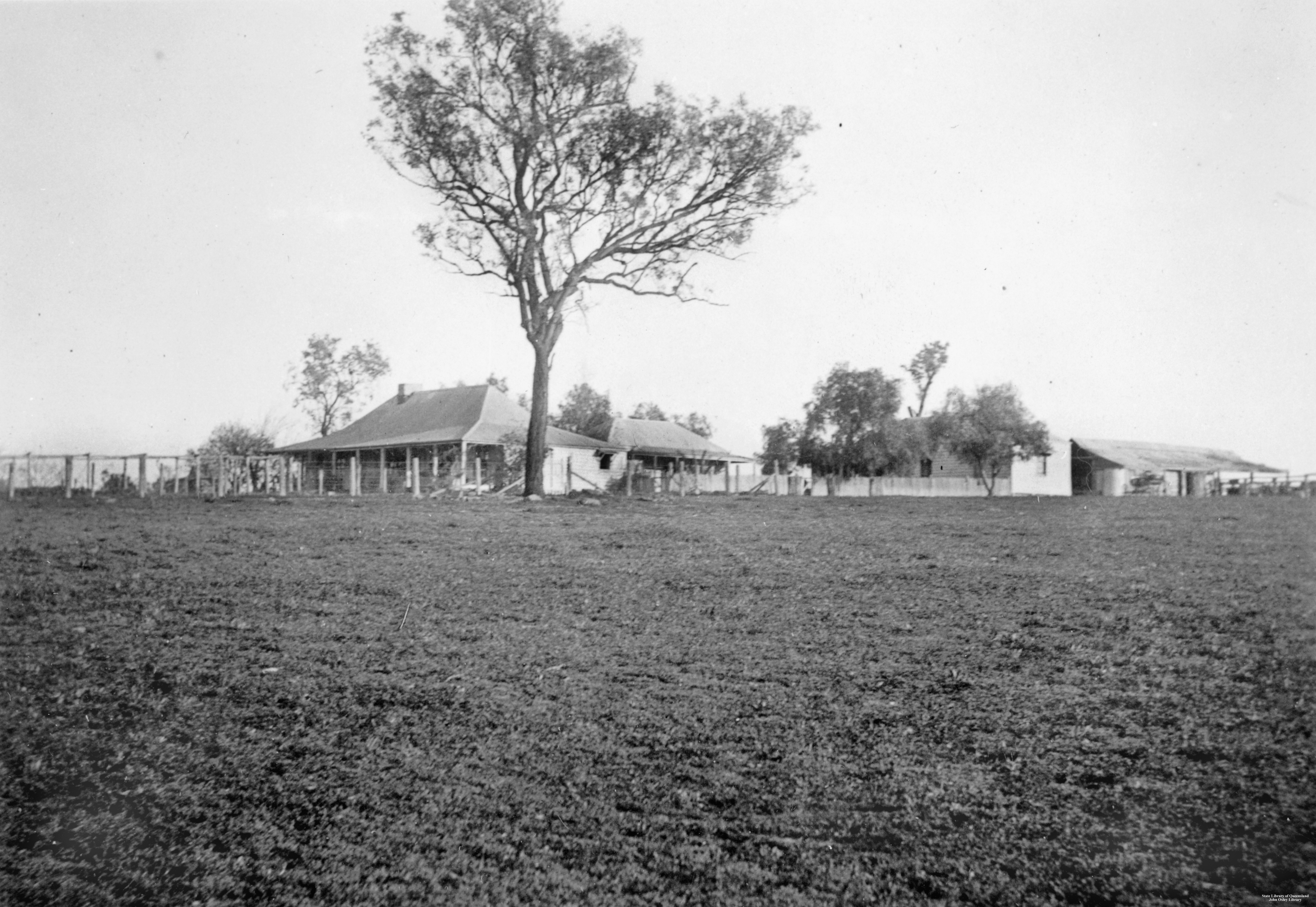
- Clifford Station, 1903

- Interactive map of Clifford
- Coordinates: 26.1402°S 149.3897°E
- Country: Australia
- State: Queensland
- LGA: Western Downs Region
- Location: 47.9 km (29.8 mi) NNE of Wallumbilla; 50.0 km (31.1 mi) NNW of Yuleba; 88.4 km (54.9 mi) NE of Roma; 339 km (211 mi) NW of Toowoomba; 465 km (289 mi) WNW of Brisbane

Government
  - State electorate: Callide
  - Federal division: Maranoa

Area
  - Total: 459.7 km^{2} (177.5 sq mi)

Population
  - Total: 29 (2021 census)
  - Density: 0.0631/km^{2} (0.1634/sq mi)
- Time zone: UTC+10:00 (AEST)
- Postcode: 4427
Suburbs around Clifford
Waikola	Eurombah	Bundi
Waikola	Clifford	Bundi
Wallumbilla North	Wallumbilla North	Yuleba North

Clifford is a rural locality in the Western Downs Region, Queensland, Australia. In the 2021 census, Clifford had a population of 29 people.

== Geography ==
The southern boundary of the locality loosely follows the Great Dividing Range with the locality being with the North East Coast drainage basin, specifically within the catchment of the Fitzroy River.

The Emu State Forest is in the south of the locality. Apart from this protected area, the land use is predominantly grazing on native vegetation with a small amount of crop growing.

== Demographics ==
In the 2016 census, Clifford had a population of 22 people.

In the 2021 census, Clifford had a population of 29 people.

== Education ==
There are no schools in Clifford. The nearest government primary schools are Grosmont State School in Grosmont to the north-east and Yuleba State School in Yuleba to the south. However, students in the centre of the locality would be too distant to attend these schools. The nearest government secondary school is Wallumbilla State School (to Year 10) in Wallumbilla to the south, but this school would be too distant for students in most parts of the locality. Also, there is no school offering education to Year 12 nearby. The alternatives are distance education and boarding school.
