= Pickanjinnie, Queensland =

Pickanjinnie
- Suburb
- Interactive map of Pickanjinnie
- Coordinates: 26.4416°S 149.1027°E
- Country: Australia
- State: Queensland
- LGA: Maranoa Region
- Location: 39.5 km (24.5 mi) E of Roma; 323 km (201 mi) WNW of Toowoomba; 451 km (280 mi) WNW of Brisbane

Government
  - State electorate: Warrego
  - Federal division: Maranoa

Area
  - Total: 174.4 km^{2} (67.3 sq mi)

Population
  - Total: 30 (2021 census)
  - Density: 0.172/km^{2} (0.45/sq mi)
- Time zone: UTC+10:00 (AEST)
- Postcode: 4428
Suburbs around Pickanjinnie
Mooga	Durham Downs	Waikola
Blythdale	Pickanjinnie	Wallumbilla North
Tingun	Wallumbilla South	Wallumbilla

Pickanjinnie is a rural locality in the Maranoa Region, Queensland, Australia. In the 2021 census, Pickanjinnie had a population of 30 people.

== Geography ==
Pickanjinnie railway station is an abandoned railway station on the Western railway line (26.5828°S 149.1156°E).

The Warrego Highway runs along the southern boundary.

== History ==
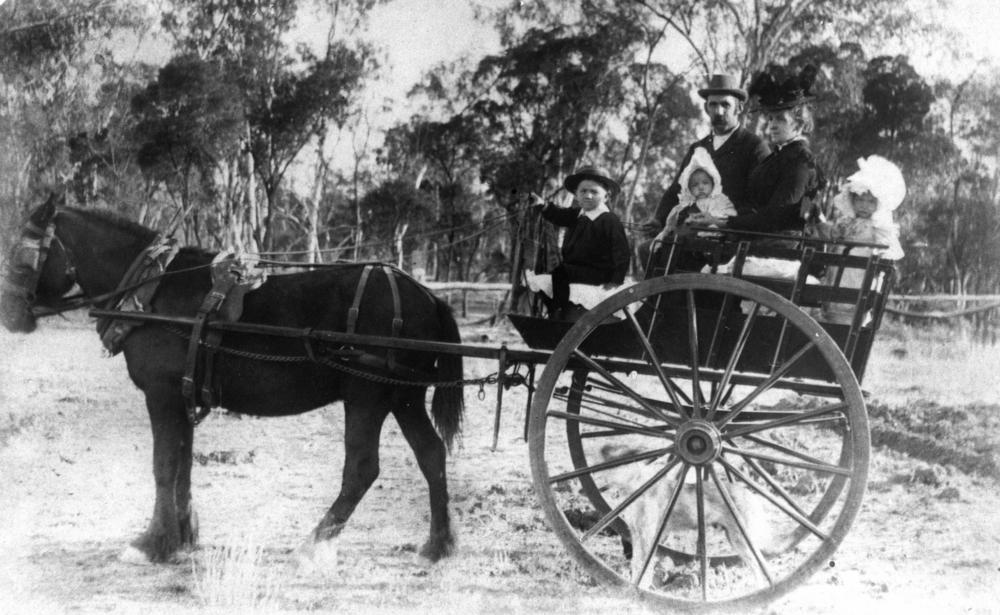
Bates Family at Pickanjinnie Creek Station, 1898

The locality's name is an Aboriginal word meaning place of land and water where the tortoise goes.

Poybah Provisional School opened circa in 1896. In 1901 it was renamed Pickenjennie Provisional School. On 1 January 1909 it became Pickenjennie State School. It closed circa 1926.

In December 1930, tenders were called to relocate the Pickenjinnie school building to Vale View.

== Demographics ==
In the 2016 census, Pickanjinnie had a population of 49 people.

In the 2021 census, Pickanjinnie had a population of 30 people.

== Education ==
There are no schools in Pickanjinnie. The nearest government primary school is Wallumbilla State School in neighbouring Wallumbilla to the south-east. The nearest government secondary schools are Wallumbilla State School (to Year 10) and Roma State College (to Year 12) in Roma to the west.
