= Orange Hill =

Orange Hill may refer to:

- Orange Hill, Queensland, Australia
- Orange Hill, Saint James, Barbados, a community in Saint James, Barbados
- Orange Hill, New Brunswick, a community in Saint John County, New Brunswick, Canada
- Orange Hill, Saint Vincent, a community in Charlotte Parish, Saint Vincent and the Grenadines
- Orange Hill, Tobago, a town in Trinidad and Tobago
- Orange Hills, California, United States
