= Blythdale, Queensland =

Blythdale
- Town
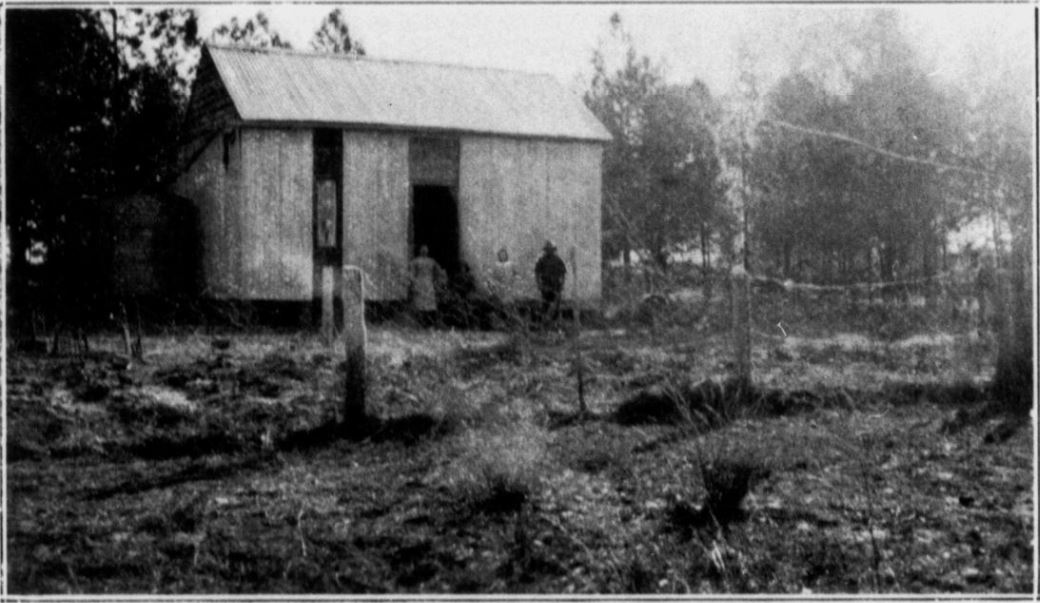
- Selector's house in Blythdale during the period of prickly pear infestation, circa 1925

- Interactive map of Blythdale
- Coordinates: 26.5794°S 148.9533°E
- Country: Australia
- State: Queensland
- LGA: Maranoa Region
- Location: 23.2 km (14.4 mi) W of Wallumbilla; 26.3 km (16.3 mi) E of Roma; 334 km (208 mi) WNW of Toowoomba; 460 km (290 mi) WNW of Brisbane

Government
  - State electorate: Warrego
  - Federal division: Maranoa

Area
  - Total: 129.8 km^{2} (50.1 sq mi)

Population
  - Total: 47 (2021 census locality)
  - Density: 0.362/km^{2} (0.938/sq mi)
- Time zone: UTC+10:00 (AEST)
- Postcode: 4455
Localities around Blythdale
Euthulla	Mooga	Pickanjinnie
Euthulla	Blythdale	Pickanjinnie
Tingun	Tingun	Pickanjinnie

Blythdale is a rural town and locality in the Maranoa Region, Queensland, Australia. In the 2021 census, the locality of Blythdale had a population of 47 people.

== Geography ==
The locality is bounded to the south by the Western railway line with the undeveloped town served by Blythdale railway station (26.5814°S 148.9546°E).

The Warrego Highway runs immediately north and parallel to the railway line.

The railway and highway enter the locality from the east (Pickanjinnie) and exit to the west (Euthulla).

The land use is predominantly grazing on native vegetation with a small amount of crop growing.

== History ==
In 1848, James Alexander Blyth(e) tried to establish a pastoral run called "Tingun Station" on Tingun Creek, 12 miles (19 km) west of Roma. During an attack by Aboriginals near the creek, Blythe was thrown from his horse and speared in the leg. He managed to escape and recovered from his wounds, but the attack caused him to give up the pastoral run. It was then taken up by W.P. Gordon and incorporated into his Wallumbilla pastoral run. Some years later John Christian (of the Hunter River District) purchased Tingun Station and installed his nephew Henry Cardell as his manager and partner. Cardell renamed the pastoral run Blythdale and the creek Blyth Creek in honour of Blythe.

== Demographics ==
In the 2016 census, the locality of Blythdale had a population of 39 people.

In the 2021 census, the locality of Blythdale had a population of 47 people.

== Education ==
There are no schools in Blythdale. The nearest government primary schools are Roma State College in Roma to the west and Wallumbilla State School in Wallumbilla to the east. The nearest government secondary schools are Roma State College (to Year 12) and Wallumbilla State School (to Year 10). There is also a Catholic primary-and secondary-school in Roma.
