= Wallumbilla North, Queensland =

Wallumbilla North
- Suburb
- Interactive map of Wallumbilla North
- Coordinates: 26.4336°S 149.2491°E
- Country: Australia
- State: Queensland
- LGA: Maranoa Region
- Location: 23.7 km (14.7 mi) NNE of Wallumbilla; 64.3 km (40.0 mi) NE of Roma; 322 km (200 mi) NW of Toowoomba; 450 km (280 mi) NW of Brisbane

Government
  - State electorates: Warrego; Callide
  - Federal division: Maranoa

Area
  - Total: 741.6 km^{2} (286.3 sq mi)
- Elevation: 470 m (1,540 ft)

Population
  - Total: 158 (2021 census)
  - Density: 0.2131/km^{2} (0.5518/sq mi)
- Time zone: UTC+10:00 (AEST)
- Postcode: 4428
Suburbs around Wallumbilla North
Pickanjinnie	Waikola	Clifford
Pickanjinnie	Wallumbilla North	Yuleba North
Wallumbilla	Wallumbilla South	Yuleba; Yuleba South

Wallumbilla North is a rural locality in the Maranoa Region, Queensland, Australia. In the 2021 census, Wallumbilla North had a population of 158 people.

== Geography ==
As the name suggests, Wallumbilla North is immediately north of Wallumbilla.

Wallumbilla Creek, Middle Creek and Cattle Creek rise in the locality. All are eventually tributaries of the Balonne River.

The Western railway line forms part of the southern boundary of the locality with the Warrego Highway running immediately parallel to the north of the railway line.

The land use is predominantly grazing on native vegetation with some crop growing.

== History ==
The name Wallumbilla was the name of a pastoral run leased by Charles Coxen, The name is presumed to come from the indigenous Mandandanji language and reportedly means wallu=plenty and billa=jew fish.

The Western railway line from Yuleba to Blythdale opened on 12 January 1880, with the locality being served by the now-abandoned Armoo railway station (26.6011°S 149.3242°E).

Chadford Provisional School opened on 9 March 1908 as a half-time school in conjunction with Stake Yard Provisional School (meaning the two schools shared a single teacher). Circa September 1908, Chadford Provisional School become a full-time school (having its own teacher). It closed in 1909 to reopen on 24 August 1910 as Chadford State School. It closed on 24 August 1962. It was at 75 Old Chadford Road (26.4919°S 149.2419°E).

North Wallumbilla Creek State School opened in 1911 but was renamed Rasley State School in 1912 and then Raslie State State on 1 April 1913. It closed on 28 January 1963. It was on Raslie Road (26.4805°S 149.1268°E).

== Demographics ==
In the 2016 census, Wallumbilla North had a population of 147 people.

In the 2021 census, Wallumbilla North had a population of 158 people.

== Education ==
There are no schools in Wallumbilla North. The nearest government primary schools are Wallumbilla State School in neighbouring Wallumbilla to the south-west and Yuleba State School in neighbouring Yuleba to the south-east. The nearest government secondary schools are Wallumbilla State School (to Year 10 only) in neighbouring Wallumbilla to the south-west and Roma State College (to Year 12) in Roma to the west. However, given the distance to Roma, the alternatives are distance education and boarding school.
