= Tingun =

- Suburb
- Interactive map of Tingun
- Coordinates: 26.7666°S 148.9083°E
- Country: Australia
- State: Queensland
- LGA: Maranoa Region
- Location: 31.0 km (19.3 mi) SSE of Roma; 339 km (211 mi) WNW of Toowoomba; 467 km (290 mi) WNW of Brisbane

Government
  - State electorate: Warrego
  - Federal division: Maranoa

Area
  - Total: 1,241.1 km^{2} (479.2 sq mi)

Population
  - Total: 184 (2021 census)
  - Density: 0.1483/km^{2} (0.3840/sq mi)
- Time zone: UTC+10:00 (AEST)
- Postcode: 4455
Suburbs around Tingun
Roma; Bungil	Euthulla; Blythdale	Pickanjinnie
Mount Abundance	Tingun	Wallumbilla South
Ballaroo	Oberina	Noorindoo

Tingun is a rural locality in the Maranoa Region, Queensland, Australia. In the 2021 census, Tingun had a population of 184 people.

== Geography ==
The Western railway line forms the northern boundary of the locality.

The Warrego Highway runs along the northern boundary, the Carnarvon Highway runs through from north-west to south-east, and the Roma-Condamine Road exits to the south-east.

There are many state forests in the area including Trinidad, Brucedale, Tinowon, and Yalebone.

== History ==
Yalebone Station was for sale in May 1885, given as 43 square miles (110 km^{2}) of good forest country, and 9 miles (14 km) Yalebone Creek frontage, currently carrying 700 head of cattle.

Yalebone Provisional School opened 17 July 1911. It closed circa September 1925. It was on Yalebone Creek Road in the south-west of present-day Tingun (approx 26.86862°S 148.76262°E).

The Trenhed branch of the Western Division of the Queensland Country Women's Association operated in the area between at least 1938 and 1951.

== Demographics ==
In the 2016 census, Tingun had a population of 157 people.

In the 2021 census, Tingun had a population of 184 people.

== Education ==
There are no schools in Tingun. The nearest government primary schools are Roma State College in neighbouring Roma to the north-west, Wallumbilla State School in Wallumbilla to the north-east, and Surat State School in Surat to the south-east. The nearest government secondary schools are Roma State College (to Year 12) in Roma and Wallumbilla State School (to Year 10) in Wallumbilla.
