= Wallumbilla South, Queensland =

Wallumbilla South
- Suburb
- Interactive map of Wallumbilla South
- Coordinates: 26.7458°S 149.1855°E
- Country: Australia
- State: Queensland
- LGA: Maranoa Region
- Location: 13.0 km (8.1 mi) S of Wallumbilla; 53.2 km (33.1 mi) ESE of Roma; 323 km (201 mi) WNW of Toowoomba; 451 km (280 mi) WNW of Brisbane

Government
  - State electorate: Warrego
  - Federal division: Maranoa

Area
  - Total: 775.4 km^{2} (299.4 sq mi)

Population
  - Total: 80 (2021 census)
  - Density: 0.103/km^{2} (0.267/sq mi)
- Time zone: UTC+10:00 (AEST)
- Postcode: 4428
Suburbs around Wallumbilla South
Pickanjinnie	Wallumbilla	Wallumbilla North
Tingun	Wallumbilla South	Yuleba South
Tingun	Noorindoo	Warkon

Wallumbilla South is a rural locality in the Maranoa Region, Queensland, Australia. In the 2021 census, Wallumbilla South had a population of 80 people.

== Geography ==
As the name suggests, the locality is immediately south of the town of Wallumbilla. The Warrego Highway and Western railway line form part of the northern boundary of the locality.

The Roma-Condamine Road runs through the south-west corner.

There are four areas of state forest in the south-east of the locality: Wallabella State Forests 1 and 2, Tinowan State Forest, and Yalebone State Forest 1. Apart from these protected areas, the land use is a mixture of crop growing and grazing on native vegetion.

== History ==
The locality name is derived from town and parish, which in turn was a pastoral run name leased by naturalist Charles Coxen in the 1860s. The name is presumed to be from the Mandandanji language, wallu meaning plenty and billa meaning jew fish (possibly Argyrosomus japonicus).

== Demographics ==
In the 2016 census, Wallumbilla South had a population of 62 people.

In the 2021 census, Wallumbilla South had a population of 80 people.

== Education ==
There are no schools in Wallumbilla South. The nearest government primary schools are Wallumbilla State School in neighbouring Wallumbilla to the north and Yuleba State School in Yuleba to the north-east. The nearest government secondary schools are Wallumbilla State School (to Year 10) and Roma State College (to Year 12) in Roma to the north-west. Some parts of Wallumbilla might be too distant for a daily commute to Roma; other options the alternatives would be distance education and boarding school.
