= Moraby, Queensland =

Moraby
- Suburb
- Interactive map of Moraby
- Coordinates: 26.8905°S 149.7411°E
- Country: Australia
- State: Queensland
- LGA: Western Downs Region
- Location: 77.2 km (48.0 mi) SW of Miles; 170 km (110 mi) WNW of Dalby; 253 km (157 mi) NNW of Toowoomba; 383 km (238 mi) NNW of Brisbane

Government
  - State electorate: Warrego
  - Federal division: Maranoa

Area
  - Total: 491.1 km^{2} (189.6 sq mi)

Population
  - Total: 43 (2021 census)
  - Density: 0.0876/km^{2} (0.2268/sq mi)
- Time zone: UTC+10:00 (AEST)
- Postcode: 4416
Suburbs around Moraby
Jackson South	Dulacca	Drillham South
Warkon	Moraby	Pine Hills
Warkon	Yulabilla	Yulabilla

Moraby is a rural locality in the Western Downs Region, Queensland, Australia. In the 2021 census, Moraby had a population of 43 people.

== Geography ==
Roma–Condamine Road enters the locality from the west (Warkon) and exits to the east (Pine Hills).

The Yuleba State Forest extends from the south of the locality to the north-west of the locality and beyond into the neighbouring locality of Jackson South.

Apart from the state forest, the land use is a mixture of crop growing and grazing on native vegetation.

== History ==
The locality was officially named and bounded on 25 February 2000.

== Demographics ==
In the 2016 census, Moraby had a population of 42 people.

In the 2021 census, Moraby had a population of 43 people.

== Education ==
There are no schools in Moraby. The nearest government primary schools are Dulacca State School in neighbouring Dulacca to the north, Condamine State School in Condamine to the west, and Glenmorgan State School in Glenmorgan to the south. The nearest government secondary school is Miles State High School in Miles to the north-east; however, some parts of Moraby would be too distant for a daily commute and the alternatives would be distance education and boarding school.
