= Bogandilla, Queensland =

Bogandilla
- Suburb
- Interactive map of Bogandilla
- Coordinates: 26.4830°S 149.7702°E
- Country: Australia
- State: Queensland
- LGA: Western Downs Region
- Location: 61.2 km (38.0 mi) NW of Miles; 69.1 km (42.9 mi) SW of Wandoan; 188 km (117 mi) WNW of Dalby; 398 km (247 mi) WNW of Brisbane

Government
  - State electorates: Callide; Warrego
  - Federal division: Maranoa

Area
  - Total: 238.5 km^{2} (92.1 sq mi)

Population
  - Total: 37 (2021 census)
  - Density: 0.1551/km^{2} (0.402/sq mi)
- Time zone: UTC+10:00 (AEST)
- Postcode: 4425
Suburbs around Bogandilla
Jackson North	Jackson North	Woleebee
Jackson North	Bogandilla	Glenaubyn
Jackson North	Dulacca	Drillham

Bogandilla is a rural locality in the Western Downs Region, Queensland, Australia. In the 2021 census, Bogandilla had a population of 37 people.

== Geography ==
The Great Dividing Range loosely forms the northern boundary of the locality. Being south of the range, Bogandilla is part of the Murray-Darling basin via the Balonne and Condamine Rivers.

Dulacca North Road connects the locality to Dulacca to south and from there to the Warrego Highway.

The land use is grazing on native vegetation with some crop growing.

== History ==
Bogandilla Provisional School opened circa July 1918 as a half-time school (a teacher shared their time between 2 schools) with Noonga Provisional School (in present day Jackson North), but became a full-time provisional school in 1919. It was closed in 1927 due to low student numbers.

North Dulacca Hall was officially opened on Friday 23 May 1913 by Godfrey Morgan, the Member of the Queensland Legislative Assembly for Murilla. The hall has closed but the building is still extant (as at 2023). It was on North Dulacca Hall Road (26.44483°S 149.82196°E).

Dulacca North State School opened on 28 January 1919. It closed in 1936, but reopened in 1941. It closed permanently in 1953. It was on the south-west corner of Dulacca North Road (previously North Dulacca School Road) and Frizzells Road (26.45424°S 149.79963°E).

== Demographics ==
In the 2016 census, Bogandilla had a population of 28 people.

In the 2021 census, Bogandilla had a population of 37 people.

== Education ==
There are no schools in Bogandilla. The nearest government primary school is Dulacca State School in neighbouring Dulacca to the south. The nearest government secondary schools are Wandoan State School (to Year 10) in Wandoan to the north-east and Miles State High School (to Year 12) in Miles to the south-west.
