= Euthulla, Queensland =

Euthulla
- Suburb
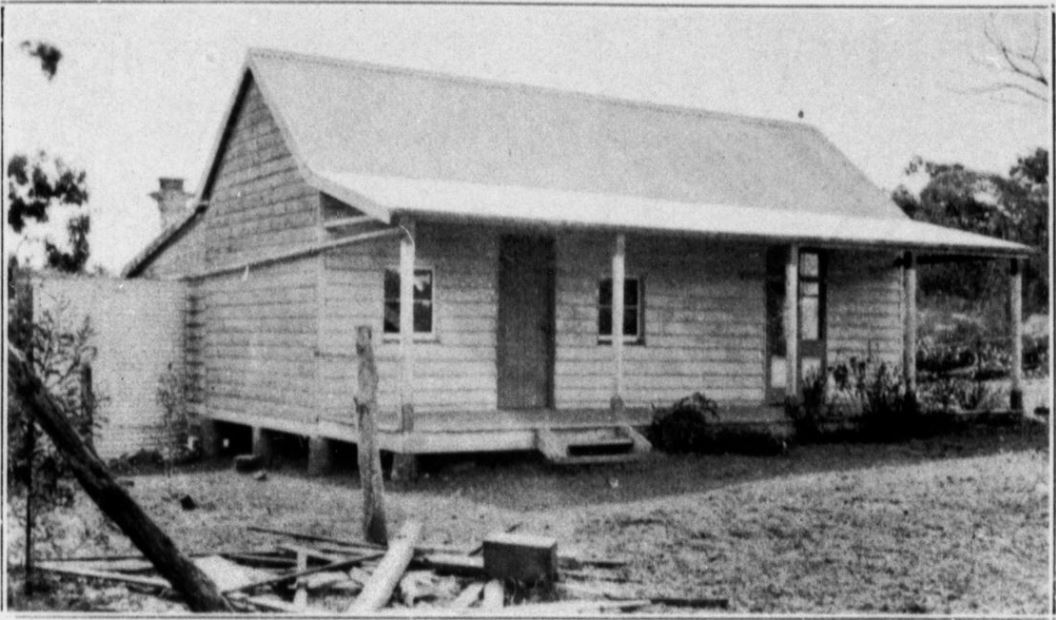
- Yingerbay State School, circa 1925

- Interactive map of Euthulla
- Coordinates: 26.4255°S 148.855°E
- Country: Australia
- State: Queensland
- LGA: Maranoa Region
- Location: 8.0 km (5.0 mi) NNW of Roma; 90.4 km (56.2 mi) S of Injune; 359 km (223 mi) WNW of Toowoomba; 538 km (334 mi) WNW of Brisbane

Government
  - State electorate: Warrego
  - Federal division: Maranoa

Area
  - Total: 670.9 km^{2} (259.0 sq mi)

Population
  - Total: 364 (2021 census)
  - Density: 0.5426/km^{2} (1.4052/sq mi)
- Time zone: UTC+10:00 (AEST)
- Postcode: 4455
Suburbs around Euthulla
Orallo	Eumamurrin	Mooga
Bungeworgorai	Euthulla	Blythdale
Dargal Road	Orange Hill; Roma	Tingun

Euthulla is a rural locality in the Maranoa Region, Queensland, Australia. In the 2021 census, Euthulla had a population of 364 people.

== Geography ==
The locality is loosely bounded by Bungeworgorai Creek to the west.

The Carnarvon Highway enters the locality from the south (Orange Hill) and exits to the north (Eumamurrin), and the Roma-Taroom Road exits to the north-east.

Grafton Range is in the east of the locality (26.3825°S 148.9442°E) with Mount Bassett (26.4788°S 148.8794°E) rising to 496 metres (1,627 ft) above sea level.

There are a number of neighbourhoods within the locality, which take their names from railway sidings on the now-closed Roma-to-Injune railway line which ran through the west of the location along the now Oralla Road. From Roma heading north, the neighbourhoods / stations were:

- Tineen (26.5166°S 148.7333°E)
- Minka (26.5°S 148.7°E)
- Euthulla (26.4791°S 148.6824°E)
- Nullawurt (26.4666°S 148.6666°E)
- Yingerbay (26.45°S 148.65°E)

There is another neighbourhood in the centre of the locality (not associated with the railway): Tabers (26.4°S 148.7833°E)

The land use is predominantly grazing on native vegetation with some cropping. Most of the residential areas are just outside the boundaries of Roma.

== History ==
Euthulla Provisional School opened circa 1889. On 1 January 1909, it became Euthulla State School. It closed circa 1921 but reopened in 1927. It closed finally circa 1931. The school was on the western side of Emoh Ruo Road (26.43077°S 148.77560°E).

Yingerbay Provisional School opened on 27 May 1895 under teacher Miss Elizabeth Hinch. On 1 January 1909, it became Yingerbay State School. It closed in 1922, but reopened in 1934 before closing permanently in 1940.

Mooga Provisional School opened on 1 August 1904. On 1 January 1909, it became Mooga State School. It closed on 18 April 1937. It was on the northern side of Mountainview Road (then within Mooga) but now within Euthulla (26.36873°S 148.81698°E).

Fortune's Crossing State School opened on 3 June 1912 and closed in 1928. It was off Orallo Road, immediately east of Bungeworgorai Creek (26.42987°S 148.63562°E).

The locality takes its name Euthulla from the railway station name, given by Queensland Railways Department on 30 November 1916, supposedly an Aboriginal word, meaning unknown.

The neighbourhood Minka also takes it name from a railway station assigned by the Railways Department on 29 April 1915, and is an Aboriginal word referring to a species of tree.

The neighbourhood Nullawurt also takes its name from a railway station and is an Aboriginal word for an Acacia (wattle) species of tree. It was assigned from 11 November 1915, from a suggestion from the Orallo Farmers and Settlers Association.

The neighbourhood name Tineen also comes from a railway station name, assigned on 16 October 1926, being an Aboriginal word, meaning mosquito.

The neighbourhood Yingerbay is the name of a railway station assigned on 11 November 1915, and taken from a pastoral run established in 1854, from the Mandandanji language, meaning a place of freshwater crayfish (yabbie).

== Demographics ==
In the 2016 census, Euthulla had a population of 370 people.

In the 2021 census, Euthulla had a population of 364 people.

== Education ==
There are no schools in the locality. The nearest primary and secondary school is Roma State College in Roma to the south.
