= Orange Hill, Queensland =

Orange Hill
- Suburb
- Interactive map of Orange Hill
- Coordinates: 26.4913°S 148.79°E
- Country: Australia
- State: Queensland
- LGA: Maranoa Region
- Location: 8.7 km (5.4 mi) N of Roma; 359 km (223 mi) WNW of Toowoomba; 547 km (340 mi) WNW of Brisbane

Government
  - State electorate: Warrego
  - Federal division: Maranoa

Area
  - Total: 35.0 km^{2} (13.5 sq mi)

Population
  - Total: 179 (2021 census)
  - Density: 5.114/km^{2} (13.25/sq mi)
- Time zone: UTC+10:00 (AEST)
- Postcode: 4455
Suburbs around Orange Hill
Euthulla	Euthulla	Euthulla
Euthulla	Orange Hill	Euthulla
Euthulla	Roma	Euthulla

Orange Hill is a rural locality in the Maranoa Region, Queensland, Australia. In the 2021 census, Orange Hill had a population of 179 people.

== Geography ==
Bungil Creek forms the eastern boundary of the locality. The Carnarvon Highway passes through the locality from south to north. The predominant land use is for cattle grazing.

== History ==
In May 1888, local residents met with the intention to establish a school in the Northern Road area. Northern Road Provisional School was in operation by November 1891. It later become Northern Road State School. The school closed some time after November 1939. It was at 777 Carnarvon Highway (26.50648°S 148.78819°E). In 1951, the school building was to be relocated to Mount Abundance.

The locality was officially named and bounded on 20 July 2001.

== Demographics ==
In the 2016 census, Orange Hill had a population of 201 people.

In the 2021 census, Orange Hill had a population of 179 people.

== Education ==
There are no schools in Orange Hill. The nearest government primary and secondary school is Roma State College (Prep to Year 12) in neighbouring Roma to the south.
