= Jackson, Queensland =

Jackson
- Town
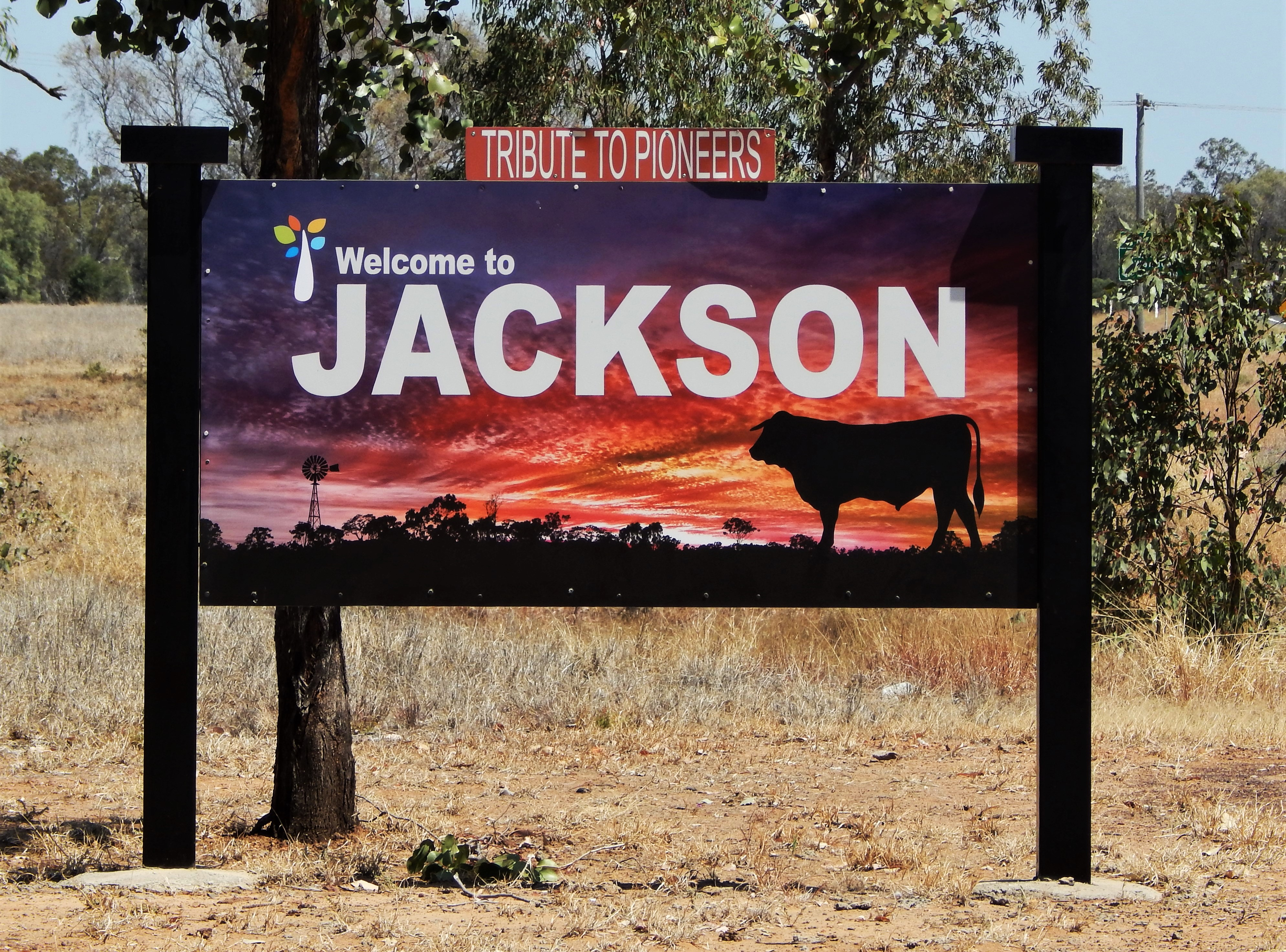
- Welcome to Jackson sign on Warrego Highway

- Interactive map of Jackson
- Coordinates: 26.6441°S 149.6225°E
- Country: Australia
- State: Queensland
- LGA: Maranoa Region
- Location: 57.4 km (35.7 mi) W of Miles; 85.1 km (52.9 mi) E of Roma; 267 km (166 mi) NW of Toowoomba; 395 km (245 mi) WNW of Brisbane
- Established: approx 1890

Government
  - State electorate: Warrego
  - Federal division: Maranoa

Area
  - Total: 89.7 km^{2} (34.6 sq mi)

Population
  - Total: 55 (2021 census)
  - Density: 0.613/km^{2} (1.588/sq mi)
- Time zone: UTC+10:00 (AEST)
- Postcode: 4426
Localities around Jackson
| Jackson North | Jackson North | Dulacca |
| Jackson South | Jackson | Dulacca |
| Jackson South | Jackson South | Dulacca |

Jackson is a rural town and locality in the Maranoa Region, Queensland, Australia. In the 2021 census, the locality of Jackson had a population of 55 people.

The town's economy was based on the rail industry.

== Geography ==
The Warrego Highway runs through from east to west.

The Western Railway Line also runs through from east to west, with the town historically served by the now-abandoned Jackson railway station (26.6432°S 149.6242°E).

== History ==
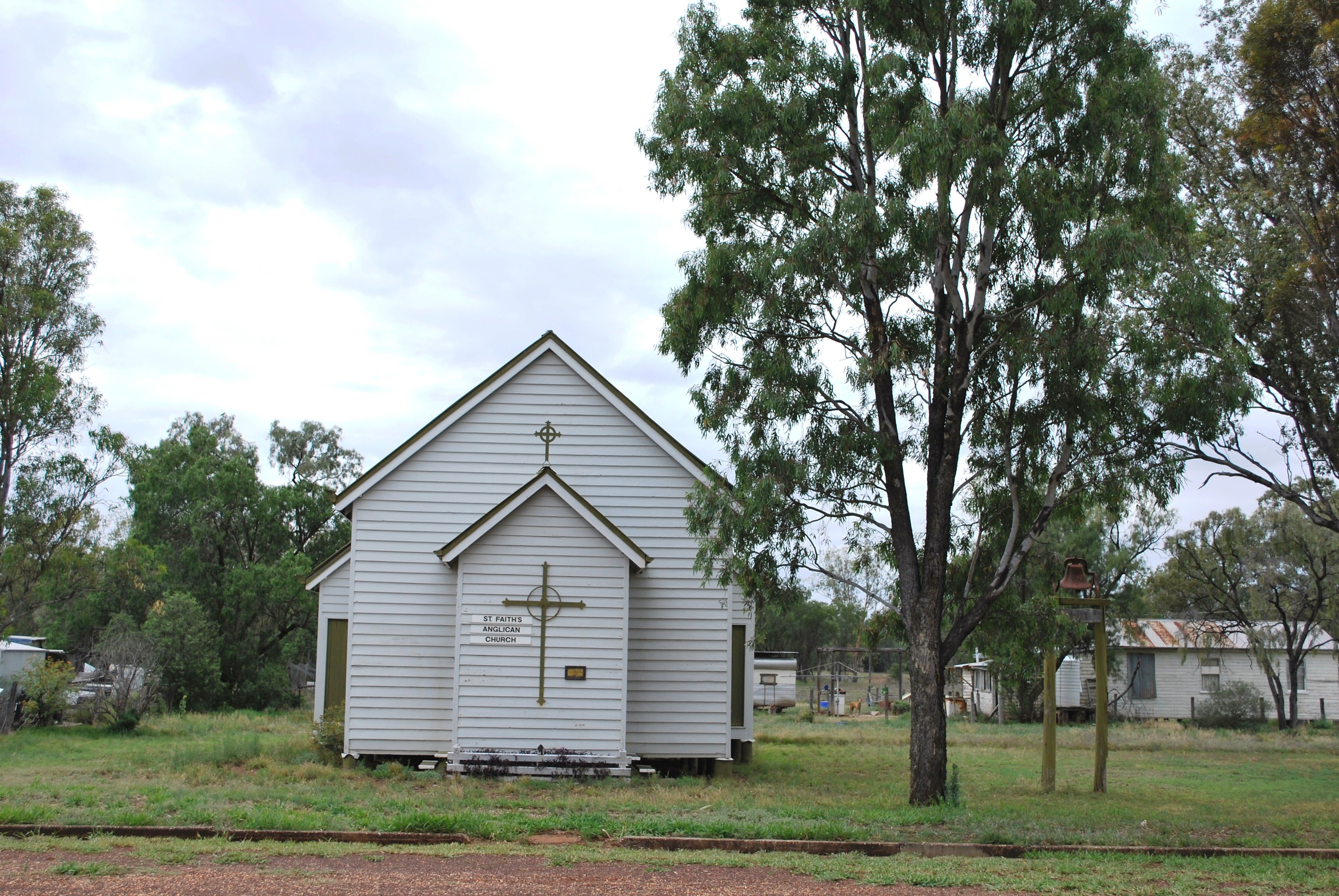
Former St Faith's Anglican church, 2008

The town is named after John Woodward Wyndham Jackson, who was a sawmiller at Channing (an area now within Jackson South) around 1887 and who later became the police magistrate at Mackay.

Jackson Post Office opened by July 1908 (a receiving office had been open from 1887) and closed in 1988.

Jackson Provisional School opened on 18 January 1892. On 1 January 1909, it became Jackson State School. It closed on 9 December 1983 after 91 years of service. It was at 23 Edward Street (26.6437°S 149.6279°E).

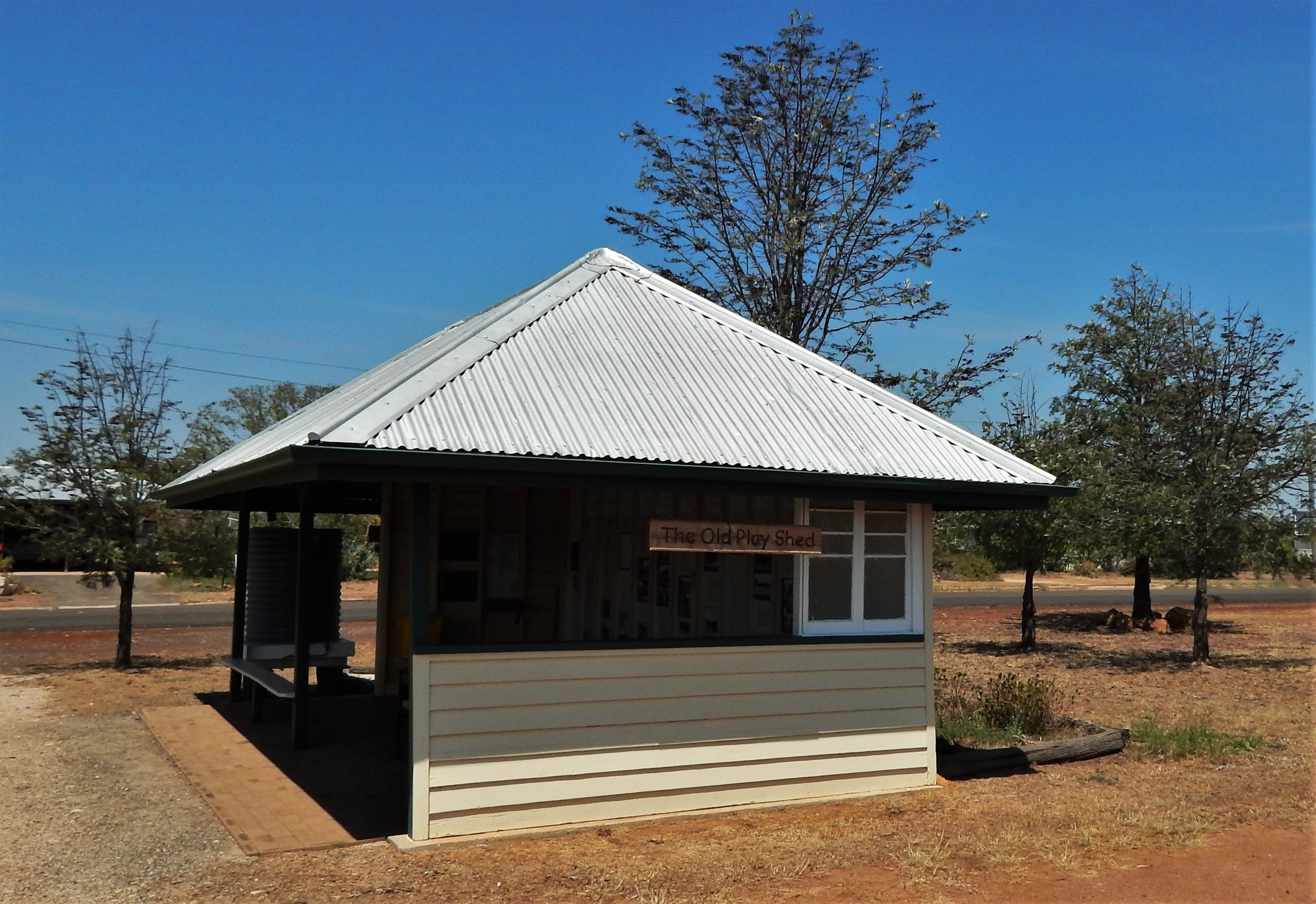
The Old Play Shed which houses Jackson's 'Tribute to Pioneers' display

In 2002, local resident Ella Robinson petitioned the former Bendemere Shire Council to have Jackson State School's play shed, built in 1908, relocated from the former school site (which had lain dormant since the School's closure in 1983) to the centre of town at the old railway station site to serve as a Intercity Bus Stop (ICBS) for passengers travelling on Greyhound Australia's long-distance coach services. In 2012, numerous information panels were installed in the old play shed illustrating the town's history and paying tribute to the pioneers who helped establish the rural community. A crowd of 120 attended a ceremony on 10 November 2012 to see then - Federal Member for Maranoa Bruce Scott officially unveil the new panels in what is now known as Jackson's "Tribute to Pioneers". Tourism bodies now mention The Old Play Shed in promotional material as one of the interesting sights to see in Jackson.

== Demographics ==
In the 2006 census, the locality of Jackson had a population of 171 people.

In the 2016 census, the locality of Jackson had a population of 57 people.

In the 2021 census, the locality of Jackson had a population of 55 people.

== Facilities ==
The Jackson Branch Library is situated in Edward Street. It is operated by the Maranoa Regional Council through the Rural Libraries Queensland service provided by the State Library of Queensland.

== Education ==
There are no schools in Jackson. The nearest government primary school is Dulacca State School in neighbouring Dulacca to the east. The nearest government secondary school is Wallumbilla State School (to Year 10) in Wallumbilla to the west. There are no local schools providing education to Year 12; the alternatives are distance education and boarding school.
