= Dulacca, Queensland =

Dulacca
- Town
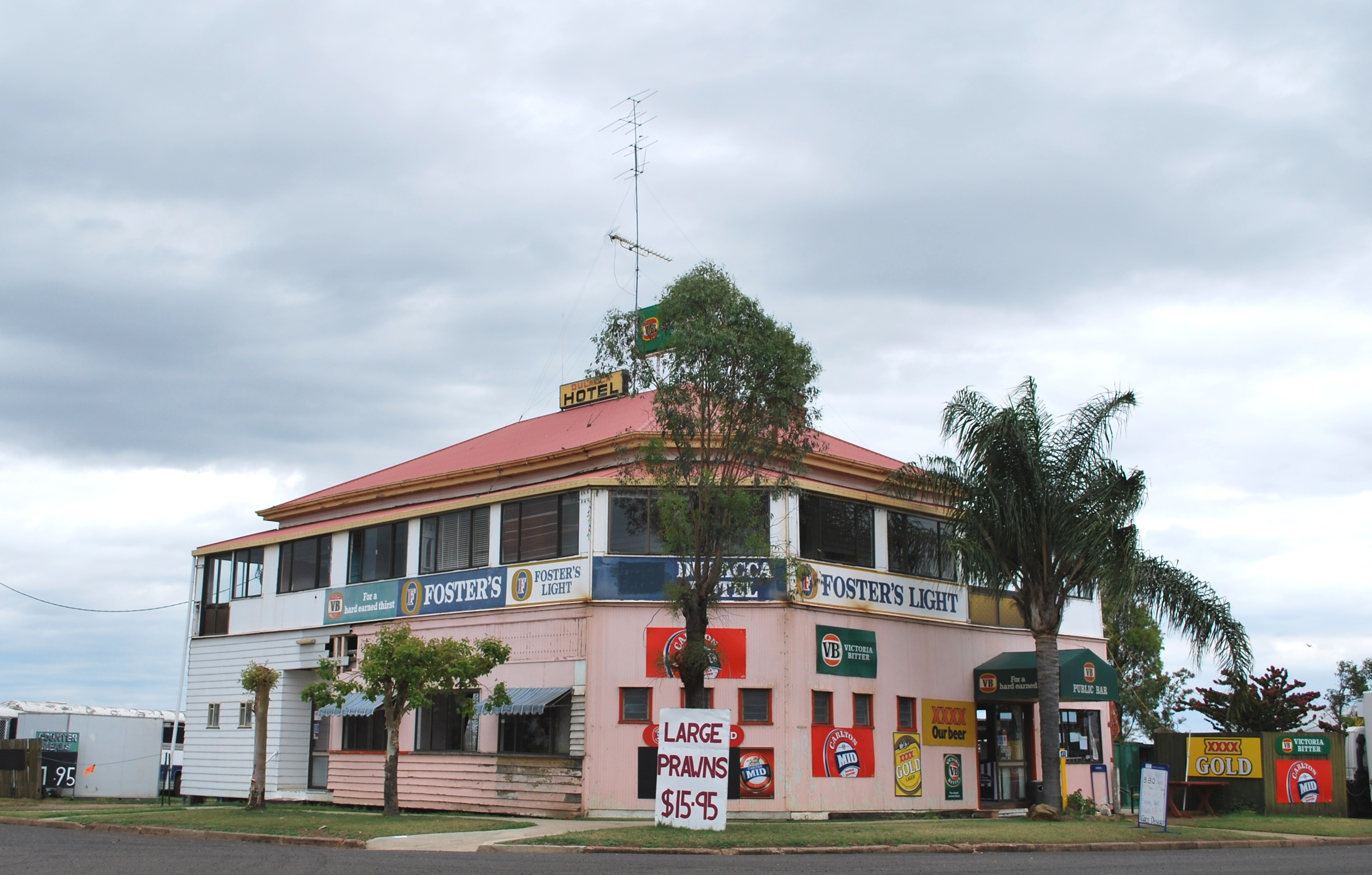
- Dulacca Hotel, a typical Queensland pub, but with the verandas walled in

- Interactive map of Dulacca
- Coordinates: 26.6419°S 149.7613°E
- Country: Australia
- State: Queensland
- LGA: Western Downs Region
- Location: 43 km (27 mi) W of Miles; 98 km (61 mi) E of Roma; 253 km (157 mi) NW of Toowoomba; 380 km (240 mi) NW of Brisbane

Government
  - State electorate: Warrego
  - Federal division: Maranoa

Area
  - Total: 438.6 km^{2} (169.3 sq mi)

Population
  - Total: 131 (2021 census)
  - Density: 0.2987/km^{2} (0.7736/sq mi)
- Time zone: UTC+10:00 (AEST)
- Postcode: 4425
Localities around Dulacca
| Jackson | Bogandilla | Drillham |
| Jackson South | Dulacca | Drillham |
| Moraby | Moraby | Drillham South |

Dulacca is a rural town and locality in the Western Downs Region, Queensland, Australia. In the 2021 census, the locality of Dulacca had a population of 131 people.

== Geography ==
Dulacca is on the Darling Downs, 380 kilometres (240 mi) north west of the state capital, Brisbane. The Warrego Highway traverses from east to west through the locality, passing through the town. The Western railway line also traverses from east to west immediately south and parallel to the highway with the town being served by Dulacca railway station.

Dulacca Creek flows through the locality from the town to the south, eventually being a tributary to the Balonne River.

== History ==
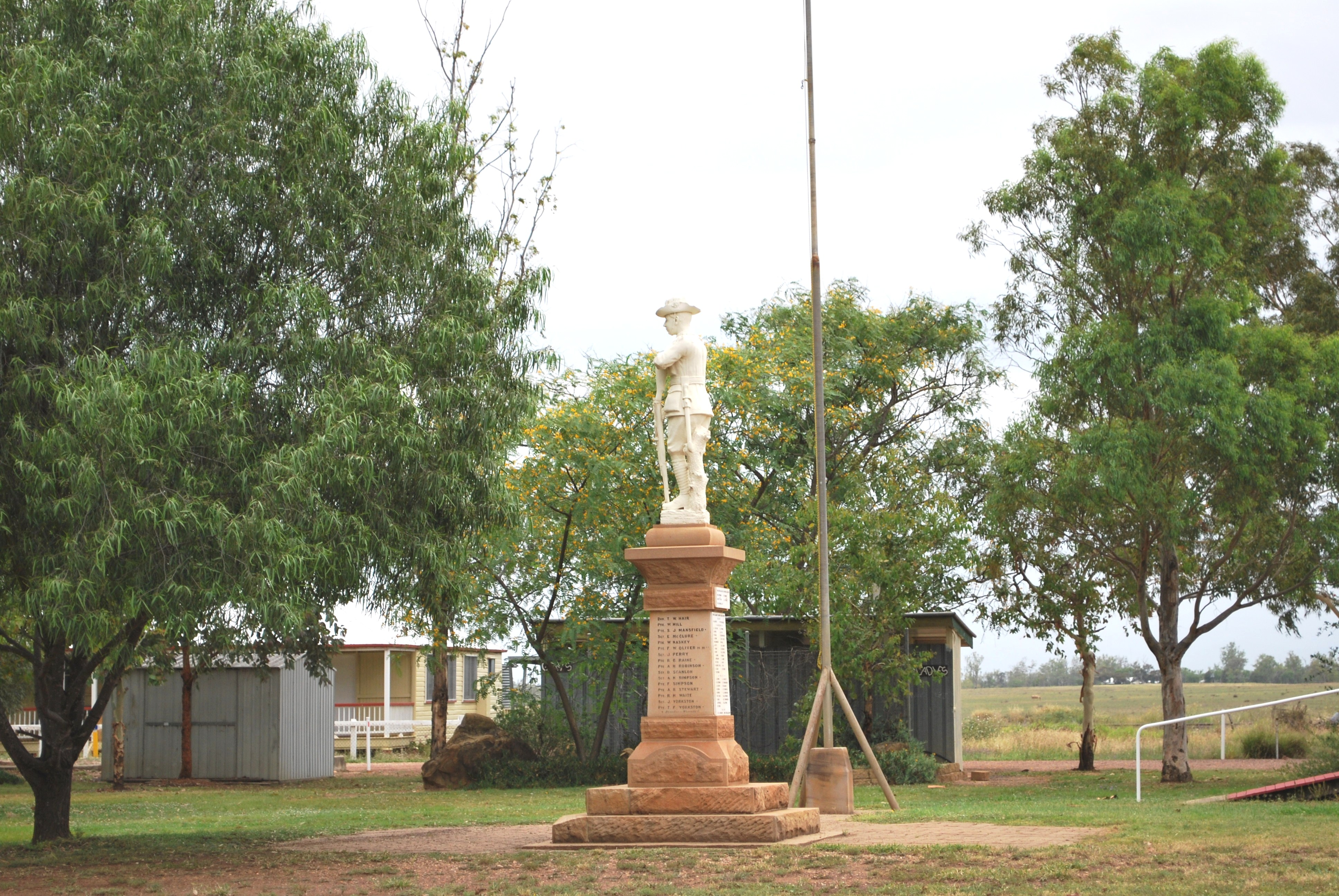
Dulacca War Memorial, 2008

The name Dulacca is believed to be derived from the Aboriginal word doolucah meaning emu nest.

Dulacca Post Office opened on 3 March 1879.

Dulacca State School opened on 1 March 1909.

The Dulacca Presbyterian Church opened in 1910, constructed from local cypress pine. After its closure the property passed into private hands. In 1977 the church building was donated and relocated to the Miles Historical Village on the condition it was not used for church services.

North Dulacca Hall was officially opened on Friday 23 May 1913 by Godfrey Morgan, the Member of the Queensland Legislative Assembly for Murilla. The hall has closed but the building is still extant (as at 2023). It was on North Dulacca Hall Road, now within neighbouring Bogandilla to the north.

Rainville State School opened on 29 April 1912 but closed in 1917 due to low student numbers. It reopened in 1918 but closed again on 25 February 1921. On 6 April 1925, it reopened as Dulucca South State School, but closed in 1930 before reopening again in 1933. It closed permanently on 30 December 1946. It was on the north-eastern corner of Dulacca South Road and Butlers Extension Road (26.77046°S 149.78679°E).

Dulacca North State School opened on 28 January 1919, closing in 1936 due to low student numbers. It reopened in 1941 and closed permanently in 1953. It was on the south-west corner of Dulacca North Road (previously North Dulacca School Road) and Frizzells Road, now within the neighbouring locality of Bogandilla to the north.

The Dulacca War Memorial was dedicated on 3 December 1921.

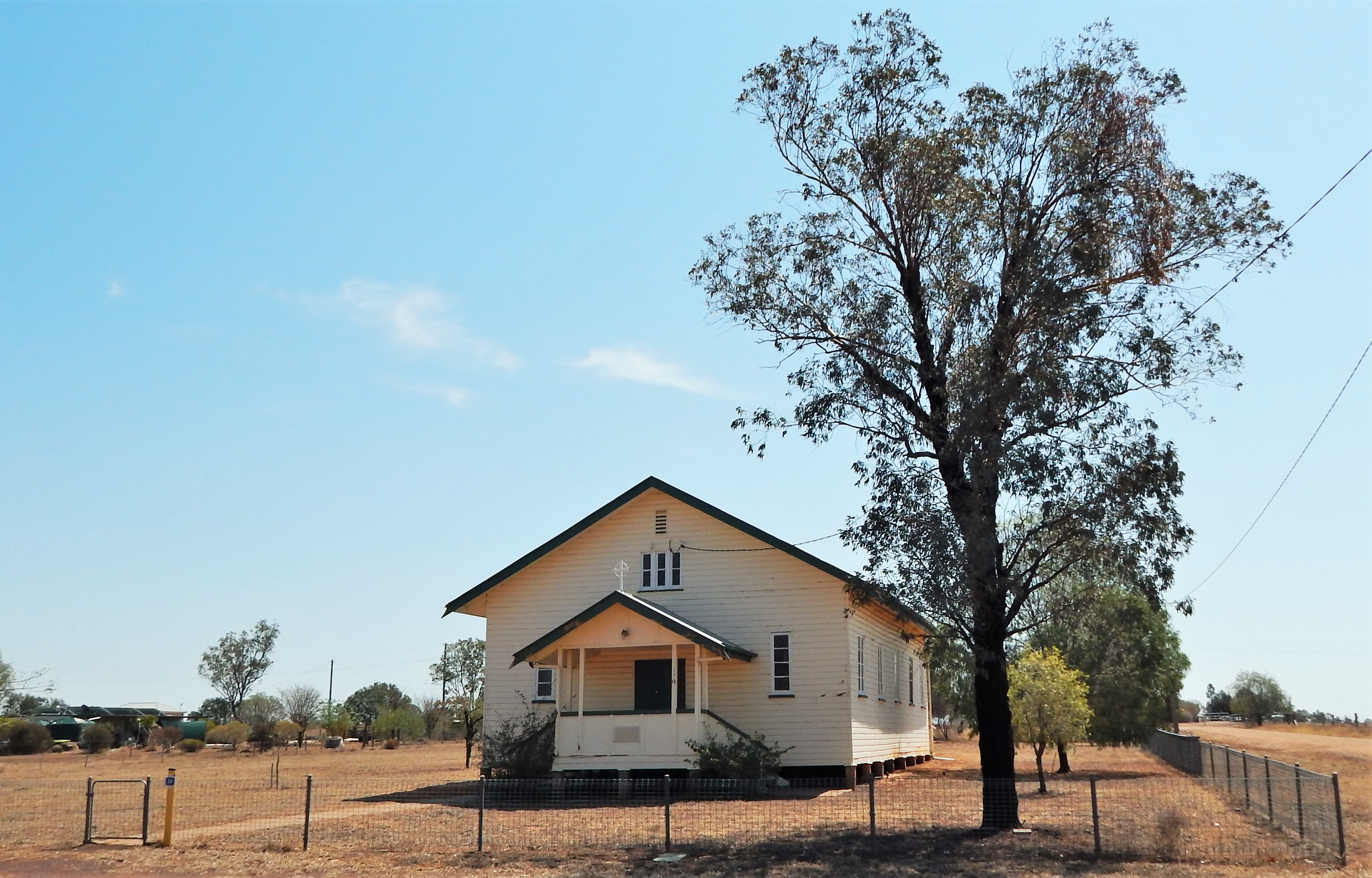
Catholic Church of the Assumption, 2019

On 11 November 1951 the Roman Catholic Bishop of Toowoomba Joseph Basil Roper blessed and opened the Church of the Assumption of the Blessed Virgin Mary.

St James The Less Anglican church was dedicated on 24 May 1958 by the Right Revd. David Hand, Assistant Bishop of the Diocese of New Guinea. It was at 5 Temple Street (26.6430°S 149.7620°E). Its closure on 29 August 2015 was approved by Bishop Cameron Venables. It was sold into private ownership for $27,500 in April 2018.

== Demographics ==
In the 2011 census, the locality of Dulacca had a population of 249 people.

In the 2016 census, the locality of Dulacca had a population of 191 people.

In the 2021 census, the locality of Dulacca had a population of 131 people.

== Education ==
Dulacca State School is a government primary (Prep-6) school for boys and girls on the north-east corner of North Road and Glynn Avenue (26.6423°S 149.7569°E). In 2016, the school had an enrolment of 24 students with 3 teachers (2 full-time equivalent) and 5 non-teaching staff (2 full-time equivalent). In 2018, the school had an enrolment of 23 students with 4 teachers (2 full-time equivalent) and 4 non-teaching staff (2 full-time equivalent).

There are no secondary schools in Dulacca. The nearest government secondary school is Miles State High School in Miles to the east.

== Facilities ==
Dulacca Police Station is at 15 Glynn Avenue at the corner with Killarney Street (26.6436°S 149.7584°E).

Dulacca Fire Station is at 28 Glynn Avenue (26.6439°S 149.7602°E) immediately adjacent to the Dulacca SES Facility (26.6439°S 149.7605°E).

== Amenities ==
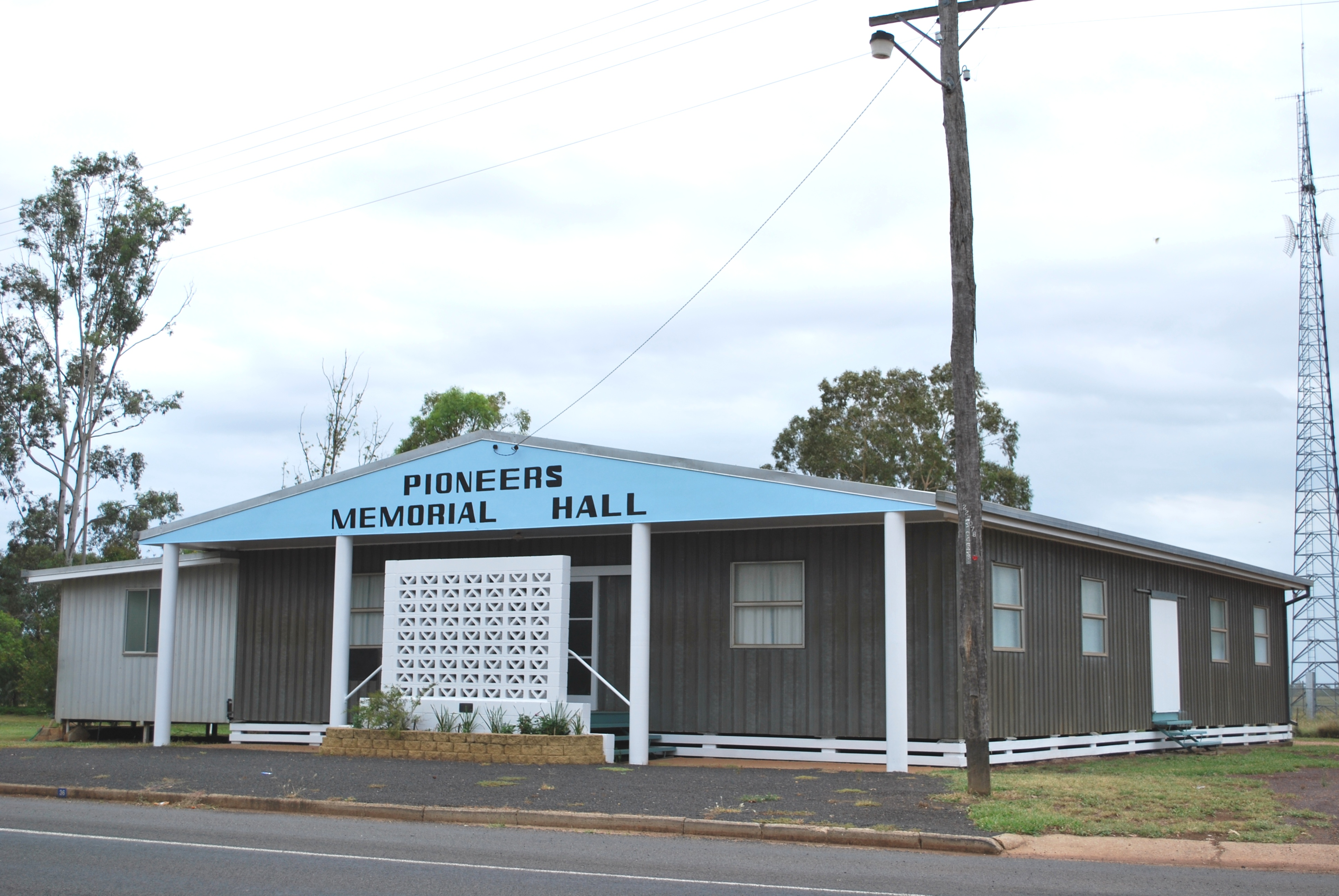
Dulacca Pioneers Memorial Hall, 2008

Dulacca Country Golf Club is a 9-hole golf course at 89 Dulacca Golf Club Road (26.6474°S 149.7699°E).

Dulacca Pioneers Memorial Hall is at 36 Glynn Avenue (26.6439°S 149.7615°E). It is operated by the Dulacca Pioneers Memorial Hall And Progress Association. The Dulacca Post Office operates within the hall. The Dulacca War Memorial (a digger statue) is in its grounds (26.6438°S 149.7617°E).

The Catholic Church of the Assumption is at 39 Bell Street (on the north-west corner with Jubilee Avenue, 26.6406°S 149.7636°E).

The Dulacca Presbyterian Church is at 4 Temple Street (26.6428°S 149.7625°E).
