= Yuleba =

- Town
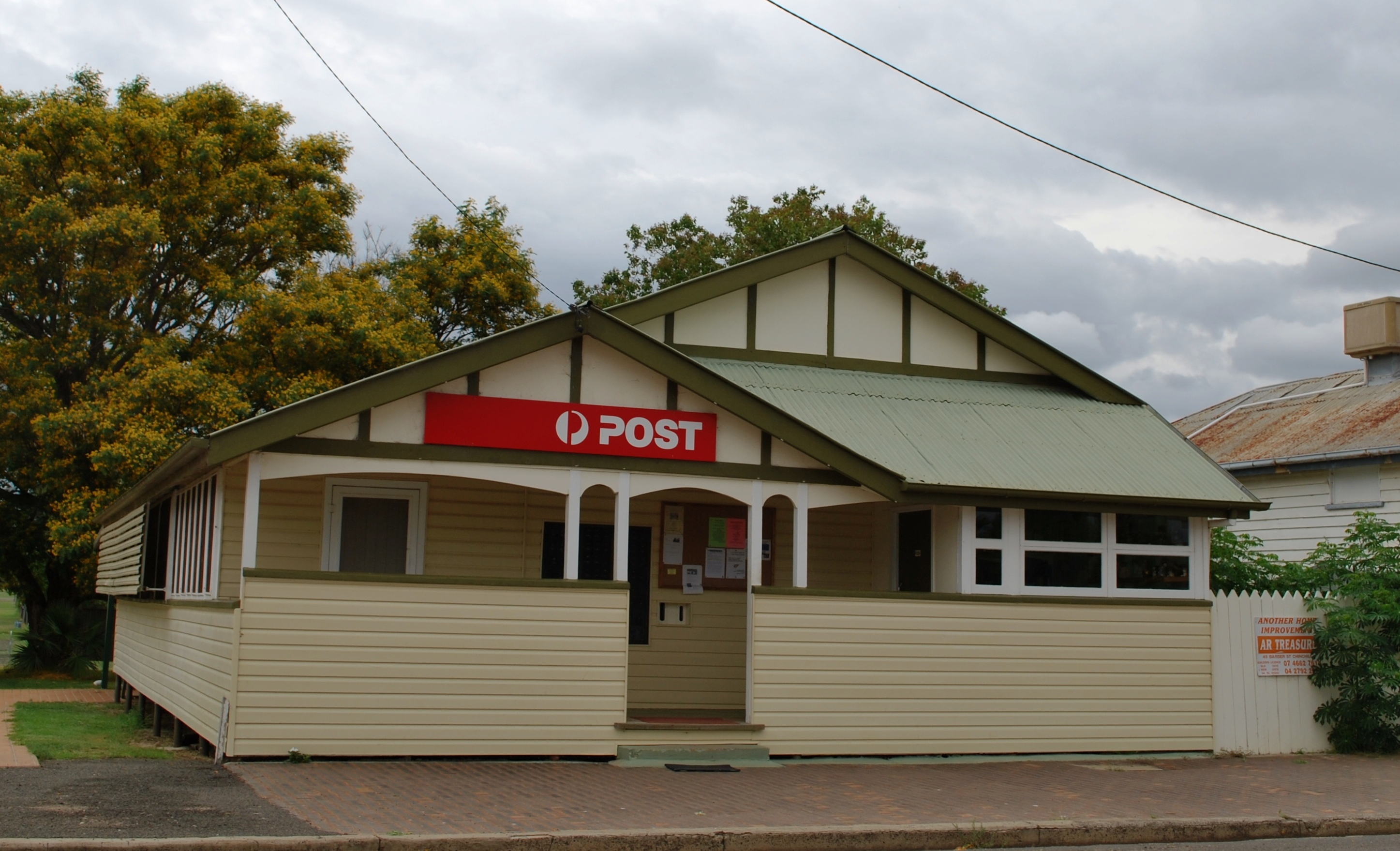
- Post office at Yuleba

- Interactive map of Yuleba
- Coordinates: 26.6130°S 149.3825°E
- Country: Australia
- State: Queensland
- LGA: Maranoa Region
- Location: 60.7 km (37.7 mi) E of Roma; 81.6 km (50.7 mi) W of Miles; 291 km (181 mi) NW of Toowoomba; 419 km (260 mi) WNW of Brisbane
- Established: 1865

Government
  - State electorate: Warrego
  - Federal division: Maranoa

Area
  - Total: 87.7 km^{2} (33.9 sq mi)

Population
  - Total: 271 (2021 census)
  - Density: 3.090/km^{2} (8.003/sq mi)
- Time zone: UTC+10:00 (AEST)
- Postcode: 4427
Localities around Yuleba
Wallumbilla North	Yuleba North	Yuleba North
Yuleba South	Yuleba	Jackson South
Yuleba South	Yuleba South	Yuleba South

Yuleba (/ˈjuːlbɑː/ YOO-l-BAH) is a rural town and locality in the Maranoa Region, in the south-west of Queensland, Australia. In the 2021 census, the locality of Yuleba had a population of 271 people.

== Geography ==
Yuleba is located 327 kilometres (203 miles) east of Charleville, 61 kilometres (38 miles) east of Roma, 294 kilometres (183 miles) west of Toowoomba, 82 kilometres (51 miles) west of Miles, 420 kilometres (260 mi) west of the state capital, Brisbane along the Warrego Highway.

== Indigenous People ==
Mandandanji (also known as Mandandanyi, Mandandanjdji, Kogai) is an Australian Aboriginal language spoken by the Mandandanji people. The Mandandanji language region includes the landscape within the local government boundaries of the Maranoa Regional Council, particularly Roma, Yuleba and Surat, then east towards Chinchilla and south-west towards Mitchell and St George.

The town is said to be named after an Aboriginal word meaning "the place of water lilies".

== History ==
When it was named in 1865, it was a settlement on Yuleba Creek. However, in October 1879 the town moved to the railway crossing on Yuleba Creek and was officially called Baltinglass. However, this was changed to Yuleba in 1901. However, due to an error in assembling a sign for the railway station, the station and the town were known as the misspelt Yeulba. In 1938, the name was changed to the original intended name of Yuleba.

Baltinglass Provisional School opened on 10 November 1880. On 1 April 1884, it was renamed Yeulba State School. In 1939, the spelling of the name was changed to Yuleba State School.

As a railhead for the region to the west, the town was an important centre until the railway was extended again to Roma in 1910.

The last Cobb and Co stagecoach between Yuleba and Surat ran on 16 August 1924.

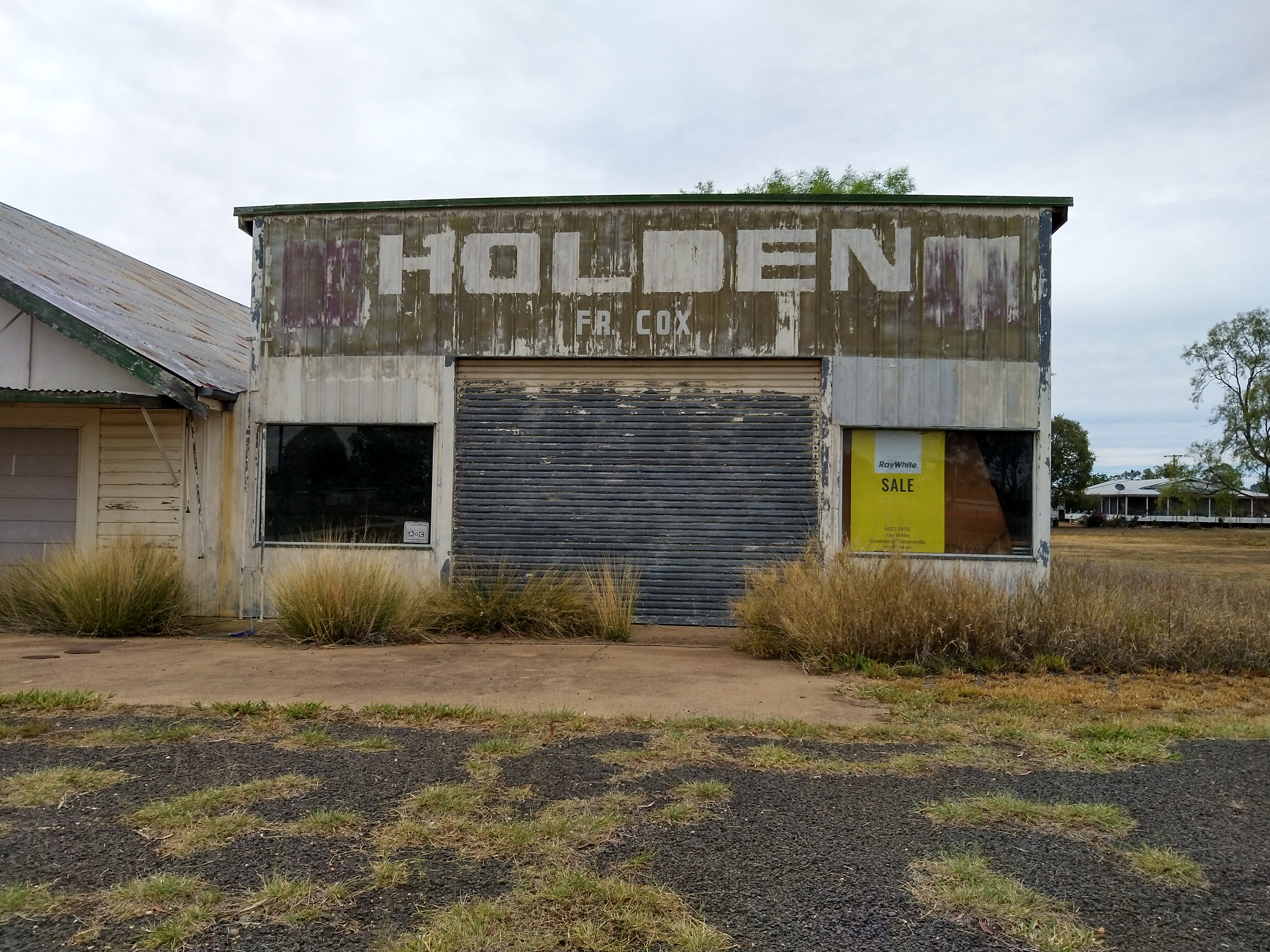
Stephenson Street garage built by Fergus Cox in 1952.

In 1954 the former Bendemere Shire Council (now a constituent part of the Maranoa Region) erected a memorial hall in Yuleba with an honor board commemorating those from the shire who had served in World War II. It was officially opened on 15 May 1954 by Alfred Dohring, the Member of the Queensland Legislative Assembly for Roma.

On 9 October 1964 Queensland Premier Frank Nicklin unveiled a large mural at the Yuleba Memorial Hall. The mural depicts many scenes of war and was painted by local artist and jackaroo Robert (Fred) Doyle.

The Yuleba Public Library had a major refurbishment in 2015 undertaken by the Maranoa Regional Council.

== Demographics ==
In the 2006 census, the locality of Yuleba had a population of 183 people.

In the 2016 census, the locality of Yuleba had a population of 207 people.

In the 2021 census, the locality of Yuleba had a population of 271 people.

== Education ==
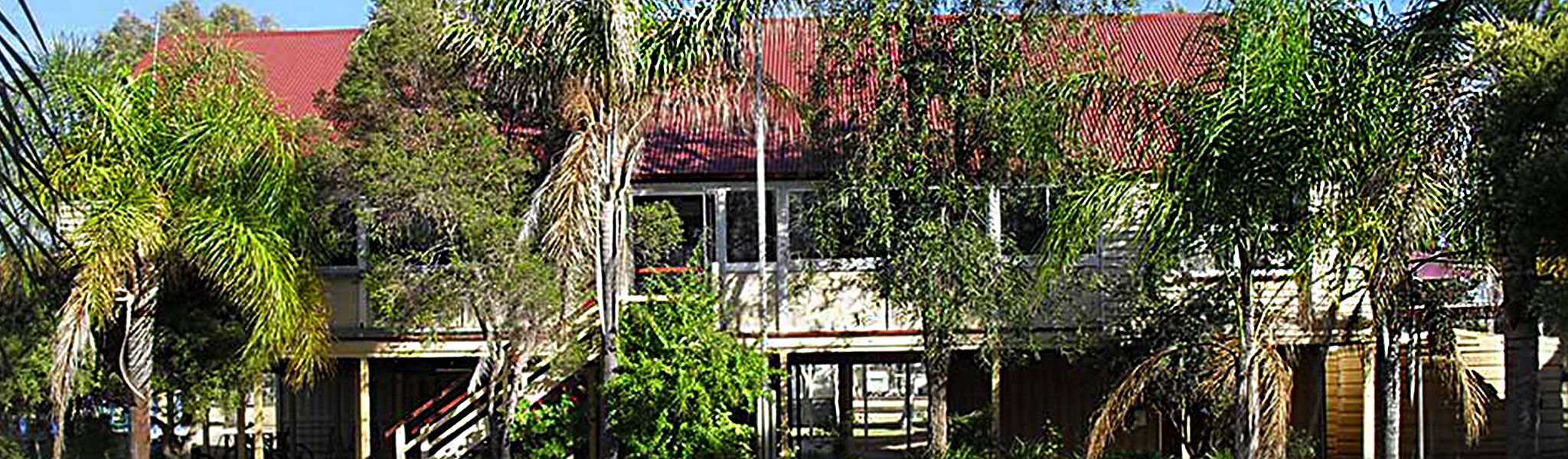
Yuleba State School, 2025

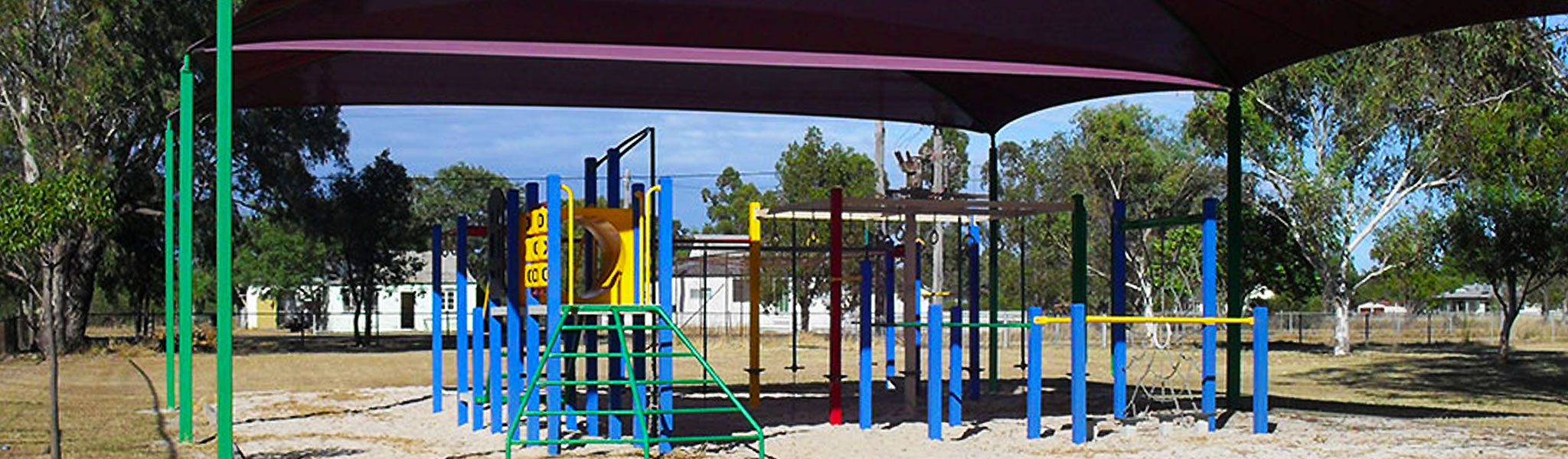
Yuleba State School playground, 2025

Yuleba State School is a government primary (Prep-6) school for boys and girls at Perry Street (26.6145°S 149.3819°E). In 2018, the school had an enrolment of 23 students with 2 teachers and 5 non-teaching staff (2 full-time equivalent). In 2022, the school had 31 students.

There are no secondary schools in Yuleba. The closest secondary school is Wallumbilla State School in Wallumbill which provides secondary school education to Year 10. The nearest government secondary schools offering Years 11 and 12 are Roma State College in Roma (61 km (38 mi) west) and Miles State High School in Miles (81 km (50 mi) east).

== Economy ==
Today, Yuleba is the site of a modern mining and processing facility working a high grade silica deposit.

== Transportation ==
Yuleba is serviced by the Western Railway Line to Charleville.

Yuleba Railway Station is a timetabled stop for Queensland Rail Travel's twice - weekly Westlander services between Roma Street Railway Station and Charleville Railway Station.

- the Westbound service (3S86) to Charleville stops at Yuleba on Wednesdays and Fridays at 5:02am (passengers travelling to Wallumbilla are requested to alight from the service here for onward transport to Wallumbilla).
- the Eastbound service (3987) to Roma Street stops at Yuleba on Thursdays and Saturdays at 12:40am.

Yuleba is ideally situated on the Warrego Highway as it is on the major Brisbane - Darwin arterial trade route.

The Yuleba Hotel - Motel is the designated stop for Greyhound Australia's daily Intercity services:

- Gx493 (Brisbane - Mount Isa)
- Gx494 (Mount Isa - Brisbane)
- Gx495 (Brisbane - Charleville)
- Gx496 (Charleville - Brisbane)

== Amenities ==
The Maranoa Regional Council operates a public library in Yuleba at Stephenson Street with a high-speed ISDN Internet Connection (provided through the National Broadband Network) to Brisbane.
