= Maranoa Region =

Coordinates: 25°47′33″S 148°35′33″E

- Local government area
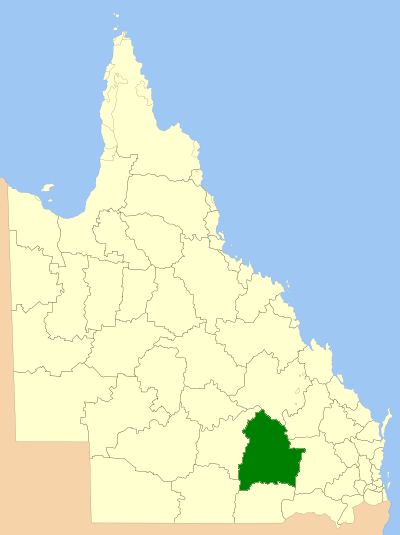
- Location in Queensland

- Interactive map of Maranoa Region
- Country: Australia
- State: Queensland
- Region: Maranoa
- Council seat: Roma

Government
  - Mayor: Wendy Taylor
  - State electorate: Warrego
  - Federal division: Maranoa

Area
  - Total: 58,705 km^{2} (22,666 sq mi)

Population
  - Total: 12,825 (2021 census)
  - Density: 0.218465/km^{2} (0.565822/sq mi)
- Website: Maranoa Region
LGAs around Maranoa Region
Murweh	Central Highlands	Banana
Murweh	Maranoa Region	Western Downs
Paroo	Balonne	Western Downs

Maranoa Region is a local government area in South West Queensland, Australia. The town of Roma is the administrative headquarters of the region.

In the 2021 census, the Maranoa Region had a population of 12,825 people.

== History ==
The Gunggari language region of South West Queensland includes the landscape within the local government boundaries of the Maranoa Region particularly the towns of Mitchell, Amby, Dunkeld and Mungallala and the properties of Forest Vale and North Yanco.

Gungabula (also known as Kongabula and Khungabula) is an Australian Aboriginal language of the headwaters of the Dawson River in Central Queensland. The language region includes areas within the local government area of Maranoa Region, particularly the towns of Charleville, Augathella and Blackall and as well as the Carnarvon Range.

On 17 May 1927, 57 allotments of Mount Abundance land, south-west of Roma, were advertised for lease by the Lands Department. Each lease carried a condition that a certain area had to be cultivated with wheat within a specified period. A map advertised the offer which ran from the 17 to 31 May 1927.

In July 2007, the Local Government Reform Commission released a report recommending a number of amalgamations of local government areas in Queensland. As a result, under the Local Government (Reform Implementation) Act 2007, on 15 March 2008, the new local government area of Roma Region was created, as an amalgamation of five previous local government areas:

- the Town of Roma;
- the Shire of Bendemere;
- the Shire of Booringa;
- the Shire of Bungil;
- and the Shire of Warroo.

The report recommended that its people elect eight councillors and a mayor and it should not be divided into wards. The Maranoa Region covers an area of 58,705 square kilometres (22,666 sq mi), and had a population in June 2018 of 12,791, and has an operating budget of A$44.2m per annum.

On 26 July 2009, Roma Region was renamed Maranoa Region.

== Demographics ==
In the 2016 census, the Maranoa Region had a population of 12,666 people.

In the 2021 census, the Maranoa Region had a population of 12,825 people.

== Towns and localities ==
The Maranoa Region includes the following settlements:

Roma area:

- Roma (town)

Bendemere area:

- Yuleba (town)
- Jackson (locality)
- Wallumbilla (town)
- Wallumbilla North (locality)
- Wallumbilla South (locality)

Booringa area:

- Mitchell (town)
- Amby (locality)
- Mungallala (locality)

Bungil area:

- Eumamurrin
- Euthulla
- Injune (town)
- Muckadilla (locality)
- Mount Abundance (locality)
- Tingun

Warroo area:

- Dunkeld (locality)
- Noorindoo
- Surat (town)

== Amenities ==
Maranoa Regional Council operates public libraries at Injune, Jackson, Mitchell, Mungallala, Roma, Surat, Wallumbilla, and Yuleba.

== Mayors ==
- 2008–2016: Robert ("Scruff") Loughnan (former mayor of Bungil Shire Council)
- 2016–2024: Tyson Duthie Golder
- 2024 - present: Wendy Maree Taylor
