= Wallumbilla, Queensland =

Wallumbilla
- Town
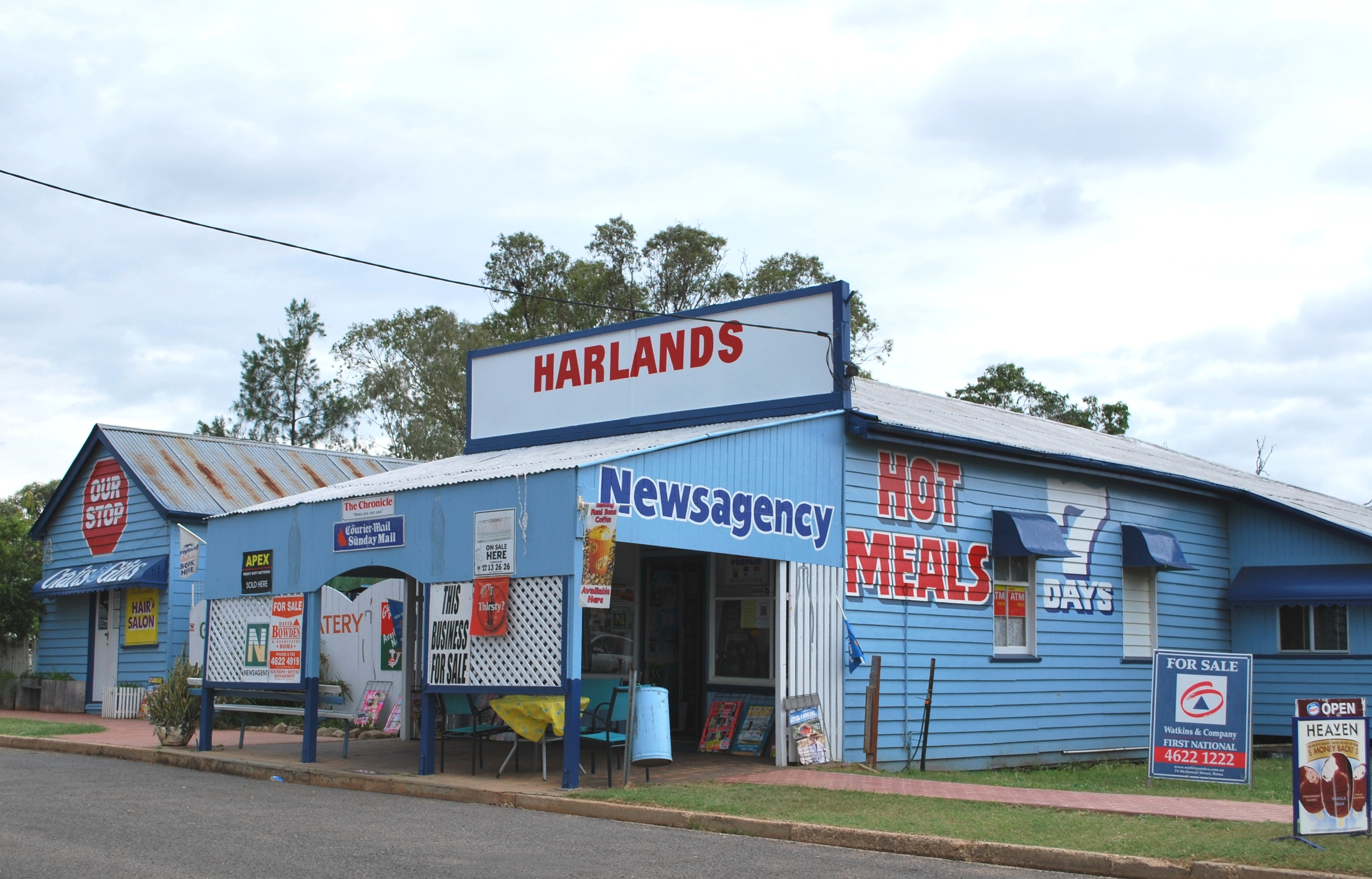
- Newsagency and general store

- Interactive map of Wallumbilla
- Coordinates: 26.5869°S 149.1863°E
- Country: Australia
- State: Queensland
- LGA: Maranoa Region
- Location: 308.6 km (191.8 mi) E of Charleville; 40.6 km (25.2 mi) E of Roma; 101 km (63 mi) W of Miles; 311 km (193 mi) NW of Toowoomba; 437 km (272 mi) NW of Brisbane

Government
  - State electorate: Warrego
  - Federal division: Maranoa

Area
  - Total: 93.9 km^{2} (36.3 sq mi)
- Elevation: 320 m (1,050 ft)

Population
  - Total: 331 (2021 census)
  - Density: 3.525/km^{2} (9.130/sq mi)
- Time zone: UTC+10:00 (AEST)
- Postcode: 4428
Localities around Wallumbilla
Pickanjinnee	Wallumbilla North	Wallumbilla North
Pickanjinnee	Wallumbilla	Wallumbilla North
Wallumbilla South	Wallumbilla South	Wallumbilla South

Wallumbilla is a rural town and locality in the Maranoa Region, Queensland, Australia. In the 2021 census, the locality of Wallumbilla had a population of 331 people, with 199 people living in the town itself.

== Geography ==
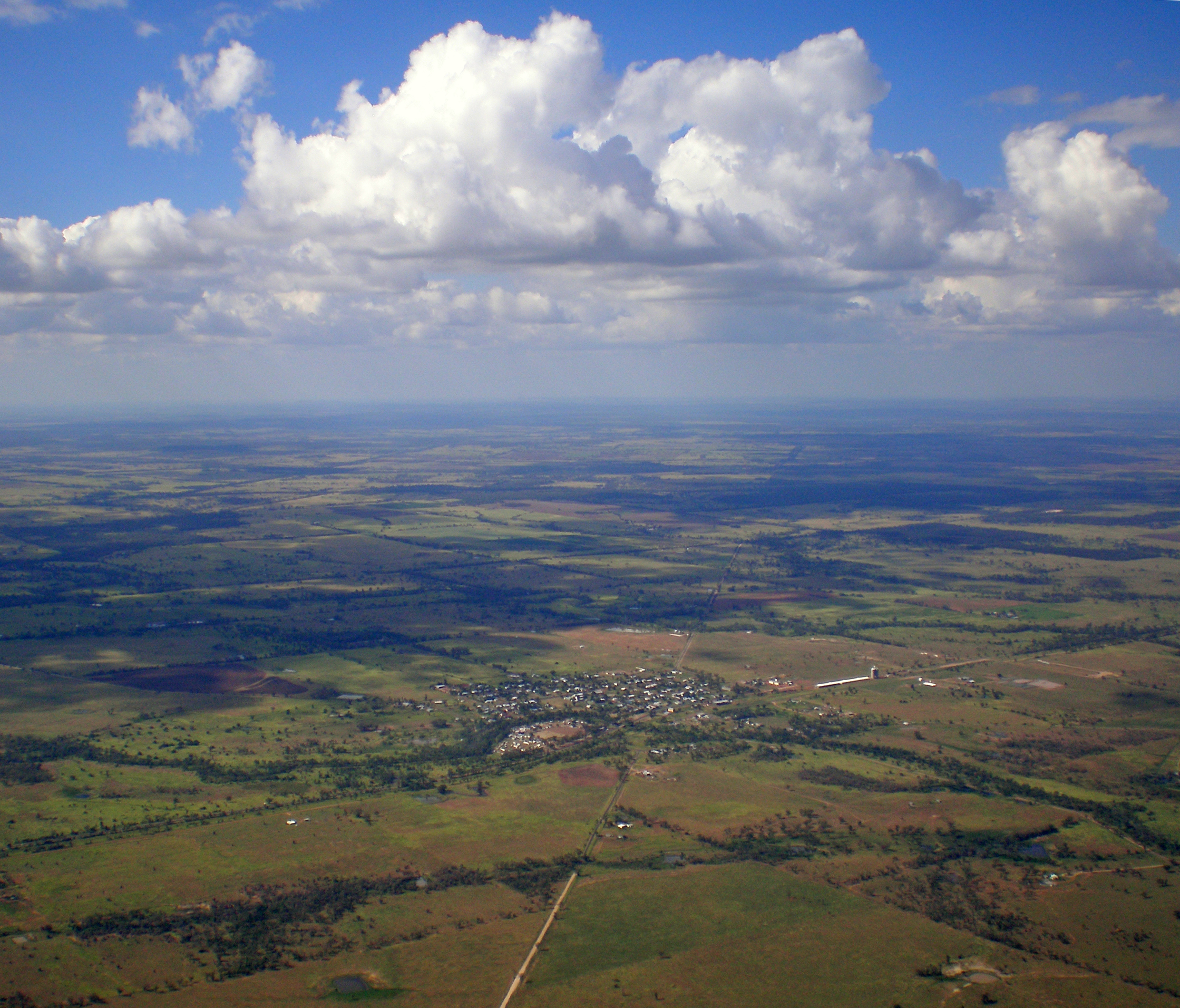
Wallumbilla, March 2010, looking to the nor-nor-east.

Wallumbilla is situated on the Warrego Highway, five hours by road west from Brisbane, just east of Roma in South West Queensland.

To the north of Wallumbilla the Great Dividing Range (in this region no more than a bumpy watershed) passes roughly ESE to NNW. The town is sandwiched between Wallumbilla & Middle Creeks as they flow south toward the Condamine/Balonne River.

Wallumbilla is on the Western railway line and is served by the Wallumbilla railway station (26.5872°S 149.1879°E).

== History ==
The name Wallumbilla was the name of a pastoral run leased by Charles Coxen, The name is presumed to come from the indigenous Mandandanji language and reportedly means wallu=plenty and billa=jew fish.

Wallumbilla Provisional School opened on 25 October 1893, becoming Wallumbilla State School on 1 September 1894. From January 1964, secondary schooling was offered in the Memorial Hall opposite the school, until it became possible to accommodate the secondary students on the school site from April 1965. A swimming pool was added to the school in 1981.

On Saturday 17 May 1929, the Wallumbilla School of Arts Memorial Hall was officially opened by Godfrey Morgan, the local Member of the Queensland Legislative Assembly for Murilla.

On 1 December 1956, The Westlander collided head-on with the Western Mail which was stationary at Wallumbilla railway station. The crash killed 5 people and injured 11 or 13 people. There is a memorial at the railway station commemorating the crash.

In 2017, a combined Rural Fire station and SES facility was built.

== Demographics ==
In the 2006 census, the town of Wallumbilla had a population of 285 people.

In the 2011 census, the locality of Wallumbilla had a population of 262 people.

In the 2016 census, the locality of Wallumbilla had a population of 388 people, with 191 people living in the town itself.

In the 2021 census, the locality of Wallumbilla had a population of 331 people, with 199 people living in the town itself.

== Heritage listings ==
Wallumbilla has a number of heritage-listed sites, including:

- Nostalgic Queen's Theatre, George Street (26.5869°S 149.1865°E)

== Economy ==
A major gas hub is in preparation for Wallumbilla, planned to start operation in 2014.

== Education ==
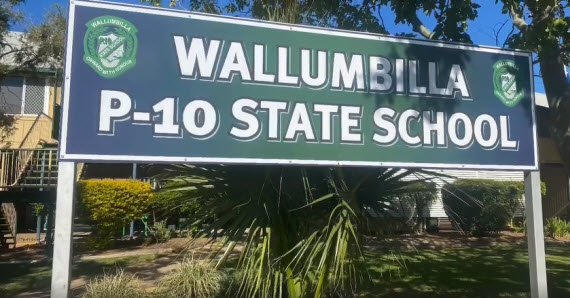
Wallumbilla State School sign, circa 2022

Wallumbilla State School is a government primary and secondary (Kindergarten to Year 10) school for boys and girls at 22 High Street (26.5843°S 149.1861°E). In 2016, the school had an enrolment of 106 students with 15 teachers (12 full-time equivalent) and 10 non-teaching staff (7 full-time equivalent). In 2018, the school had an enrolment of 126 students with 16 teachers (12 full-time equivalent) and 13 non-teaching staff (8 full-time equivalent).

The nearest schools offering Years 11 and 12 of secondary education are Roma State College and St. John's College in Roma (40 kilometres west) and Miles State High School in Miles (90 kilometres east).

== Facilities ==
Wallumbilla Police Station is on the corner of Flinders Street and High Street (26.5841°S 149.1877°E).

Wallumbilla Rural Fire Station and SES Facility is a combined emergency service centre at 1-3 Russell Street (26.5825°S 149.1916°E).

Wallumbilla Community Clinic (sometimes called Wallumbillla Hospital) is a government health facility at 1-7 West Street (corner of Stakeyard Road, 26.5817°S 149.1813°E).

Wallumbilla Monumental & Lawn Cemetery is on the north-west corner of Wallumbilla North Road and Stolz Lane (26.5729°S 149.1870°E).

== Amenities ==
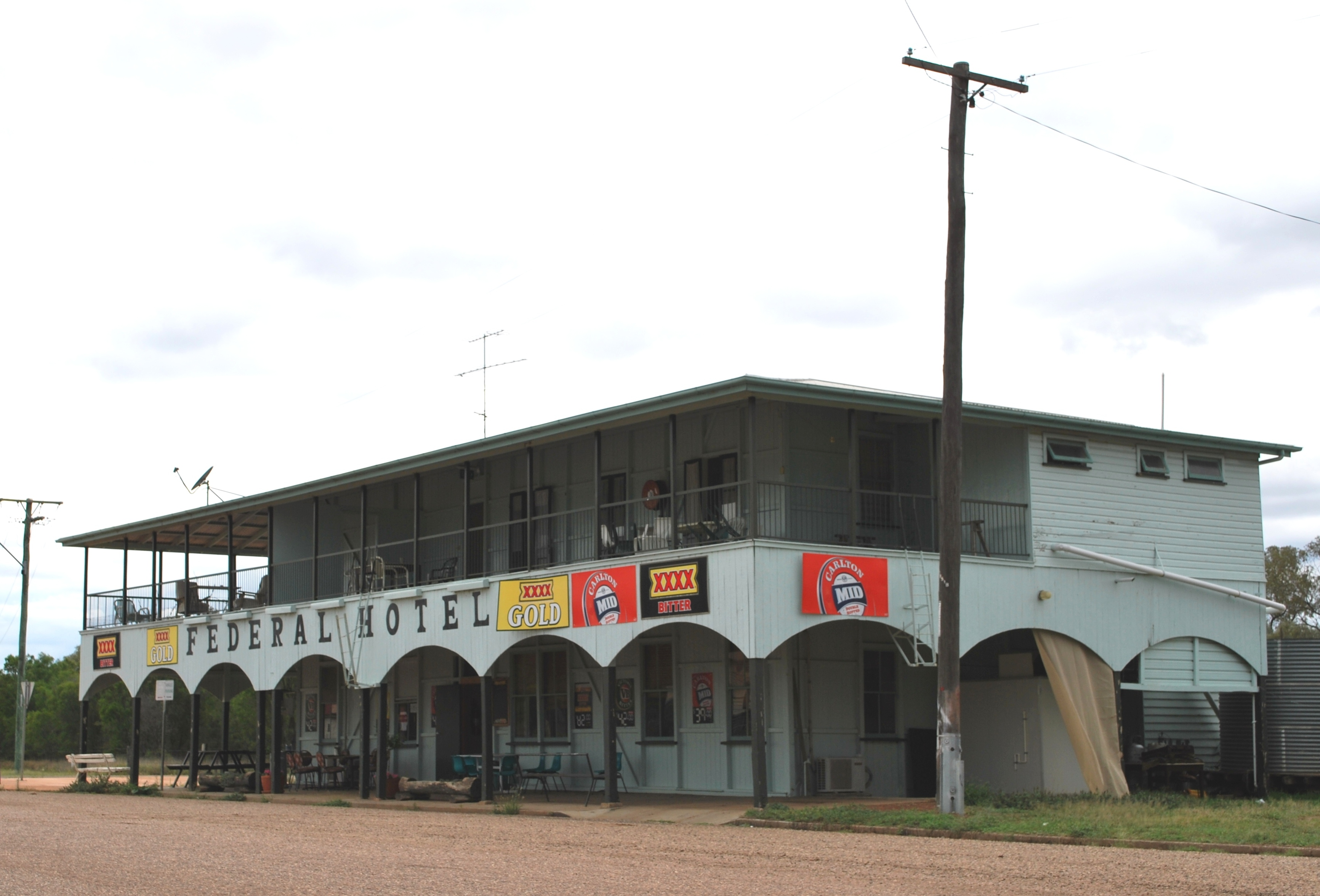
Federal Hotel, Wallumbilla, 2008

The town has the following churches:

- St John the Baptist Anglican Church, on the corner of Burke and High Streets
- Wallumbilla Uniting Church, High Street
- St Mary's Catholic Church, Flinders Street

A public library (operated by the Maranoa Regional Council) is in George Street.

The Wallumbilla branch of the Queensland Country Women's Association has its rooms at 15 College Street.

Wallumbilla School of Arts Memorial Hall is at 8 Chadstone Street (26.5840°S 149.18656°E).

The town has a Masonic Hall known as Corona.

== Attractions ==
Wallumbilla's Calico Cottage, open seven days a week, is the town's Visitor Information Centre. It includes a heritage centre with displays of photographs and memorabilia. As well as this, Calico Cottage sells locally produced arts and crafts along with refreshments. It is at 36 George Street.
