= Aster =

Aster or ASTER may refer to:

== Biology ==
- Aster (genus), a genus of flowering plants
  - List of Aster synonyms, other genera formerly included in Aster and still called asters in English
- Aster (cell biology), a cellular structure shaped like a star, formed around each centrosome during mitosis
- Aster, a star-shaped sponge spicule

== Military ==
- Aster (missile family), a family of surface-to-air missiles, produced jointly by France, Italy and the United Kingdom
- USS Aster, a Civil War Union Navy tugboat
- HMS Aster, two Royal Navy ships
- Belgian minehunter Aster (M915), ship
- Operation Aster, by the Soviet Army in 1944 in Estonia

== Motorcars ==
- Ateliers de Construction Mecanique l'Aster, a French automobile and engine manufacturer from 1900 to 1910
- Aster Società Italiana Motori, an Italian automobile manufacturer from 1906 to 1908
- Aster (automobile), a British automobile manufactured between 1922 and 1930

== Non-government organizations ==
- Aster (restaurant), a restaurant in Mission, California
- Aster (venture capital company)
- Aster Data Systems, an American data management and analysis software company
- Aster DM Healthcare, an Indian health care provider

== People ==
- Aster (name), a list of people with either the given name or surname
- Aster Berkhof, a pen name of Belgian writer Lodewijk Paulina Van Den Bergh (1920–2020)
- Jack Aster, newspaper pen name of Walter Russell Crampton (1877–1938), Australian trade unionist, journalist and politician

== Places ==
- Aster, Edmonton, a neighbourhood in Canada
- Aster Glacier, Antarctica
- 1218 Aster, a main-belt asteroid

== Protagonists ==
- Aster Laker, a supporting character from the game Tales of Symphonia: Dawn of the New World
- Aster Phoenix, from the Japanese anime Yu-Gi-Oh! GX
- E. Aster Bunnymund, a re-imagining of the Easter Bunny in the 2012 animated film Rise of the Guardians
- Molly Aster, from the Peter Pan series
- Sajit Aster, from the Japanese manga Waltz in a White Dress
- Neve, Gliz and Aster, official mascots of the 2006 Winter Paralympics

== Other uses ==
- Aster (typeface), a serif-class of typeface
- ASTER (sensor), a Japanese sensor on board the Terra satellite
- ASTER (spacecraft), a 2021 spacecraft mission by Brazil
- Aster (album), a 2023 album by Tokoyami Towa
- Aster CT-80, a 1982 Dutch home computer
- Aster MIMS, a hospital in Kozhikode, India

== See also ==
- Aster Revolution, in Hungary in 1918
- Astor (disambiguation)
- Asterism (disambiguation)
