= Paragon Theatre =

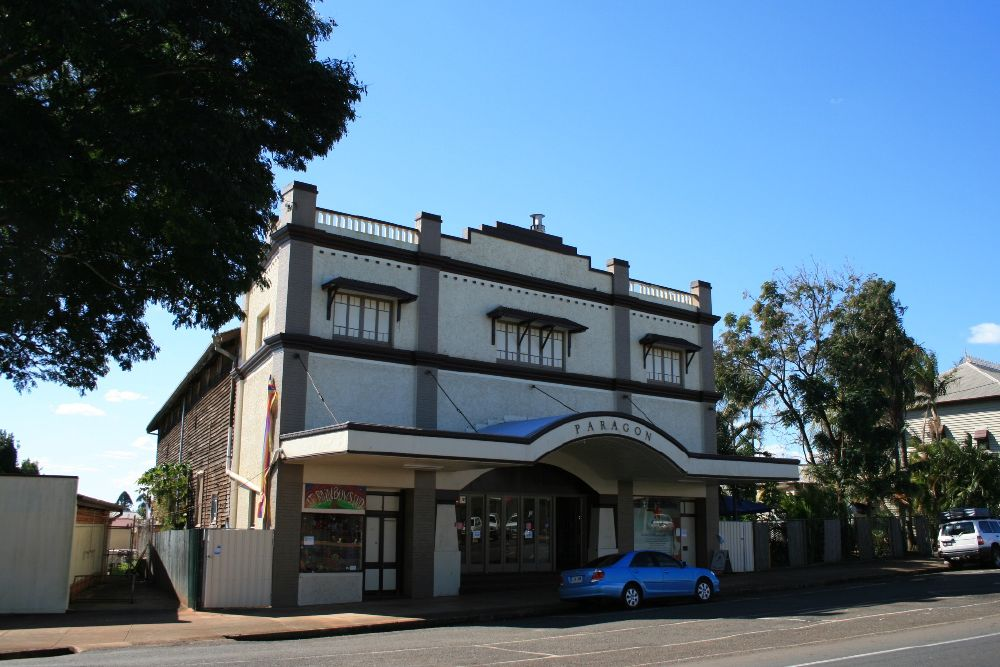
- Paragon Theatre, 2011

- Location within Queensland Location within Australia
- 25.2361°S 152.2767°E
- Location: 75 Churchill Street, Childers, Bundaberg Region, Queensland, Australia

History
- Design period: 1919–1930s (interwar period)
- Built: 1927

Site notes
- Architect: Arthur Robson

Queensland Heritage Register
- Official name: Paragon Theatre
- Type: state heritage (built)
- Designated: 28 April 2000
- Reference no.: 601618
- Significant period: 1927 (fabric); 1927–ongoing (social)
- Significant components: auditorium, foyer – entrance, proscenium arch, shop/s, projection booth/bio box, dress circle
- Builders: P Mellefont, Jnr

Paragon Theatre is a heritage-listed cinema and theatre at 75 Churchill Street, Childers, Bundaberg Region, Queensland, Australia. It was designed by Arthur Robson and built in 1927 by P Mellefont, Jnr. It was added to the Queensland Heritage Register on 28 April 2000.

== History ==
The Paragon Theatre in Childers was constructed in 1927 for local film exhibitors Gee, Philpott and Gee. It was designed by Brisbane architect Arthur Robson and replaced a smaller refreshment rooms and entertainment hall/picture show on the site.

Childers in 1927 was a prosperous sugar town established in the late 1880s at the head of the Isis railway line from Isis Junction into the surrounding scrub. The line, which opened on 31 October 1887, was intended to facilitate the transport of timber from the Isis Scrub, but also proved to be the catalyst for the establishment of a sugar industry in the district. By 1895, Childers had emerged as the flourishing centre of a substantial sugar-growing and sugar-milling district, and in the years between 1891 and 1900 the population grew from 91 to 4000. In 1903 the old Isis Divisional Board (1886) was abolished and Isis Shire proclaimed, with the new seat of municipal government moving from Howard to Childers.

Mr William Gee, a confectioner from Bundaberg, moved to Childers with his wife Minette and their two children about 1906. The Gees bought a single-storeyed shop where the Paragon Theatre now stands, in the main street of Childers, and opened it as a refreshment rooms (fruit shop, tea rooms and catering business). By 1908 they had added a ballroom in the form of a second floor to the building, and this was used for various functions, including Friday and Saturday night dances before the floor was ruined by roller skating. In 1912, the Gees installed a lighting plant run by an oil fuelled engine, and Gee's Hall became the venue for the first silent movies screened in the district. The first film shown was The Iron Claw, starring Pearl White. The Gees also introduced a travelling picture show service to other towns in the Isis district, including Dallarnil and Booyal.

By 1923 a second picture show, the Palace Theatre, had been opened in Childers. It was run by Harold Philpott in partnership with Mr A Archer, and was located in a hall behind the Palace Hotel in Churchill Street. Also by 1923, William Gee had disposed of his interest in Gee's Hall to his son Dudley and to Harold Philpott. He later retired with his wife and daughter to Sydney, where he died in 1926. By 1927, film-going had proved so popular that Philpott & Gee had determined to erect a modern, purpose-designed cinema in Childers. The scheme interested William Gee's daughter Margery, and a new firm, Gee, Philpott and Gee was established to facilitate the construction of the Paragon Theatre where Gee's Hall once stood. Some of the material from the original hall was used in the construction of the new theatre.

Plans were prepared by architect Arthur Robson of Brisbane, who was reported in the local press of 1927 as having been responsible for the construction of over twenty cinemas in Queensland, including theatres at East Brisbane, Gladstone and Ayr. Robson designed the Paragon Theatre as a tropical theatre. This may refer to the use of timber lattice and fretwork throughout the interior, on the ceiling and the proscenium, concealing high level windows providing ventilation not used in standard cinema design. The tropical theatre style was popular for Queensland theatres of the 1920s and 1930s, including the Alhambra Theatre at Stones Corner and the Paddington Theatre on Given Terrace, Paddington, Brisbane. The writer of an article on the Paragon Theatre in the Bundaberg Times Isis District Souvenir of 1927, commented:

In all centres it has been recognised that the old style theatres are not suitable, hence modern ideas have been brought to bear in the planning of structures suitable for the climatic conditions, and a new type of theatre evolved, one of which will rise on the site of the present Gee's Hall. (p19)

The theatre was intended to accommodate 1200 people, in a hall measuring 60 by 120 feet (18 by 37 m), but this may have been optimistic – the Film Weekly Directory of 1938–39 lists the Paragon Theatre at Childers with a seating capacity of 600. A large stage for both traditional drama and musical shows as well as the cinema screen, with adjoining dressing rooms, was provided, with an orchestra pit below the stage. The proscenium was decorated with timber fretwork incorporating transparent lining which concealed electric lighting. The ceiling and walls were lined with timber lattice. The theatre contained a dress circle and several private boxes with upholstered seating, and canvas seats and forms, or long benches, were provided in the stalls. The auditorium was constructed of timber with a galvanised iron roof, but the Mediterranean-styled decorative facade was of brick and stucco. The entrance was flagged by brick columns clad with glazed tiles and opened to a lobby 18 feet (5.5 m) wide by 15 feet (4.6 m) deep. The design also incorporated two small shops fronting the street, either side of the entrance, and employed the first cantilevered awning in the district. The contractor on the project was P Mellefont, junr.

During construction, Gee, Philpott & Gee screened films at the Palace Theatre and at the Band Hall at Childers until a temporary screen could be erected in the semi-completed Paragon Theatre. Reputedly, when the new picture theatre formally opened in 1928, the first film screened was Warner Brothers' 1927 classic The Jazz Singer, which pioneered synchronised-sound film production. If this were so, then the Paragon opened as a "talkie" theatre.

Soon after the opening of the new theatre Harold Philpott sold his share of the business to Dudley and Margery Gee, who exhibited under the name Paragon Pictures Company. The Paragon Theatre was now the only picture theatre in the Isis and regularly screened films and cartoons on Wednesday and Saturday nights, from 8 pm, for which seats could be reserved. The theatre was sold in 1949 to Peter and Mary Sourris of Gayndah, who changed the sound system, replaced the entrance gates with glass doors, closed one of the internal staircases to the dress circle, and replaced the forms with canvas seats. At this period the store run by Paul Cominos at the front of the theatre was closed. By 1960 the Sourris family had sold the theatre to Granville and Iris Knowles who constructed a ticket box and fitted a cinemascope screen, which closed the stage for concert use. The theatre was sold in 1962 to the Ricciardi family. The last film was shown in 1998.

In 2007 Thomas Griffiths and Merissa Ricciardi (granddaughter of the 1962 owners) purchased the theatre and worked to repair and restore its failing elements with the aim of accommodating a range of community uses. The business name Paragon Theatre (1962) remained registered. In October 2011, Ms Ricciardi and new co-owner Nigel Craft were continuing the restoration of the building to reopen it to the public as an entertainment venue. Merissa Ricciardi and Nigel Craft were married in the theatre in December 2012. The theatre reopened in July 2014. In August 2015, the Crafts received a Queensland Heritage Award from the National Trust for their conservation of the theatre.

Approximately 130 rural picture theatres/shows were listed in the Queensland Post Office Directory for 1930–31, and this list was not exhaustive. A recent survey of rural theatres conducted by Griffith University revealed that few 1920s cinemas were still operating in regional Queensland. Surviving theatres included the Majestic Theatre at Pomona (erected 1921 – seats 300); the Astor Theatre at Surat (1925 – seats 150); the Majestic Picture Theatre at Malanda (1926 – seats 300); the Radio at Barcaldine (1926 – seats 550) and the Airdome at Innisfail (1928 – seats 760).

== Description ==
The Paragon Theatre is a large timber building with a masonry facade prominently located on Churchill Street in Childers. The rear section of the building is a large shed-like form clad in unpainted timber weatherboards with a pitched, galvanised iron roof. The side walls have high level louvred openings under the eaves and timber framed windows in the lower section of the wall.

The parapeted facade is composed of face brick pilasters which divide the surface into three bays rendered with roughcast stucco. The parapet edge features a rectangular signage block flanked by a masonry balustrade. Three sets of timber casement windows are located in the upper sections of each of the bays. The glass of the windows has been painted and each set of windows is surmounted by horizontal awnings with small hipped roofs and supported by timber brackets. The upper section of the facade is painted in a dark chocolate brown.

A large awning projects from the surface of the facade, supported by iron tie-backs. The horizontal awning features a centrally located shallow arch which defines the entrance. Raised lettering on the front of the awning spelling "PARAGON" is located on the arch. The entrance is via concrete steps to four pairs of folding glass and timber doors. Tapered pylons abutting the wall surface flank the entrance doors and support another arch over the doorway. The pylons, archway and trim on the awning are all painted in bright red with the remainder of the lower facade painted in dark green. Two shop fronts are situated at the corners of the front facade. The entry area has also been sub- divided with a lightweight partition in order to create a sub-tenancy. These three shopfront areas are currently unoccupied. The original ticket office and small foyer area are located to the eastern side of the entry.

Internally the theatre retains many of its early features, including seating, timber fretwork and lattice, light fittings and some balustrading. The ceiling and most of the side walls are covered with timber lattice mounted on timber posts, that stops just above the level of the exit doors in the side walls. The bottom edge of the lattice is finished with shallow arches trimmed with a double stripe painted in black. At the top of the side walls is a broad band of decoration achieved by picking out a pattern within the lattice with black paint.

The screen is covered with long curtains and is surrounded with fibro- cement panelling that frames the screen, now covering the proscenium. The orchestra pit has also been boarded over. Most of the ground floor seating consists of canvas, deckchair-type seating with one row of tip-up seating located against the back wall. The balcony upstairs has a raked, stepped timber floor, with each row of seats occupying a different level. The seating in the front three rows is timber and upholstered fixed seating, there are then two rows of canvas seats and a final row of "dress circle" seating at the back. The projection box if located at the rear of the balcony in a space enclosed with fibro- cement panelling.

A small timber residence is connected to the rear of the building and appears to be unoccupied. There is also a galvanised iron shed and timber tankstand and tank adjacent to this small house.

== Heritage listing ==
Paragon Theatre was listed on the Queensland Heritage Register on 28 April 2000 having satisfied the following criteria.

The place is important in demonstrating the evolution or pattern of Queensland's history.

The Paragon Theatre, constructed in 1927, is one of the oldest picture theatres still operating in Queensland and is important an illustrating a significant aspect of the pattern of this state's history, namely, the expansion of popular entertainment in Queensland in the interwar period. In particular, the construction and continued operation of the Paragon Theatre illustrates the vital and substantive role of independent film exhibition in rural Queensland.

The place demonstrates rare, uncommon or endangered aspects of Queensland's cultural heritage.

The Paragon Theatre is a rare surviving 1920s Queensland regional theatre which still functions as a cinema, and is important in demonstrating an aspect of Queensland's cultural heritage which is no longer common.

The place is important in demonstrating the principal characteristics of a particular class of cultural places.

The building is an example of 1920s regional picture theatre architecture adapted to the Queensland climate. It is an intact 1920s cinema which reveals important information about picture theatre design in Queensland during a formative period. The intactness of the interior in particular offers present and future generations an understanding of the experience of cinema viewing in a rural Queensland picture theatre of the interwar era.

The place is important because of its aesthetic significance.

The Paragon Theatre, located prominently fronting the main street of Childers, has a distinctive facade which makes a major contribution to an exceptional streetscape of buildings in Churchill Street (Bruce Highway), Childers. In this it has aesthetic significance.

The place has a strong or special association with a particular community or cultural group for social, cultural or spiritual reasons.

The theatre was a focal point of social life in the Childers/Isis district from the late 1920s until well into the 1969s, and has a strong association for the local community with popular entertainment and movie-going in the period before the ready availability of television and videotape players.
