= Ballaroo, Queensland =

Ballaroo
- Suburb
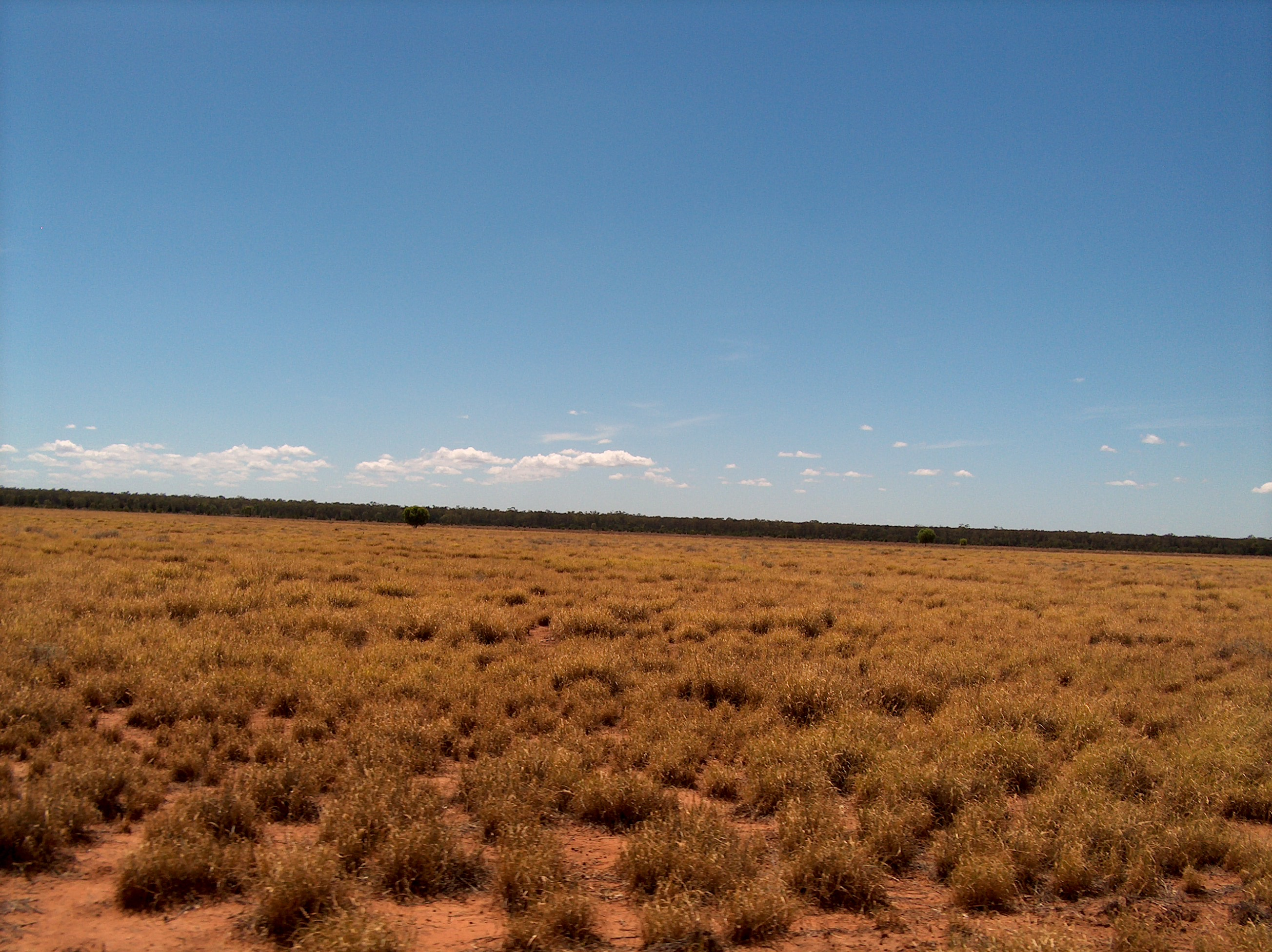
- Ballaroo landscape

- Interactive map of Ballaroo
- Coordinates: 27.1144°S 148.6222°E
- Country: Australia
- State: Queensland
- LGA: Maranoa Region
- Location: 72.2 km (44.9 mi) SSW of Roma; 295 km (183 mi) W of Dalby; 377 km (234 mi) W of Toowoomba; 505 km (314 mi) W of Brisbane

Government
  - State electorate: Warrego
  - Federal division: Maranoa

Area
  - Total: 1,786.5 km^{2} (689.8 sq mi)

Population
  - Total: 51 (2021 census)
  - Density: 0.02855/km^{2} (0.0739/sq mi)
- Time zone: UTC+10:00 (AEST)
- Postcode: 4455
Suburbs around Ballaroo
Dunkeld	Mount Abundance	Tingun
Dunkeld	Ballaroo	Oberina
Begonia	Wycombe	Weribone; Wellesley

Ballaroo is a semi-arid rural locality in the Maranoa Region, Queensland, Australia. In the 2021 census, Ballaroo had a population of 51 people.

== Geography ==
The Cogoon River (Muckadilla Creek) flows, most often with little flow, through the locality from the north (Mount Abundance) to the south-east (Weribone) where it becomes a tributary of the Balonne River.

Mount First View is in the centre of the locality (27.0875°S 148.5572°E) rising to 326 metres (1,070 ft) above sea level. It was named on 3 May 1846 by the New South Wales Surveyor General, Sir Thomas Livingstone Mitchell.

== History ==
The colonial surveyor-general Thomas Mitchell and party followed the Cogoon River from the Balonne to Mount Abundance, when passing through this area in 1846.

== Demographics ==
In the 2016 census, Ballaroo had a population of 41 people.

In the 2021 census, Ballaroo had a population of 51 people.

== Education ==
There are no schools in Ballaroo. The nearest government primary schools are:

- Dunkeld State School in neighbouring Dunkeld to the west
- Roma State College in Roma to the north
- Surat State School in Surat to the east
- Begonia State School in neighbouring Begonia to the south-west

The nearest government secondary school is Roma State College in Roma, but it is too distant from some parts of Ballarroo that distance education and boarding school would be other options.
