= Astor Theatre =

Astor Theatre or Astor Cinema can refer to:

== Australia ==
- Astor Theatre, Melbourne, Victoria
- Astor Theatre, Perth, Western Australia
- Astor Theatre, Surat, Queensland
- Astor Cinema, Sydney, New South Wales

== United States ==
- Astor Place Theatre, off-Broadway, New York City
- Astor Theatre, New York City, on Broadway, New York City
- Dixie Center for the Arts, formerly the Astor in Ruston, Louisiana

== See also ==
- Astor (disambiguation)
