= Asther =

Asther is a surname. Notable people with the surname include:

- Gunnar Asther (1892–1974), Swedish sailor
- Nils Asther (1897–1981), Swedish actor

== See also ==
- Aster (name)
