= Oberina, Queensland =

Oberina
- Suburb
- Interactive map of Oberina
- Coordinates: 27.0133°S 148.8861°E
- Country: Australia
- State: Queensland
- LGA: Maranoa Region
- Location: 27.9 km (17.3 mi) NW of Surat; 55.1 km (34.2 mi) S of Roma; 348 km (216 mi) W of Toowoomba; 475 km (295 mi) W of Brisbane

Government
  - State electorate: Warrego
  - Federal division: Maranoa

Area
  - Total: 376.4 km^{2} (145.3 sq mi)

Population
  - Total: 31 (2021 census)
  - Density: 0.0824/km^{2} (0.213/sq mi)
- Time zone: UTC+10:00 (AEST)
- Postcode: 4417
Suburbs around Oberina
Tingun	Tingun	Tingun
Ballaroo	Oberina	Noorindoo
Ballaroo	Weribone	Noorindoo

Oberina is a rural locality in the Maranoa Region, Queensland, Australia. In the 2021 census, Oberina had a population of 31 people.

== Geography ==
Yalebone State Forest 2 is in the north-east of the locality. Apart from this protected area, the land use is mostly grazing on native vegetation with some crop growing.

== Demographics ==
In the 2016 census, Oberina had a population of 17 people.

In the 2021 census, Oberina had a population of 31 people.

== Education ==
There are no schools in Oberina. The nearest government school is Surat State School (Prep to Year 10) in Surat to the south-east. The nearest government school providing education to Year 12 is Roma State College in Roma to the north, but it might to be too distant for a daily commute for students in southern Oberina; the alternatives are distance education and boarding school.
