= Warroo Shire Hall =

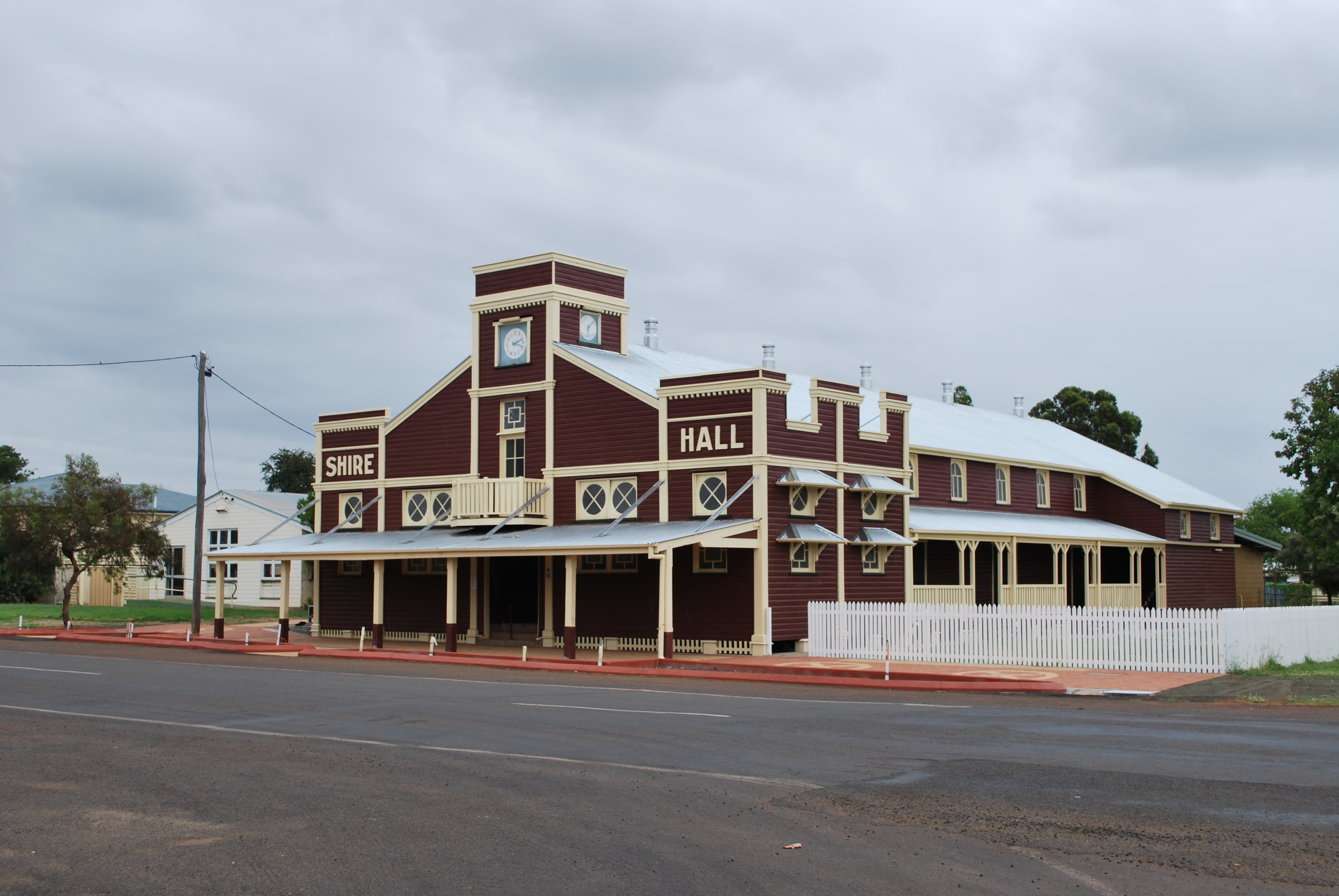
- Warroo Shire Hall, 2008

- Location within Queensland Location within Australia
- 27.1534°S 149.0674°E
- Location: cnr Cordelia & William Streets, Surat, Maranoa Region, Queensland, Australia

Site notes
- Architect: Harry Marks

Queensland Heritage Register
- Official name: Warroo Shire Hall
- Type: state heritage (built)
- Designated: 8 May 2007
- Reference no.: 602612
- Significant period: 1929-
- Builders: K O'Brien and C Turnbull

Warroo Shire Hall is a heritage-listed town hall at cnr Cordelia & William Streets, Surat, Maranoa Region, Queensland, Australia. It was designed by Harry Marks and was built in 1929 by K O'Brien and C Turnbull. It was added to the Queensland Heritage Register on 8 May 2007.

== History ==
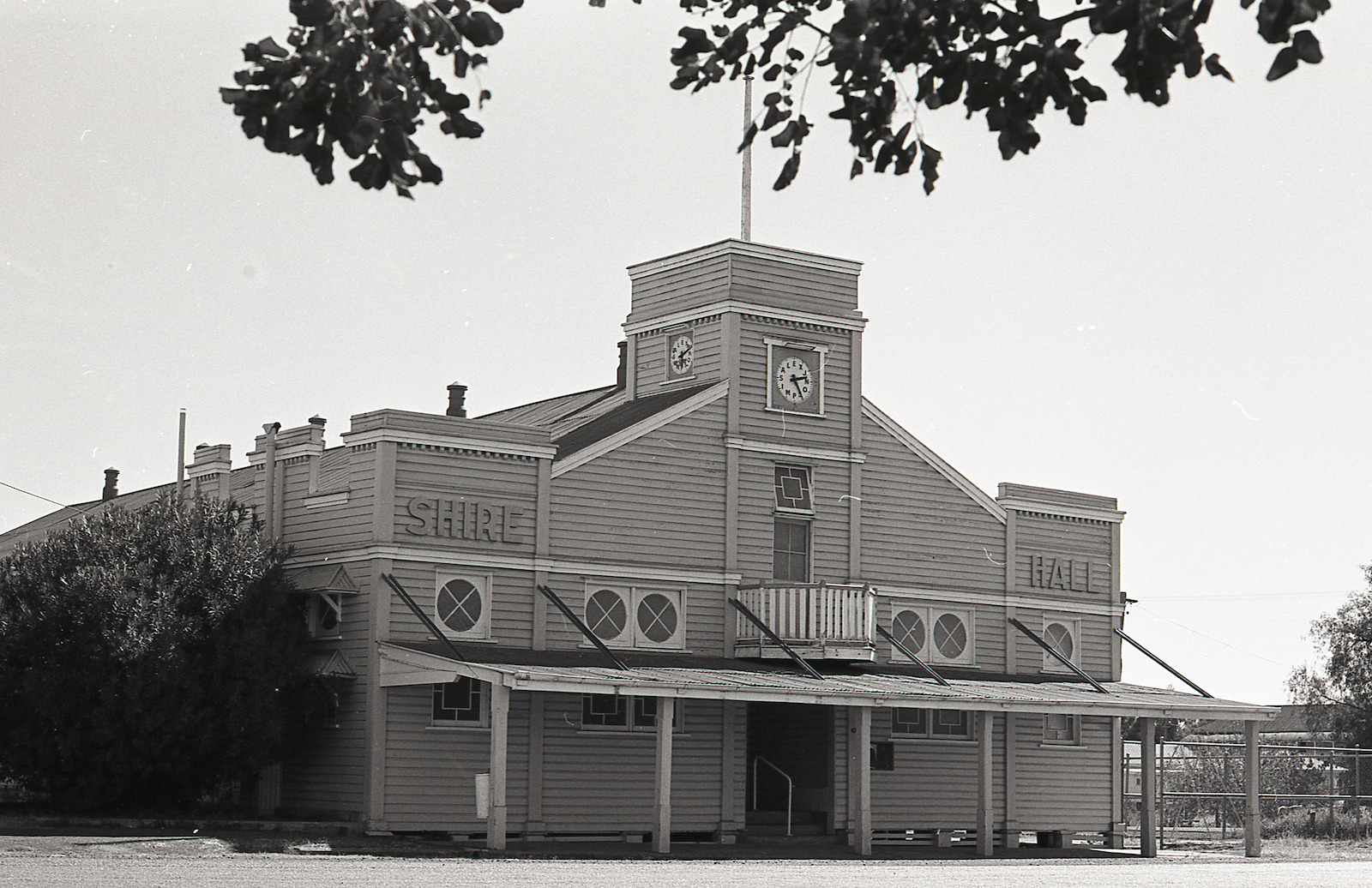
Warroo Shire Hall in 1975.

The Warroo Shire Hall was built in 1929 in Surat as an administrative and social centre. Surat is situated on the Balonne River some 80 kilometres (50 mi) south of Roma and was the administrative hub of the Warroo Shire until 2008 when the shire was amalgamated into Maranoa Region.

The Surveyor-General of New South Wales, Thomas Mitchell, mapped the area in 1846 and the District of Maranoa was proclaimed in November 1848. The new Commissioner of Lands arrived with several police in 1849 and set up camp on Yambougal station, moving slightly up river a few months later. This was the site selected in 1849 by surveyor James Burrowes for a service township on the Balonne River. He called the township Surat, after his former home in Madras, India.

A Court of Petty Sessions at Surat was gazetted in 1850 and a police building was erected. The Lands and Post Offices were soon represented and in 1859 a hotel was built. By the time that the town site was surveyed for land sales in 1863, a number of buildings had already been erected. Although Surat was superseded by St George as an administrative centre for the district in 1865, it continued to serve the surrounding area, which became Warroo Shire. Surat gained a school in 1874 and its first church in the late 1870s. In 1879 Cobb and Co set up a coach service from St George to Surat and on to Yuleba, constructing a staging post and store at Surat. This service was run until 1924, when it was the last coach route to be run in Australia.

The site of the shire hall was acquired in 1882 by the Warroo Divisional Board. Tenders were called for the construction of a simple building, which was extended over the years. In 1903, the Divisional Board became Warroo Shire Council. In 1920 a second small building was constructed on the site as council offices. This building was later removed. The current hall was constructed in 1929 by builders K O'Brien and C Turnbull to the design of Harry Marks of the firm of Harry J Marks & Son of Toowoomba.

James Marks, who arrived from England in 1866, founded the firm. He moved to Toowoomba in 1874, working as a contractor before setting up an architectural practice in 1880. In the late 1880s his eldest son, Henry James (Harry) joined the firm to train with his father. In 1892 the firm became James Marks & Son. The office designed a wide range of residential, institutional and commercial buildings. Harry's brother Reginald joined the practice in 1906 when James retired. Harry's son Charles also worked in the practice, though he joined the Defence Forces in 1915. In 1917 Reginald moved to Sydney. When Charles joined the practice in 1924, it became Harry J Marks and Son.

Harry Marks was an innovative and idiosyncratic designer who introduced a number of his inventions into buildings he designed, including the patented Austral window. On a number of occasions Marks designed windows especially for a commissioned building and the windows in the Warroo hall are a distinctive feature of the design. They pivot to improve ventilation, a particular interest of Marks'.

The building was officially opened on Friday 7 March 1930 by the Federal Member for Maranoa, James Hunter, having been funded by a £4,000 loan from the Queensland Government, the first time the shire had borrowed funds.

The new building combined offices and a meeting room for the Shire Council with a large open hall to be used for a variety of public and private functions and events and which contained a stage and projection booth.

Surat was connected to a reticulated water system in 1952 and electricity was laid on in 1953. The three clock faces in the tower are a memorial to Alex J Simpson who was Chairman of Warroo Shire from 1925 to 1946 and who was killed in a car accident in 1947. On each clock face, the letters of his name replace the usual numerals. The clock was officially unveiled on Saturday 3 April 1954. It was decided to illuminate them in 1961.

The original hall was retained on site as a supper room, at first alongside the new hall, then to its rear, before being destroyed by a storm in 1962. A new civic centre was constructed in 1963 and the Shire Council has since used this venue for its meetings and offices. The hall continues in community use and has a new supper room, constructed in 1961, to its southern side. This building has no heritage significance, nor does the modern toilet block constructed to the rear of the hall.

The hall is very intact and appears to have been painted in a version of the existing colour scheme since at least 1955.

Part of the northern verandah has been enclosed and fitted with a small kitchenette, probably in the 1960s. This may be the 'Gentlemen's Dressing Room' referred to as being fitted with casement windows in 1957.

The former Council Meeting Room and Shire Offices are currently used for community craft activities.

== Description ==
The Warroo Shire hall is located prominently on the corner of two major streets in the centre of Surat. It is a rectangular timber building with its long axis at right angles to the street. It is set on low stumps and has a gabled roof clad with corrugated iron sheeting and ventilators along the roof ridge. There is an awning supported on plain timber posts to the pavement and recessed verandahs along both sides.

The front (eastern) elevation has a square central clock tower with clock faces to the north, south and eastern sides. Letters spelling out "Alex J Simpson" have replaced the numerals. Below the clock is a square window and a small balcony jutting out over the street awning.

The windows form a distinctive decorative feature of the building, being square, circular or arched with unusual glazing patterns and decoratively placed glazing bars. A 1930 photograph of the shire offices shows the square windows opening on a central, horizontal pivot. They can no longer be opened, but the hall windows are still operational. The windows to the sides of the offices at the front have individual sun hoods.

The front entrance is recessed and opens onto a short hallway between two large square rooms. The projection room is over the hall and is accessed by a staircase inside the hall. The large hall is lined with fibrous cement sheeting and triangular brackets between high-level windows support the roof. The windows have round arched tops and open on central pivots. The floor is timber and there is a stage flanked by dressing rooms to the rear.

The separate supper room is a simple rectangular timber building with a gabled roof clad in corrugated iron. It runs parallel to the hall and is linked to it by a covered way and a courtyard area. It contains a dining area, kitchenette and a small bar to the rear.

There is a block of masonry toilets to the rear of the hall. A high fence of tubular metal posts and metal mesh surrounds the site.

== Heritage listing ==
Warroo Shire Hall was listed on the Queensland Heritage Register on 8 May 2007 having satisfied the following criteria.

The place is important in demonstrating the evolution or pattern of Queensland's history.

The Warroo Shire Hall demonstrates the way in which much of western Queensland was settled by means of small service towns on supply routes. They provided a scattered population with essential goods and services, administrative facilities and the social structure to develop a sense of community. The Warroo hall provided a meeting place for the Shire Council and a venue for formal and informal social events and still serves the community.

The place demonstrates rare, uncommon or endangered aspects of Queensland's cultural heritage.

The Warroo Shire Hall is a rare and intact surviving timber shire hall, of which many were constructed, but few now survive.

The place is important in demonstrating the principal characteristics of a particular class of cultural places.

The Warroo Shire Hall is a fine and intact example of a timber shire hall of its era, catering for both administrative and social functions in its design. It has rooms for shire offices, with a large hall, stage, projection booth and small kitchen to the rear. Its toilets and separate supper room are now modern structures.

The place is important because of its aesthetic significance.

The Warroo Shire Hall is an important public building in a prominent location and in form, scale and materials makes a strong visual contribution to the townscape and character of Surat. Its central clock tower forms an important part of its landmark quality.

The place has a strong or special association with a particular community or cultural group for social, cultural or spiritual reasons.

The Warroo Shire Hall has a long connection with the people of Surat and the surrounding district as a focus for a range of important community services and social events. These have been as varied as wedding receptions and professional concerts by visiting performers.

The place has a special association with the life or work of a particular person, group or organisation of importance in Queensland's history.

The Warroo Shire hall was designed by H J (Harry) Marks and is associated with his life and work as a member of the important Toowoomba architectural practice which encompassed the work of three generations of the Marks family.
