= Astore =

Astore may refer to:

- Astore District, a district in Gilgit Baltistan, northern Pakistan
- Astore (city), the capital of the Astore District
- Astore River, a tributary of the Indus River, running through Astore Valley
- Astore Valley, in Astore District
- Italian ship Astore, several ships with the name

== See also ==
- Astor (disambiguation)
