= Begonia, Queensland =

Begonia
- Suburb
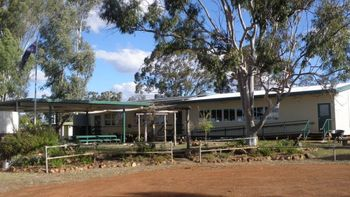
- Begonia State School, 2023

- Interactive map of Begonia
- Coordinates: 27.4602°S 148.2741°E
- Country: Australia
- State: Queensland
- LGA: Maranoa Region
- Location: 73.4 km (45.6 mi) NNW of St George; 179 km (111 mi) SW of Roma; 440 km (270 mi) W of Toowoomba; 570 km (350 mi) W of Brisbane

Government
  - State electorate: Warrego
  - Federal division: Maranoa

Area
  - Total: 1,668.5 km^{2} (644.2 sq mi)

Population
  - Total: 48 (2021 census)
  - Density: 0.02877/km^{2} (0.0745/sq mi)
- Time zone: UTC+10:00 (AEST)
- Postcode: 4487
Suburbs around Begonia
Dunkeld	Dunkeld	Ballaroo
Bindebango	Begonia	Wycombe
St George	St George	St George

Begonia is a rural locality in the Maranoa Region, Queensland, Australia. In the 2021 census, Begonia had a population of 48 people.

== Geography ==
The Maranoa River enters the locality from the north-west (Dunkeld) and flows south-east through the locality, exiting to the south-east (St George), where it becomes a tributary of the Balonne River, part of the Murray–Darling basin.

The Mitchell-St George Road enters the locality from the north-west (Dunkeld) and exits to the south-east (St George).

The land use is predominantly grazing on native vegetation with small areas of crop growing.

== History ==
Begonia State School opened on 25 January 1970.

== Demographics ==
In the 2016 census Begonia had a population of 50 people.

In the 2021 census, Begonia had a population of 48 people.

== Education ==
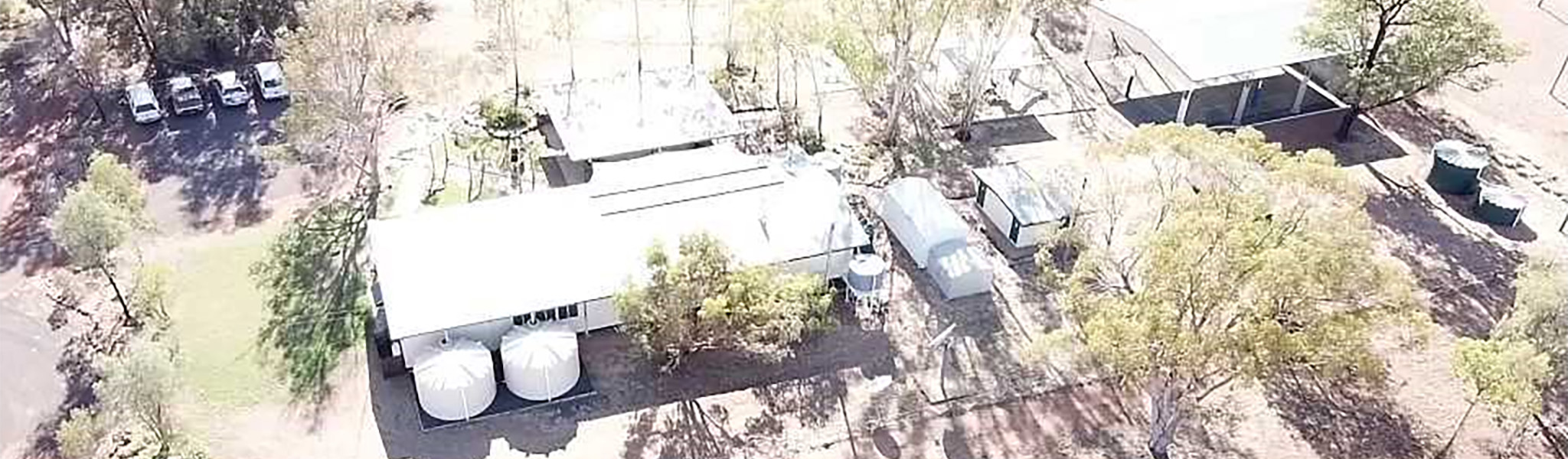
Begonia State School, aerial view, 2019

Begonia State School is a government primary (Prep-6) school for boys and girls on Begonia Road off Mitchell St George Road (27.4917°S 148.3249°E). In 2016, the school had an enrolment of 14 students with 3 teachers (1 full-time equivalent) and 4 non-teaching staff (1 full-time equivalent). In 2018, the school had an enrolment of 13 students with 2 teachers (1 full-time equivalent) and 4 non-teaching staff (2 full-time equivalent).

There are no nearby schools providing secondary education. The alternatives are distance education and boarding school.
