= Aster (venture capital company) =

- Industry: Venture capital
- Founded: 2010
- Headquarters: Paris, France
- Key people: Jean-Marc Bally
- Website: www.aster.it/tiki-index.php?page=HomePage_en

Aster is a venture capital company specialised in the energy, manufacturing, and mobility sectors. Founded in 2010, it has operations in Paris, San Francisco, Beijing, and Tel Aviv. Aster manages more than €500 million in assets and investments in Europe, North America, and China. The company is headed by Jean-Marc Bally.

== History ==
=== Origin ===
Aster was born out of Schneider Electric Ventures, created in 2000. In January 2010, Schneider Electric joined forces with Alstom to launch a Paris-based Aster fund. Initially funded with €70 million (including €40 million contributed by Schneider Electric and €30 million by Alstom), the fund focuses on supporting the development of innovative start-ups in the fields of energy, green tech, innovative materials, intelligent transport systems, and the Internet of Things. The formation of Aster responds to Schneider Electric and Alstom's desire to detect resources and talent beyond the two groups, from an open innovation standpoint, in order to identify future markets. It's one of the first "multi-corporate" funds (with multiple companies as investors) on a global scale. Among the investments by Schneider Electric Ventures are CPower, offering solutions to optimise energy consumption, purchased in September 2010 by the US energy company Constellation Energy; Netasq, specialising in network security software, purchased in October 2012 by EADS; ConnectBlue, a wireless technology provider, purchased by the Swiss company U-blox in 2014; and Solaire Direct, a solar energy producer, purchased by Engie in July 2015.

=== 2010 ===
In November 2010, Aster made its first investment, as part of a €500,000 round of funding, in the start-up Optiréno, which specialises in the energy renovation of buildings.

=== 2011 ===
In February 2011, the chemical industry group Rhodia, which became a subsidiary of Solvay Group in September 2011, joined Aster, and the fund reached €85 million. In June 2011, Aster invested $3 million in Ioxus, a company specialising in high-end supercapacitors for the automotive industry. Also in June 2011, Aster invested €2.5 million in Avantium, which manufactures plant-based plastics. The 2011 rankings by the Observatoire des PME Finance ranked Aster as 3rd place among investment capital groups.

=== 2012 ===
In 2012, Aster invested €4 million in SolarFuel, which specialises in the conversion of carbon dioxide into HyGas "green" methane gas. In July 2012, Aster increased the capital of Lucibel, which specialises in LEDs (a Li-Fi solution), by injecting €1.5 million. In October 2012, Aster invested €2 million in EcoFactor, a California start-up specialising in energy-saving software.

In November 2012, the European Investment Fund (EIF) contributed €20 million to the Aster fund. This investment gave Aster a total of €105 million. According to the business newspaper Les Echos, this was the first investment by an institutional player in France's risk capital market .

According to an assessment by the AFIC Cleantech Club fundraising barometer, Aster was the third largest French investment fund investing in cleantech companies in 2012.

=== 2013 ===
In January 2013, Aster invested in Building IQ, which specialises in energy efficiency software. In November 2013, after already being invested in EcoFactor's capital, Aster took part in a second round of fundraising with $10 million. In 2013, Aster invested $3 million in Atlantium, an Israeli start-up specialising in water treatment. Ioxus raised a $15 million C from investors including Aster, the Westly Group, Northwater Capital Management, Braemar Energy Ventures and Energy Technology Ventures.

According to Jean-Marc Bally, Aster evaluated 1,500 start-up files in 2013.

=== 2014 ===
Lucibel raised €15 million in January 2014, with €3.5 million contributed by Aster. The purpose of this new round of funds was to develop the company's external growth. In January 2014, the Lyon start-up The CosMo Company, which specialises in modeling and simulating complex systems, raised €3.8 million, allowing it to export to the United States. In March 2014, Aster took part in raising $10 million for Iceotope. On 15 July 2014, Lucibel was listed on the stock market, with Aster's support. In November 2014, Aster invested in Digital Lumens, which specialises in smart LED lights, for a fourth round of funding, for a total of €23 million. Finally, in September 2014, Easybike raised €6.5 million through Aster, Sigma Gestion, and Business Angels, in order to accelerate its development.

=== 2015 ===
In March 2015, Schneider Electric and five partners (AFD, Proparco, BEI, OFID, and CDC [UK]) launched the Energy Access Ventures fund with a budget of €54.5 million. The fund, managed by Aster, was created to finance small- and medium-sized enterprises in order to accelerate access to electricity in Africa.

=== 2016 ===
In January 2016, Aster and Alter Equity 3P partners with ECO GTB to raise €2.3 million to boost the growth of the company, which specialises in outsourced management services for building facilities. Alongside HSBC Ventures, Aster invested in the capital of Customer Matrix, which specialises in data analysis. Alongside HSBC Ventures, Aster invested in the capital of Customer Matrix, which specialises in data analysis. In February 2016, Aster took part in the third round of funding, raising €8 million for the US start-up EnTouch Controls, which specialises in energy management for buildings. In September 2016, FINALCAD raised €20 million through Aster, Serena Capital, and CapHorn Invest. The goal of the combined funds was to accelerate the growth of the leader in construction digital transformation. In October 2016, OpenDataSoft raised €5,4 million through a second round of funding through Aster and Salesforce Venture. The start-up, which specialises in data harvesting and analysis, opened offices in Boston in 2016 to accelerate its development in the United States.

=== 2017 ===
In January 2017, ekWateur, a collaborative energy supplier in France, wrapped up a first round of funding with €2 million from Aster, BNP Paribas Développement, and Bouygues Telecom Initiatives. EkWateur aims to have 500,000 customers in 2022.

In November 2017, Aster raises 240 million euros, bringing all its funds to 500 million euros to support startups in the fields of energy, mobility and industry.

=== 2018 ===
Aster participates in Habiteo's €6 million fundraising in November 2017, a French startup that supplies real estate developers with a 3D visualization tool.

In January 2018, Aster invests in Element Analytics, specialized in industrial data analysis.

In February 2018, Aster led the EUR 1.5 million fundraising round of DCbrain, which develops network optimization solutions.
