= Wycombe, Queensland =

Wycombe
- Suburb
- Interactive map of Wycombe
- Coordinates: 27.5102°S 148.615°E
- Country: Australia
- State: Queensland
- LGA: Maranoa Region
- Location: 69.2 km (43.0 mi) N of St George; 162 km (101 mi) S of Roma; 401 km (249 mi) W of Toowoomba; 529 km (329 mi) W of Brisbane

Government
  - State electorate: Warrego
  - Federal division: Maranoa

Area
  - Total: 975.5 km^{2} (376.6 sq mi)

Population
  - Total: 39 (2021 census)
  - Density: 0.0400/km^{2} (0.1035/sq mi)
- Time zone: UTC+10:00 (AEST)
- Postcode: 4455
Suburbs around Wycombe
Begonia	Ballaroo	Ballaroo
Begonia	Wycombe	Wellesley
St George	St George	St George

Wycombe is a rural locality in the Maranoa Region, Queensland, Australia. In the 2021 census, Wycombe had a population of 39 people.

== History ==
The locality name derives from a pastoral run name, named by pastoralist John Beckett after his birthplace in High Wycombe, Buckinghamshire, England.

Whycombe Provisional School and Waroo Provisional School both opened in 1902 as a half-time provisional schools in conjunction (meaning the schools shared a single teacher). Whycombe Provisional School closed in 1907 and Warroo Provisional School became a full-time school, but then closed too circa 1910.

Wycombe State School opened on 26 February 1979 on Dilqui Road (27.5501°S 148.6206°E). It was mothballed on 31 December 2008 and closed on 31 December 2009. The school's website was archived.

== Demographics ==
In the 2016 census, Wycombe had a population of 36 people.

In the 2021 census, Wycombe had a population of 39 people.

== Education ==
There are no schools in Wycombe. The nearest government primary school is Begonia State School in neighbouring Begonia to the west. The nearest government secondary school is St George State High School in neighbouring St George to the south, but the distances involved are sufficiently large that distance education and boarding school are other alternatives.
