= Astor Hotel (disambiguation) =

Astor Hotel usually refers to the Hotel Astor in New York City.

Astor Hotel or Hotel Astor may also refer to:

- Astor on the Lake, also known as Astor Hotel, Milwaukee, Wisconsin, United States
- Astor Hotel, Adelaide, Australia
- John Jacob Astor Hotel, originally Hotel Astoria, Oregon, United States

== See also ==
- Astor (disambiguation)
- Astor House, a former hotel in New York City, built in 1836 and razed 1926
- Astor House (Golden, Colorado), a hotel built 1867, now a museum
- Astor House Hotel (Shanghai), Shanghai, established 1846
- Astoria Hotel (disambiguation), several hotels
