= Weribone, Queensland =

Weribone
- Suburb
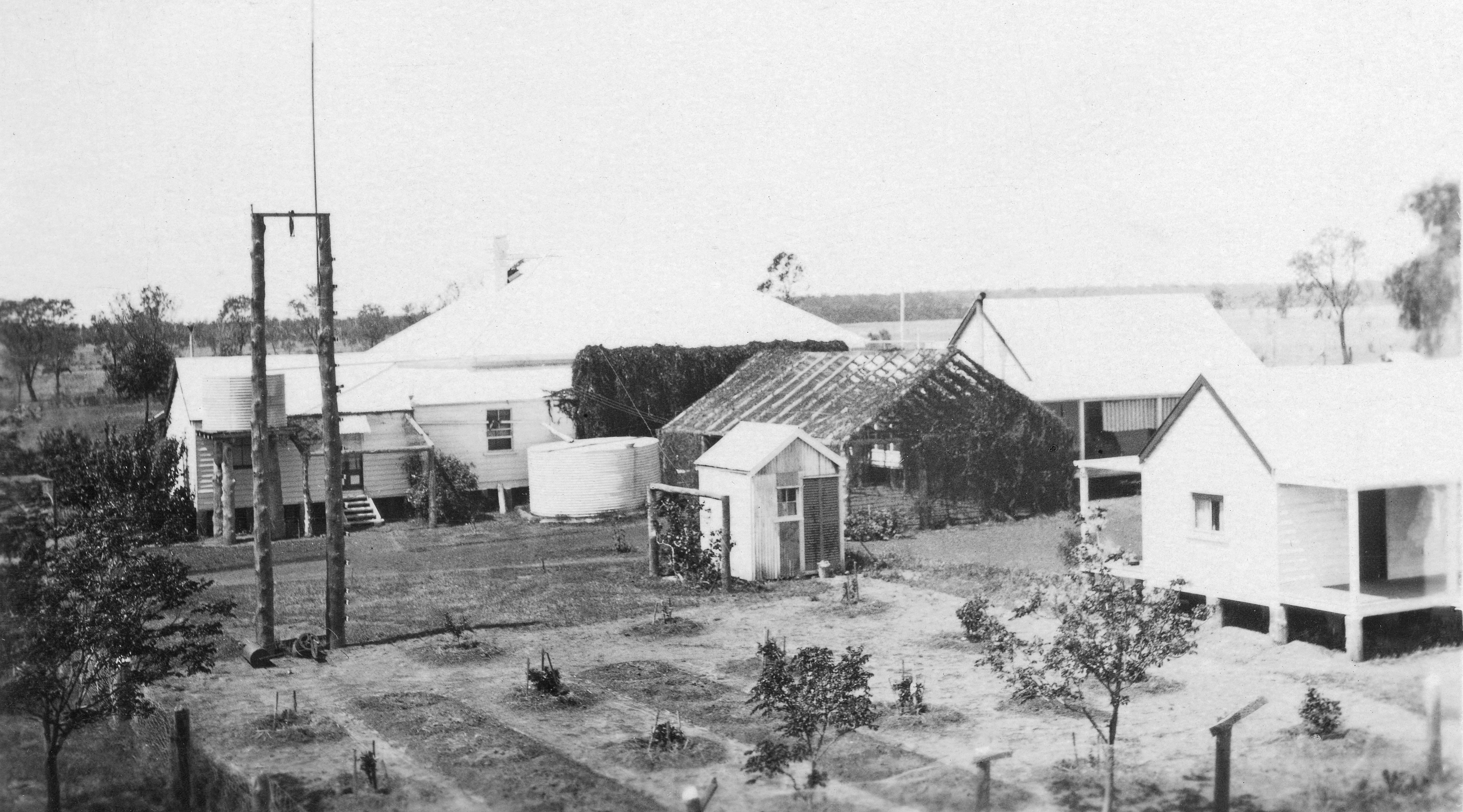
- Weribone station homestead, 1929

- Interactive map of Weribone
- Coordinates: 27.2038°S 148.8822°E
- Country: Australia
- State: Queensland
- LGA: Maranoa Region
- Location: 31.1 km (19.3 mi) SW of Surat; 108 km (67 mi) S of Roma; 351 km (218 mi) W of Toowoomba; 478 km (297 mi) W of Brisbane

Government
  - State electorate: Warrego
  - Federal division: Maranoa

Area
  - Total: 362.1 km^{2} (139.8 sq mi)

Population
  - Total: 14 (2021 census)
  - Density: 0.0387/km^{2} (0.100/sq mi)
- Time zone: UTC+10:00 (AEST)
- Postcode: 4417
Suburbs around Weribone
| Ballaroo | Oberina | Noorindoo |
| Ballaroo | Weribone | Surat |
| Ballaroo | Wellesley | Wellesley |

Weribone is a rural locality in the Maranoa Region, Queensland, Australia. In the 2021 census, Weribone had a population of 14 people.

== Geography ==
The Carnarvon Highway enters the locality from the north-east (Noorindoo) and forms part of the north-eastern boundary of the locality before exiting to the east (Surat).

The Balonne River enters the locality from the north-east (Noorindoo / Surat) and then forms the eastern and south-eastern boundaries of the locality, before exiting to the south (Ballaroo / Wellesley).

The Colgoon State Forest is in the north-west of the locality. Apart from this protected area, the land use is predominantly grazing on native vegetation with some crop growing (mostly in the north of the locality).

== Demographics ==
In the 2016 census, Weribone had a population of 18 people.

In the 2021 census, Weribone had a population of 14 people.

== Education ==
There are no schools in Weribone. The nearest government primary and secondary school is Surat State School (to Year 10) in neighbouring Surat to the east. There are no nearby schools providing education to Year 12; the alternatives are distance education and boarding school.

== Amenities ==
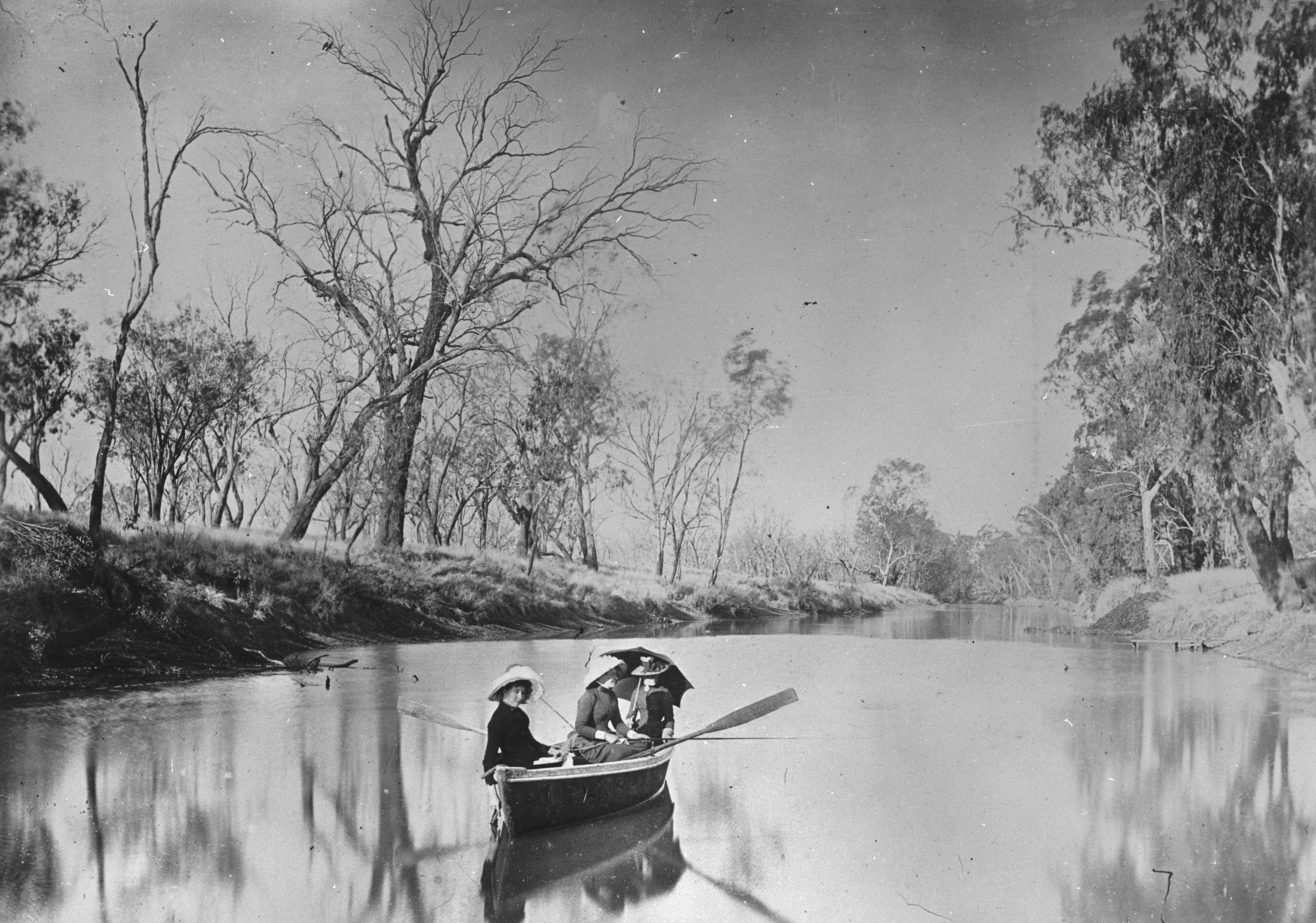
Women from Weribone pastoral station in a boat

There is a boat ramp and pontoon on the north bank of Balonne River, just off the Carnarvon Highway (27.1499°S 149.0727°E). It is managed by the Maranoa Regional Council.
