= Wellesley, Queensland =

Wellesley
- Suburb
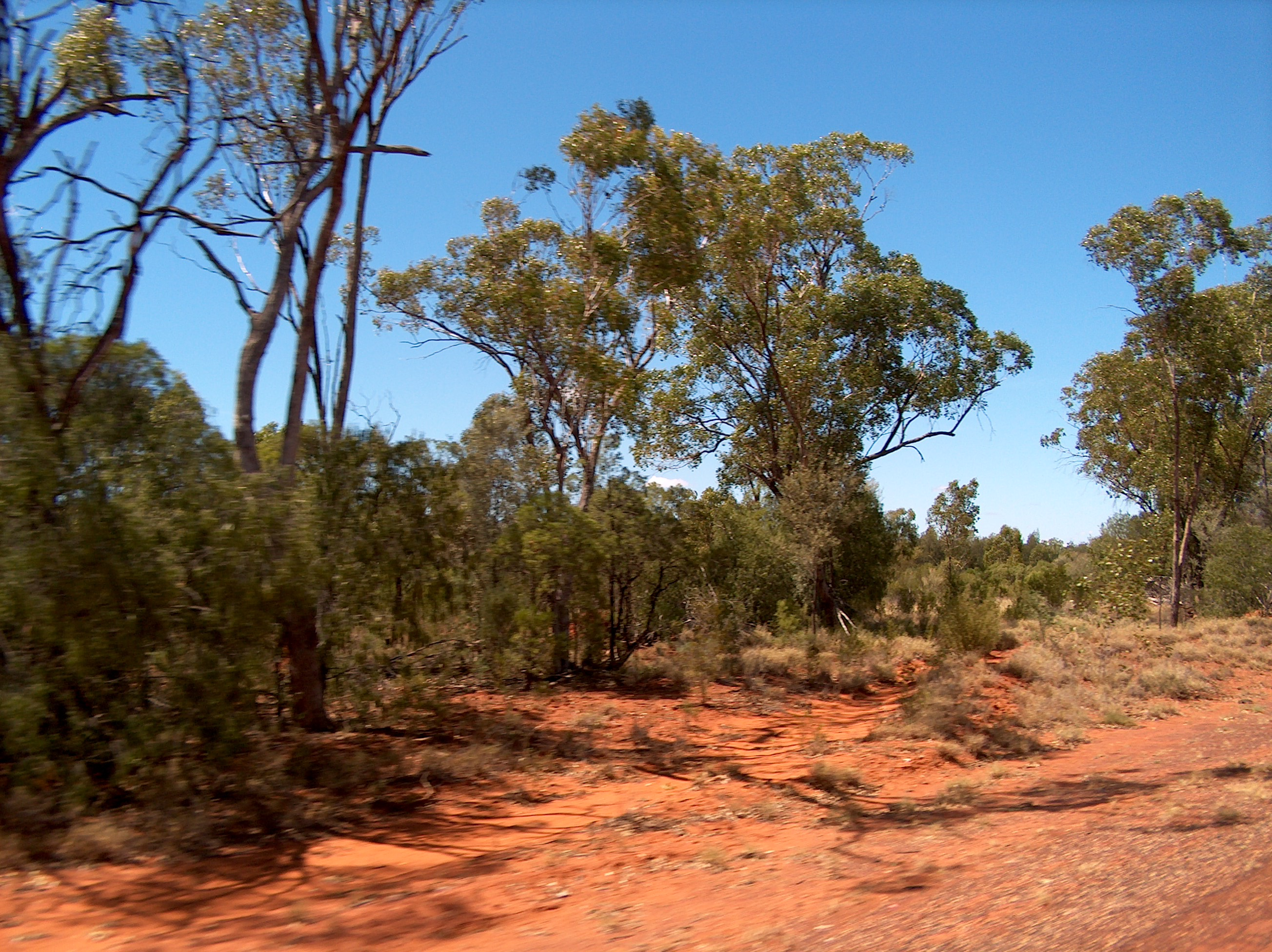
- Landscape near the Carnarvon Highway, Wellesley, 2005

- Interactive map of Wellesley
- Coordinates: 27.3972°S 148.9041°E
- Country: Australia
- State: Queensland
- LGA: Maranoa Region
- Location: 30.1 km (18.7 mi) SW of Surat; 86.3 km (53.6 mi) NE of St George; 110 km (68 mi) S of Roma; 348 km (216 mi) W of Toowoomba; 546 km (339 mi) W of Brisbane

Government
  - State electorate: Warrego
  - Federal division: Maranoa

Area
  - Total: 1,110.3 km^{2} (428.7 sq mi)

Population
  - Total: 94 (2021 census)
  - Density: 0.0847/km^{2} (0.2193/sq mi)
- Time zone: UTC+10:00 (AEST)
- Postcode: 4417
Suburbs around Wellesley
Weribone	Surat	Noorindoo
Ballaroo	Wellesley	Parknook
Wycombe	St George	St George

Wellesley is a rural locality in the Maranoa Region, Queensland, Australia. In the 2021 census, Wellesley had a population of 94 people.

== Geography ==
The Carnarvon Highway runs through from south to north.

The land use is predominantly growing crops in the north of the locality and grazing on native vegetation in the south of the locality.

== Demographics ==
In the 2016 census, Wellesley had a population of 73 people.

In the 2021 census, Wellesley had a population of 94 people.

== Education ==
There are no schools in Wellesley. The nearest government school is Surat State School in neighbouring Surat to the north-east which provides education from Prep to Year 10. There are no nearby schools providing education to Year 12; distance education and boarding school are the alternatives.
