= Noorindoo, Queensland =

Noorindoo
- Suburb
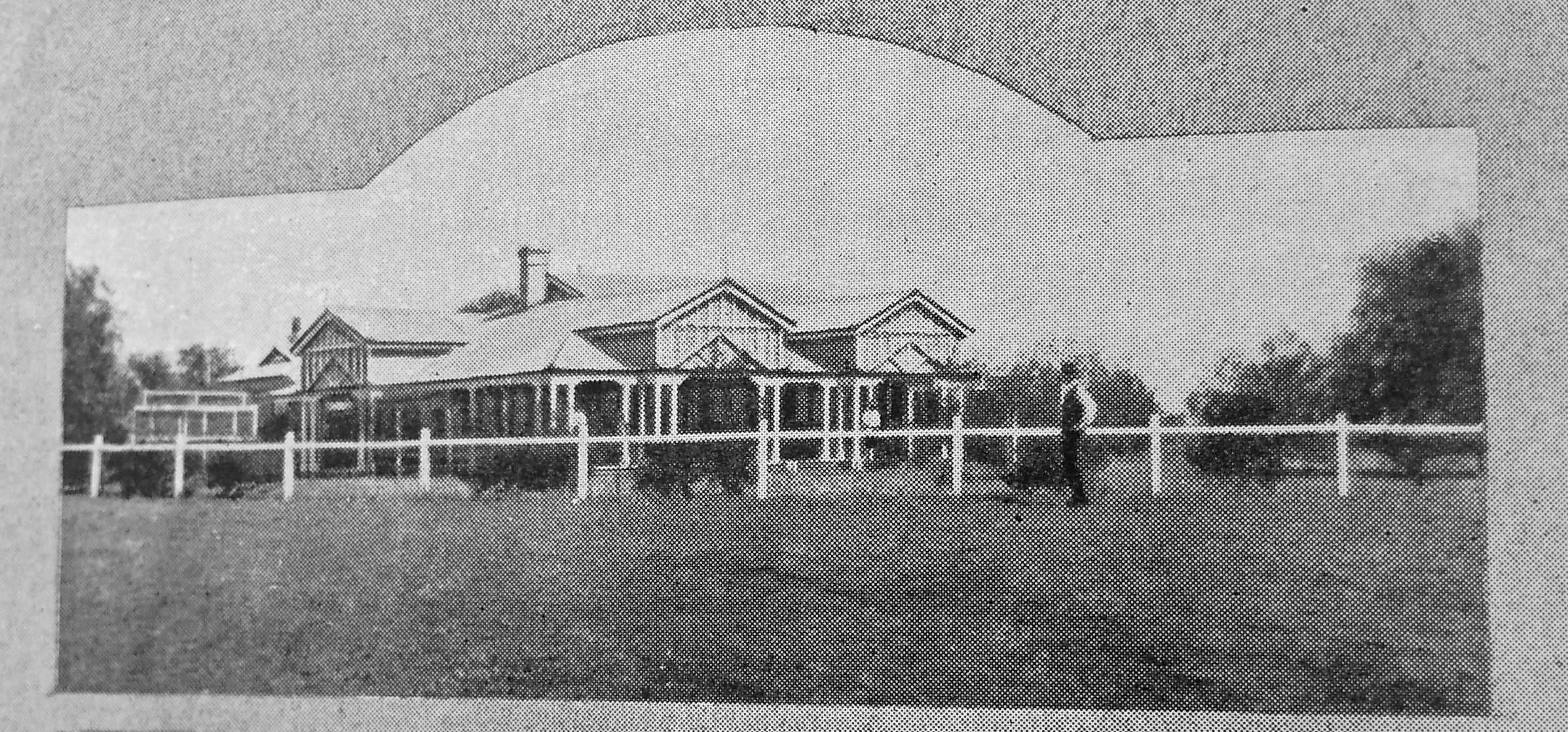
- Noorindoo homestead, 1916

- Interactive map of Noorindoo
- Coordinates: 27.0844°S 149.215°E
- Country: Australia
- State: Queensland
- LGA: Maranoa Region
- Location: 15.8 km (9.8 mi) N of Surat; 64.8 km (40.3 mi) SSE of Roma; 336 km (209 mi) WSW of Toowoomba; 463 km (288 mi) WSW of Brisbane

Government
  - State electorate: Warrego
  - Federal division: Maranoa

Area
  - Total: 1,059.3 km^{2} (409.0 sq mi)

Population
  - Total: 71 (2021 census)
  - Density: 0.0670/km^{2} (0.1736/sq mi)
- Time zone: UTC+10:00 (AEST)
- Postcode: 4417
Suburbs around Noorindoo
| Tingun | Wallumbilla South | Warkon |
| Oberina; Weribone | Noorindoo | Glenmorgan |
| Surat; Wellesley | Parknook | Glenmorgan |

Noorindoo is a rural locality in the Maranoa Region, Queensland, Australia. In the 2021 census, Noorindoo had a population of 71 people.

== Geography ==
Noorindoo is immediately north-east of the town of Surat.

Bingi Crossing is a ford on the Balonne River near the current River Road (27.0188°S 149.3763°E) which connects Noorindoo with neighbouring Warkon.

The Carnarvon Highway runs through from south-west to north-west, while the Surat Developmental Road runs along the southern boundary and the Roma-Condamine Road runs along the northern boundary.

Noorindoo has the following mountains:

- Dinnebarraba Hill (27.2364°S 149.4171°E) 313 metres (1,027 ft)
- Mount Walpanara (27.1288°S 149.1204°E) 283 metres (928 ft)
- The Ant Hill (27.0838°S 149.3759°E) 304 metres (997 ft)

There is a small section of the Yalbone State Forest in the north of the locality. Apart from this protected area, the land use is grazing on native vegetation and growing crops.

Surat Aerodrome is in the south-west of the locality, adjacent to the boundary with Surat (27.1595°S 149.0760°E). It has one runway 1,075 metres (3,527 ft) long with no support services. Any use must be pre-approved by the Maranoa Regional Council.

== History ==
The locality takes its name from the parish and lagoon, which in turn come from the pastoral run name, used from before 1858, reportedly the name of an Aboriginal person.

Nellybri Provisional School opened circa 1889. Between about 1896 and 1899, it became a half-time school in conjunction with Retreat Provisional School (meaning the schools shared a single teacher). The school closed in 1906. Nellybri is a pastoral station (27.1234°S 149.3816°E).

Beranga Bridge School opened circa 1896. It closed circa 1900. Beranga Creek and the Beranga pastoral station are within Noorindoo.

In September 1921, a meeting was held at the Frogmoor pastoral station (27.078°S 149.114°E) to apply for a provisional school. Beranga Provisional School opened circa August 1922. It closed temporarily in 1926 due to low student numbers, and closed permanently circa August 1929.

St Paul's Anglican Church opened at Bingi Crossing circa 1925. Its last service was 20 December 1942.

== Demographics ==
In the 2016 census, Noorindoo had a population of 55 people.

In the 2021 census, Noorindoo had a population of 71 people.

== Education ==
There are no schools in Noorindoo. The nearest government schools are Surat State School in neighbouring Surat to the south-west, which provides primary school and secondary schooling to Year 10, and Glenmorgan State School in neighbouring Glenmorgan to the south-east, which provides primary schooling to Year 6. There are no schools providing schooling to Year 12 nearby; the alternatives are distance education and boarding school.
