= Astor =

Astor or ASTOR may refer to:

== Companies ==
- Astor Pictures, a New York-based motion picture releasing company
- Astor Radio Corporation, an Australian consumer electronics manufacturer from 1926 onwards, which also owned the Astor Records label
- Astor Records, an Australian recording company and recorded music distributor that operated from the 1960s to the early 1980s
- Astor Trust Company, a New York-based financial trust, formerly Astor National Bank

== Military uses ==
- Mark 45 torpedo, Anti-Submarine TORpedo (known as ASTOR)
- Raytheon Sentinel, Airborne STand-Off Radar (known as ASTOR)

== People ==
- Astor (surname)
- Astor family, a wealthy 18th-century American family who became prominent in 20th-century British politics
- Astor Bennett, a character in the Showtime television series Dexter
- Astor Henríquez, Honduran footballer
- Astor Piazzolla, Argentine tango composer, bandoneon player, and arranger
- Astor C. Wuchter, American Lutheran pastor and author

== Places and buildings ==
- Astor, Florida, United States
- Astor, Kansas, United States
- Astor, West Virginia, United States
- Astor Court (Metropolitan Museum of Art), New York City, a Chinese-garden courtyard at the museum
- Astor Court Building, an apartment building on the Upper West Side of Manhattan
- Astor Hotel (disambiguation), several hotels
- Astor Place (Manhattan), a place leading to Broadway in New York City
- Astor Row, the name given to 130th Street between Fifth Avenue and Lenox in Harlem
- Astor Theatre (disambiguation), several theatres and cinemas
- The Astor (Sydney), a residential building in Sydney, Australia

== Transport ==
- MG Astor, a sport utility vehicle sold in India
- MS Astor (1981), a cruise ship that sailed under the name in 1981–1985 for Hadag Cruise Line and Safmarine
- MS Astor, a cruise ship that sailed under the name in 1986–1987 for Marlan Corporation and 1995 onwards for Transocean Tours
- SS Astor, a Panamanian cargo ship in service 1955–70

== See also ==
- Astore (disambiguation)
- Astoria (disambiguation)
- Aster (disambiguation)
