= Aster (name) =

Aster is unisex given name and a surname. It may refer to:

== Given name ==
- Aster Aweke (born 1959), Ethiopian singer
- Aster Fissehatsion (born 1951), Eritrean politician and political prisoner
- Aster Ganno (c. 1872–1964), Ethiopian Bible translator
- Aster Yohannes, Eritrean political prisoner

== Surname ==
- Ari Aster (born 1986), American filmmaker and screenwriter
- Ernst Ludwig von Aster (1778–1855), German army officer
- Jeannette Aster (born 1948), Austrian-Canadian opera director
- Jon C. Aster, American pathologist
- Misha Aster (born 1978), Canadian opera and classical music producer, director, writer and educator
- Richard Aster, American seismologist and professor
