= Misha Aster =

Canadian producer

Misha Aster is a Canadian producer, director, writer and educator specialising in opera and classical music.

== Biography ==
Born in Hamilton, Ontario in 1978, Aster studied violin at the Royal Conservatory of Music in Toronto, and history, politics, dramaturgy and musicology at McGill University, the London School of Economics, King's College London, the Moscow Art Theatre School, Berlin's Free University and at Harvard University, where he also held a teaching fellowship. He has taught opera and drama at the University of Victoria and Concordia University (Canada) and directed numerous theatre and opera productions on both sides of the Atlantic, including Carmen and Wozzeck in Canada, Cosi fan tutte (Czech Republic), Falstaff (Netherlands), Madama Butterfly (Austria) and Krenek's Dark Waters at the Konzerthaus in Berlin.

From 2004–06 Aster served as Staff Director at the Tiroler Landestheater in Innsbruck, Austria. He has also worked at Vancouver Opera, Teatro la Fenice in Venice, l'Opéra National du Rhin, the Deutsche Oper Berlin, and at important festivals in Italy, Austria, and the Netherlands, collaborating with directors such as Robert Carsen, Tim Albery, Brigitte Fassbaender, François Rochaix and Götz Friedrich and conductors Kenneth Montgomery, Yves Abel and Martin Fischer-Dieskau.

As a consultant and associate producer, Aster has cooperated with Eikon Media, TeamWorX Productions, Klassikwerkstatt, and the Canadian Broadcasting Corporation. Together with pianist, Michael Abramovich, he directed Ensemble Alkan and produced the concert series 'Im buntesten Chaos – das Jüdische in der Musik' at Berlin's Jewish Museum. He has worked as a dramaturg at the American Repertory Theatre in Cambridge, Massachusetts, and as project manager with the Berlin Philharmonic Orchestra, at the Berlin State Opera and at Kronberg Academy, near Frankfurt. Misha Aster works a Producer/A&R Consultant for the recording label Deutsche Grammophon. In 2018, he joined the Vancouver Symphony as Vice-President, Artistic Planning and Production.

== Books ==
Aster's book, The Reich's Orchestra: the Berlin Philharmonic 1933–45 was published by Siedler Verlag/Random House, Germany in 2007 and has since been translated into six languages. A history of Berlin's Staatsoper Unter den Linden 1918–1991, including a foreword by Daniel Barenboim, was published by Siedler Verlag/Random House, Germany in Fall 2017. A frequent contributor to The Walrus, The Independent and Die Zeit (Germany), among others, Aster has presented lectures on music and media, history, and politics at the University of Cologne, Staatsoper Unter den Linden, the Gasteig (Munich), the Mariinsky Theater (St. Petersburg) and at London's Wiener Library.
