= Huwise =

- Type: Private company
- Industry: Data Management
- Founded: 2011; 15 years ago
- Headquarters: Paris, France
- Number of locations: Paris, Boston, Nantes
- Key people: Jean-Marc Lazard, Franck Carassus, David Thoumas
- Number of employees: 100 (2026)
- Website: www.huwise.com

Huwise, formerly Opendatasoft, is a French company that offers data product marketplace software. Based in Paris, it also has a subsidiary in Boston (United States) and an office in Nantes (France).

Its software allows users to organize, share, and visualize any type of data. The Huwise platform can be used by both private companies and public entities.

== History ==
Huwise was founded (as Opendatasoft) in 2011 by Jean-Marc Lazard (CEO), Franck Carassus (CEO North America), and David Thoumas (CTO).

In 2014, the company was integrated into the incubation program of the Open Data Institute to promote the sharing of public data. That same year, Opendatasoft was ranked by the Electronic Business Group as one of the ten most innovative startups in France.

In June 2015, Huwise was awarded €1.5 million in seed funding from the venture capital fund Aurinvest.

In 2016, Huwise was included in the "IDC Innovators: Smart City Open Data Platforms" report. In the same year, the company opened its North American headquarters in Boston, Massachusetts.

In October 2016, Huwise was granted €5 million in Series A funding from Aster Capital, Salesforce Ventures, Aurinvest., and Caisse des Dépôts et Consignations, who were joined two years later by UL Ventures.

In November 2018, Huwise launched "Data on Board," an annual summit for enthusiasts of data and data sharing. In 2018, 250 people attended the event. During the second edition, held at Campus Station F in Paris, 500 participants and 20 French and international speakers met to discuss the challenges surrounding the use and sharing of data.

In September 2025, OpenDataSoft officially rebranded itself as Huwise.

In 2026, a Forrester Consulting Total Economic Impact™ study, based on interviews with data leaders at four large customer organizations (financial services, insurance, software, and environmental services), describes how the Huwise platform enabled them to cut the time business users spend searching for data by 50%, reduce data preparation time for data teams by 50%, and achieve a fourfold reduction in data product duplication.

== Product ==
Huwise is a SaaS (software as a service) solution that allows companies, local authorities, and public administrations to organize, share, and visualize any type of data (as tables and graphs), as well as make data available via APIs.

Historically, its customers include entities of the French government and local French communities. In recent years, Huwise has broadened the scope of its activities and now works with all types of companies, both public and private, in France and around the world. Users of the software can share their data publicly as open data to create services for citizens, users of public transportation, companies, and associations. The data can also be published in a limited way within an organization or a group of organizations for use by partners or employees.

Huwise's customers come from a variety of sectors: energy & utilities, local communities, transportation & mobility, government, banking & insurance, luxury goods, IoT, etc.

To date, Huwise has more than 280 customers worldwide in Europe (France, Belgium, United Kingdom, Germany, Switzerland, Spain, Portugal), North America (United States, Canada), Mexico, Australia, and the Middle East.

In particular, the company has developed the open data portals of the City of Paris (Paris Data), the SNCF Group, the GRDF Group, Kering, EDF, the Occitanie Region, Mexico City, Newark, and Vancouver.
