= HMS Aster =

Two ships of the Royal Navy have been named HMS Aster after the flowering plant:

- HMS Aster (1915) was an Acacia-class sloop, launched in 1915 and sunk in 1917
- HMS Aster (K188) was a Flower-class corvette, launched in 1941 and sold in 1946
