= Astor Theatre, Surat =

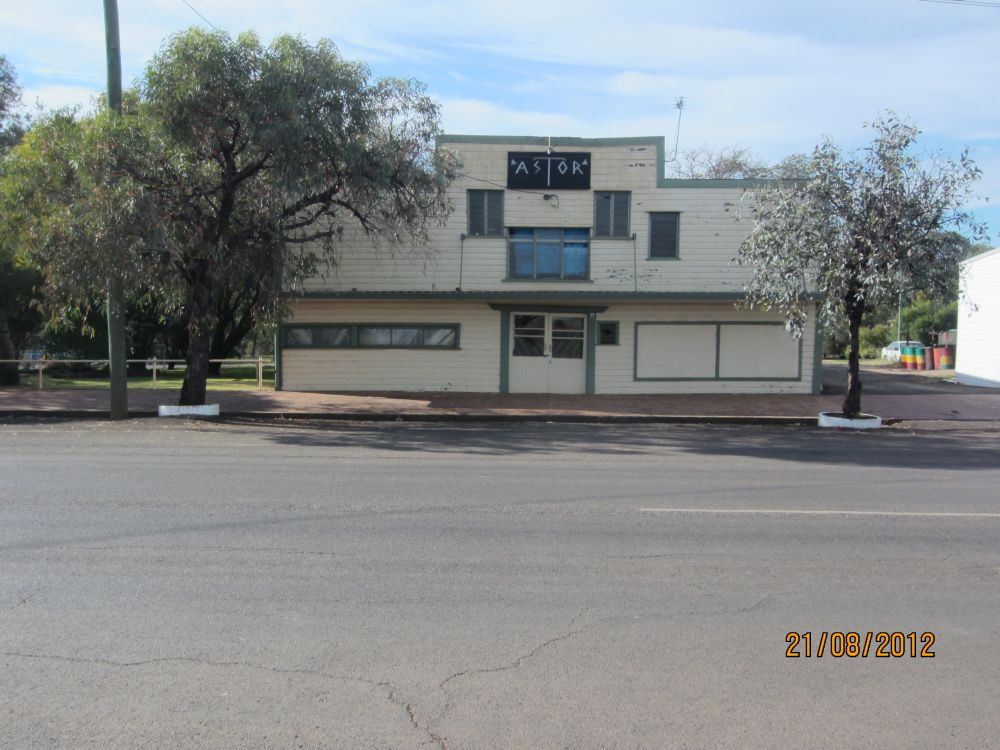
- Astor Theatre, 2012

- Location within Queensland Location within Australia
- 27.1518°S 149.0699°E
- Location: 77 Burrowes Street, Surat, Maranoa Region, Queensland, Australia

History
- Design period: 1919 - 1930s (interwar period)
- Built: 1925 - 1960s

Queensland Heritage Register
- Official name: Astor Theatre
- Type: state heritage (built)
- Designated: 27 September 2002
- Reference no.: 602352
- Significant period: 1925, 1950s, 1960s (fabric); 1925-ongoing (social)
- Significant components: auditorium, projection booth/bio box, shed/s, foyer - entrance

Astor Theatre is a heritage-listed cinema at 77 Burrowes Street, Surat, Maranoa Region, Queensland, Australia. It was built from 1925 to 1960s. It was added to the Queensland Heritage Register on 27 September 2002.

== History ==
The Astor Picture Theatre was built in 1925 as an open-air picture theatre in Surat, which is situated on the Balonne River 80 kilometres (50 mi) south of Roma and was the administrative centre of the Warroo Shire until its amalgamation into the Maranoa Region in 2008.

The Surveyor-General of New South Wales, Thomas Mitchell, mapped the area in 1846 and the District of Maranoa was proclaimed in November 1848. The new Commissioner of Lands arrived with several police in 1849 and set up camp on Yambougal station, moving slightly up river a few months later. This was the site selected in 1849 by surveyor James Burrowes for a service township on the Balonne River. He called the township Surat, after his former home in Madras, India. The main street, on which the theatre is situated, carries this surveyor's name.

A Court of Petty Sessions at Surat was gazetted in 1850 and a police building was erected. The Lands and Post Offices were soon represented and in 1859 a hotel was built. By the time that the town site was surveyed for land sales in 1863, a number of buildings had already been erected. Although Surat was superseded by St George as an administrative centre for the district in 1865, it continued to serve the surrounding area, which became Warroo Shire. Surat gained a school in 1874 and its first church in the late 1870s. In 1879 Cobb and Co set up a coach service from St George to Surat and on to Yuleba, constructing a staging post and store at Surat. This service was run until 1924, when it was the last coach route to be run in Australia.

Surat Pictures Limited was formed in 1925 when W Kitson sought building approval for the construction of a picture theatre in the main street of Surat. This was an open-air picture theatre comprising an earth-floored enclosure, a canvas screen at the rear and a shallow building along the street frontage containing a foyer with a projection booth above it. This type of structure was the cheapest and simplest kind of purpose built film venue and was not uncommon at the time in the warmer parts of Australia, though many of them were later roofed over.

The Lumiere Brothers had produced the first moving films in Paris in 1895, followed by Edison Studios in America in 1896, although these early films were very short and simply captured events without a narrative. The first feature length movie The Story of the Kelly Gang was made in Australia in 1906 and it was the ability of film to tell a story that was the key to its popularity. At first, films were shown as part of variety shows in theatres or were screened in halls. In the 1900s purpose built picture theatres showing a program of films accompanied by music were built in America, Europe and Australia. Some of those catering to centres with large populations were huge and luxurious, though most were far more modest.

Films were much less expensive to show than live theatre and the equipment was easily transported, making them well suited as an entertainment in country areas, some films being displayed by travelling "picture show men" in the early years. The growing popularity of films led to the construction of many open-air theatres or simple shed-like buildings as permanent venues for showing film. Although theatre chains usually owned the large "picture palaces" in cities, most small picture theatres in Queensland were independently owned and Queensland eventually had more independently owned theatres than any other state in Australia. These small ventures, frequently family owned, did not have the capital to build lavish premises, nor did they have a large client base in country areas and might screen movies only once or twice a week. Having invested in expensive projection equipment, particularly after the advent of talkies, extensions and improvements to picture theatres were often made piecemeal as demand grew and money became available. The Astor Theatre, extended in stages, provides a good illustration of this process.

The first films shown at Surat were silent and had a piano accompaniment, a generator providing power for the projector. Bill McKay Senior was the first proprietor and ran the Astor until the 1930s, when it passed to Geoff Armstrong. Between 1938 and 1940 a Mrs. Crump leased it. It was operated during the Second World War by GO and RD Armstrong and was acquired in 1945 by E J and V M Aldridge who ran it as a family business, with their son acting as the projectionist.

Country picture theatres provided an important service to people in the surrounding area. Coming into town for a night at the pictures provided good family entertainment, a venue for courtship and an opportunity for people of all ages to meet. Picture theatres showed feature films, newsreels, and cartoons and were often also used for live shows and special events. They provided a stimulus for the imagination and a relief from isolation and anxiety, particularly in the difficult years of the Depression and of World War II. They were a link with the wider community in Australia and with contemporary American culture as presented by Hollywood. For all these reasons, picture going enjoyed widespread popularity throughout rural Queensland between the 1920s and 1950s.

Surat was connected to a reticulated water system in 1952 and electricity was laid on in 1953 when the Aldridge family sold the theatre to S Barry, who had run the Queen's Theatre in Toowoomba during World War II. During Barry's ownership the Astor underwent major changes. In the 1950s it was converted into an indoor theatre and roofed over, although it retained an earth floor. Such conversions were commonly made to shelter patrons and improve sound quality. The Royal Theatre at Winton is now the only example of this early open form to survive as a cinema.

In the 1960s the Astor was extended substantially, toilets were added and a raked timber floor was installed. The theatre could become very cold in winter and gas heating replaced the chip heaters originally used. It is thought that the interior was also lined with fibrous cement sheeting during this period. Television came to Surat in the 1970s and reduced attendance, as it had elsewhere. Barry sold the theatre to Lawrence Cherry who owned a local service station. Between 1974 and 1981 Cherry, N & M Crain and L & D Waud ran the Astor, which was then purchased by Len and Doreen Waud. Mr Waud had been a projectionist in Sydney in 1936 and his wife an usherette at the Regent in Toowoomba. A new sound system was installed.

In common with many rural centres, Surat lost population in the 1980s and 1990s as falling prices and severe drought reduced the town's income and businesses closed. In the mid 1990s a programme to revive the town was set in motion by the local shire council and community and the town is now experiencing an economic resurgence. The Cobb and Co staging station has been developed as a museum and tourist attraction. The Astor Theatre is still used and hosted the Movie Muster, a festival of Australian films, during the Centenary of Federation celebrations in 2001. Although extensions and additions took place in the mid 20th century, these were to improve function as a picture theatre rather than to create change and the building is still a good example of its type, which has become rare. It retains early carbon arc projectors.

== Description ==
The Astor Theatre is situated in the commercial centre of Surat and is a simple rectangular timber building set on low stumps. The roof is gabled and clad in corrugated iron and is concealed from the front by a deep stepped parapet. There are louvred openings in the upper section of the parapet and a cantilevered awning over the entrance. There are exit doors in the side and rear of the building and well as the front entrance.

The front section of the building is divided into three and comprises a central foyer with a confectionary bar to the left and the ladies toilets to the right. The projection box is above the foyer and is reached by narrow timber stairs on the left hand side.

The auditorium is a simple rectangular space; the walls being lined with timber and fibrous plaster sheeting. The ceiling is unlined and laminated timber struts brace the walls. The floor is raked and there are several louvred timber windows along the walls to provide ventilation. Towards the rear of the building, there are sections of latticework under the eaves. The interior lining now covers this provision for ventilation.

There is a speaker area behind the screen and the men's toilets are at this end of the building also. Canvas stretcher chairs provide seating.

There is a small shed to the rear of the building and a modern brick footpath has been laid outside the front entrance.

== Heritage listing ==
Astor Theatre was listed on the Queensland Heritage Register on 27 September 2002 having satisfied the following criteria.

The place is important in demonstrating the evolution or pattern of Queensland's history.

The Astor Picture Theatre, Surat is important in demonstrating the development of picture theatres in Queensland and the part that picture going played in the life of Australia in the 20th century, before it began to be displaced by television. Picture theatres enjoyed widespread popularity, especially in rural areas, as they provided not only entertainment, but also a venue for social interaction and a means of reducing isolation by providing a window into the wider world. The Astor Theatre is evidence for the popularity of picture going throughout rural Queensland between the 1920s and 1950s.

The place demonstrates rare, uncommon or endangered aspects of Queensland's cultural heritage.

The Astor is rare as one of the very few early picture theatres remaining in Queensland that have not been adapted for other uses. Alterations have been made over the years to improve its function as a picture theatre, rather than to accommodate changed use. It retains two early projectors in the bio box.

The place is important in demonstrating the principal characteristics of a particular class of cultural places.

The Astor Theatre is a good example of its type, illustrating the way in which many small picture theatres were developed from modest early beginnings and retains characteristics of its type such as long sight lines, a raked floor, foyer, projection box and confectionary counter.

The place is important because of its aesthetic significance.

The Astor Theatre is centrally located in Surat and makes an important contribution to the built character of the town.

The place has a strong or special association with a particular community or cultural group for social, cultural or spiritual reasons.

It has important associations with the community of the town and the surrounding area, as a venue for social interaction and popular entertainment, and for many members of which it is a focus for memories.
