= Surat, Queensland =

Surat
- Town
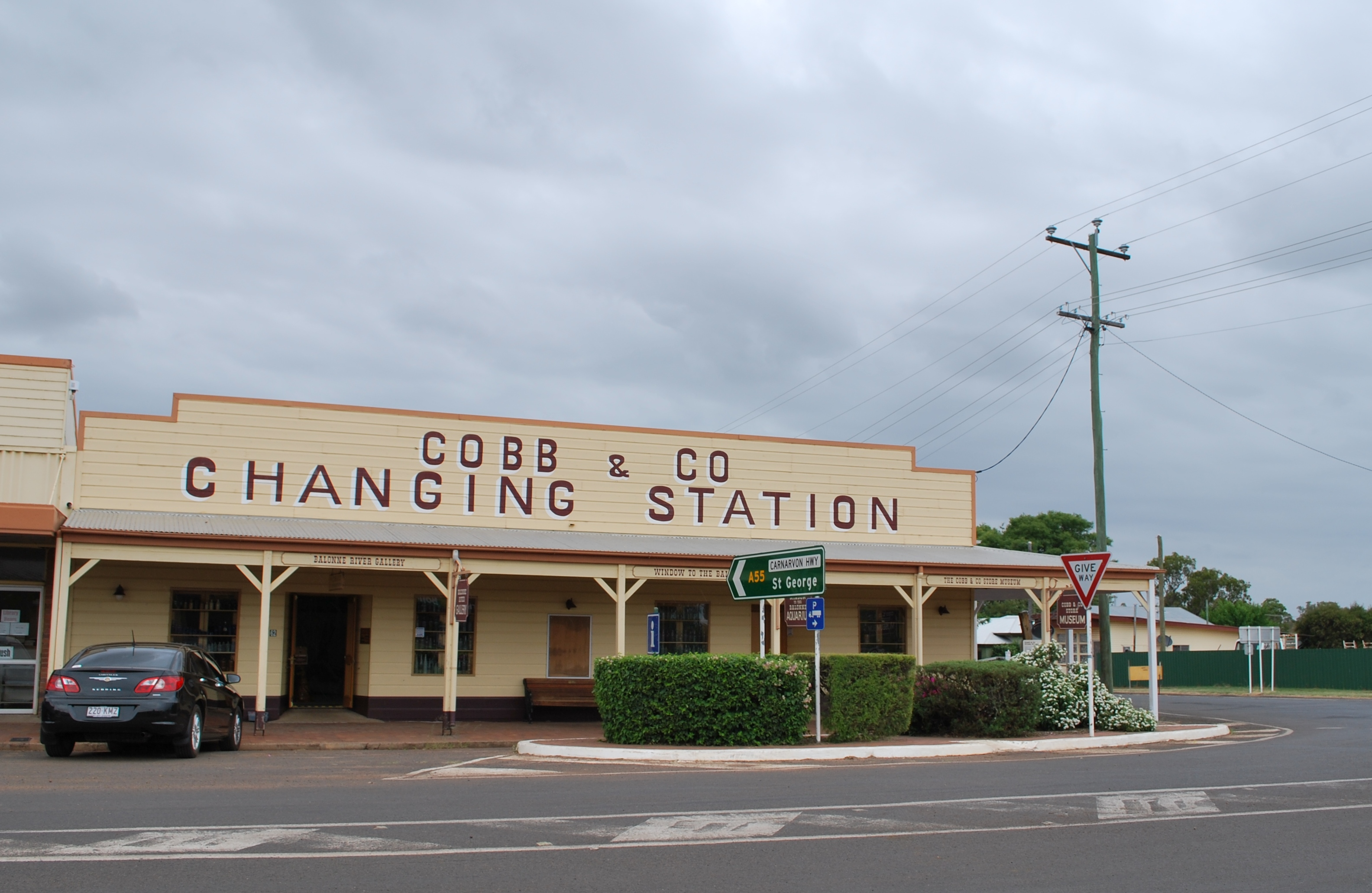
- Cobb and Co Changing Station

- Interactive map of Surat
- Coordinates: 27.1544°S 149.0677°E
- Country: Australia
- State: Queensland
- LGA: Maranoa Region
- Location: 79.4 km (49.3 mi) SSE of Roma; 116 km (72 mi) NE of St George; 320 km (200 mi) W of Toowoomba; 506 km (314 mi) W of Brisbane
- Established: 1849

Government
  - State electorate: Warrego
  - Federal division: Maranoa

Area
  - Total: 2.1 km^{2} (0.81 sq mi)
- Elevation: 246 m (807 ft)

Population
  - Total: 402 (2021 census)
  - Density: 191/km^{2} (496/sq mi)
- Time zone: UTC+10:00 (AEST)
- Postcode: 4417
- Mean max temp: 27.9 °C (82.2 °F)
- Mean min temp: 13.1 °C (55.6 °F)
- Annual rainfall: 572.4 mm (22.54 in)
Localities around Surat
Wellesley	Weribone	Noorindoo
Wellesley	Surat	Noorindoo
Wellesley	Wellesley	Noorindoo

Surat /səˈræt/ is a rural town and locality in the Maranoa Region, Queensland, Australia. In the 2021 census, the locality of Surat had a population of 402 people.

== Geography ==
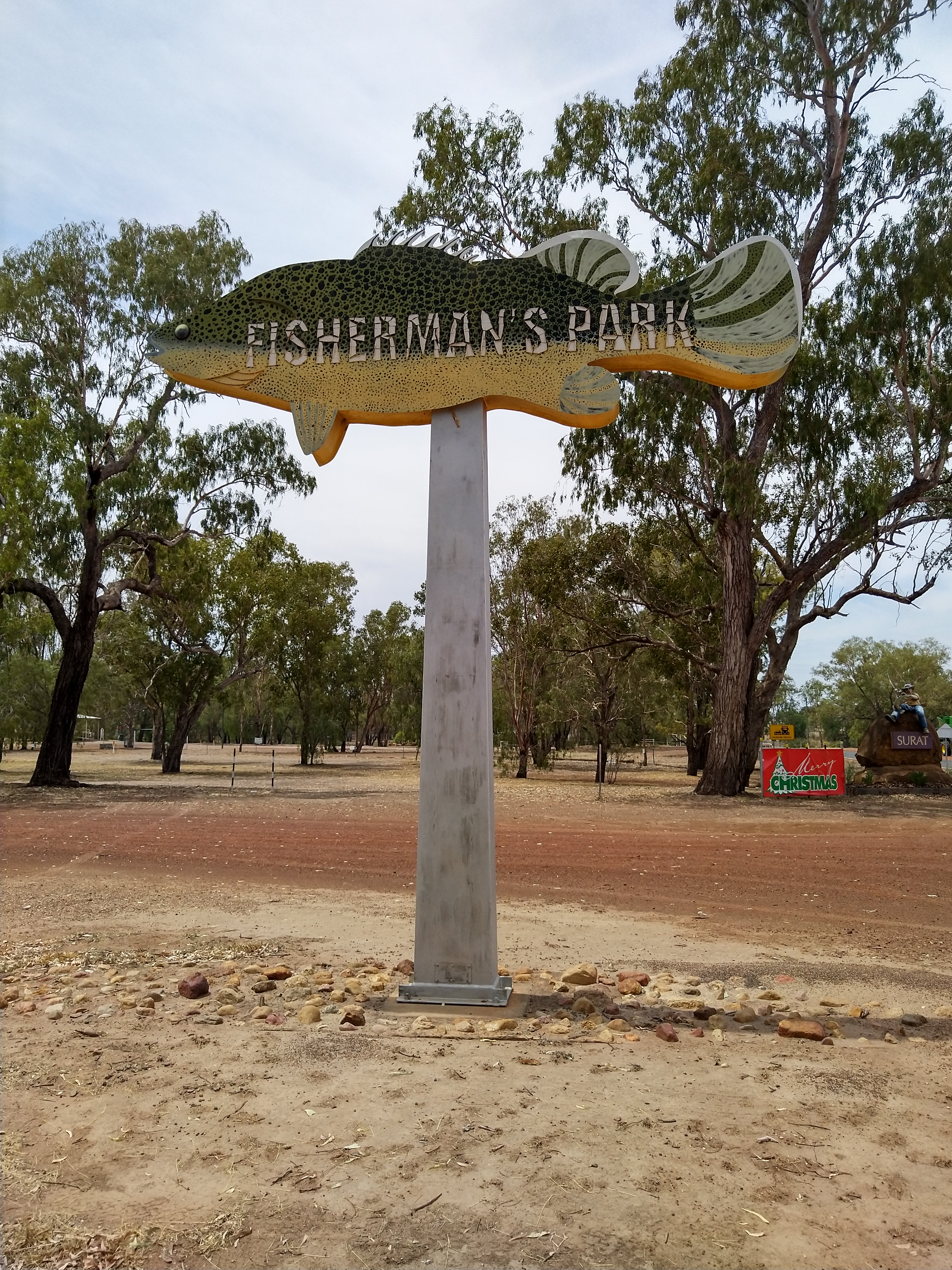
Fisherman's Park, Surat, Queensland

The town of Surat is on the Balonne River, approximately 75 kilometres (47 mi) south of Roma on the Carnarvon Highway in South West Queensland. It is 450 kilometres (280 mi) west of Brisbane.

There are oil fields further south.

=== Climate ===
Surat has a humid subtropical climate bordering on a subtropical semi-arid climate (Köppen: Cfa/BSh) with hot, wetter summers and quite mild, drier winters. The town is sunny, with 159.0 clear days and 62.9 cloudy days per annum. The wettest recorded day was 2 May 2010 with 154.0 mm (6.06 in) of rainfall. Extreme temperatures ranged from 45.7 °C (114.3 °F) on 3 January 2014 to −5.9 °C (21.4 °F) on 29 May 1987.

Climate data for Surat (27.16°S 149.07°E) (246 m (807 ft) AMSL) (1881-2025)
Month	Jan	Feb	Mar	Apr	May	Jun	Jul	Aug	Sep	Oct	Nov	Dec	Year
Record high °C (°F)	45.7 (114.3)	44.5 (112.1)	41.9 (107.4)	36.8 (98.2)	33.0 (91.4)	30.6 (87.1)	29.4 (84.9)	36.8 (98.2)	40.0 (104.0)	41.7 (107.1)	44.3 (111.7)	44.0 (111.2)	45.7 (114.3)
Mean daily maximum °C (°F)	34.4 (93.9)	33.5 (92.3)	31.8 (89.2)	28.2 (82.8)	23.6 (74.5)	20.2 (68.4)	19.8 (67.6)	21.9 (71.4)	25.8 (78.4)	29.4 (84.9)	32.1 (89.8)	33.9 (93.0)	27.9 (82.2)
Mean daily minimum °C (°F)	20.9 (69.6)	20.4 (68.7)	18.1 (64.6)	13.2 (55.8)	8.9 (48.0)	5.6 (42.1)	4.3 (39.7)	5.7 (42.3)	9.5 (49.1)	14.0 (57.2)	17.2 (63.0)	19.5 (67.1)	13.1 (55.6)
Record low °C (°F)	10.9 (51.6)	9.4 (48.9)	5.5 (41.9)	0.0 (32.0)	−5.9 (21.4)	−5.0 (23.0)	−5.1 (22.8)	−4.7 (23.5)	−2.0 (28.4)	0.6 (33.1)	4.3 (39.7)	7.4 (45.3)	−5.9 (21.4)
Average precipitation mm (inches)	70.6 (2.78)	73.8 (2.91)	59.9 (2.36)	29.8 (1.17)	33.3 (1.31)	35.5 (1.40)	37.5 (1.48)	27.0 (1.06)	29.2 (1.15)	48.8 (1.92)	55.9 (2.20)	71.3 (2.81)	572.4 (22.54)
Average precipitation days (≥ 0.2 mm)	6.7	6.1	5.3	3.4	4.0	4.4	4.5	3.8	4.0	5.6	6.0	6.6	60.4
Average afternoon relative humidity (%)	38	41	38	38	44	46	44	37	32	33	34	35	38
Average dew point °C (°F)	15.1 (59.2)	15.7 (60.3)	13.2 (55.8)	10.2 (50.4)	8.9 (48.0)	6.7 (44.1)	5.3 (41.5)	4.4 (39.9)	5.4 (41.7)	8.2 (46.8)	10.5 (50.9)	13.2 (55.8)	9.7 (49.5)
Source: Bureau of Meteorology (1881-2025)

== History ==
=== Mandandanji ===
Mandandanji (also known as Mandandanyi, Mandandanjdji, Kogai) is an Australian Aboriginal language spoken by the Mandandanji people. The Mandandanji language region includes the landscape within the local government boundaries of the Maranoa Regional Council, particularly Roma, Yuleba and Surat, then east towards Chinchilla and south-west towards Mitchell and St George.

=== British colonisation ===
The first documented British exploration of the area was the expedition led by New South Wales Surveyor-General Sir Thomas Mitchell in 1846.

Pastoralist squatters soon followed in 1848 with Joseph Fleming establishing the Talavera station and Thomas Simpson Hall forming the Surat, Colgoon, Weribone and Yamboucal stations along the upper Balonne River. Hall and Fleming faced considerable resistance from the local Mandandanji to their occupation of the land, and had to maintain a force of twelve armed men against the "native blacks". Fleming, who was the brother of John Henry Fleming, the main instigator of the Myall Creek massacre, named his property Talavera (a famous battle of the Peninsular War) due to his battles with the Aborigines there. It is unknown why Hall called one of his properties Surat but it was possibly named after the city of Surat in India.

The local Commissioner of Crown Lands, John Henry Durbin, established a hut at Yamboucal in 1849 and within a month, he was under siege from the Mandandanji. Some reports indicate that to break the siege, Durbin and his troopers shot a large number of Aborigines. Roderick Mitchell, the son of Sir Thomas Mitchell, took over as Commissioner of Crown Lands and in 1850 moved the residence around two kilometres upstream from Durbin's hut. The new settlement was called Surat. The Mandandanji again resisted, killing Mitchell's bullocks and preventing his men from building the huts. Mitchell dispersed the local Aborigines in a show of force, allowing the first of Surat's houses to be built. In 1851, government surveyor Robert Cooper Bagot mapped the township of Surat.

Due to patrols of the Native Police, local Aboriginal resistance had ceased by 1852. Thomas Davis, the father of Steele Rudd the writer, lived in Surat in the early 1850s and recalled the fearful and unjustified slaughter of Aboriginal people resulting from these patrols, even though he actively participated in some of them. One of the last mass-killings in the vicinity occurred a kilometre downstream from Surat in May 1852, where a massacre of peaceful Aboriginal workers on Hall's Yamboucal station was perpetrated by Native Police troopers led by local colonists.

Surat as a town was slow to develop, still only having three buildings by the early 1860s. The 1870s saw some civic infrastructure evolve.

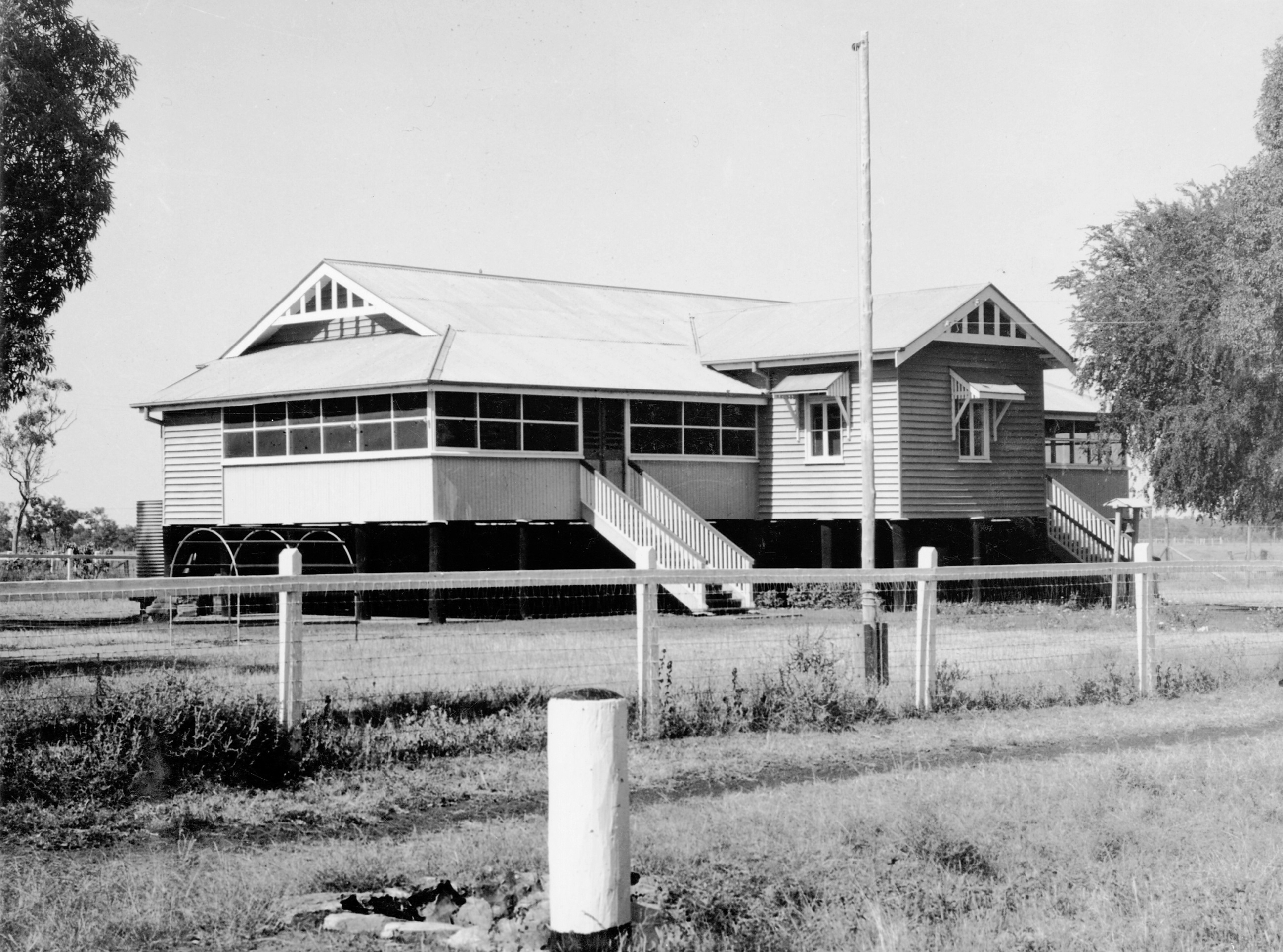
Surat State School (1929 building), circa 1954

Surat State School opened on 23 July 1874.

All Saints Anglican Church was built from timber by contractor Mr Williams and opened on Sunday 23 February 1879. It was replaced in 1938 by another timber church, St John the Divine Anglican Church, which was opened by Archbishop William Wand on Sunday 24 April 1938. St John's was designed by architect Lange Powell. It was closed in 2019. Both Anglican churches were at 27 Cordelia Street (27.154498°S 149.0677°E).

St Peter and St Paul's Catholic Church was built from timber in 1884. It was in Robert Street. In 1956, it was replaced by the new Church of the Immaculate Conception in Ivan Street. In 1965, it was replaced by a new brick church also called the Church of the Immaculate Conception, designed by Ian Ferrier.

In June 1925, a branch of the Queensland Country Women's Association was established in Surat.

St Stephen's Presbyterian Church was built from timber by Mr R.T. Garvie. It was opened on Wednesday 31 October 1934. It was at 33 William Street (27.15257°S 149.0647°E). It has closed and is now used as Surat's Men's Shed.

The Kingdom Hall of Jehovah's Witnesses opened about 1985.

== Demographics ==
In the 2011 census, the town of Surat had a population of 426 people.

In the 2016 census, the locality of Surat had a population of 407 people.

In the 2021 census, the locality of Surat had a population of 402 people.

== Heritage listings ==
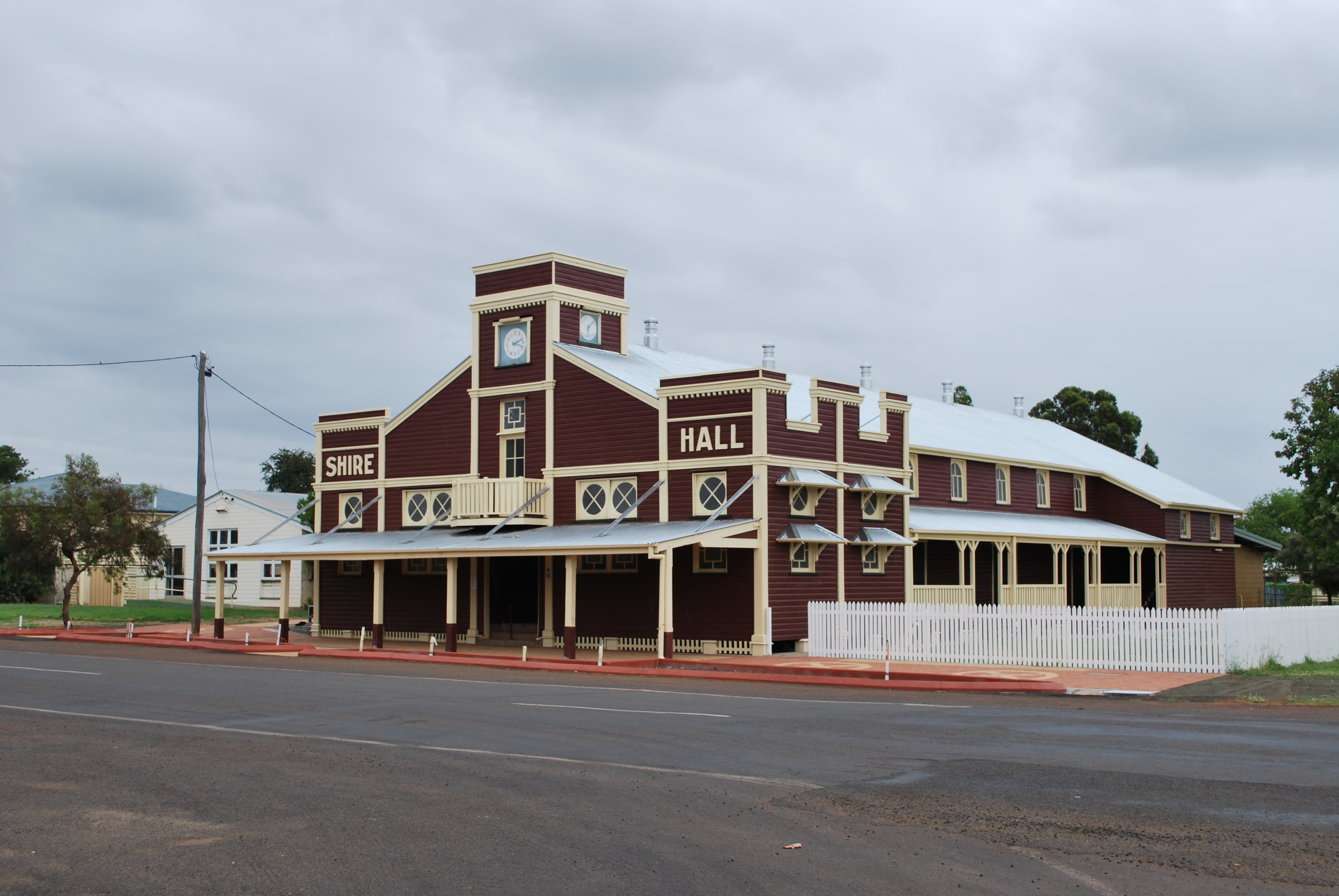
Warroo Shire Hall

Surat has a number of heritage-listed sites, including:

- Astor Theatre, 77 Burrowes Street
- Warroo Shire Hall, corner Cordelia & William Streets

== Education ==
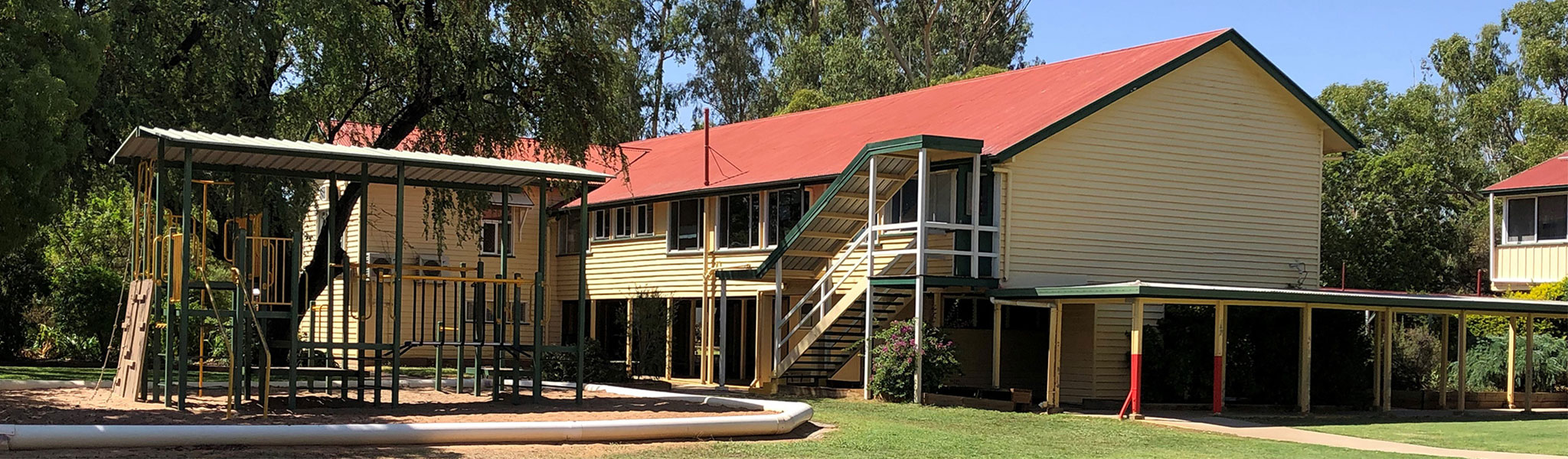
Surat State School, 2023

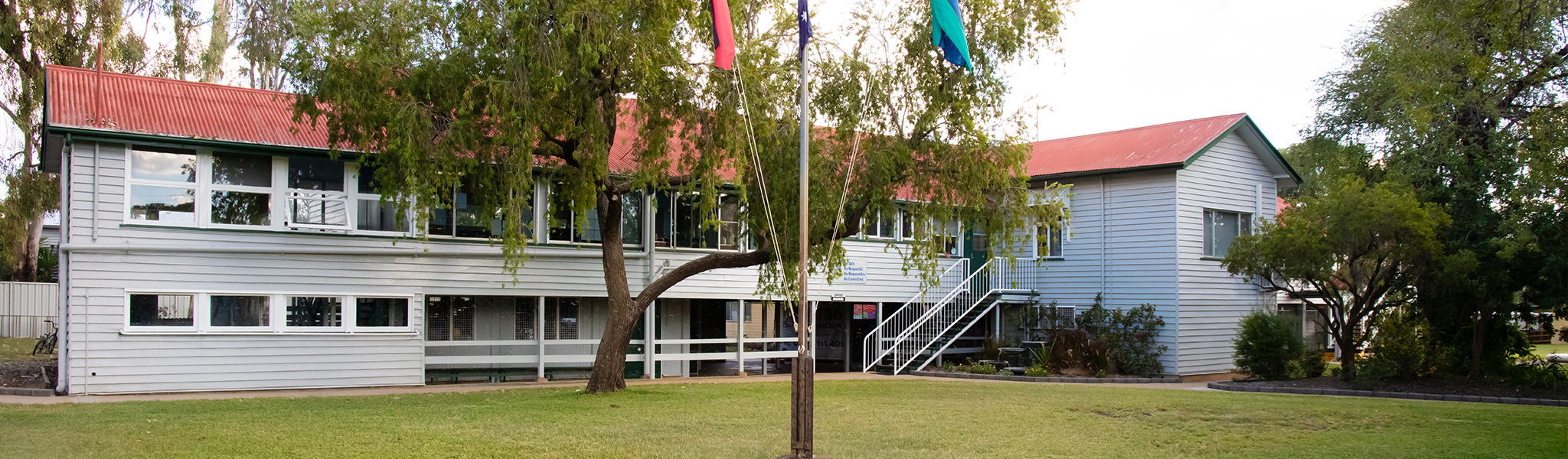
Surat State School, 2024

Surat State School is a government primary and secondary (Prep-10) school for boys and girls at 55 Robert Street (27.1543°S 149.0670°E). In 2017, the school had an enrolment of 87 students with 14 teachers (12 full-time equivalent) and 10 non-teaching staff (8 full-time equivalent). In 2018, the school had an enrolment of 97 students with 13 teachers (12 full-time equivalent) and 11 non-teaching staff (8 full-time equivalent).

There are no secondary schooling to Year 12 in Surat nor nearby. Options are distance education or boarding school.

== Amenities ==
Maranoa Regional Council operates a public library at 62 Burrowes Street, within the Cobb & Co. Changing Station complex. The public library opened in 1997 and has publicly accessible Wi-Fi. The complex also has a Cobb & Co changing station, freshwater aquarium, social history museum, theatre and shire hall and the Balonne gallery.

The Roman Catholic Church of the Immaculate Conception is aat 99 Ivan Street (27.157085°S 149.0728°E).

== Media ==
Along with a number of other regional Australian newspapers owned by NewsCorp, the Surat Basin News newspaper ceased publication in June 2020.

== Attractions ==
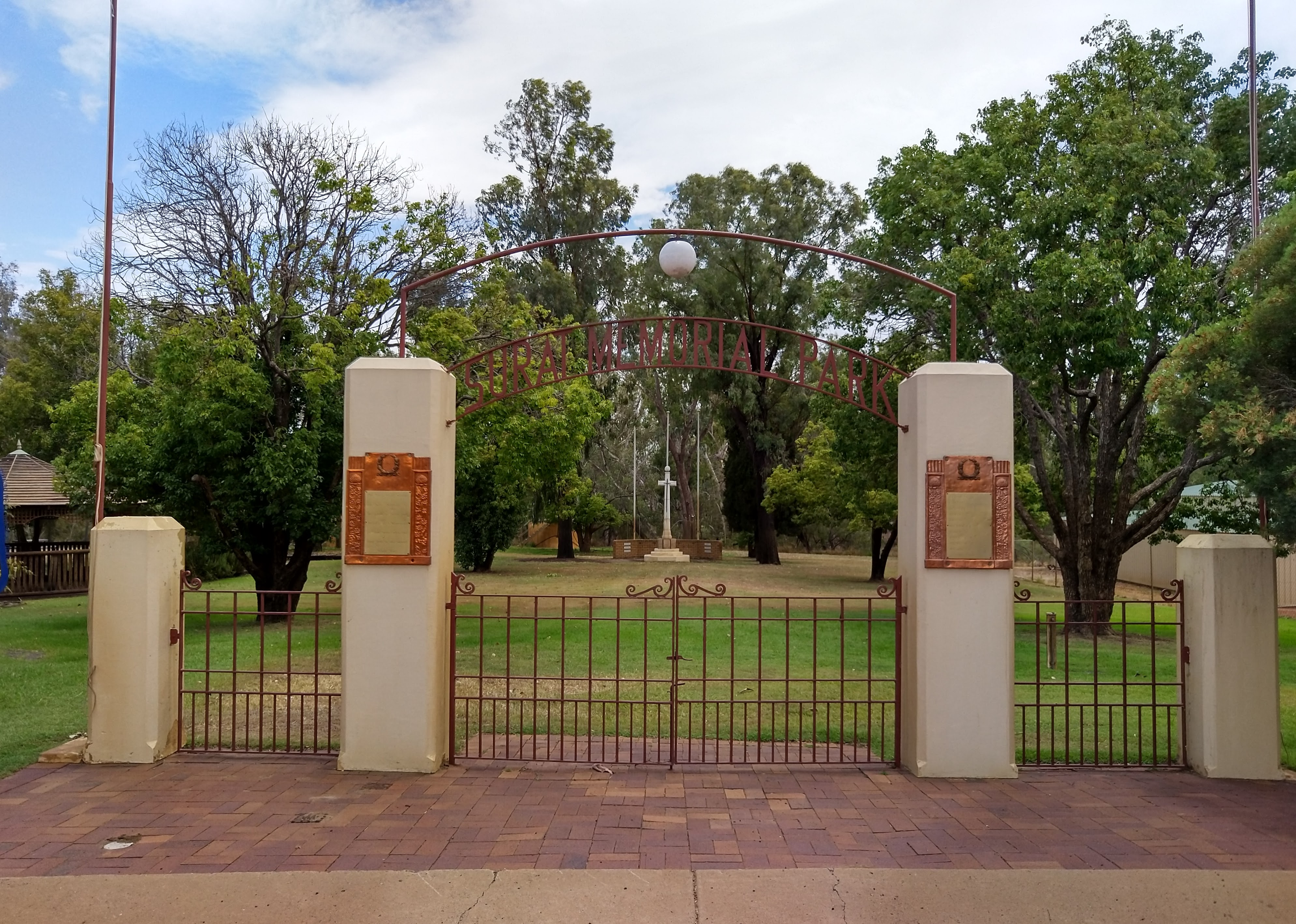
Surat war memorial gates

Surat's war memorial is sited on the banks of the river, immediately alongside the town's water scheme. It is dedicated to the local citizens who lost their lives in military service during the Second World War.
