= Queensland Country Women's Association =

Women's organisation in Queensland, Australia

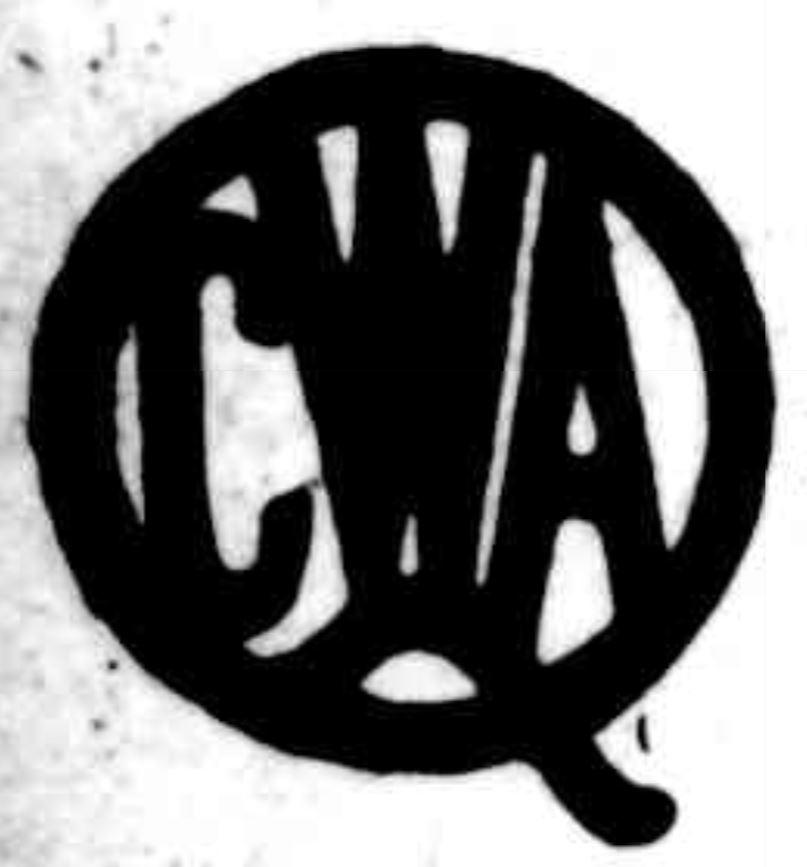
Logo of the Queensland Country Women's Association, 1928

The Queensland Country Women's Association (QCWA) is the Queensland chapter of the Country Women's Association in Australia. The association seeks to serve the interests of women and children in rural areas in Australia through a network of local branches. Established in 1922, local branches provide friendship and mutual support to their members while contributing to the betterment of life in their local communities. Over time, many branches have evolved to include support for wider issues such as domestic violence campaigns and fundraising for international initiatives such as orphanages.

In 2019 the QWCA received a Queensland Greats Award from the Queensland Government.

== History ==
On 8–11 August 1922, the Brisbane Women's Club held an open conference for countrywomen in Brisbane's Albert Hall during the Exhibition (a time when many country people visited Brisbane). The conference was opened by Lady Forster, wife of Australian Governor-General and the Queensland Governor Matthew Nathan attended. On 11 August 1922, the outcome of the conference was to establish the Queensland Country Women's Association. Ruth Fairfax was elected the first president.

The first meeting of the Toowoomba branch was held at the Toowoomba Town Hall on 12 September 1922. Fairfax attended and spoke about the objectives of the organisation. The meeting resolved to hold a conference as soon as there were sufficient representatives to attend.

The objectives of the association were broad but included some specific items:

1. To improve welfare and conditions of women and children in the country

2. To draw together all women, girls, and children in Country Districts.

3. To bring opportunities for recreation and enjoyment within reach of all Members.

4. To encourage the active study of Local, Municipal and State affairs and to promote a wise and kindly spirit.

5. To improve educational facilities in the Country.

6. To secure better provision for the safeguarding of Public Health especially of children, and the securing of more adequate Medical and Hospital facilities for Country Districts.

There was a call for a design for a badge and the winner was Mabel Chandler of Burra Burri who proposed the letters CWA within a large letter "Q"; this design is still used as the organisation's logo. It was decided that the silver and royal blue should be adopted as the colours for the organisation. Many QCWA buildings or 'rest rooms' are painted royal blue and white to approximate the chosen colours.

In the 1930s the association held the motto "With loyalty to the Throne, service to the country, through country women, by country women, for country women". By 1950 this was given as "Honour to God, Loyalty to the Throne, Service to the country, Through country women, By country women, For country women".

A creed was also made:

I would be true, for there are those who trust me; I would be pure, for there are those who care; I would be strong for there is much to suffer; I would be brave, for there is much to dare.
I would be friend to all—the foe—the friendless; I would be giving and forget the gift; I would be humble, for I know my weakness; I would look up—and laugh—and love—and lift.

Branches were grouped within a division, within the State body. Western Division included Roma and Trenhed. The Southern Region was rearranged by 1945 to form new divisions such as the Gympie and South Burnett. The new Maranoa Division looked after 29 branches including Dalby and Wandoan.

In 1951, a branch of the QCWA was established on Samarai Island in the Australian-administered Territory of Papua and New Guinea.

Queensland's Younger Sets were formed by April 1928 in Warwick, (Note: Queensland Country Women's Association's 'Connecting and inspiring for nearly 100 years' webpage (20 February 2021) states the 'Younger set' groups were created from 1931.) with the QCWA Bundaberg Younger Set established in mid-2008. Membership is for girls and women up to 25 years-of-age, although one set in 1930 allowed 'any girl or unmarried woman' as eligible for membership.

In 2012 the QWC celebrated its 90th birthday.

The Queensland chapter was inducted into the Queensland Business Leaders Hall of Fame in 2013.

In 2017 the QWCA created its own perfume, '1922', to mark its 95th anniversary. It was released at 2017 Ekka and was developed by Damask Perfumery in Brisbane. The artwork and branding of the bottle was supplied by Brisbane watercolour artist Michelle Grayson.

In 2019 the QWCA received a Queensland Greats Award from the Queensland Government.

In 2022 the QCWA celebrated their centenary year. As part of the celebrations, in early February, the Perth Mint launched a $1 coin commemorating the centenary in Queensland and New South Wales. Other intended events were ongoing displays celebrating the achievements of early members, and attending Parliament House and raising concerns affecting women and families across Queensland.

== Branches ==
As at December 2018, the QWCA had over 240 branches throughout Queensland. The following list includes all branches active in December 2018, and some of the former branches. (Note, if dates of founding and disbanding are not known, dates of known activity/inactivity are used to assist in identifying actual founding/disbanding.)

Branch name	District	LGA	Founded	Current status	Notes	Photo
Acland	Acland	Toowoomba	1936 (active)	1996 (active)		
Adavale	Adavale	Quilpie		1938 (active)		
Gator Girls	Alligator Creek	Townsville	2015 (founded)	2020 (active)		
Allora	Allora	Southern Downs	1922 (founded)	2020 (active)		
Alpha	Alpha	Barcaldine	1927 (active)	2020 (active)		
Alton Downs	Alton Downs	Rockhampton	1927 (active)	1938 (active), 1951 (active)		
Ambrose	Ambrose	Gladstone	1927	2020 (active)		36 Gentle Annie Road, Ambrose
Amby	Amby	Maranoa	1938 (active)	2020 (active)		
Amiens	Amiens	Southern Downs		1938 (active)		
Aramac	Aramac	Barcaldine	1927 (active)	1938 (active)		
Atherton	Atherton	Tablelands	1925	2020 (active)		
Augathella	Augathella	Murweh		2020 (active)		
Ayr	Ayr	Burdekin		2020 (active)		117 Young Street, Ayr
Babinda	Babinda	Cairns	before 1928	1938 (active), 2020 (active)	Was constructing a cyclone-proof rest room in 1928.	
Banana	Banana	Banana		2020 (active)		
Dululu	?	Banana	April 1931	1939 (active)	Members originally were with the Wowan CWA before forming their own. Younger Set (1935).	
Monto-Bancroft	Bancroft	North Burnett				
Baralaba	Baralaba	Banana		1938 (active)		
Barcaldine	Barcaldine	Barcaldine	1927 (active)	2020 (active)		
Basalt	Basalt	Charters Tower	1923	2018 (inactive)		
Bauple	Bauple	Fraser Coast			Closed (as at 2018)	
Beaudesert	Beaudesert	Scenic Rim	May 1927	1952 (active)	First rest room was opened in June 1938 but burned down on 2 August 1946. A new rest room was opened in 1949. Helped form the Hillview branch (1932). A Younger Set was formed after 1949.	
Beech Mountain	Lower Beechmont	Gold Coast		2020 (active)		
Bell	Bell	Western Downs	1923 (founded)	1946 (active)		
Beenleigh	Beenleigh	Logan				
Beerwah	Beerwah	Sunshine Coast		2020 (active)		
Moggill	Bellbowrie	Brisbane		2020 (active)		
Biddeston	Biddeston	Toowoomba		1927 (active)		
Biggenden	Biggenden	North Burnett	1926	2020 (active)		
Biloela	Biloela	Banana		1938 (active)		
Biloela Younger Set	Biloela	Banana		1938 (active)		
Bingera	Bingera	Bundaberg		1938 (active)		
Blackall	Blackall	Blackall-Tambo	1927 (active)	2020 (active)		
Blackbutt	Blackbutt	South Burnett	1923 (founded)	1938 (active)	Later merged with Yarraman to become Blackbutt Yarraman. Meets at the QCWA Hall at 65 Coulson Street (26.8856°S 152.1027°E).	Blackbutt-Yarraman Queensland Country Women's Association Hall in Blackbutt, 2023
Blackwater	Blackwater	Central Highlands	1938 (active)	2020 (active)		
Bogantungan	Bogantungan	Central Highlands		1930 (active)		
Blair Athol	Blair Athol	Isaac	Before August 1927			
Bli Bli	Bli Bli	Sunshine Coast	1930			
Bluff	Bluff	Central Highlands		1938 (active)		
Bollon	Bollon	Balonne	1938 (active)	2020 (active)		
Bonshaw	Bonshaw	Goondiwindi	1949 (active)			
Boodua	Boodua	Toowoomba	1923 (founded)	1938 (active)		
Boonah	Boonah	Scenic Rim		2020 (active)	Meets at 13 Walter Street	
Boonarga	Boonarga	Western Downs		1946 (active)		
Booval	Booval	City of Ipswich	1928 (active)		Had the motto of 'service and love'.	
Boulia	Boulia	Boulia		2020 (active)		
Bowen	Bowen	Whitsunday		2020 (active)		
Bowenville	Bowenville	Toowoomba			Held their meetings at the Bowenville Public Hall.	
Boyneside	near Kumbia, Queensland		1933		Held their meetings at the Boyneside State School. Date that this branch ceased to operate is unknown.	
Broadwater	Broadwater	Southern Downs		2020 (active)		
Brookfield	Brookfield	Brisbane		2020 (active)		
Brookstead	Brookstead	Toowoomba		1928 (active), 1930 (active)		
Brooweena	Brooweena	Fraser Coast		1934 (active)		
Brosburn	Brosburn	Toowoomba		1930 (active)		
Brymaroo	Brymaroo	Toowoomba	1925 (active)	1938 (active)		
Buderim	Buderim	Sunshine Coast		1966 (active)		
Bundaberg	Bundaberg Central	Bundaberg	1938 (active)	2020 (active)		
Hinkler	Bundaberg Central	Bundaberg		2020 (active)		
Burdekin Downs	Charters Towers area	Charters Towers	1923	2018 (inactive)		
Burnett Heads	Burnett Heads	Bundaberg	1953 (active)	1984 (active)		
Burpengary Green Wattles	Burpengary	Moreton Bay		2020 (active)		
Burra Burri	Burra Burri	Western Downs	1923 (founded)		Originally a Jandowae sub-branch formed on 4 July 1923.	
Caboolture	Caboolture	Moreton Bay	1929 (founded)	2020 (active)		
Cairns	Cairns North	Cairns	1926 (founded)	1927 (active)	A rest room was built by 1927. A 'Younger Set' inaugural meeting was held at the Abbott Street rest rooms on 29 April 1930.	
Cairns Aerial Output	Cairns?	Cairns?		2020 (active)		
Calen	Calen	Mackay		2020 (active)		120 McIntyre Street, Calen
Callide Valley	Callide Valley	Banana	Before 27 August			
Calliope	Calliope	Gladstone	1925 (founded)	2020 (active)		
Caloundra	Caloundra	Sunshine Coast	1937	2020 (active)		
Cambooya	Cambooya	Toowoomba	1923 (founded)	2003 (active), 2018 (inactive)		
Canaga	Canaga	Western Downs		1946 (active)		
Cape River	Pentland	Charters Towers	1923	2018 (inactive)		
Capella	Capella	Central Highlands	Before August 1927	2020 (active)		
Smithfield	Caravonica	Cairns		2020 (active)		
Camooweal	?	Mount Isa		1927 (active)	A rest room was being built in 1927.	
Cardwell	Cardwell	Cassowary Coast	1929 (active)	2018 (inactive)		
Cecil Plains	Cecil Plains	Toowoomba		1930 (active)		
Cedar Pocket	Cedar Pocket	Gympie		2020 (active)		
Charleville	Charleville	Murweh	1930 (active)	2020 (active)		
Charters Towers	Charters Towers	Charters Towers	1923 (active)	2020 (active)		
Chermside	Chermside	Brisbane	1961 (active)	2004 (active)		
Childers	Childers	Bundaberg		2020 (active)		1 Crescent Street, Childers
Childers Younger Set	Childers	Bundaberg	1993 (active)	1995 (active)		
Chillagoe	?	Mareeba	1926	1939 (active)	Younger Set (1939)	Established at same time as Einasleigh, Watsonville, and Glen Alley.
Chinchilla	Chinchilla	Western Downs	1922 (founded)	2020 (active)		
Clayfield	Clayfield	Brisbane	1948 (active)	1995 (active)		
Clermont	Clermont	Isaac		2020 (active)		
Redlands	Cleveland	Redland	1926 (active)	2020 (active)		
Clifton	Clifton	Toowoomba	1927 (active)	2020 (active)		
Cloncurry	Cloncurry	Cloncurry		2020 (active)		
Coalstoun Lakes	Coalstoun Lakes	North Burnett	1938 (active)	1953 (active)		
Collinsville	Collinsville	Whitsunday		2020 (active)		
Columboola	Columboola	Western Downs		1938 (active)		
Columboola Younger Set	Columboola	Western Downs		1938 (active)		
Condamine	Wheatvale	Southern Downs	1924 (founded)			
Condamine-Arubial Younger Set	Condamine	Western Downs	1938 (active)	2020 (active)		
Cooktown	Cooktown	Cook		2020 (active)		
Coolangatta	Coolangatta	Gold Coast		2020 (active)	The Coolangatta and Tweed Heads CWA Younger Set was in existence by May 1930.	
Coolum Beach	Coolum Beach	Sunshine Coast	1931 (active)	1938 (active)		
Cooran	Cooran	Noosa		1938 (active)		
Cooranga North	Cooranga	Western Downs	1923 (founded)	2020 (active)		
Cooranga North Younger Set	Cooranga	Western Downs		1946 (active)		
Cooroy	Cooroy	Sunshine Coast	1933 (active)	2020 (active)		
Coorparoo	Coorparoo	Brisbane	March 1929 (founded)	1938 (active)	Was also known as Coorparoo-Greenslopes. During 1939/1940, they met at the Saint Stephen's Church of England Hall.	—
Cooyar	Cooyar	Toowoomba	1927 (active)	2001 (active)		
Cottonvale	Cottonvale	Southern Downs		1938 (active)		
Cracow	Cracow	Banana		1938 (active)		
Crediton	Crediton	Mackay	1964	1976		
Crow's Nest	Crows Nest	Toowoomba	1925	2020 (active)		
Cunnamulla	Cunnamulla	Paroo	Reformed in 1935.	1938 (active)		
Cunningham	Cunningham	Southern Downs		2020 (active)		
Dalby	Dalby	Western Downs	1927 (active)	1946 (active)		
Dalby Younger Set	Dalby	Western Downs		1946 (active)		
Springvale/Kupunn	Dalby	Western Downs				
Dalveen	Dalveen	Southern Downs	November 1924	2020 (active)	Initially opened with 24 members as a sub-branch of Condamine Valley	
Dayboro	Dayboro	Moreton Bay	1927	2020 (active)		
Deeral	Deeral	Cairns		2020 (active)		
Degilbo	Degilbo	North Burnett Region	1928 (active)			
Dimbulah	Dimbulah	Mareeba	1933	2020 (active)		
Dingo	Dingo	Central Highlands	Before August 1927	1953 (active)		
Dirranbandi	Dirranbandi	Balonne		2020 (active)		
Downfall Creek	Downfall Creek	Western Downs	1923 (founded)		Originally a Jandowae sub-branch formed on 21 July 1922, and later became the Downfall Creek Branch.	
Drayton	Drayton	Toowoomba		1927 (active)		
Drillham	Drillham	Western Downs		1946 (active)		
Duaringa	Duaringa	Central Highlands	Before August 1927			
Dulacca	Dulacca	Western Downs	1923 (founded)	1946 (active)		
Durong	Durong	South Burnett		1938 (active)		
Eagleby	Eagleby	Logan				
Earlville	Earlville	Cairns		2020 (active)		
Eidsvold	Eidsvold	North Burnett		2020 (active)		
Elgin Vale	Elgin Vale	Gympie		2020 (active)		
Emerald	Emerald	Central Highlands	1927 (active)	2020 (active)		
Emu Park	Emu Park	Livingstone	1927 (active)	2020 (active)	Before August 1927 was known as Yeppoon Emu Park branch	
Emu Vale	Emu Vale	Southern Downs	From sub-branch to full branch in 1928. 1955	2020 (active)		
Eromanga	Eromanga	Quilpie		2020 (active)		
Esk	Esk	Somerset	1923 (founded)	2020 (active)		
Eumundi	Eumundi	Sunshine Coast	1927	2020 (active)		
Fig Tree Creek	Fig Tree Creek	Cairns		1927 (active)	near Babinda	
Finch Hatton	Finch Hatton	Mackay	1989 (active)	2001 (active)		
Flying Fish Point	Flying Fish Point	Cassowary Coast		2020 (active)		
Forrest Beach	Forrest Beach	Hinchinbrook		2020 (active)		
Forsayth	Forsayth	Etheridge	1928	2020 (active)	Fourth Street, Forsayth	
Freestone	Freestone	Southern Downs	1946	active 1988	Established on 31 July 1946 with 36 initial members.	
Freshwater	Freshwater	Cairns		2020 (active)		
Magnetic Garbutt	Garbutt	Townsville		2020 (active)		42 Lancaster Street, Garbutt
Gargett	Gargett	Mackay		2020 (active)		
Gatton	Gatton	Lockyer Valley	1925 (active)	1938 (active)		
Gayndah	Gayndah	North Burnett	1923 (founded)	2020 (active)		
Gemfields	Gemfields	Central Highlands		1938 (active)		
Georgetown	Georgetown	Etheridge		2020 (active)		
Gin Gin	Gin Gin	Bundaberg	1928 (active)	1938 (active), 2020 (active)		
Giru	Giru	Burdekin	1927 (founded)	2020 (active)		
Gladfield	Gladfield	Southern Downs Region		1937 (active)		
Gladstone	Gladstone Central	Gladstone	1923 (founded)	2020 (active)		
Gladstone Younger Set	Gladstone Central	Gladstone		1938 (active)		
Glamorgan Vale	Glamorgan Vale	Somerset	1938 (active)	2020 (active)		
Glass House Mountains	Glass House Mountains	Sunshine Coast		1964 (active)		
Glen Aplin	Glen Aplin	Southern Downs		2020 (active)		
Glenarbon Beebo	Glenarbon – Beebo	Goondiwindi	1949 (founded)	1979 (active)		
Glenmorgan	Glenmorgan	Western Downs		2020 (active)		
Glenore Grove	Glenore Grove	Lockyer Valley		2020 (active)		
Goodna	Goodna	Ipswich		1938 (active)		
Goomboorian	Goomboorian	Gympie	1947 (active)	1999 (active)		
Goombungee	Goombungee	Toowoomba		2020 (active)		
Goomburra	Goomburra	Southern Downs		1927 (active)		
Goomeri	Goomeri	Gympie	1929 (active)	2018 (inactive)	A Younger Set was formed in 1939.	
Goondiwindi	Goondiwindi	Goondiwindi	1927 (active)	1992 (active)	A 'Junior CWA' was formed by 1928, for females of 16 to 20 years of age.	
Gootchie	Gootchie	Fraser Coast	1935 (active)	1953 (active)		
Goovigen	Goovigen	Banana	1932	2017	Their rooms are at 5 Stanley Street (24.1462°S 150.2864°E). It stands idle.	
Gordonvale	Gordonvale	Cairns	1927 (active)	2020 (inactive)	Their hall is at 92 Norman Street (17.0934°S 145.7860°E). It continues to be used for community purposes.	
Gore	Gore	Goondiwindi	1923 (planning) 1925 (active)	1927 (active) 2018 (inactive)		
Gracemere	Gracemere	Rockhampton		2020 (active)		
Grantham	?	Lockyer Valley		1933 (active)		
Gregory	Gregory	Burke		2020 (active)		
Gurgeena	Gurgeena	North Burnett	1956 (active)	1972 (active)		
Gurulmundi	Gurulmundi	Western Downs	1946 (active)	2018 (active)		
Gympie	Gympie	Gympie	1938 (active)	2020 (active)		
Haden	Haden	Toowoomba	1928 (active)	1938 (active), 1998 (active)		
Haigslea	Haigslea	Ipswich		1938 (active)		
Halifax	Halifax	Hinchinbrook		2020 (active)		
Harlaxton	Harlaxton	Toowoomba	1925 (active)	1938 (active)		
Harrami	Harrami	North Burnett	1952 (founded)	1999 (active), by 2023 (closed)	On the eastern side of Harrami Road (approx 24.7621°S 150.6394°E).	
Harristown	Harristown	Toowoomba	1924 (founded)	1938 (active)		
Harrisville	Harrisville	Scenic Rim	1928 (active)	2020 (active)		Queen Street
Hebel	Hebel	Balonne	1925			
Helidon	Helidon	Lockyer Valley		2018 (inactive)		
Herberton	Herberton	Tablelands	1925	2020 (active)		
Highfields	Highfields	Toowoomba	2017	2020 (active)		
Hillview	Hillview	Scenic Rim	1932	1938 (active)	Formed with help from Beaudesert branch.	
Hivesville	Hivesville	South Burnett	1923 (founded)	2020 (active)		
Home Hill	Home Hill	Burdekin	1938 (active)	1946 (active)	A rest room was being built in 1927.	
Howard	Howard	Fraser Coast		2020 (active)		
Howard Younger Set	Howard	Fraser Coast	1992 (active)	1994 (active)		
Hughenden	Hughenden	Flinders		2020 (active)		
Imbil	Imbil	Gympie		2020 (active)		
Ingham	Ingham	Hinchinbrook		1938 (active)	A rest room was built by 1927. A Younger Set was formed in 1934.	
Inglestone	Inglestone	Western Downs		2020 (active)		
Inglewood	Inglewood	Goondiwindi	Formed in 1928. 1947 (active)		A ball was held at Omanama.	
Innisfail	Innisfail	Cassowary Coast		1953 (active)	A rest room was being built in 1927.	
Innisfail Younger Set	Innisfail	Cassowary Coast	1952 (active)	1962 (active)		
Injune	Injune	Maranoa	1924 (active)	2001 (active)		
Ipswich	Ipswich	Ipswich	1934 (active)	2020 (active)		84 Limestone Street
Irvingdale	Irvingdale	Toowoomba		1927 (active)		
Jackson	Jackson	Maranoa	1938 (active)	2020 (active)		
Jambin	Jambin	Banana		2020 (active)		
Jandowae	Jandowae	Western Downs	1923 (founded)	1946 (active)		
Jinghi Valley	Jandowae	Western Downs		2020 (active)		
Jericho	Jericho	Barcaldine	1927 (active)	2020 (active)		
Jondaryan	Jondaryan	Toowoomba		1930 (active)		
Julia Creek	Julia Creek	McKinlay	1926 (active)	2020 (active)	A rest room was built by 1927.	53 Burke Street (Flinders Highway), Julia Creek
Kaimkillenbun (Yamsion – Kaimkillenbun)	Kaimkillenbun	Western Downs	1938 (active)	1946 (active)	Known as Yamsion Kaimkillenbun in 1938	
Kairi	Kairi	Tablelands		1938 (active)		
Kalapa	Kalapa	Rockhampton	1931	2020 (active)		
Kalkie	Kalkie	Bundaberg	1953 (active)	1966 (active)		
Kallangur	Kallangur	Moreton Bay		2020 (active)		
Kangaroo Point	Kangaroo Point	Brisbane		1938 (active)		
Karara	Karara	Southern Downs		2018 (active)		
Kareewa	Pomona / Cootharaba	Noosa	1924 (founded)			
Karaweena	Cooranga	Western Downs Region	1928 (active)	1937 (active)		
Kenmore	Kenmore	Brisbane				
Kenmore Twilight sub-branch	Kenmore	Brisbane		2020 (active)		
Kenilworth	Kenilworth	Sunshine Coast	1955 (active)	2018 (inactive)		
Kilcoy	Kilcoy	Somerset		2020 (active)		
Kilkivan	Kilkivan	Gympie		2020 (active)		
Killarney	Killarney	Southern Downs	1924 (founded)	2020 (active)		
Kindon	Kindon	Goondiwindi	1954			
Kingaroy	Kingaroy	South Burnett	1922 (founded)	2020 (active)	Meets at Kingaroy CWA Hall at 122–124 Kingaroy Street (26.5422°S 151.8394°E).	
Kingaroy Twilight	Kingaroy	South Burnett		2020 (active)	Meets at Kingaroy CWA Hall at 122 Kingaroy Street.	
Kingsthorpe	Kingsthorpe	Toowoomba		2020 (active)		
Willows	Kirwan	Townsville		2020 (active)		
Kokotungo	Kokotungo	Banana	1957 (active)	1971 (active)		
Komine	Komine	Maranoa	1924 (active)	1938 (active)	Known as Komine-Gunnewin in 1938	
Koolboo	Koolbo	Bundaberg		1938 (active)		
Kooroongarra	Kooroongarra	Toowoomba	1924 (founded)	1925 (active)		
Koumala	Koumala	Mackay	1928	2020 (active)	Formed by members from Sarina branch.	33 Brown Street, Koumala
Kowguran	Kowguran	Western Downs		1938 (active)		
Kulara	Kulara	Tablelands		1926 (founded)		
Kumbia	Kumbia	South Burnett		2020 (active)		
Kuranda	Kuranda	Mareeba	1938 (active)	2020 (active)		
Laidley	Laidley	Lockyer Valley	1923 (founded)	1927 (active) 2018 (inactive)		
Langlo Crossing	Langlo Crossing	Murweh		1938 (active)		
Lawgi	Lawgi Dawes	Banana	1996 (active)	2003 (active)		
Lethebrook	?	Whitsunday	1924	1928 (reorganised)		
Leyburn	Leyburn	Southern Downs	1927 (active)	2020 (active)	Hall built in 1928	
Abergowrie / Long Pocket	Long Pocket	Hinchinbrook		2020 (active)		
Longreach	Longreach	Longreach	1925 (active)	2020 (active)		
Lowmead	Lowmead	Gladstone		1938 (active)		
Lowood	Lowood	Somerset		2020 (active)		
Macalister	Macalister	Western Downs	1927 (active)	2020 (active)		
Machine Creek	Machine Creek	Gladstone	1931 (active)	1937 (active)		
Mackay	Mackay	Mackay	1938 (active)	2020 (active)		
Mackay Younger Set	Mackay	Mackay	1930, 1938 (active)	1954 (active)		
Maclagan (Quinalow Maclagan)	Maclagan	Toowoomba	1927 (active)	1938 (active) 2018 (inactive)	In 1938 known as Quinalow Maclagan.	
Maidenwell	Maidenwell	South Burnett	1938 (active)	2020 (active)		
Malakoff	Dalby	Callide		1952 (active)		
Malanda	Malanda	Tablelands	1925 (founded)	2020 (active)		
Maleny	Maleny	Sunshine Coast	1928–1929	2020 (active)		
Mango Hill	Mango Hill	Moreton Bay				
Marburg	Marburg	Ipswich		1938 (active)		
Mareeba	Mareeba	Mareeba		2020 (active)		
Marlborough	Marlborough	Livingstone	Before August 1927		Also known as the Marlborough-Ogmore Branch.	
Marmor	Marmor	Rockhampton	1950s			
Maroochydore	Maroochydore	Sunshine Coast		2020 (active)		
Maryborough	Maryborough	Fraser Coast	1938 (active)	2020 (active)		
Maryborough Younger Set	Maryborough	Fraser Coast		1937 (active)		
McKinlay	McKinlay	McKinlay	1926 (active), 1938 (active)	2020 (active)	In 1927, the branch built a nurses's cottage.	22 Middleton Street, McKinlay
Mermaid Beach	Mermaid Beach	Gold Coast		2020 (active)		
Metropolitan	Brisbane City	Brisbane	1923 (founded)	1938 (active)		
Miles	Miles	Western Downs	1924 (founded)	2020 (active)		
Millaa Millaa	Millaa Millaa	Tablelands	1927 (founded)	2020 (active)		
Millmerran	Millmerran	Toowoomba	1924 (founded)	2004 (active), 2018 (inactive)		
Minbun	Minbun	Tablelands	1928 (active)	1939 (active)		
Mingela	Mingela	Charters Towers				
Miriam Vale / Bororen	Miriam Vale	Gladstone	1938 (active)	2020 (active)		c. 28 Blomfield Street, Miriam Vale
Mirriwinni	?	Cairns		1949 (active)		
Mitchell	Mitchell	Maranoa	1923 (founded)	2020 (active)		
Miva	Miva	Gympie	1928	2020 (active)		
Monto Bancroft	Monto	North Burnett	1938 (active)	2020 (active)		
Montville	Montville	Sunshine Coast	1924			
Moonford	Moonford	North Burnett		2020 (active)		
Moonie River	Moonie	Goondiwindi	October 1950	1999 (active)	Formed from the Tara branch.	
Moranbah	Moranbah	Isaac		2020 (active)		
Morella	Morella	Longreach	October 1944	2020 (active)	Initially the Morella branch met at the Hereward and Tandara homesteads.	
Morven	Morven	Murweh	1928 (active)	1938 (active), 2018 (active)		
Mossman	Mossman	Douglas		2020 (active)		
Mount Abundance	Mount Abundance	Maranoa		1938 (active)		
Mount Colliery	Mount Colliery	Southern Downs		2020 (active)		
Mount Crosby	Mount Crosby	Brisbane		1938 (active)		
Mount Garnet	Mount Garnet	Tablelands		2020 (active)		
Copper City Mount Isa	Mount Isa City	Mount Isa	1938 (active)	2020 (active)		
Mount Larcom	Mount Larcom	Gladstone		2020 (active)		
Mount Mee	Mount Mee	Moreton Bay		1926 (disbanded)	Small branch disbanded	
Mount Molloy	Mount Molloy	Mareeba		2020 (active)		
Mount Morgan	Mount Morgan	Rockhampton		2020 (active)		
Centenary	Mount Ommaney	Brisbane				
Mount Perry	Mount Perry	North Burnett		2020 (active)		
Mount Tyson	Mount Tyson	Toowoomba		1930 (active)		
Muckadilla	Muckadilla	Maranoa	1929			
Mulgildie	Mulgildie	North Burnett	1938 (active)	2020 (active)		
Mulgowie	Mulgowie	Lockyer Valley	1927 (active)	1938 (active)		
Mundubbera	Mundubbera	North Burnett	1953 (active)	2020 (active)		
Mungallala	Mungallala	Maranoa	1923 (founded)	1938 (active)		
Murgon	Murgon	South Burnett	1924 (founded)	1938 (active)		
Muttaburra	Muttaburra	Barcaldine	1927 (founded)	2020 (active)		
Nambour	Nambour	Sunshine Coast	1928–1929	2020 (active)		
Nanango	Nanango	South Burnett		2020 (active)		
Nangwee	Nangwee	Toowoomba	1930 (active)	1938 (active)		
Nelia	Nelia	McKinlay	1924	2020 (active)	A hall was paid off by 1927.	Railway Street, Nelia
Nerang	Nerang	Gold Coast		2020 (active)		
Newtown	?	Toowoomba North		1938 (active)		
Nobby	Nobby	Toowoomba	1925 (founded)	1938 (active), 2018 (inactive)	First president was Sister Elizabeth Kenny	
Normanton	Normanton	Carpentaria		2020 (active)		
Eton / Eton North	North Eton	Mackay		2020 (active)		
North Ward–Belgian Gardens	?	Townsville	April 1946	1949 (active)		
Norwin	Norwin	Toowoomba	1930 (active)	2018 (active)		
Oakey	Oakey	Toowoomba	1926 (active)	2020 (active)		
Oakwood	Oakwood	Bundaberg		2020 (active)		
Coomera	Oxenford	Gold Coast	1928 (active)	2020 (active)		
Oonoonba	Townsville	Townsville	1928	1930 (active)	A rest room was built by 1927.	
Oxley	Oxley	Brisbane		2020 (active)	Day and night groups	
Palmwoods	Palmwoods	Sunshine Coast	1935 (active)	2020 (active)	The hall was officially opened by Frank Nicklin on 27 November 1937. It cost £156.	
Peachester	Peachester	Sunshine Coast		2020 (active)		
Peak Crossing	Peak Crossing	Scenic Rim	1935	1938 (active)	The branch meets at the Peak Crossing Public Hall.	
Pentland	Pentland	Charters Towers	1923	2018 (inactive)		
Peranga	Peranga	Toowoomba		1938 (active)		
Pilton	?	Condamine		1933 (active)		
Pine Rivers	Petrie	Moreton Bay	1938	2020 (active)		
Point Vernon / Pialba	Pialba	Fraser Coast		2020 (active)		
Pratten	Pratten	Southern Downs Region	1928 (active)			
Rosslea	Pimlico	Townsville		2020 (active)		
Townsville	Pimlico	Townsville	1938 (active)	2020 (active)		
Beauaraba	Pittsworth	Toowoomba		2020 (active)		
Pirrinuan	Dalby	Callide	July 1925			
Pittsworth	Pittsworth	Toowoomba	1927 (active)	2000 (active)	A Younger Set was formed in June 1930.	
Port Douglas	Port Douglas	Douglas	1938 (active)	2020 (active)		
Prairie	Prairie	Flinders	1930 (active)	2018 (inactive)		
Middle Ridge	Preston	Toowoomba	1938 (active)	2020 (active)		
Proserpine	Proserpine	Whitsunday		2020 (active)		4 Faust Street, Proserpine
Prospect Creek	Prospect Creek	Banana	1959 (active)	1989 (active)		
Proston	Proston	South Burnett	1935 (active)	2020 (active)		
Quilpie	Quilpie	Quilpie	1926 (active)	2020 (active)		
Raglan	?	Gladstone		1951 (active)		
Ravenshoe	Ravenshoe	Tablelands	1925, 1927 (active)	2020 (active)	A rest room was built by 1927.	
Ravenswood	?	Charters Towers		1932 (active)	In 1932, the CWA met at the School of Arts.	
Redcliffe	Redcliffe	Moreton Bay	1927 (active)	1938 (active)		
Richmond	Richmond	Richmond	1927 (active), 1938 (active)	2020 (active)		
Ridgelands	Ridgelands	Rockhampton	1937	2020 (active)		
Rockhampton	Rockhampton	Rockhampton	1923 (founded)	1938 (active)		
Rockmount-Stockyard	Rockmount-Stockyard	Lockyer Valley	1933	1974 (active)		
Roma	Roma	Maranoa	1922 (founded)	2020 (active)	The Branch maintained a hostel in the 1940s.	
Rosedale	Rosedale	Gladstone	1938 (active)	2020 (active)		
Rosewood	Rosewood	Ipswich	1938 (active)	2020 (active)		
Rosslea	Rosslea	Townsville				
Samford	Samford Village	Moreton Bay	1964	2020 (active)		
Nebo / Sarina Range	Sarina Range	Mackay		2020 (active)	QCWA Hall, 1994 Sarina-Marlborough Road	
Sarina	Sarina	Mackay	1938 (active)	2020 (active)		2 Brewers Road, Sarina
Seaforth	Seaforth	Mackay		2020 (active)		
Sandgate	Shorncliffe	Brisbane	1926 (active)	2020 (active)	Linga Longa QCWA holiday home (1925–1967) 254 Flinders Parade, Sandgate.	
Silkstone-Booval	Silkstone /Booval	Ipswich		1938 (active)		Cameron Park, Easton Street, Booval
Silkwood	Silkwood	Cassowary Coast		2020 (active)		
Somerset Dam	Somerset Dam	Somerset		1938 (active)		
South Kolan	South Kolan	Bundaberg		1938 (active)		
South Yaamba	South Yaamba	Rockhampton		1938 (active), 1951 (active)		
Southbrook	Southbrook	Toowoomba		1938 (active)		
Southport	Southport	Gold Coast	June 1928		Initial meetings were held on the third Thursday of each month, at the School of Arts building.	
Brisbane City Night	Spring Hill	Brisbane				
Springsure	Springsure	Central Highlands		2020 (active)		
Springvale / Kupunn	Springvale	Banana		2020 (active)		
St George	St George	Balonne	1938 (active)	2020 (active)		
St Lawrence	St Lawrence	Isaac		1938 (active)		
Stanthorpe	Stanthorpe	Southern Downs	1923 (founded)	2020 (active)		
Stratford	Stratford	Cairns		1938 (active)		
Stuart	?	Townsville	1928		Original name of Stewart's Creek.	
Sunnybank Coopers Plains	Sunnybank	Brisbane	1953	2020 (active)		—
Surat	Surat	Maranoa	1925 (founded)	1988 (active)		
Talwood	Talwood	Goondiwindi	1949 (founded)	1996 (active)		
Tambo	Tambo	Blackall-Tambo	1938 (active)	2020 (active)		
Tamborine Mountain	Tamborine Mountain	Scenic Rim	1928 (active)	1960 (active)	Originally known as Tambourine Mountain.	
Tannum Sands	Tannum Sands	Gladstone		2020 (active)		
Tara	Tara	Western Downs		1946 (active)		
Taroom	Taroom	Banana	1924 (founded)	1946 (active)		
Taroom Younger Set	Taroom	Banana	1946 (active)	1965 (active)		
Tewantin Noosa	Tewantin	Noosa	mid-1927	2020 (active)	Rest-room opened in March 1930, seaside cottage opened in November 1934. A Younger Set was still in existence by June 1971.	
Texas	Texas	Goondiwindi	1928 (active)	2020 (active)		
Thallon-Daymar	Thallon	Balonne	1957	2020 (active)		
Thangool	Thangool	Banana	1938 (active)	2020 (active)		
Hermitage-Yangan	The Hermitage	Southern Downs	1928 (active, as Yangan)	2020 (active)		
The Summit	The Summit	Southern Downs		1938 (active)		
Theodore	Theodore	Banana		2018 (inactive)	Closed (as at 2018)	
Thuringowa	Thuringowa	Townsville	1922			
Thursday Island	Thursday Island	Torres		1938 (active)		
Tiaro	Tiaro	Fraser Coast		2020 (active)		
Tin Can Bay	Tin Can Bay	Gympie		2020 (active)		
Tinana	Tinana	Fraser Coast				
Tingoora	Tingoora	South Burnett		1934 (active)		
Tolga	Tolga	Tablelands	1925	2020 (active)		
Toobeah	Toobeah	Goondiwindi	1952 (active)	1990 (active)		
Toogoolawah	Toogoolawah	Somerset	1923 (founded)	1938 (active)	Proposed a rest home in 1928.	
Toowong	Toowong	Brisbane		1938 (active)		
Toowoomba	Toowoomba City	Toowoomba	1923 (founded)	2020 (active)		263 Margaret St, Toowoomba
Toowoomba City Business Women	Toowoomba City	Toowoomba		2020 (active)		
Toowoomba Younger Set	Toowoomba City	Toowoomba		1938 (active)		
Townsville	Townsville	Townsville	1923 (founded)	2020 (active)		
Trenhed	Trenhed	Maranoa		1938 (active)	Near Roma in the Yalebone area. Also had a Younger Set in 1947. Ran a seed and plant nursery in McDowall Street, Roma.	
Tully	Tully	Cassowary Coast	1926 (active)	2020 (active)	Younger Set in existence by September 1930.	
Boyne Valley	Ubobo	Gladstone	1935 (founded)	2020 (active)	In 1958 the Many Peaks Post Office building was relocated to Ububo to become the QCWA building, officially opened in 1959.	
Upper Lockyer/Withcott	Upper Lockyer	Lockyer Valley		2020 (active)		
Upper Stone	Upper Stone	Hinchinbrook		2020 (active)		
Urandangie	Urandangie	Boulia	1924 (founded)		A hall was paid off by 1927.	
Urangan	Urangan	Fraser Coast		2020 (active)		
Valentine Plains	Valentine Plains	Banana				
Victoria Hill	Victoria Hill	Southern Downs		2020 (active)		
Wallan Creek	Wallan Creek	Western Downs				
Wallangarra	Wallangarra	Southern Downs		2020 (active)		
Wallaville	Wallaville	Bundaberg	1938 (active)	2020 (active)		
Walloon	Walloon	Ipswich		2020 (active)		
Wallumbilla	Wallumbilla	Maranoa	1923 (founded)	2020 (active)		
Wandal	?	Rockhampton		1951 (active)		
Wandoan	Wandoan	Western Downs		1946 (active)		
Wandoan Younger Set	Wandoan	Western Downs	1960 (active)	1962 (active)		
East Palmerston	Wangan	Cassowary Coast		2020 (active)		
Warra	Warra	Western Downs	1927 (active)	2020 (active)		
Warwick	Warwick	Southern Downs	1928 (active)		Formed a Younger Set in April 1928. Daughter branch was Condamine Valley.	
Condamine Valley Warwick	Warwick	Southern Downs	1922 (founded)	2020 (active)		
Weir River	Weir River	Western Downs	1957 (active)	1961 (active)		
Westbrook	Westbrook	Toowoomba		1927 (active)		
Willowburn	Willowburn	Toowoomba	August 1927	1938 (active)	Initially held on the first Tuesday of each month.	
Winton	Winton	Winton	1927 (active)	2020 (active)	"one of the earliest formed branches"	
Upper Lockyer/Withcott	Withcott	Lockyer Valley				
Wondai	Wondai	South Burnett	1923 (founded)	2020 (active)		
Wonglepong	Wonglepong	Scenic Rim	1938 (active)	2020 (active)		
Woocoo	Woocoo	Fraser Coast		1938 (active)		
Woodford	Woodford	Moreton Bay		1938 (active)		
Woodstock	Woodstock	Townsville		2020 (active)		
Clontarf	Woody Point	Moreton Bay		2020 (active)		
Woleebe	Woleebe	Western Downs		1938 (active)		
Woolooga	Woolooga	Gympie	1933 (active)	1938 (active)		
Woombye	Woombye	Sunshine Coast	1930 (active)	1967 (active)		
Wooroolin	Wooroolin	South Burnett	1938 (active)	2020 (active)		
Springbrook Mudgeeraba	Worongary	Gold Coast		2020 (active)		
Wowan	?	Callide	c. 1926	1953(active)	Dululu branch formed from the Wowan branch in 1931	
Wyandra	Wyandra	Paroo		1925 (active)		
Wychie	Wychie	Western Downs		2020 (active)		
Wynnum	Wynnum	Brisbane	November 1925 (founded)	1938 (active)	Also known as the Wynnum-Manly-Lota branch (1925). A Younger Set of the Wynnum, Manly, and Lota branch was in existence by August 1930.	
Bay Belles	Wynnum	Brisbane		2020 (active)		
Wynnum North	Wynnum North	Brisbane	1951 (active)	1997 (active)		
Yamsion (Square Top)	Yamsion	Western Downs	1927 (active)		later merges with Kaimkillenbun	
Yandaran	Yandaran	Bundaberg		2020 (active)		
Yandina	Yandina	Sunshine Coast	1938 (active)	2020 (active)		
Blackbutt / Yarraman	Yarraman	Toowoomba	1928 (active, as Yarraman), 1938 (active)	2020 (active)	Known as Yarraman in 1938. Meets at the QCWA Hall at 65 Coulson Street, Blackbutt (26.8856°S 152.1027°E).	
Yarwun-Targinnie	Yarwun-Targinnie	Gladstone	1946 (active)	1948 (active)		
Yelarbon	Yelarbon	Goondiwindi	1928 (active)	1940 (active), 2003 (active)		
Yeppoon	Yeppoon	Livingstone	1927 (active)	1938 (active)	Part of the Yeppoon Emu Park branch initially	
Annerley-Yeronga	Yeronga	Brisbane	by October 1928 (founded)	1938 (active), 2020 (active)	A Younger Set was formed in June 1947.	9 School Road, Yeronga
Yuleba	Yuleba	Maranoa	1938 (active)	2018 (inactive)		
Yungaburra	Yungaburra	Tablelands		2020 (active)		

== Homes ==
Several CWAs maintained and built houses for the use of visiting members, including:

- Brisbane: 'Linga Longa' seaside home, Lower Esplanade, Sandgate, purchased in 1925 by the Metropolitan Branch.

'All members of the C.W.A., except those in the Metropolitan area, are eligible to spend a holiday at the home, but preference is always given to Western women and to sick and necessitous cases.'

- Brisbane: 'Lota Cottage' seaside home, Lota, with views to Moreton Bay's islands, was donated by the family as a memorial to a Queensland pioneer, Mrs Mylne, in 1924;
- Dalby: the 'Shack', Mount Mowbullan, Bunya Mountains, from 1928. By 1951, it was proposed to be sold due to the cost to maintain; It was managed by the Dalby District CWA.
- Gold Coast: holiday cottage, Tamborine Mountain, by 1929;
- Gold Coast: Southport Cottage, owned by the Saint George branch. The Broad Street building on stilts had four rooms and a sleep-out verandah, originally two cottages on Stradbroke Island, was in use by November 1936, but officially opened in January 1938;
- Redcliffe, obtained by 1923, and the first-ever glimpse of the sea by members and families;
- Townsville: Pioneer Women's Memorial Building seaside huts, Mitchell Street, Kissing Point, Townsville, by 1929. This included a 'sharkproof' enclosure for swimming;
- Western: a 'tourist shack', Bandana station, Carnarvon Creek, with two bedrooms and three beds in each, a bathroom, kitchen, and laundry tubs. This was opened in September 1947, and maintained by the Trenhed branch.

== Hostels ==
At the 1945 State Conference in Brisbane the two following resolutions carried: "That the QCWA adopt a hostel scheme throughout the State," and "Now that the Government has placed certain of the Western hospitals under board control, it would be a comfort to expectant mothers of the West if the Government would include hostels for these waiting mothers in the Hospitals Board scheme."

The following list does not include hostels managed, but not owned, by the QCWA.

=== Locations circa 1934 ===
- Burnett Street, Bundaberg (for boys)
- Herbert Street, Goondiwindi
- Stanthorpe
- Albion Street, Warwick (for girls)

=== Locations circa 1941 ===
- Burnett Street, Bundaberg (for students)
- Paulina McManus Memorial Home, The Esplanade, Cairns
- Herbert Street, Goondiwindi
- Albion Street, Warwick

=== Locations circa 1949 ===
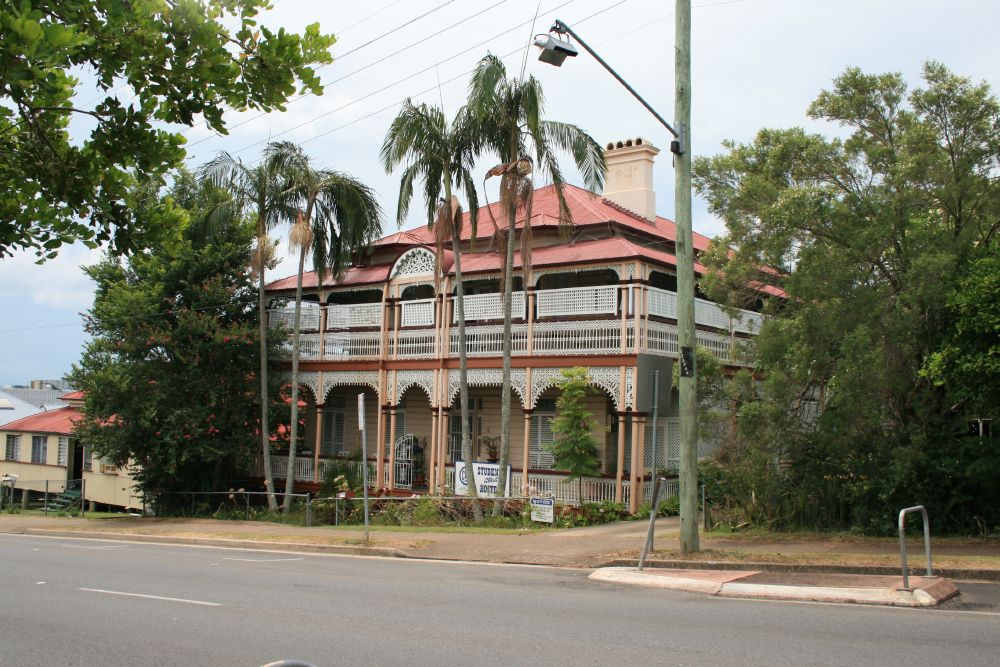
Queensland Country Women's Association Girls' Hostel, 5 Brisbane Street, Ipswich. Previously part of Oakdale Private Hospital. (2009)

- Alpha
- Gregory Terrace, Brisbane (opened 1943 – formerly Holyrood Private Hospital)
- War Memorial Students' Hostel, Richmond Hill, Charters Towers (for boys)
- Herbert Street, Goondiwindi
- Mary Tregear Women's Hostel, 84 Limestone Street, Ipswich
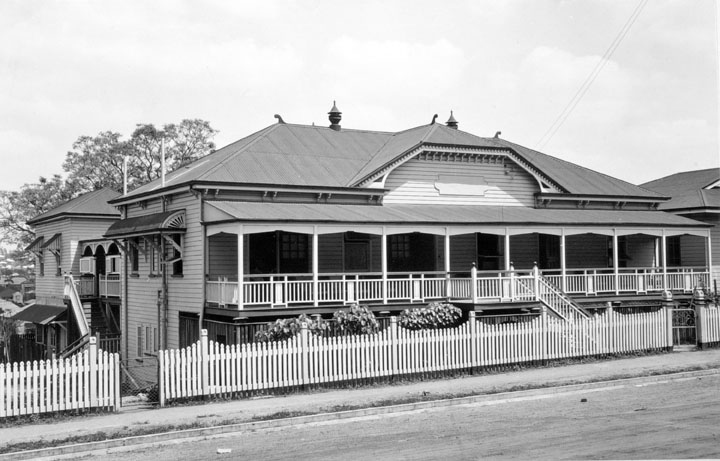
  West Moreton Division C.W.A. Students' Hostel for boys, 6 Milford Street, Ipswich Queensland. Previously part of Oakdale Private Hospital. November 1946
- Students' Hostel, Brisbane Street, Ipswich (for girls)
- Students' Hostel, Milford Street, Ipswich (for boys)
- Lockyer Women's Hostel, Laidley
- Shannon House, Eagle Street, Longreach
- Mackay
- Archer Street, Rockhampton (formerly St Kilda Guest House)
- Roma (for boys)
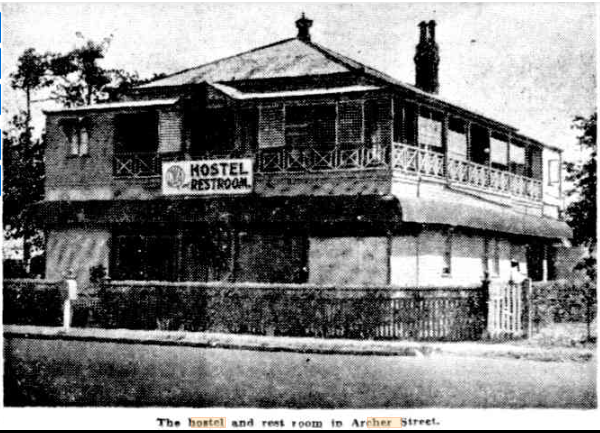
  QCWA Hostel and Restroom, Archer Street, Rockhampton. Previously St Kilda Guest House. 1949
- Roma (for girls)
- St George
- Stanthorpe (for students)
- The Kathleen Parr Student Hostel, Tambo
- 26 Mitchell Street, North Ward, Townsville
- Tully
- Palmerin Street, Warwick

=== Locations circa 1959 ===
- The Ainsley Templeton Hostel, Alpha
- Ayr (for students)
- Templeton House, Barcaldine Mothers' Hostel, Fir Street, Barcaldine
- Callide Valley Hostel, Biloela
- Margaret Young Mothers Hostel, Blackall
- 52 Herbert Street, Bowen
- 91 Gregory Terrace, Brisbane
- Galatea Street, Charleville
- Prior Street, Charters Towers
- 1 Annie Street, Dalby
- Kirby Street, Dirranbandi
- Herbert Street, Goondiwindi
- CWA Students' Memorial Hostel, Goondiwindi (for students)
- Channon Street, Gympie
- Mowbray Street, Hughenden
- 5 Brisbane Street, Ipswich
- Mary Tregear Women's Hostel, 84 Limestone Street, Ipswich
- Byrne Street, Julia Creek
- Rose Street, Kilcoy
- 103 Kingaroy Street, Kngaroy
- Lockyer Women's Hostel, William Street, Laidley
- Shannon House, Longreach
- Gordon Street, Mackay
- Lloyd Street, Mareeba
- Cambridge Street, Mitchell
- Monto and District Students' Hostel, Monto
- Isa Street, Mount Isa
- Muttaburra
- Nambour Students' Jubilee Hostel, Nambour (for students – opened 1951)
- Archer Street, Rockhampton
- St George
- Railway Street, Stanthorpe
- The Kathleen Parr Student Hostel, Tambo
- Mallalieu House, Toowong
- Memorial Hostel, Denham Street, corner of Walker Street, Townsville
- Tully
- Palmerin Street, Warwick
- Winton Mothers' Hostel
- Winton (for students)

=== Locations circa 1969 ===
- Chippendale Street, Ayr
- Blackall
- Herbert Street, Bowen
- Gregory Terrace, Brisbane
- ‘The Lodge’ Trainee Teachers’ Hostel’, Boundary Street, Brisbane
- Galatea Street, Charleville
- Cloncurry
- 1 Annie Street, Dalby
- Gayndah
- McLean Street, Goondiwindi (for students)
- Gympie
- Mowbray Street, Hughenden
- Great Road, Inglewood (opened November 1950)
- Mary Tregear Women's Hostel, 84 Limestone Street, Ipswich
- 5 Brisbane Street, Ipswich
- Kilcoy
- 103 Kingaroy Street, Kngaroy
- Lockyer Women's Hostel, William Street, Laidley
- 119 Crane Street, Longreach
- 115 Kingfisher Street, Longreach
- Gordon Street, Mackay
- Isa Street, Mount Isa
- Muttaburra
- Archer Street, Rockhampton
- Feather Street, Roma
- Victoria Street, Saint George
- Porphyry Street, Springsure
- 69 William Street, Surat
- Tambo
- 20 Arthur Street, Toowoomba
- Memorial Hostel, Denham Street, corner of Walker Street, Townsville
- Palmerin Street, Warwick
- Winton (for students)

== Honours ==
In 1935 Fairfax was appointed an Officer of the British Empire in recognition of her service.

Alice Berry was promoted from Officer (OBE) of the Order of the British Empire to Dame Commander (DBE) of the order on 1 January 1960 for "services to country women".

On 11 June 1960 in the Queen's Birthday Honours List, Honoria Christina Atherton was awarded the Order of the British Empire – Officer (Civil) (Imperial) "in recognition of service to the Qld Country Women's Association."

On 9 June 2003 in the Queen's Birthday Honours List, Jean Eva Anderson of Ballater Station at Stamford was awarded the Medal of the Order of Australia for her "service to the community of Hughenden, particularly through the Country Womens Association". She had given 52 years of service to the Hughenden branch. Her award was presented to her by the then Governor of Queensland, Quentin Bryce.
