= RAAF Area Explosives Reserve, Kowguran =

Former military installation in Queensland, Australia

3CR, Kowguran Queensland
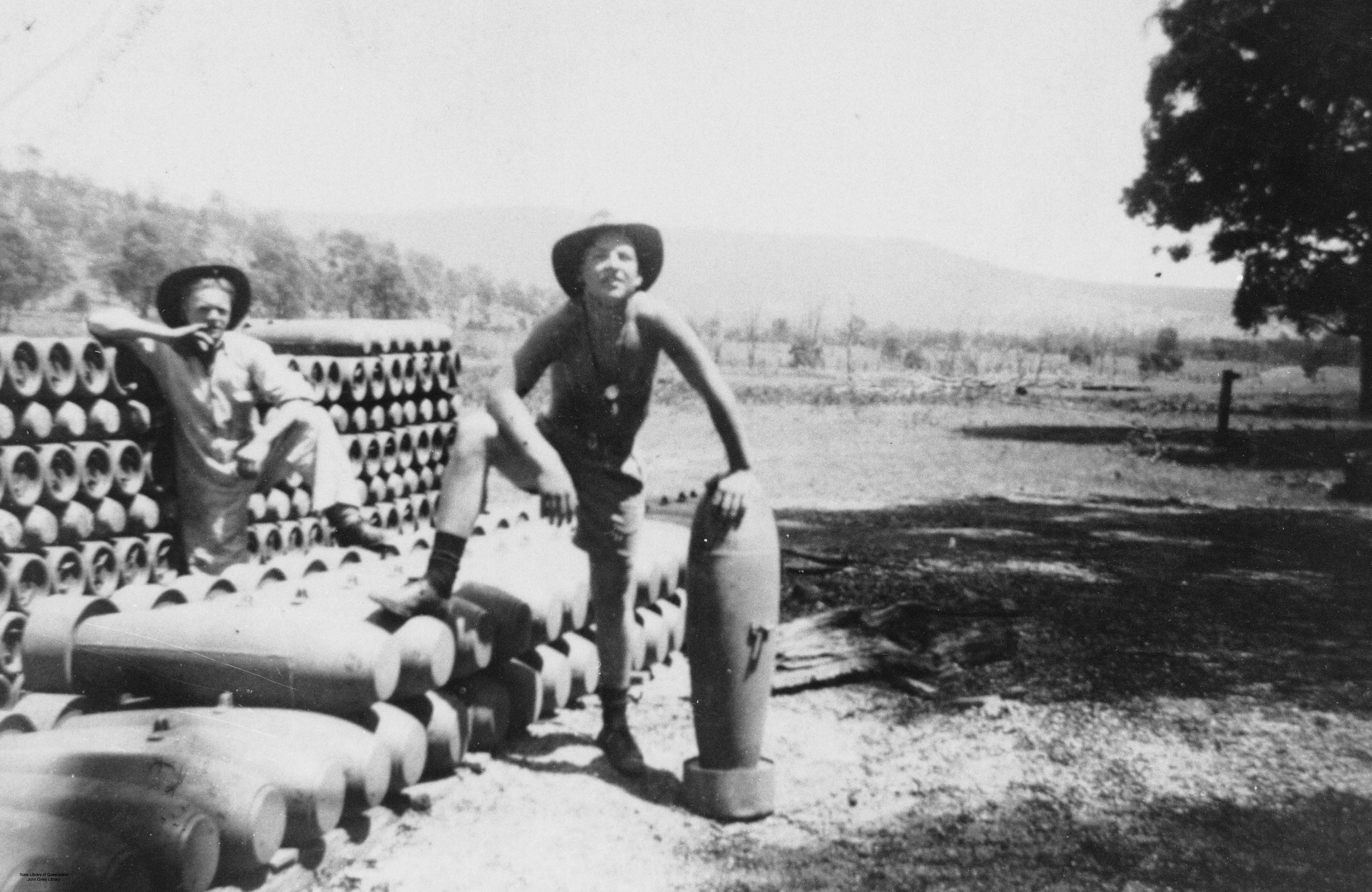
- Two Air Force workers stacking explosives at Kowguran

- Coordinates: 26°30′06″S 150°05′58″E
- Postcode(s): 4415
- Time zone: AEST (UTC+10:00)
- LGA(s): Western Downs Region

RAAF Area Explosives Reserve, Kowguran, also known as 3 Central Reserve (RAAF) or 3CR, was a World War II Royal Australian Air Force explosive ordnance depot built beside the Leichhardt Highway in central Queensland, Australia, in the locality of Kowguran, about 20 km north of Miles.

== Development ==
Approval was granted in September 1942 to construct the Reserve depot at Kowguran. The Queensland Main Roads Commission built the complex. 59 men were employed on this project.

A 16 ft (4.9 m) wide road was constructed from the depot to the Wandoan railway line. 10 ft (3.0 m) wide roads were built around the complex, linking the 20 bunkers, a main building, and accommodation huts. A parade ground was also established.

The cost was estimated at £22,723 (2019 A$1,715,290).

== Use ==
The Area Explosives Reserve was manned by 3 Central Reserve (RAAF) which was formed at Kowguran on 18 August 1943.

The depot could hold up to 2,500 long tons (2,500 t) of ordnance.

The site was decommissioned in 1956.

== Post RAAF ==
In 1985, David and Julie Hinds purchased the 135 hectare property. It was renamed "Possum Park" and was made into a holiday destination, converting four of the bunkers into self-contained underground motel units. There are also train carriages converted to motel rooms, and powered caravan sites. As of 2020, the Hinds still own the property, and live in one of the converted, underground bunkers.
