= Miles Historical Village and Museum =

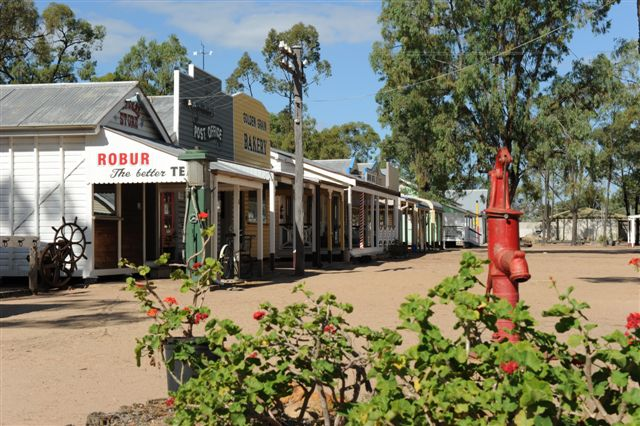
- Main street of the Miles Historical Village
- Established: 1971
- Location: Miles, Queensland
- Coordinates: 26.659°S 150.197°E
- Type: Open-air museum
- Website: www.mhv.org.au

The Miles Historical Village and Museum is an open-air museum located near the town of Miles, Western Downs Region, Queensland, Australia. The village consists of 30 buildings, replicas of ones built during the time period of the 1920s.

== Region history ==
This area was first named Dogwood Crossing by the explorer Ludwig Leichhardt. The town was later named Miles when the railway was being constructed in 1878, after William Miles who was a member of parliament and owned a property 'Dulacca' in the area. When more people settled in this area, in the early days there were a lot of dairy farms. The land is really not suitable for dairying, so in later years farmers have turned to growing wheat and there was also a lot of cotton grown.

In the early days Prickly Pear was a menace, it is believed it was brought to Australia as a pot plant. A lot of farmers walked off their land in the early 1890s until the moth was discovered to eradicate this pest.

== Historical village ==
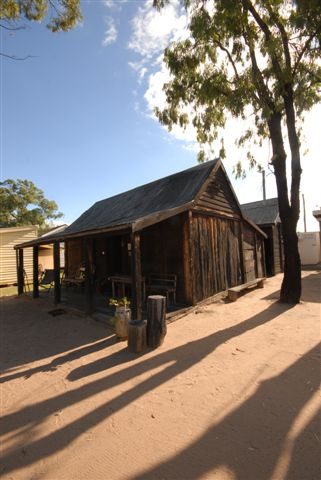
A slab hut in the Miles Historical Village

The historical village consists of 30 buildings, including the Artesian Basin Centre which houses information on Artesian Water, aboriginal history, and land care. The War Museum has displays from all World Wars. The Shell house has a comprehensive display of shells from all over the world. The Historical Village started in 1971 and has grown since then, with the Miles Historical Society attempting to add a new replica building every year, and expanding the museum's collection with memorabilia donated by families in the district.

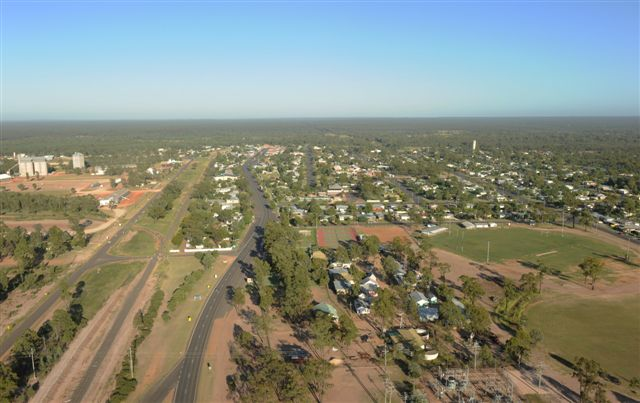
Aerial view of the Miles Historical Village

The village has an authentic 1900s era streetscape, featuring a bakery, post office, chemist, general store, Red Rose Cafe, and a branch of the Bank of New South Wales, all featuring real items from the time period. Also included are a church, school, butcher, and blacksmith. A typical slab hut from the early 1900s era is also displayed. The village also hosts the former Dalwogan railway station (part of the Wandoan Branch Railway), with the retired Queensland Government Railways C17 steam locomotive no. 944 on display outside.

== See also ==
- History of Queensland
- List of museums
