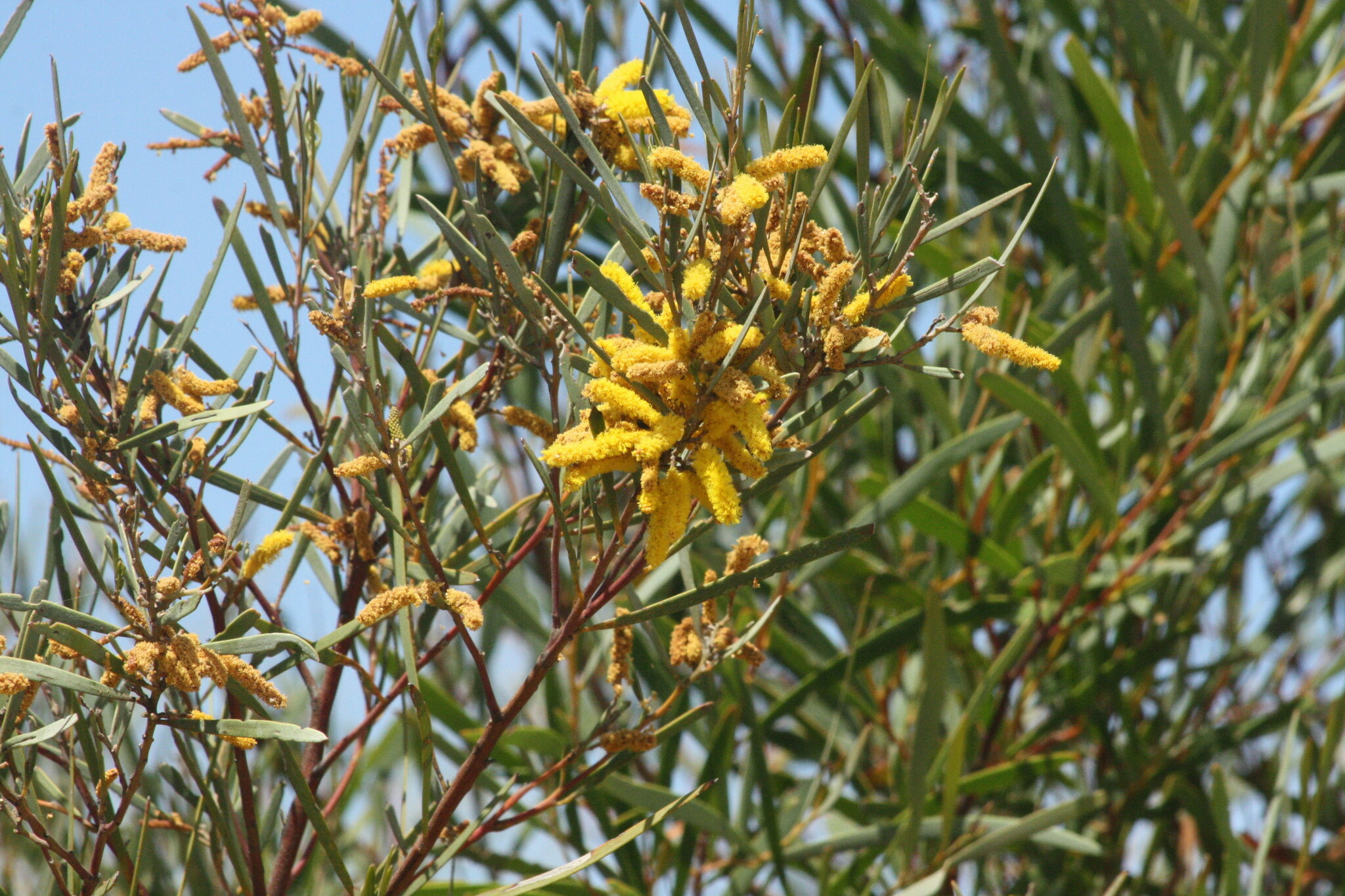
- Near Kowguran

Conservation status
- Least Concern (IUCN 3.1)

Scientific classification
- Kingdom: Plantae
- Clade: Embryophytes
- Clade: Tracheophytes
- Clade: Spermatophytes
- Clade: Angiosperms
- Clade: Eudicots
- Clade: Rosids
- Order: Fabales
- Family: Fabaceae
- Subfamily: Caesalpinioideae
- Clade: Mimosoid clade
- Genus: Acacia
- Species: A. aprepta

Binomial name
- Acacia aprepta Pedley
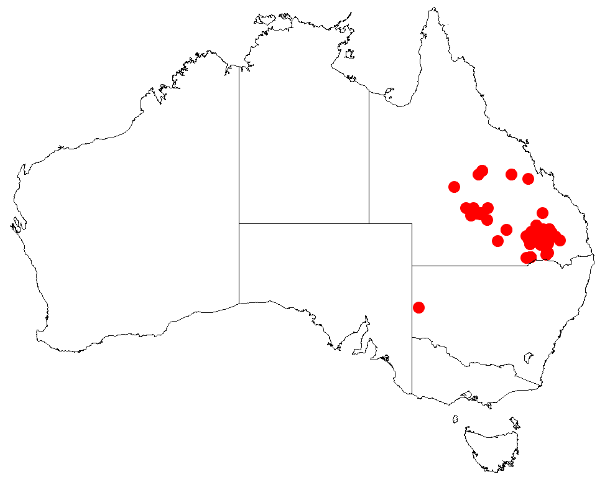
- Occurrence data from AVH

Synonyms
- Racosperma apreptum (Pedley) Pedley

= Acacia aprepta =

Species of legume

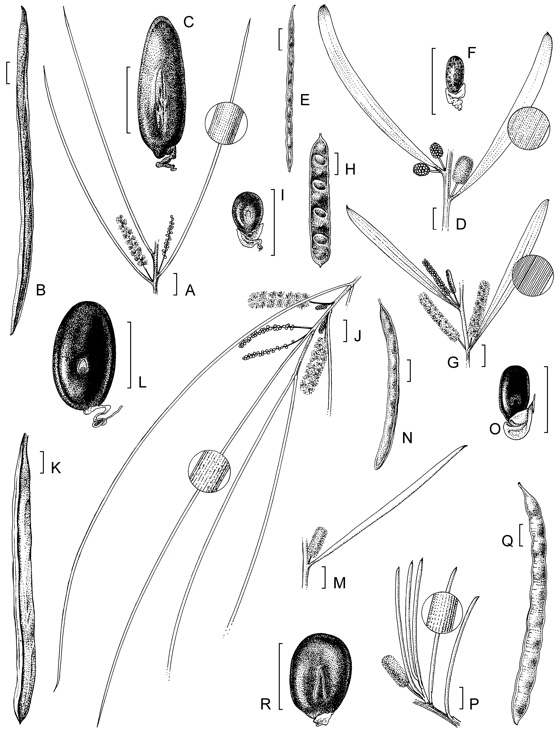
Diagram of Acacia aprepta

Acacia aprepta, commonly known as Miles mulga, is a species of flowering plant in the family Fabaceae and is endemic to south-eastern Queensland. It is a spreading tree with furrowed bark, linear flat or slightly curved phyllodes, up to 3 spikes of yellow flowers, and linear, papery pods up to about 60 mm (2.4 in) long.

== Description ==
Acacia aprepta is a spreading tree that typically grows to a height of up to 10 m (33 ft) and has dark, furrowed bark. Its phyllodes are linear, flat or slightly curved, 35–85 mm (1.4–3.3 in) long, 3–8 mm (0.12–0.31 in) wide, leathery and olive green. The flowers are borne in up to 3 spikes 6–35 mm (0.24–1.38 in) long in the axils of phyllodes and are yellow. Flowering mostly occurs from October to January, and the pods are light brown, papery, linear or very narrowly oblong and raised over the seeds, 25–60 mm (0.98–2.36 in) long and about 5–10 mm (0.20–0.39 in) wide. The seeds are dark brown, 2.3–3.5 mm (0.091–0.138 in) long.

== Taxonomy ==
Acacia aprepta was first formally described in 1974 by Leslie Pedley in Contributions from the Queensland Herbarium.

== Distribution and habitat ==
Miles mulga grows in thickets or dense populations in the western parts of the Darling Downs and around Maranoa, where it grows in shallow gravelly or loamy sandy soils often over sandstone.

== Conservation status ==
Acacia aprepta is listed as of "least concern" under the Queensland Government Nature Conservation Act 1992.

== See also ==
- List of Acacia species
