= Glenaubyn, Queensland =

Glenaubyn
- Suburb
- Interactive map of Glenaubyn
- Coordinates: 26.4875°S 149.9263°E
- Country: Australia
- State: Queensland
- LGA: Western Downs Region
- Location: 44.0 km (27.3 mi) NW of Miles; 133 km (83 mi) E of Roma; 171 km (106 mi) NW of Dalby; 381 km (237 mi) NW of Brisbane

Government
  - State electorate: Callide
  - Federal division: Maranoa

Area
  - Total: 244.6 km^{2} (94.4 sq mi)

Population
  - Total: 50 (2021 census)
  - Density: 0.204/km^{2} (0.53/sq mi)
- Time zone: UTC+10:00 (AEST)
- Postcode: 4424
Suburbs around Glenaubyn
Woleebee	Woleebee	Gurulmundi
Bogandilla	Glenaubyn	Kowguran
Drillham	Drillham	Dalwogon

Glenaubyn is a rural locality in the Western Downs Region, Queensland, Australia. In the 2021 census, Glenaubyn had a population of 50 people.

== History ==
Wallan Creek Upper Provisional School opened on 22 February 1915. On 1 June 1923, it became Glenaubyn State School. It closed on 14 March 1975. The school was on the north-east corner of the junction of Glenaubyn Road and Dunns Road (26.5052°S 149.9286°E).

== Demographics ==
In the 2016 census, Glenaubyn had a population of 48 people.

In the 2021 census, Glenaubyn had a population of 50 people.

== Education ==
There are no schools in Glenaubyn. The nearest government primary schools are Drillham State School in neighbouring Drillham to the south and Dulacca State School in Dulacca to the south-west. The nearest government secondary school is Miles State High School in Miles to the south-east.
