= Myall Park, Queensland =

Myall Park
- Suburb
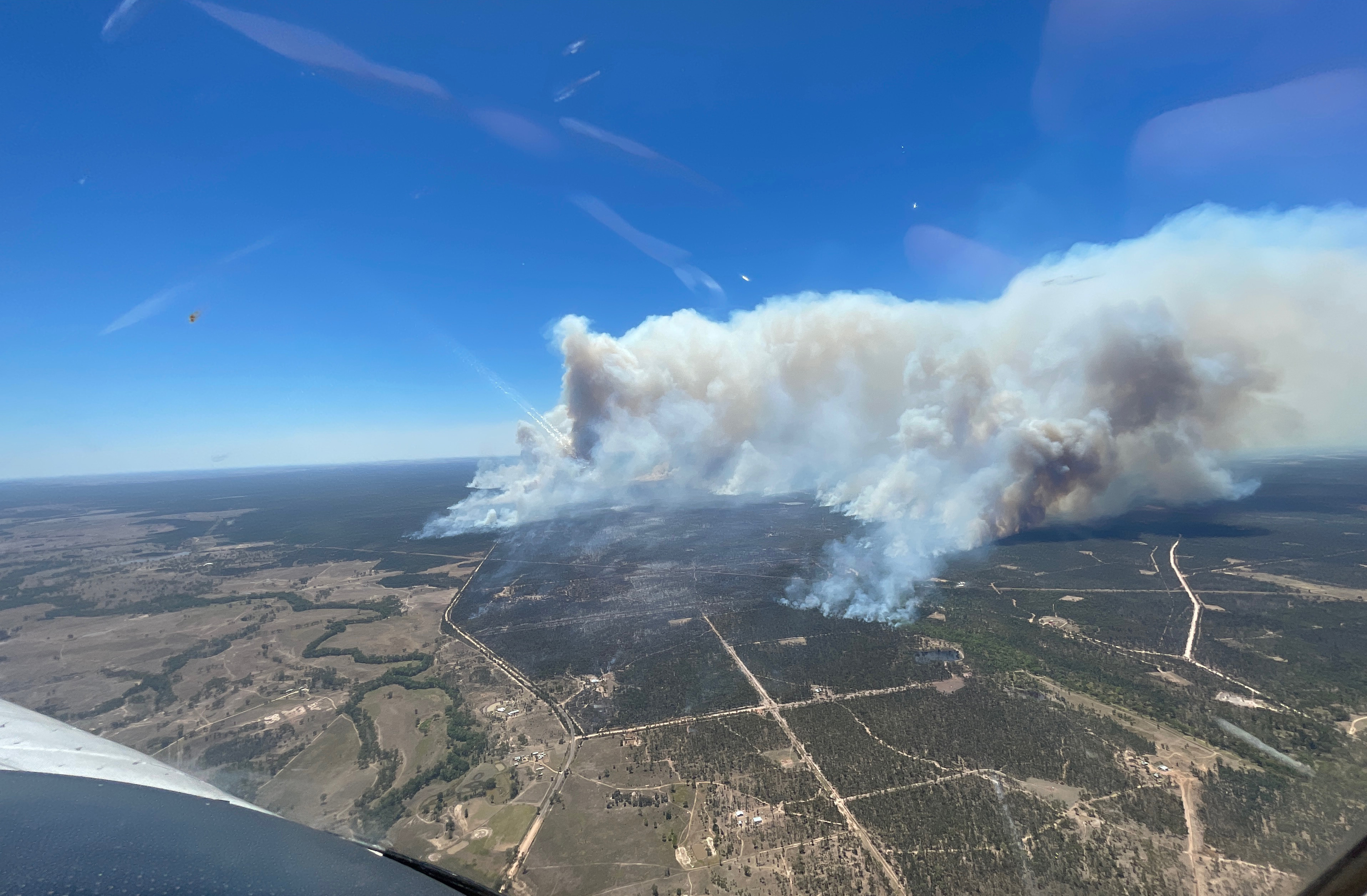
- Bushfires at Myall Park, 2023

- Interactive map of Myall Park
- Coordinates: 26.5797°S 150.1875°E
- Country: Australia
- State: Queensland
- LGA: Western Downs Region
- Location: 9.2 km (5.7 mi) N of Miles; 56.0 km (34.8 mi) WNW of Chinchilla; 136 km (85 mi) NW of Dalby; 219 km (136 mi) NW of Toowoomba; 348 km (216 mi) WNW of Brisbane

Government
  - State electorate: Callide
  - Federal division: Maranoa

Area
  - Total: 47.2 km^{2} (18.2 sq mi)

Population
  - Total: 17 (2021 census)
  - Density: 0.360/km^{2} (0.933/sq mi)
- Time zone: UTC+10:00 (AEST)
- Postcode: 4415
Suburbs around Myall Park
| Kowguran | Kowguran | Hookswood |
| Dalwogon | Myall Park | Hookswood |
| Miles | Miles | Miles |

Myall Park is a rural locality, north of Miles, in the Western Downs Region, Queensland, Australia. In the 2021 census, Myall Park had a population of 17 people.

== Geography ==
Dogwood Creek enters the locality from the east (Hookswood) and forms the south-eastern boundary of the locality before exiting to the south (Miles).

The Leichhardt Highway enters the locality from the west (Dalwogon), forms the north-western boundary of the locality, and then exits to the north-west (Kowguran).

The land use is predominantly grazing on native vegetation.

== History ==
Myall Park State School opened in 1922. It closed circa 1942. The school was on the western side of Myall Park Road (formerly Miles Retreat Road, 26.58067°S 150.18059°E).

Between January and March 2023, a number of bushfires burnt thousands of hectares of land, impacting the communities of Tara, Fairyland, Myall Park, and Montrose.

== Demographics ==
In the 2016 census, Myall Park had a population of 21 people.

In the 2021 census, Myall Park had a population of 17 people.

== Education ==
There are no schools in Myall Park. The nearest government primary and secondary schools are Miles State School and Miles State High School, both in neighbouring Miles to the south.
