= Hookswood, Queensland =

Hookswood
- Suburb
- Interactive map of Hookswood
- Coordinates: 26.5302°S 150.3311°E
- Country: Australia
- State: Queensland
- LGA: Western Downs Region
- Location: 18.0 km (11.2 mi) NNE of Miles; 43.5 km (27.0 mi) WNW of Chinchilla; 124 km (77 mi) NW of Dalby; 206 km (128 mi) NW of Toowoomba; 334 km (208 mi) NWW of Brisbane

Government
  - State electorate: Callide
  - Federal division: Maranoa

Area
  - Total: 416.9 km^{2} (161.0 sq mi)

Population
  - Total: 58 (2021 census)
  - Density: 0.1391/km^{2} (0.3603/sq mi)
- Time zone: UTC+10:00 (AEST)
- Postcode: 4415
Suburbs around Hookswood
Gurulmundi	Pelham	Barakula
Kowguran	Hookswood	Blackswamp
Myall Park; Miles	Columboola	Cameby

Hookswood is a rural locality in the Western Downs Region, Queensland, Australia. In the 2021 census, Hookswood had a population of 58 people.

== Geography ==
Hookswood is immediately north-east of Miles.

The Warrego Highway passes to the south of the locality, and the Leichhardt Highway to the west of the locality; there are no major roads within the locality.

The north of the locality is within the Barakula State Forest. The land use in the rest of the locality is grazing on native vegetation.

== History ==
The locality takes its name from an early-1850s pastoral run on Dogwood Creek operated by John Ferrettin (together with the Dogwood run to the immediate south). In 1852, C.J. McKenzie took over both runs.

Hookswood State School opened in 1914 and due to low student numbers closed in 1922 . The school reopened in 1923 but closed again. It reopened in 1925 and closed again in 1926. The school was on Hookswood Pelham Road (26.53817°S 150.25779°E).

== Demographics ==
In the 2016 census, Hookswood had a population of 56 people.

In the 2021 census, Hookswood had a population of 58 people.

== Education ==
There are no schools in Hookswood. The nearest government primary schools are Miles State School in neighbouring Miles to the south-west and Chinchilla State School in Chinchilla to the south-east. The nearest government secondary schools are Miles State High School in Miles and Chinchilla State High School in Chinchilla.
