= Kowguran, Queensland =

Kowguran
- Suburb
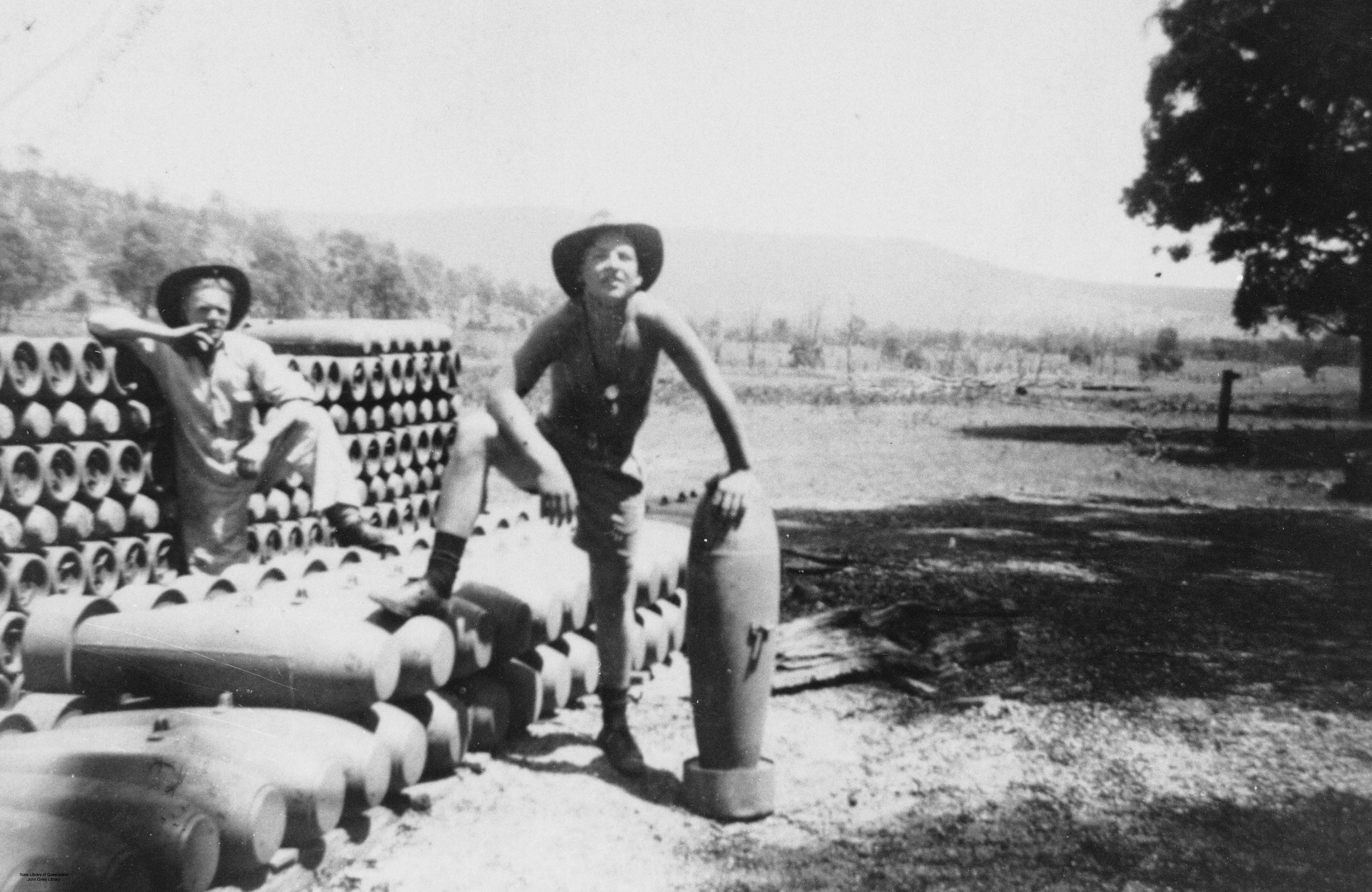
- Two Air Force workers stacking explosives during World War II

- Interactive map of Kowguran
- Coordinates: 26.5069°S 150.1225°E
- Country: Australia
- State: Queensland
- LGA: Western Downs Region
- Location: 23.5 km (14.6 mi) NNW of Miles; 150 km (93 mi) NW of Dalby; 233 km (145 mi) NW of Dalby; 361 km (224 mi) NW of Brisbane

Government
  - State electorate: Callide
  - Federal division: Maranoa

Area
  - Total: 172.5 km^{2} (66.6 sq mi)

Population
  - Total: 62 (2021 census)
  - Density: 0.3594/km^{2} (0.931/sq mi)
- Time zone: UTC+10:00 (AEST)
- Postcode: 4415
Suburbs around Kowguran
Glenaubyn	Gurulmundi	Hookswood
Glenaubyn	Kowguran	Hookswood
Glenaubyn	Dalwogon	Myall Park

Kowguran is a rural locality in the Western Downs Region, Queensland, Australia. In the 2021 census, Kowguran had a population of 62 people.

== History ==
The RAAF Area Explosives Reserve, Kowguran was established in 1942 to store explosives in a number of concrete bunkers. It was operated by 3 Central Reserve (RAAF). It was decommissioned in 1956.

== Demographics ==
In the 2016 census, Kowguran had a population of 41 people.

In the 2021 census, Kowguran had a population of 62 people.

== Education ==
There are no schools in Kowguran. The nearest government primary schools are Miles State School in Miles to the south, Drillham State School in Drillham to the south-west, and Guluguba State School in Guluguba to the north. The nearest government secondary school is Miles State High School, also in Miles.
