= Liberty Hall, Ipswich =

Liberty Hall
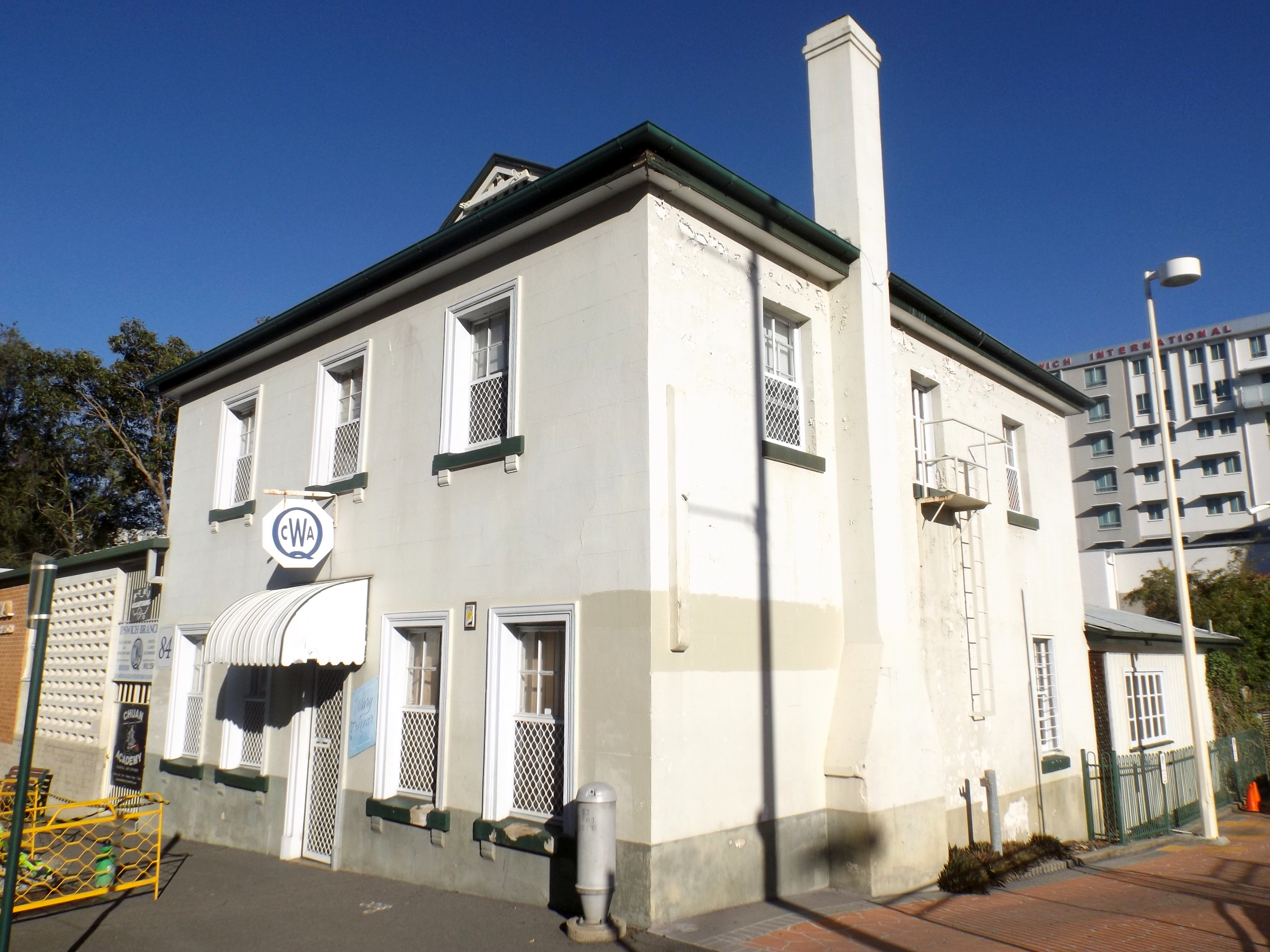
- Building 2016

- Location within Queensland Location within Australia
- 27.6154°S 152.7592°E
- Location: 84 Limestone Street, Ipswich, City of Ipswich, Queensland, Australia

History
- Design period: 1840s–1860s (mid-19th century)
- Built: c. 1857

Queensland Heritage Register
- Official name: Liberty Hall – Mary Tregear Hostel, Current name – Mary Tregear Hostel, Liberty Hall
- Type: state heritage (built)
- Designated: 21 October 1992
- Reference no.: 600583
- Significant period: 1850s (fabric); 1850s–1880s (historical); 1942– (social)
- Significant components: cellar, residential accommodation – main house, kitchen/kitchen house

Liberty Hall is a heritage-listed detached house at 84 Limestone Street, Ipswich, City of Ipswich, Queensland, Australia. It was built c. 1857. It is also known as Mary Tregear Hostel. It was added to the Queensland Heritage Register on 21 October 1992.

== History ==
Liberty Hall is a two-storey rendered brick house with a cellar, built between 1857 and 1860 for Chief Constable Edward Quinn. The property was sold to James Sloane in 1877, then passed to his widow in 1887.

The house then appears to have been rented by blacksmith Hugh Campbell. Hugh's father, Donald Campbell, had been the first free settler in Ipswich after George Thorn (senior), arriving with his family in 1842 and carrying on his trade as a blacksmith. The firm reputedly shod the horses for Ludwig Leichhardt when he passed through Ipswich on an exploring expedition.

Hugh Campbell also worked as a blacksmith and took over the business after his father died in 1857. The family home and business was at that time on the corner of East and Limestone streets, Ipswich. When the Ipswich & West Moreton Building Society building was built on the site in 1887, the Campbells re-established further up Limestone street. Hugh Campbell was well known in the Ipswich community, acting as Clerk of the Course on every raceday. It has been said that the building was called Liberty Hall because of his generous hospitality, but this may have been a local saying rather than a formal name, as the term was in general use at that time.

The house was bought by Hugh's three sons under nomination of trustees in 1910. The smithy closed down in 1916 and Hugh died in 1917 but the house remained in the family until 1942. The Queensland Country Women's Association bought the property in 1942. The house was used as a girls' hostel and a fibro-and-timber army building was moved to the site as a meeting hall. They named the property the Mary Tregear Hostel after the first president of the Ipswich branch of the Country Women's Association.

In 1964, the land was subdivided and a coal research laboratory was built on portion of it. The army hut was replaced by a brick hall on the eastern side of the block, and a rear kitchen wing was built, its materials and construction suggesting a date c. 1960.

== Description ==
Liberty Hall is a two-storey brick house with a half-gabled corrugated galvanised iron roof and basement cellar. It is constructed with the front wall against the road alignment. At the rear is an attached single-storey timber frame kitchen wing with a floor level approximately 300 millimetres (12 in) below the floor level of the original front wing. The site has been further developed with a flat-roofed brick and blockwork meeting hall which runs the full length of the eastern alignment.

The original two-storeyed wing has a painted ruled render exterior finish, with solid rendered architraves around the windows. The front elevation is of symmetrical design with a central front doorway flanked with two pairs of colonial sash windows. The upper level has three colonial sash windows. The original ground floor contains a central hallway leading to a small timber staircase and four rooms, one of which has a fireplace with simple painted cedar surround. Ground floor walls are generally of painted plaster, the joinery is of very simple design such as square section balusters under the cedar handrail to the stair. Ceilings are of fibro with timber cornice and doors are of the four-panel type.

The original wing's upper floor has a narrow transverse hallway entered from the stairway top landing. This level has five small bedrooms and a toilet. All of the upper level partition walls are of 300-millimetre (12 in) wide vertical beaded tongue-and-groove timber boards, single-lined, and all doors are of the simple ledged type, sheeted with vertical tongue and groove. Ceilings of the upper level are of tongue and groove.

A basement cellar extends underneath the whole of the ground floor of the original wing up to the retaining wall against the footpath. The rear kitchen wing supported on concrete stumps contains a kitchen, store-room, dining room, two bathrooms and a toilet. External walls are of asbestos cement "shadowline" sheeting and casement windows. Rear stairs give access internally to a lower level enclosed landing.

== Heritage listing ==
Liberty Hall was listed on the Queensland Heritage Register on 21 October 1992 having satisfied the following criteria.

The place is important in demonstrating the evolution or pattern of Queensland's history.

The place demonstrates rare, uncommon or endangered aspects of Queensland's cultural heritage.

Built between 1857 and 1860, Mary Tregear Hostel is one of the oldest buildings in Ipswich and is a rare example of a simple town dwelling in colonial Georgian style.

The place is important because of its aesthetic significance.

Although its roofline has been altered, it retains much of its original symmetrical form and is valued by the community for its aesthetic contribution to the streetscape of central Ipswich.

The place has a special association with the life or work of a particular person, group or organisation of importance in Queensland's history.

It is closely associated with the work of the QCWA and in particular, its role in providing supervised accommodation for country girls working in the city. It is closely associated with the Campbell family, the first free settlers to arrive in Ipswich after 1842, and with an early senior police official Edward Quinn.
