= Dalwogon, Queensland =

Dalwogon
- Suburb
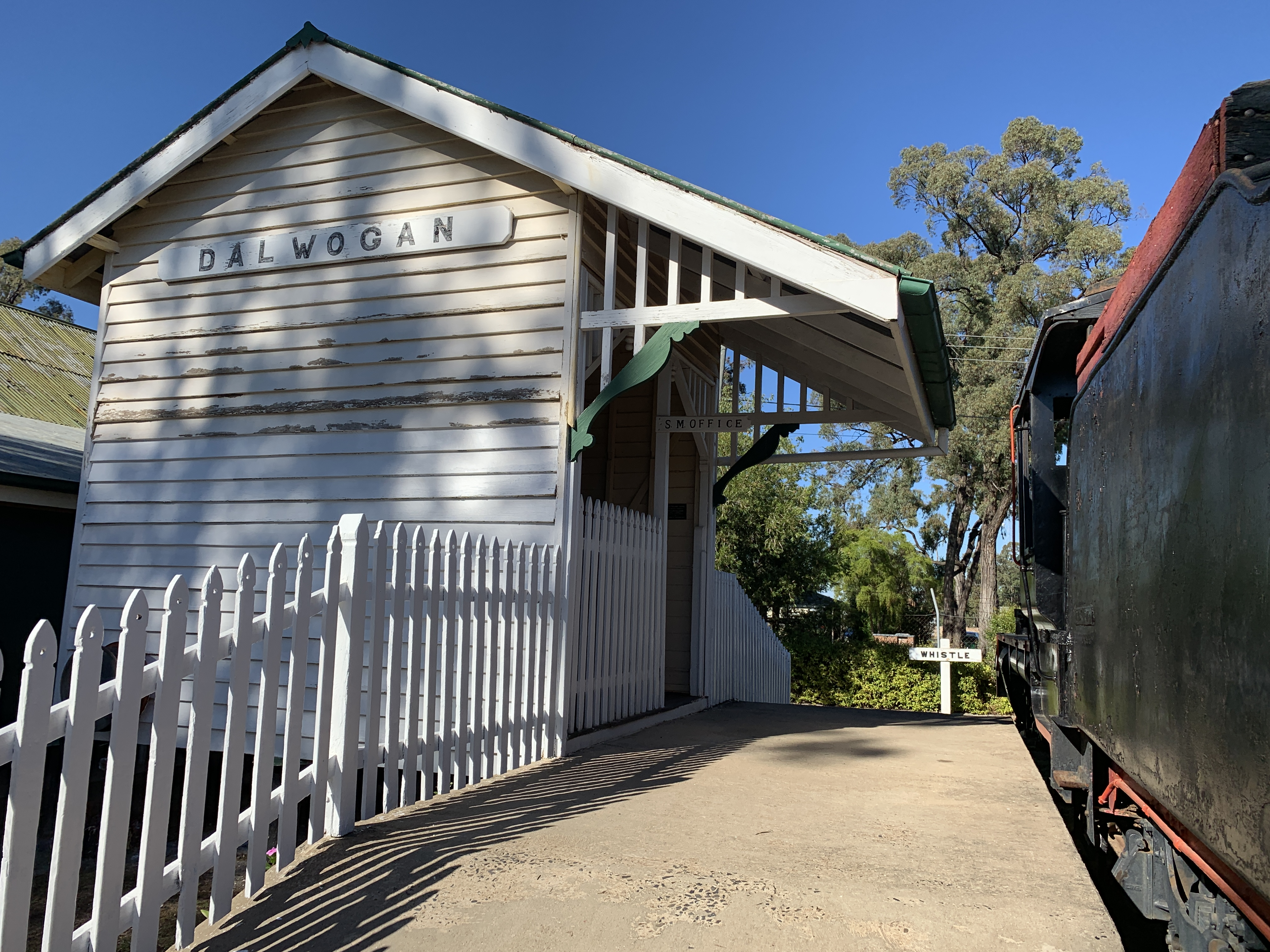
- Dalwogan railway station with C17 class locomotive, relocated to Miles Historical Village, 2019

- Interactive map of Dalwogon
- Coordinates: 26.5747°S 150.0905°E
- Country: Australia
- State: Queensland
- LGA: Western Downs Region
- Location: 13.7 km (8.5 mi) NNW of Miles; 140 km (87 mi) NW of Dalby; 223 km (139 mi) NW of Toowoomba; 351 km (218 mi) WNW of Brisbane

Government
  - State electorate: Callide
  - Federal division: Maranoa

Area
  - Total: 158.7 km^{2} (61.3 sq mi)

Population
  - Total: 53 (2021 census)
  - Density: 0.334/km^{2} (0.865/sq mi)
- Time zone: UTC+10:00 (AEST)
- Postcode: 4415
Suburbs around Dalwogon
Glenaubyn	Kowguran	Kowguran
Glenaubyn	Dalwogon	Myall Park
Drillham	Miles	Miles

Dalwogon (sometimes written as Dalwogan) is a rural locality in the Western Downs Region, Queensland, Australia. In the 2021 census, Dalwogon had a population of 53 people.

== Geography ==
The locality is roughly bounded to the north and east by Nine Mile Creek.

The Leichhardt Highway passes through the locality from south-east (Miles) to the north-east (Kowguran).

The land use is predominantly grazing on native vegetation with small amounts of crops.

== History ==
The name Dalwogon/Dalwogan is an Aboriginal word meaning turtle.

The Dalwogan railway station on the Wandoan railway line was at 26.5756°S 150.1506°E. The line and the station are now both closed. (The spelling of the names of the locality and the railway station slightly differ.) The railway station building was subsequently relocated to the Miles Historical Museum.

In November 1917, the Queensland Government offered perpetual leases for town allotments in the Town of Dalwogon.

== Demographics ==
In the 2016 census, Dalwogon had a population of 31 people.

In the 2021 census, Dalwogon had a population of 53 people.

== Education ==
There are no schools in Dalwogon. The nearest government primary schools are Drillham State School in neighbouring Drillham to the south-west and Miles State School in neighbouring Miles to the south-east. The nearest government secondary school is Miles State High School in Miles.
