= Drillham, Queensland =

Drillham
- Town
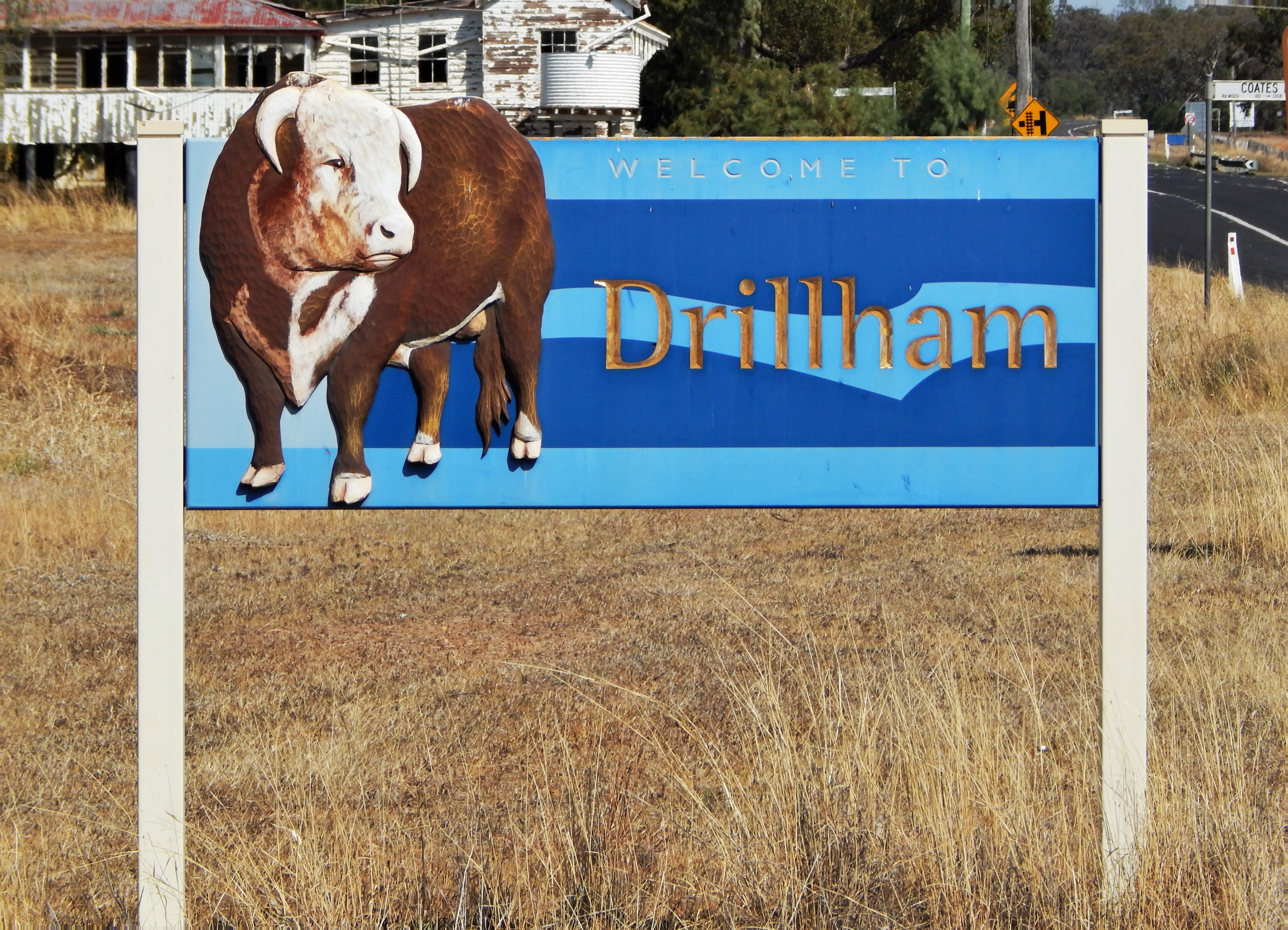
- Welcome to Drillham sign, 2019

- Interactive map of Drillham
- Coordinates: 26.6411°S 149.9833°E
- Country: Australia
- State: Queensland
- LGA: Western Downs Region
- Location: 20.7 km (12.9 mi) W of Miles; 121 km (75 mi) E of Roma; 149 km (93 mi) NW of Dalby; 230 km (140 mi) NW of Toowoomba; 358 km (222 mi) NW of Brisbane

Government
  - State electorate: Callide
  - Federal division: Maranoa

Area
  - Total: 360.0 km^{2} (139.0 sq mi)

Population
  - Total: 113 (2021 census)
  - Density: 0.3139/km^{2} (0.813/sq mi)
- Time zone: UTC+10:00 (AEST)
- Postcode: 4424
Localities around Drillham
Bogandilla	Glenaubyn	Dalwogon
Dulacca	Drillham	Miles
Dulacca	Drillham South	Drillham South

Drillham is a rural town and locality in the Western Downs Region, Queensland, Australia. In the 2021 census, the locality of Drillham had a population of 113 people.

== Geography ==
The town is on the Darling Downs and on the Warrego Highway, 358 kilometres (222 mi) north west of the state capital, Brisbane.

The Western railway line enters the locality from the east (Miles) and exits to the west (Dulacca) with the locality having a number of railway stations (from west to east):

- Palardo railway station, now abandoned (26.6447°S 149.8241°E)
- Waituna railway station, now abandoned (26.6435°S 149.8541°E)
- Ulimaroa cattle siding (26.6376°S 149.9074°E)
- Ulimaroa railway station (26.6381°S 149.9153°E)
- Drillham railway station, serving the town (26.6418°S 149.9820°E)

== History ==
Settlement in Drillham commenced with three pastoral stations: Dulacca, Binbian and Wallan Creek.

The town was established in 1878 to service the railway and was home to a camp for workers building the bridge over nearby Drillham Creek. Drillham Post Office opened by June 1910 (a receiving office had been open from 1895). The town and the creek were originally known as 'Delerium' due to the typhoid fever that struck this camp.

Drillham Provisional School opened on 28 Aug 1899, becoming Drillham State School on 1 January 1909.

=== 1893 Drillham Creek tragedy ===
Four children from the same family died on 15 January 1893 when they were all accidentally drowned in Drillham Creek. Matilda Roehrig (aged 14), Isabella Roehrig (aged 12), Charles Roehrig (aged 11) and Jane Roehrig (aged 8) were the children of railway lengthsman Charles Roehrig and his wife Matilda. The news of the children's deaths was widely reported in newspapers around Australia. The site where the children's bodies were buried is located alongside the creek beside the Warrego Highway and is marked with a small monument with a commemorative plaque which was unveiled by the Miles and District Historical Society on 23 July 1966.

== Demographics ==
In the 2011 census, the locality of Drillham and the surrounding area had a population of 217 people.

In the 2016 census, the locality of Drillham had a population of 126 people.

In the 2021 census, the locality of Drillham had a population of 113 people.

== Economy ==
Drillham is a centre for the production of livestock and grains.

== Education ==
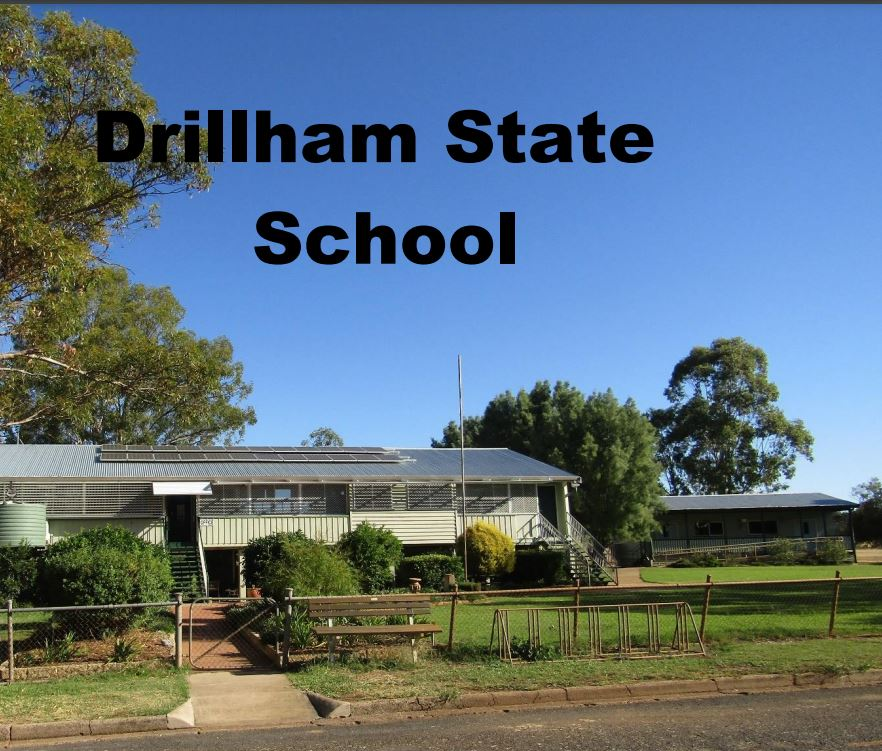

Drillham State School is a government primary (Prep-6) school for boys and girls at 13 Jardine Street (26.6443°S 149.9815°E). In 2016, the school had an enrolment of 29 students with 3 teachers (2 equivalent full-time) and 4 non-teaching staff (2 equivalent full-time). In 2018, the school had an enrolment of 33 students with 4 teachers (3 full-time equivalent) and 5 non-teaching staff (3 full-time equivalent).

There are no secondary schools in Drillham. The nearest government secondary school is Miles State High School in neighbouring Miles to the east.
