= Western Downs Region =

Coordinates: 27°11′3″S 151°15′52″E

- Local government area
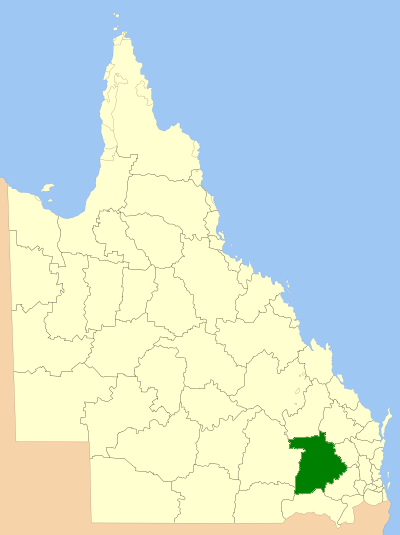
- Location within Queensland

- Interactive map of Western Downs Region
- Country: Australia
- State: Queensland
- Established: 2008
- Council seat: Dalby

Government
  - Mayor: Cr Andrew Smith
  - State electorates: Warrego; Callide
  - Federal division: Maranoa

Area
  - Total: 37,937 km^{2} (14,648 sq mi)

Population
  - Total: 33,843 (2021 census)
  - Density: 0.892084/km^{2} (2.31049/sq mi)
- Website: Western Downs Region
LGAs around Western Downs Region
Central Highlands	Banana	South and North Burnett
Maranoa	Western Downs Region	Toowoomba
Balonne	Goondiwindi	Toowoomba

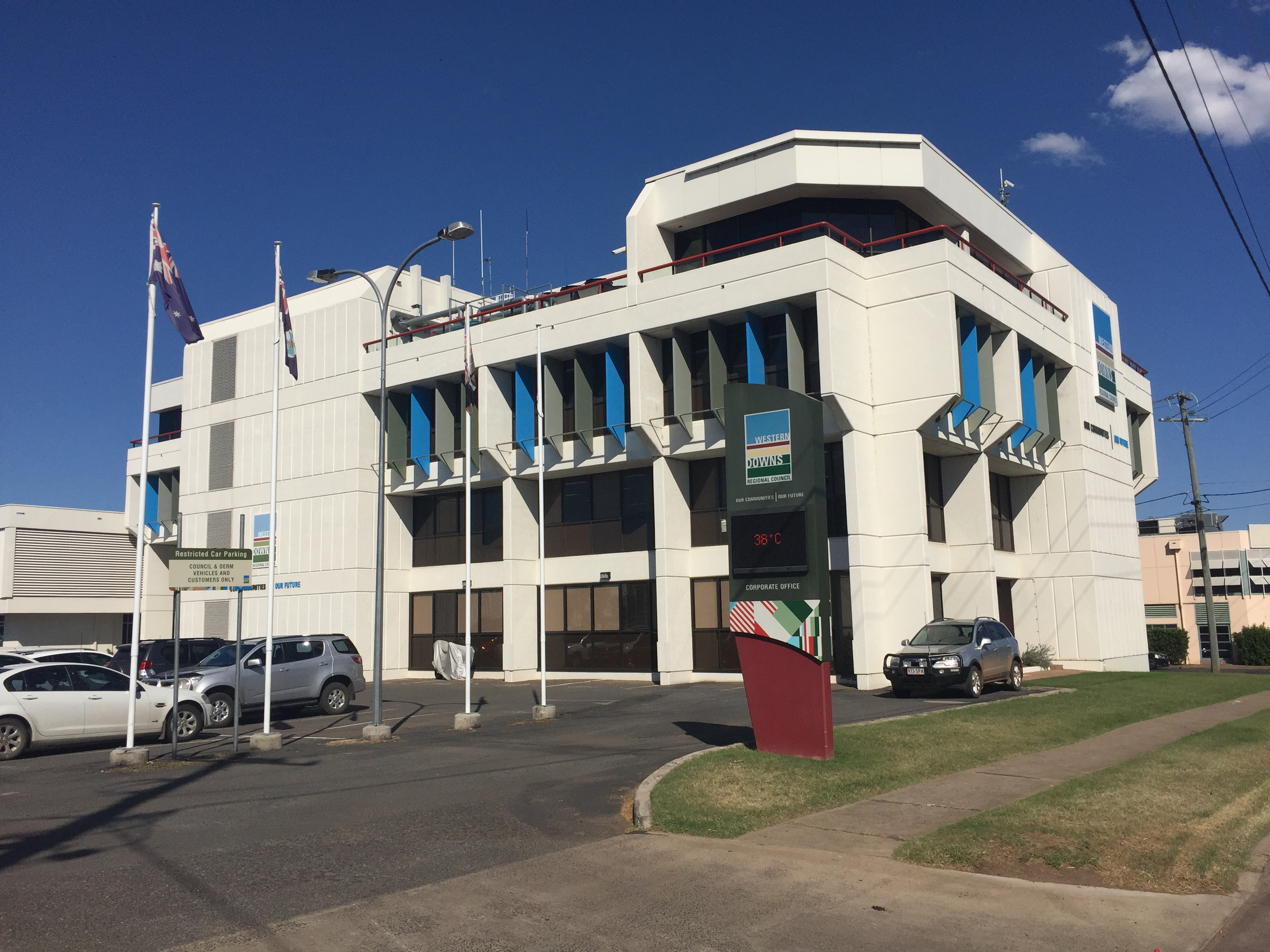
The current corporate office for the Western Downs Regional Council

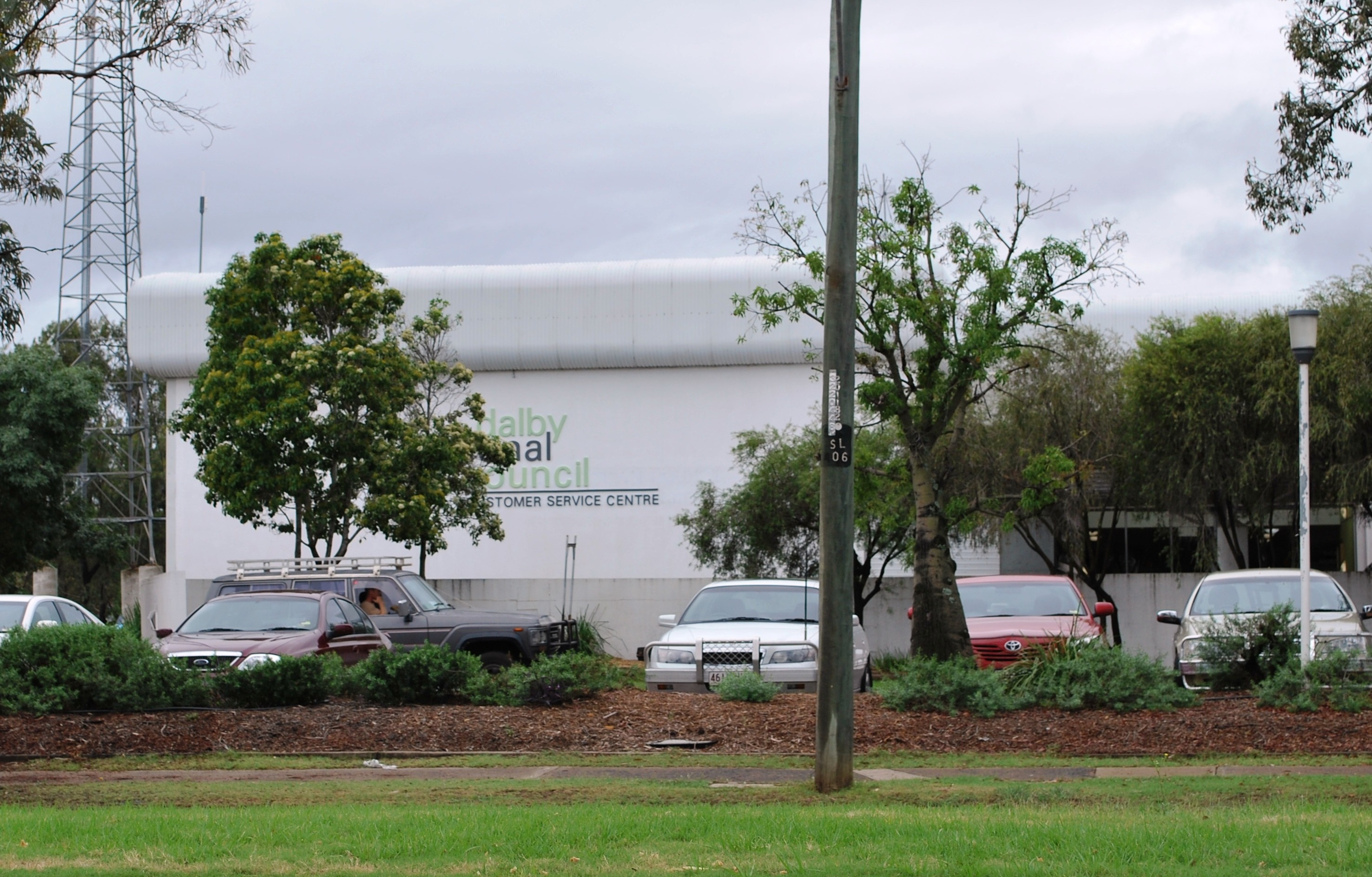
The former Dalby Regional Council offices. Now the location of the Town Library and the Dalby Civic Theatre

Western Downs Region is a local government area in Queensland, Australia. The Western Downs Regional Council manages an area of 37,937 square kilometres (14,648 sq mi), which is slightly smaller than Switzerland, although with a population of 34,467 in June 2018, it is over 228 times less densely populated.

The area is home to prime farming land and thus agriculture is a major industry in the area. Dalby, the biggest town in the region is home to the second largest cattle saleyards in Australia. The Dalby Saleyards process over 200,000 cattle annually in its facility which is comparable to Rockhampton and Casino.

The Western Downs Regional Council's Corporate Office is situated at 30 Marble Street, Dalby.

In the 2021 census, the Western Downs Region had a population of 33,843 people.

== History ==
Baranggum (also known as Barrunggam, Barunggam Parrungoom, Murrumgama) is an Australian Aboriginal language spoken by the Baranggum people. The Baranggum language region includes the landscape within the local government boundaries of the Western Downs Regional Council, particularly Dalby, Tara, Jandowae and west towards Chinchilla.

Western Downs Region was created in March 2008 as a result of the report of the Local Government Reform Commission released in July 2007.

Prior to the 2008 amalgamation, the new Region, located in the Darling Downs region, consisted the entire area of five previous local government areas:

- the Town of Dalby;
- the Shire of Chinchilla;
- the Shire of Murilla;
- the Shire of Tara;
- the Shire of Wambo;
- and Division 2 of the Shire of Taroom.

The report recommended that the new local government area should not be divided into wards and elect ten councillors and a mayor. The report estimated that the resident population in 2006 was 30,018 and the operating budget was A$74 million.

Originally called Dalby Region, a name change to Western Downs was approved in August 2009. The name change was greeted positively by residents as they felt the name was more inclusive and a better representation of the area. The name "Western Downs" stems from the phrase Darling Downs, and as the name suggests; the area to the west of the downs.

== Towns and localities ==
The Western Downs Region includes the following settlements:

Dalby area:

- Dalby (town)

Chinchilla area:

- Baking Board
- Boonarga
- Brigalow (town)
- Burncluith
- Canaga
- Chances Plain
- Chinchilla (town)
- Crossroads
- Goombi
- Hopeland
- Kogan (town)
- Pelican
- Rywung
- Wychie

Murilla area:

- Columboola
- Condamine (town)
- Dalwogon
- Drillham (town)
- Dulacca (town)
- Gurulmundi
- Kowguran
- Miles (town)
- Barramornie
- Bogandilla
- Drillham South
- Glenaubyn
- Hookswood
- Moraby
- Myall Park
- Nangram
- Pine Hills
- Sunnyside
- Yulabilla

Tara area:

- Flinton
- Glenmorgan (town)
- Goranba
- Hannaford
- Inglestone
- Meandarra
- Moonie (town)
- Tara (town)
- The Gums (town)
- Weranga
- Westmar

Wambo area:

- Bell (town)
- Burra Burri
- Cooranga
- Ducklo
- Irvingdale
- Jandowae (town)
- Jimbour (town)
- Jimbour East
- Jimbour West
- Kaimkillenbun (town)
- Kumbarilla
- Macalister
- Mowbullan
- Nandi
- Pirrinuan
- Roche Creek
- St Ruth
- Tuckerang
- Warra (town)

South Taroom area:

- Eurombah^{1}
- Grosmont
- Guluguba
- Wandoan (town)

^{1} – shared with the Shire of Banana

== Libraries ==
The Western Downs Regional Council operates public libraries at Bell, Chinchilla, Dalby, Jandowae, Meandarra, Miles, Moonie, Tara, and Wandoan.

== Demographics ==
In the 2011 census (the first for the new region), the Western Downs Region had a population of 31,590 people, including the following sub-populations:

Town	Population	Location
Bell	544	39 km NE of Dalby
Brigalow	404	62 km NW of Dalby, 20 km SE of Chinchilla
Chinchilla	5,487	82 km NW of Dalby
Condamine	426	125 km W of Dalby, 59 km SW of Chinchilla
Dalby	12,299	210 km WNW of Brisbane
Drillham	217	148 WNW of Dalby, 66 km W of Chinchilla
Dulacca	249	170 km WNW of Dalby, 89 km W of Chinchilla
Glenmorgan	385	173 km W of Dalby, 138 km SW of Chinchilla
Jandowae	1,246	49 km NNW of Dalby, 56 km E of Chinchilla
Jimbour	185	26 km N of Dalby, 73 km ESE of Chinchilla
Kaimkillenbun	566	24 km NE of Dalby
Kogan	355	53 km WNW of Dalby, 46 km SE of Chinchilla
Miles	1854	127 km WNW of Dalby, 46 km W of Chinchilla
Moonie	253	114 km SW of Dalby, 144 km S of Chinchilla
Tara	2,211	89 km W of Dalby, 70 km S of Chinchilla
The Gums	170	117 km WSW of Dalby, 96 km SSW of Chinchilla
Wandoan	665	196 km NW of Dalby, 115 km NW of Chinchilla
Warra	318	46 km NW of Dalby, 36 km SE of Chinchilla

^{*} – shared with the Shire of Banana

In the 2016 census, the Western Downs Region had a population of 33,444 people.

In the 2021 census, the Western Downs Region had a population of 33,843 people.

== Mayors and councillors ==
=== Mayors ===
- 2008–2016: Ray Brown*
- 2016–2024: Paul McVeigh
- 2024 - present: Andrew Smith

=== Councillors ===
==== 2024 ====
The councillors elected in 2024 were:

- Kylie Bourne- Deputy Mayor (2020–present)
- Peter Saxelby (2016–present)
- Kaye Maguire (2016–present)
- Megan James (2020 - present)
- George Moore (2020 - present)
- Greg Olm (2024–present)
- Sophie Bougoure (2024–present)
- Sam Condon (2024 - present)

*was representative of a region pre-amalgamation
