= Miles, Queensland =

Miles
- Town
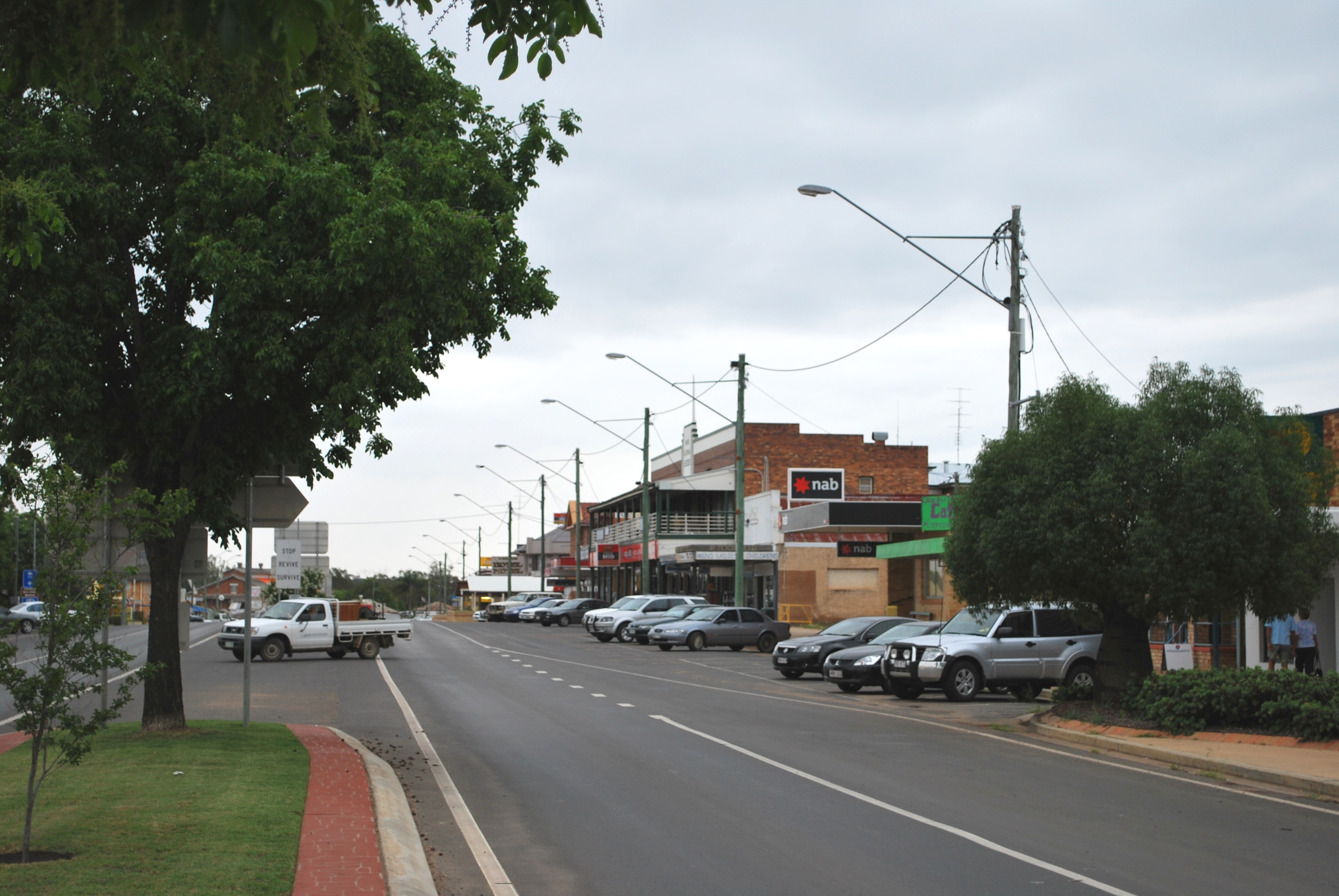
- The main street of Miles (looking towards Roma and Charleville)

- Interactive map of Miles
- Coordinates: 26.6572°S 150.1897°E
- Country: Australia
- State: Queensland
- LGA: Western Downs Region
- Location: 406 km (252 mi) E of Charleville; 141 km (88 mi) E of Roma; 127 km (79 mi) NW of Dalby; 210 km (130 mi) NW of Toowoomba; 337 km (209 mi) WNW of Brisbane
- Established: 1878

Government
  - State electorates: Callide; Warrego
  - Federal division: Maranoa

Area
  - Total: 437.8 km^{2} (169.0 sq mi)
- Elevation: 302 m (991 ft)

Population
  - Total: 1,874 (2021 census)
  - Density: 4.2805/km^{2} (11.086/sq mi)
- Time zone: UTC+10:00 (AEST)
- Postcode: 4415
- Mean max temp: 27.1 °C (80.8 °F)
- Mean min temp: 12.2 °C (54.0 °F)
- Annual rainfall: 650.6 mm (25.61 in)
Localities around Miles
Dalwogon	Myall Park	Hookswood
Drillham	Miles	Columboola
Drillham South	Condamine	Nangram

Miles is a rural town and locality in the Western Downs Region, Queensland, Australia. In the 2021 census, the locality of Miles had a population of 1,874 people.

== Geography ==
The town is on the Warrego Highway, 340 kilometres (210 mi) west of Brisbane, the state capital, 211 kilometres (131 miles) west of Toowoomba, 127 kilometres (79 miles) west of Dalby and 48 kilometres (30 miles) west of Chinchilla. It is situated 141 kilometres (88 mi) east of Roma, 221 kilometres (137 miles) east of Mitchell, 306 kilometres (190 miles) east of Morven and 406 kilometres (252 mi) east of Charleville.

== History ==
Formerly known as Dogwood Crossing, the town is situated on Dogwood Creek, named by German explorer Ludwig Leichhardt in 1844. The town was renamed Miles in honour of the Queensland Colonial Secretary, William Miles. Miles Post Office opened on 3 January 1878.

Miles Provisional School opened on 31 May 1880, becoming Miles State School on 18 January 1886.

Condamine Road Provisional School opened on 30 July 1908, becoming Condamine Road State School circa 1910. It closed on 13 October 1925. It was on a 5-acre (2.0 ha) site on the western side of the Leichhardt Highway (approx 26.7965°S 150.1599°E). In 1928, the school building was relocated to the Dogwood State School.

Holy Cross School opened in 1926. It closed on 15 December 1989.

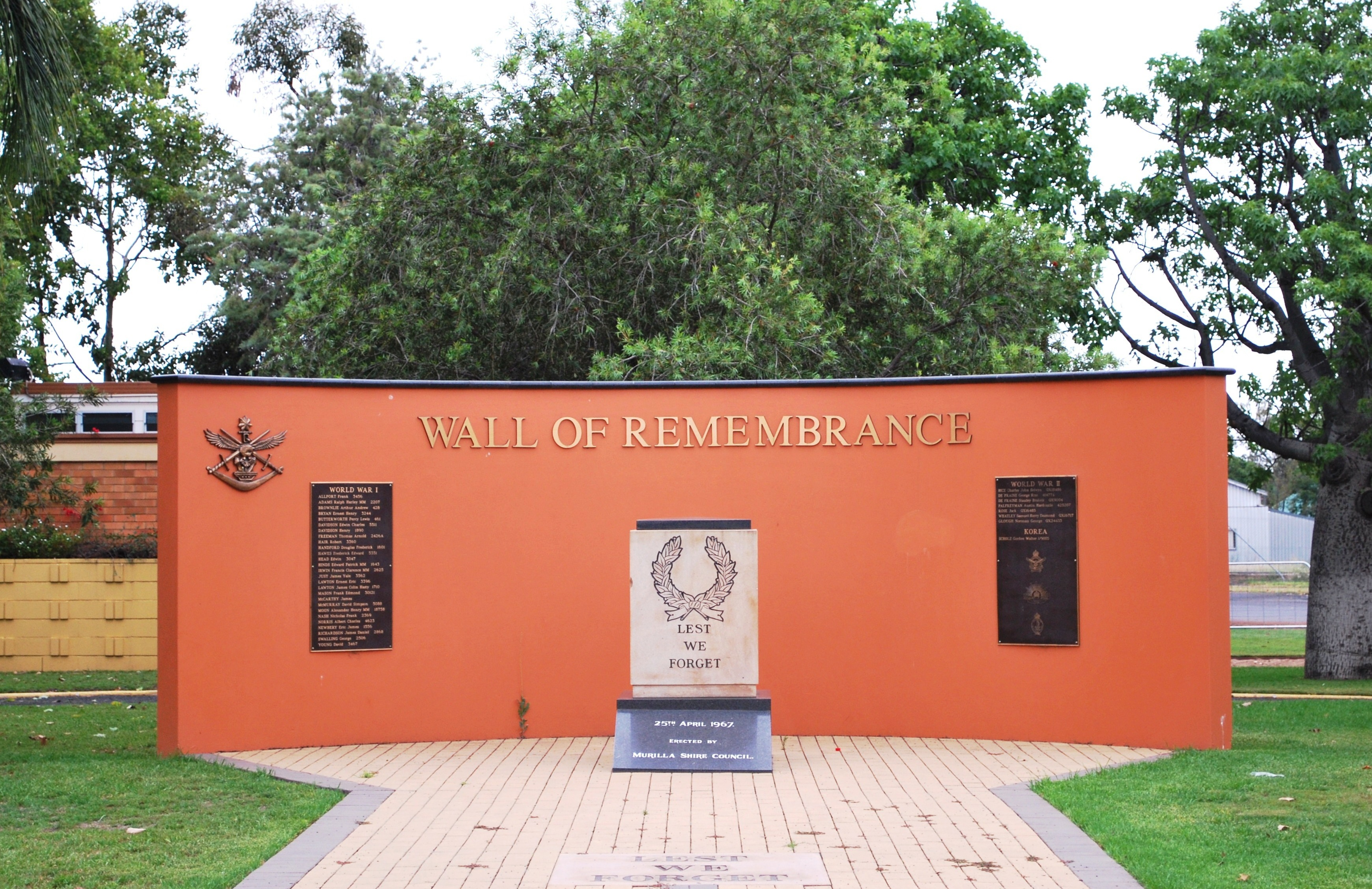
Miles War Memorial and Wall of Remembrance, 2008

The Miles War Memorial and Wall of Remembrance was erected by the former Murilla Shire Council and dedicated on 25 April 1967.

Miles State High School opened on 30 January 1979.

Miles Library facility opened in 2002. It houses a high-speed ISDN Internet Connection (powered through the National Broadband Network) with Brisbane through the State Library of Queensland.

== Demographics ==
In the 2011 census, the town of Miles had a population of 1,170 people.

In the 2016 census, the locality of Miles had a population of 1,746 people.

In the 2021 census, the locality of Miles had a population of 1,874 people.

== Economy ==
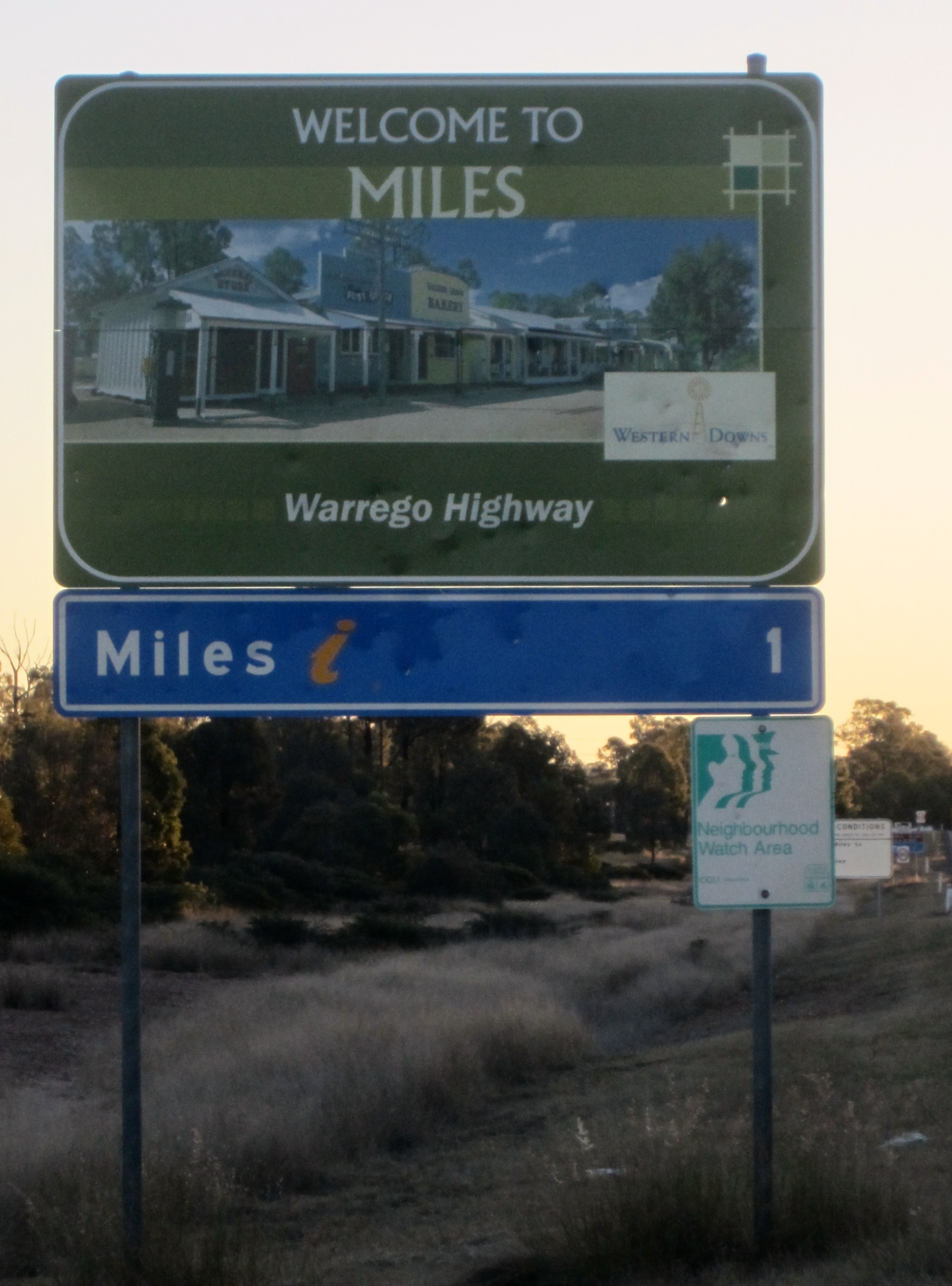
Welcome to Miles signpost on the western approach to Miles

The economy of Miles is based mainly on agriculture and cropping, producing wheat, sorghum, barley and cotton. Timber production is another area of economic activity and in common with much of Western Queensland, cattle and sheep grazing, including feedlots is widespread.

A mining industry utilising rich deposits of bentonite clay is developing.

In addition, there are the following developing industries:

- Coal seam gas
- coal mining
- electricity generation

== Education ==
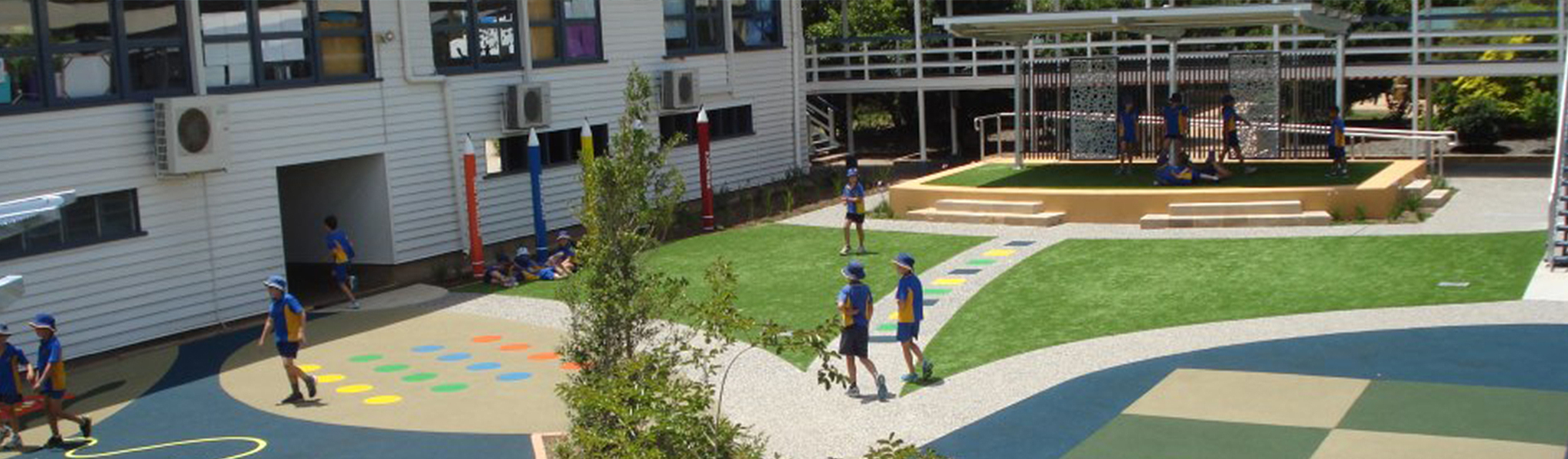
Miles State School, 2022

Miles State School is a government primary (Early Childhood to Year 6) school for boys and girls at Constance Street (26.6568°S 150.1856°E). In 2016, the school had an enrolment of 223 students with 18 teachers (16 full-time equivalent) with 12 non-teaching staff (9 full-time equivalent). In 2018, the school had an enrolment of 214 students with 19 teachers (17 full-time equivalent) and 14 non-teaching staff (9 full-time equivalent).

Miles State High School is a government secondary (7–12) school for boys and girls at Pine Street (26.6535°S 150.1851°E). In 2016, the school had an enrolment of 190 students with 22 teachers (21 full-time equivalent) and 20 non-teaching staff (13 full-time equivalent). In 2018, the school had an enrolment of 182 students with 18 teachers and 17 non-teaching staff (12 full-time equivalent).

== Amenities ==
Western Downs Regional Council operates Miles Library at Dogwood Crossing on the corner of Dawson and Murilla Streets and has a broadband ISDN Internet Connection to Brisbane (powered through the National Broadband Network) (26.6593°S 150.1865°E).

Redeemer Lutheran Church is at 114 Murilla Street (26.6600°S 150.1921°E).

The Miles branch of the Queensland Country Women's Association has its rooms in Corbett Drive (26.6599°S 150.1841°E).

== Attractions ==
Miles Historical Village Museum is at 141 Murilla Street. It is laid out in the style of town main street in an early Queensland rural town. There are 34 buildings including 15 historic structures relocated from the local area. It regarded as one of the best historical villages in Australia, and is used as a film set and special events venue, in addition to its normal operations as a museum. Every 2 years the town hosts the Miles Back to the Bush Festival in September, in and around the Miles Historical Village. The festival is the town's biggest event and features bush style entertainment with a vintage twist.

== Transport ==
Miles is connected to Brisbane, Toowoomba and Roma by the Warrego Highway and Goondiwindi and Rockhampton by the Leichhardt Highway. Greyhound Australia operates daily bus services between Brisbane and Mount Isa via Longreach and Charleville and between Toowoomba and Rockhampton, via Miles and also to Charleville.

The Westlander train also comes through Miles twice a week, on its way between Brisbane and Charleville, at very early hours of Wednesday & Friday mornings (Westbound Service 3S86) and Thursdays & Saturdays (Eastbound Service 3987).

The town is served by the Miles Airport (IATA: WLE) which is located along the Leichhardt Highway approximately 19 km (12 mi) south of the Leichhardt and Warrego Highway intersection, Miles, Queensland, and 14 km (8.7 mi) north of the Leichhardt Highway and Roma-Condamine Road intersection, Condamine, Queensland.

== Climate ==
Miles is on the Western Downs, at an elevation of 304 metres or 997 feet. The region around Miles has a fairly dry humid subtropical climate (Köppen Cfa) featuring hot summers with mean maximum temperatures in January of 33.4 °C or 92.1 °F, and mild to warm winters with a maximum of 19.6 °C or 67.3 °F in July. Winter mornings can be very cold and frost is common. Average rainfall is 609 millimetres or 23.98 inches, falling mainly in the period between November and March.

Climate data for Miles (1997–2024 norms, extremes 1910–present)
Month	Jan	Feb	Mar	Apr	May	Jun	Jul	Aug	Sep	Oct	Nov	Dec	Year
Record high °C (°F)	45.6 (114.1)	43.4 (110.1)	41.7 (107.1)	36.7 (98.1)	33.0 (91.4)	31.2 (88.2)	30.1 (86.2)	36.2 (97.2)	39.9 (103.8)	40.7 (105.3)	42.8 (109.0)	43.9 (111.0)	45.6 (114.1)
Mean daily maximum °C (°F)	34.0 (93.2)	33.0 (91.4)	31.4 (88.5)	27.8 (82.0)	23.7 (74.7)	20.5 (68.9)	20.2 (68.4)	22.9 (73.2)	26.7 (80.1)	29.7 (85.5)	31.4 (88.5)	33.1 (91.6)	27.9 (82.2)
Mean daily minimum °C (°F)	20.6 (69.1)	19.9 (67.8)	18.1 (64.6)	13.3 (55.9)	8.1 (46.6)	5.8 (42.4)	4.4 (39.9)	5.5 (41.9)	9.9 (49.8)	13.9 (57.0)	17.1 (62.8)	19.2 (66.6)	13.0 (55.4)
Record low °C (°F)	8.9 (48.0)	7.4 (45.3)	4.3 (39.7)	−2.1 (28.2)	−4.4 (24.1)	−6.1 (21.0)	−6.4 (20.5)	−5.4 (22.3)	−2.8 (27.0)	−0.6 (30.9)	3.4 (38.1)	4.4 (39.9)	−6.4 (20.5)
Average rainfall mm (inches)	67.3 (2.65)	73.9 (2.91)	67.8 (2.67)	24.4 (0.96)	27.0 (1.06)	34.1 (1.34)	21.4 (0.84)	30.0 (1.18)	26.9 (1.06)	47.9 (1.89)	61.5 (2.42)	86.9 (3.42)	569.1 (22.4)
Average rainy days (≥ 0.2 mm)	7.7	7.5	6.7	4.5	5.2	5.8	5.3	4.4	4.5	6.8	8.5	8.8	75.7
Source: Bureau of Meteorology
