= Woolooga Rail Bridge =

Heritage listed railway bridge in Queensland, Australia

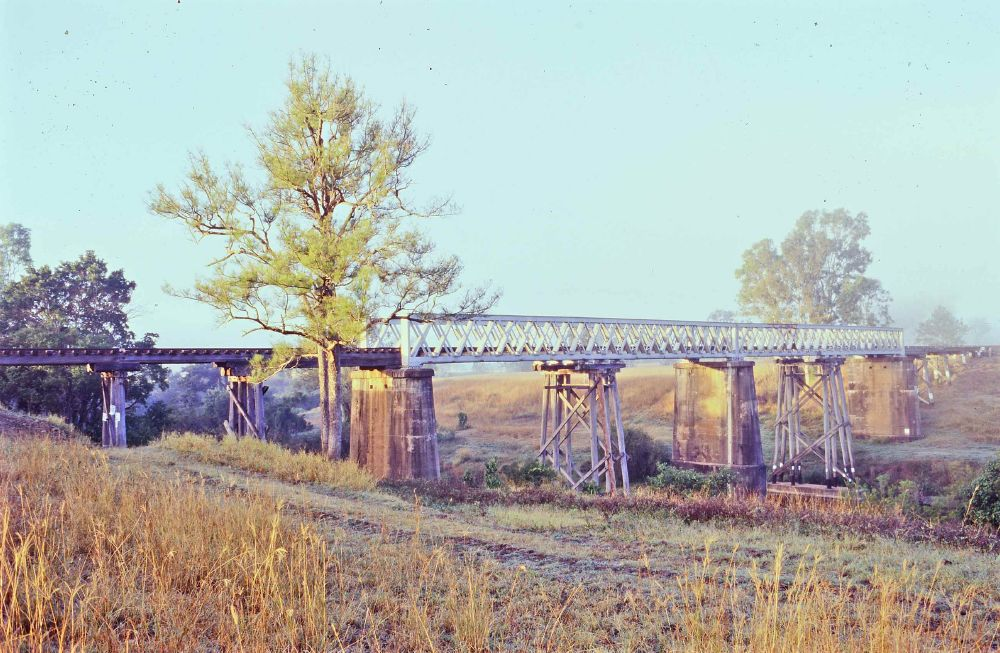
- Woolooga Rail Bridge

- Location within Queensland Location within Australia
- 26.0577°S 152.3796°E
- Location: Wide Bay Creek on the Theebine–Kilikivan railway line, Woolooga, Gympie Region, Queensland, Australia

History
- Design period: 1870s–1890s (late 19th century)
- Built: 1884

Queensland Heritage Register
- Official name: Woolooga Rail Bridge
- Type: state heritage (built)
- Designated: 21 October 1992
- Reference no.: 600645
- Significant period: 1880s, 1930s (fabric)
- Significant components: pier/s (bridge)
- Builders: Owen McDermott & Co.

Woolooga Rail Bridge is a heritage-listed railway bridge at Wide Bay Creek on the Theebine–Kilikivan railway line, Woolooga, Gympie Region, Queensland, Australia. It was built in 1884 by McDermott, Owen & Co. It was added to the Queensland Heritage Register on 21 October 1992.

== History ==
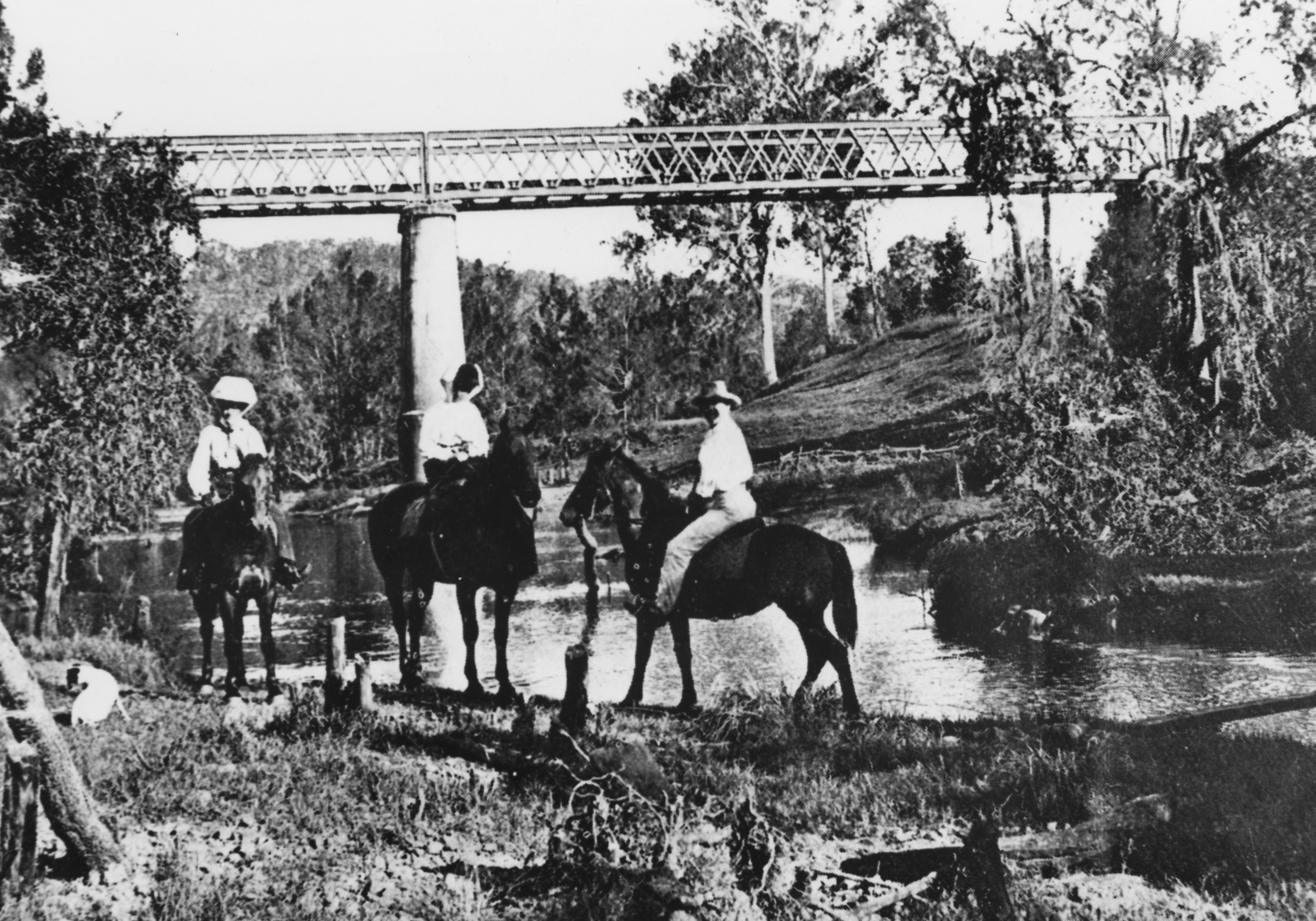
Horse riders by the Woolooga Rail Bridge, circa 1912

The Woolooga Rail Bridge was built in 1884 and crosses Wide Bay Creek on the Maryborough to Kilkivan branch line.

The Kilkivan branch was built while the Maryborough Railway was not connected to any other system. A short section to Dickabram on the bank of the Mary River was opened on 1 January 1886. The section to Kilkivan opened on 6 December 1886 after the completion of the major combined Dickabram rail-road bridge over the Mary River.

The Kilkivan branch, built in the hope of stimulating gold and copper mining, was ultimately extended to serve the South Burnett. Besides a major bridge over the Mary River, the Kilkivan branch crossed Wide Bay Creek three times. Tenders were called for just 4 miles (6.4 km), and had to be called twice as the short length made the project unattractive to contractors. The work for the whole section to Kilkivan was let to MCDermott, Owen & Co in August 1884.

In order to strengthen the bridge to permit C17 locomotives to operate, instead of just PB15 and B15 classes, the 100-foot (30 m) spans were divided in the 1933–35 period by inserting timber piers at the centre of each span.

== Description ==
The Woolooga Rail Bridge, Wide Bay No. 2 Crossing Bridge, at 25.14 kilometres (15.62 mi) comprises two 100-foot (30 m) lattice girder spans with steel cross girders and timber longitudinals supported on concrete piers with timber piers on a concrete base at the centre of each span.

== Heritage listing ==
Woolooga Rail Bridge was listed on the Queensland Heritage Register on 21 October 1992 having satisfied the following criteria.

The place is important in demonstrating the evolution or pattern of Queensland's history.

The Woolooga Rail Bridge is important in demonstrating the pattern of Queensland's history in particular the development of the railway network from Maryborough and the development of gold and copper mining in the Kilkivan area.

The place is important in demonstrating the principal characteristics of a particular class of cultural places.

The Woolooga Rail Bridge is an example of a lattice girder bridge dating from the 1880s still in use, although the spans have been halved by extra piers.
