= Michael McDermott (businessman) =

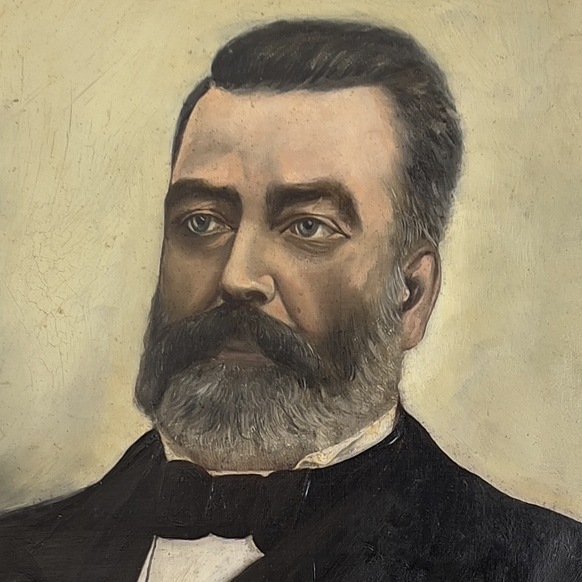
- Portrait probably painted by his son Thomas
- Born: c. 1826; County Leitrim, Ireland
- Died: 8 June 1903 (aged 76–77); Drysdale, Victoria, Australia
- Occupations: Timber merchant, civil contractor, inventor
- Known for: Railway construction, Coriyule estate
- Spouse(s): Mary Small (m. 1855), Alice Jones (m. 1900)
- Children: 2

Michael McDermott (1826–1903) was an Irish-Australian businessman, civil contractor, and inventor. He is known for his contributions to the expansion of Australia’s rural railway network and infrastructure during the late 19th century, and for his ownership of the Coriyule estate near Drysdale, Victoria.

== Early life ==
Michael McDermott was born circa 1826 in County Leitrim, Ireland, likely in the Catholic parish of Aughavas near Carrigallen. His parents were Mary (maiden name also McDermott) and Peter McDermott, a farmer. He grew up in Drumerkeane Townland (Droim ar Céin), a rural area near Aughavas.

Between 1845 and 1852, Ireland was affected by a potato blight, resulting in a widespread famine known as "The Great Hunger." This period saw a significant wave of emigration.

== Migration to Australia ==
In 1852, McDermott emigrated to Australia. He sailed on the SV Argo, which departed Liverpool on 8 October 1852 and arrived in Port Phillip, Melbourne on 19 January 1853. His younger brothers, Thomas and James also migrated around the same time, but on a separate voyage. This was a time of great economic expansion in Australia, particularly in Victoria, due to the recent discovery of gold and the ensuing gold rush. Evidently he was able to take advantage of the opportunities that came with this period of economic and social change.

=== Places of residence ===
In 1874, McDermott purchased a house in Fairview Ave, Geelong, Victoria, which at the time was on six acres of land. It appears he extended the house prior to moving in. Over the next twenty years he and his family lived there (except during extended stays in Queensland and Kilmore, when he would rent the house out). In 1894 he acquired the Coriyule Homestead and estate, 15km east of Geelong on Corio Bay, near Drysdale, where he relocated and resided with his family until his death.

== Career ==
McDermott began his career as a timber merchant. He built this business up over at least a decade before expanding into civil engineering projects. These later projects spanned a number of Australian colonies, where he led major infrastructure and railway projects from the 1860s to the 1890s.

=== Timber merchant ===
By 1855, McDermott was married and living in Geelong. He operated a timber merchant business and sawmill, on Little Myers Street, supplying wood products, such as tongue-and-groove floorboards and weatherboards for building construction as well as railway sleepers.

=== Road construction ===
By the mid-1860s, McDermott had become a road contractor, engaged in government projects to construct and improve rural roads west of Geelong. This work provided the foundation for his later railway construction ventures, and continued throughout the 1870's.

=== Railway and bridge construction ===
==== South Australia ====
In 1879, McDermott partnered with Lewis Moline and James King in the firm Moline McDermott & Co. They were contracted to build a 21.5-mile (34.4 km) branch line between Petersburg (now known as Peterborough) and Jamestown in South Australia, at a cost of £46,725. It was completed within a year and opened by the South Australian Governor on 14 December 1880. This was part of a major rail connection between Broken Hill, New South Wales, and Port Pirie, South Australia. After the successful completion of the project the business partnership was dissolved in July 1881.

==== Victoria, 1881–1883 ====
Between 1881 and 1883, McDermott, McNeil & Bath constructed three railway lines in Victoria:

1. Colac to Camperdown (September 1881-July 1882), 30 miles (48 km), at a cost of £47,420
2. Benalla to St James (1882, completed August 1883), 28.4 miles (45.4 km), with 17 bridges to accommodate the line, at a cost of £28,921
3. Gordon to North Ballarat Junction (1883), 18 miles (29 km), at a cost of £29,000

==== Queensland, 1883–1886 ====
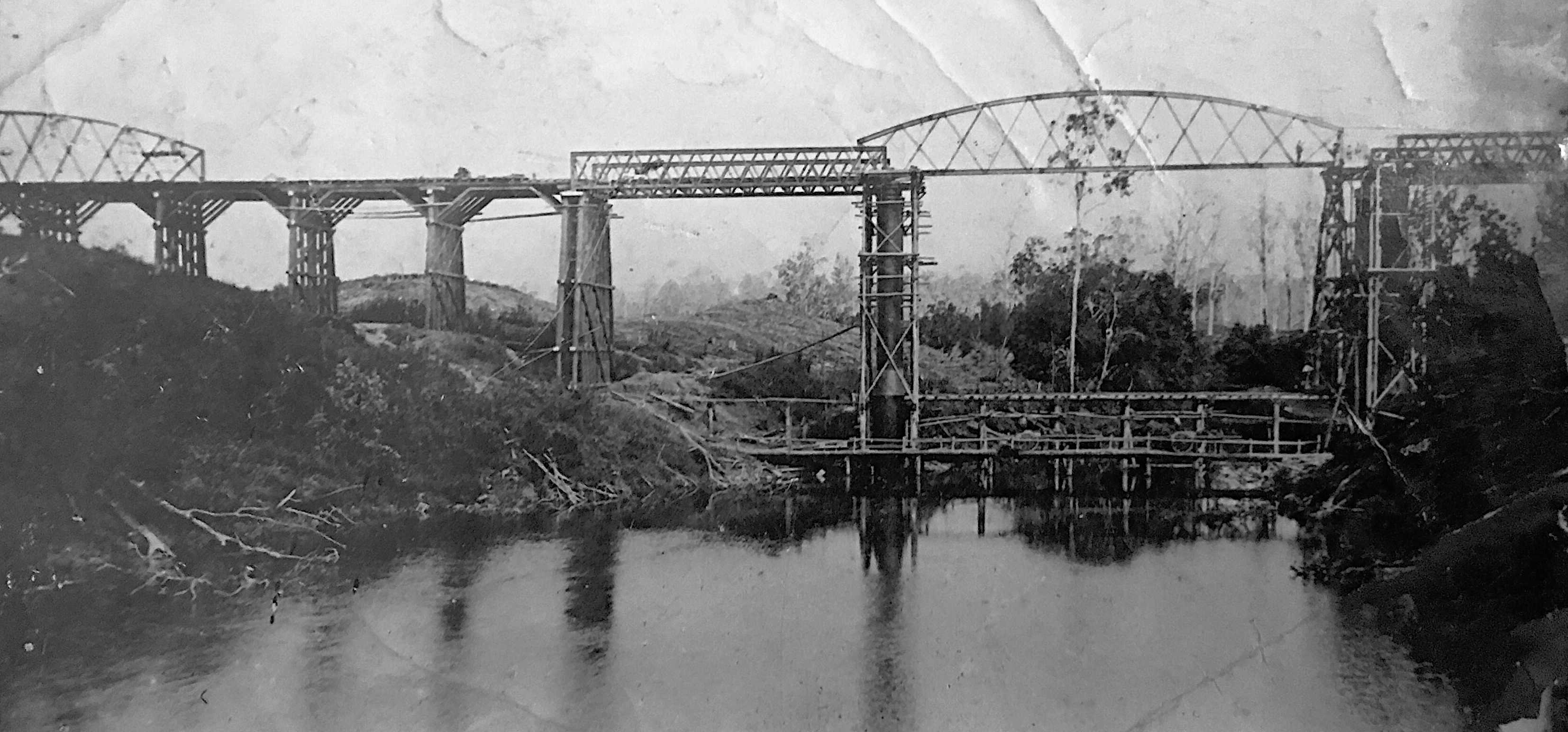
Dickabram Bridge during construction, 1884

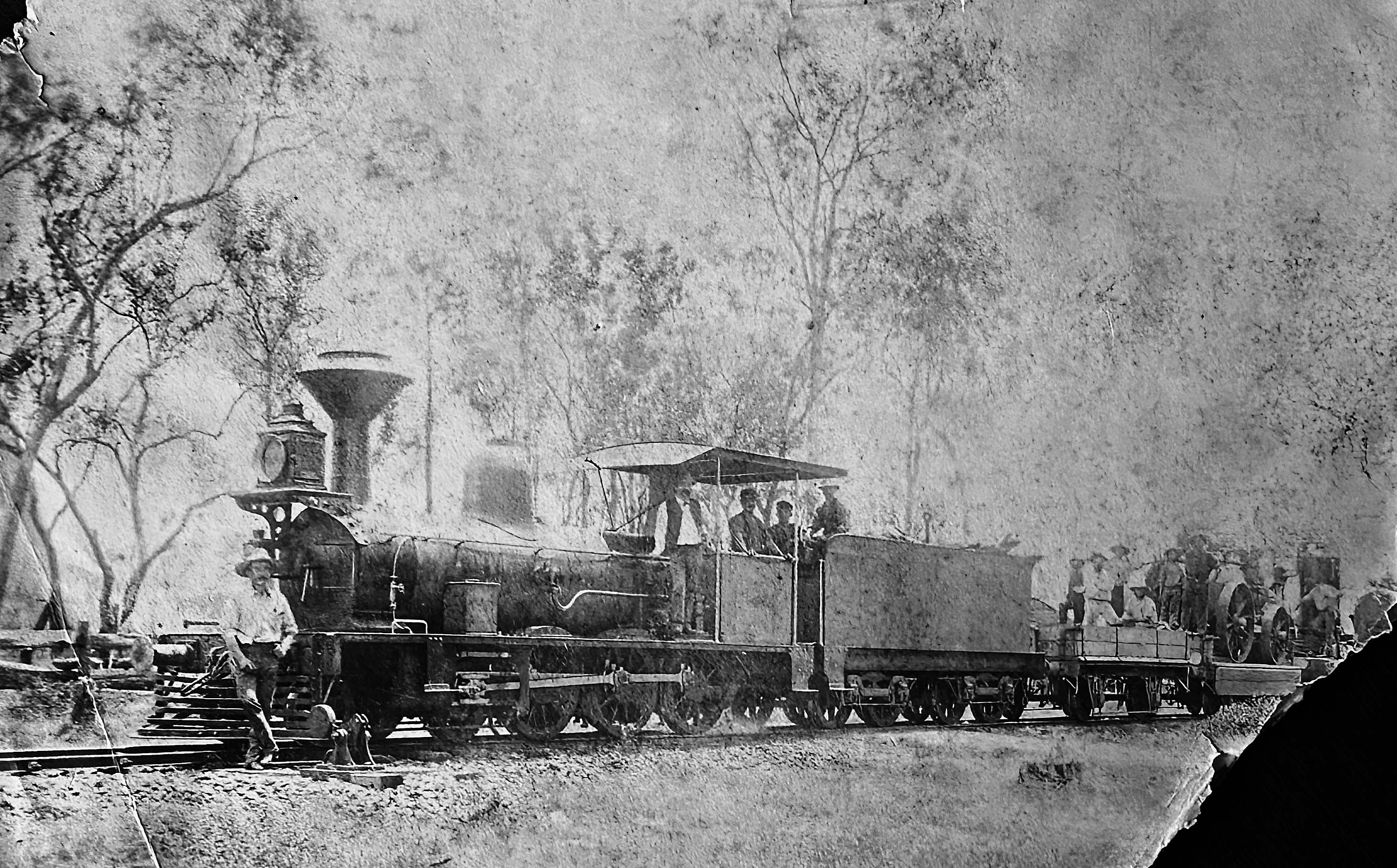
Packing down equipment at completion of Kilkivan project

In 1883, McDermott relocated his family to Miva, Queensland, for a railway contract. McDermott Owen & Co. constructed the Kilkivan to Kilkivan Junction branch line between 1884 and 1886. It was 55 miles (88 km) in length. The project was part of the Mary Valley railway and included the construction of the Dickabram Bridge and the wrought iron Woolooga rail bridge. Both bridges are heritage-listed sites.

==== Victoria, 1888–1891 ====
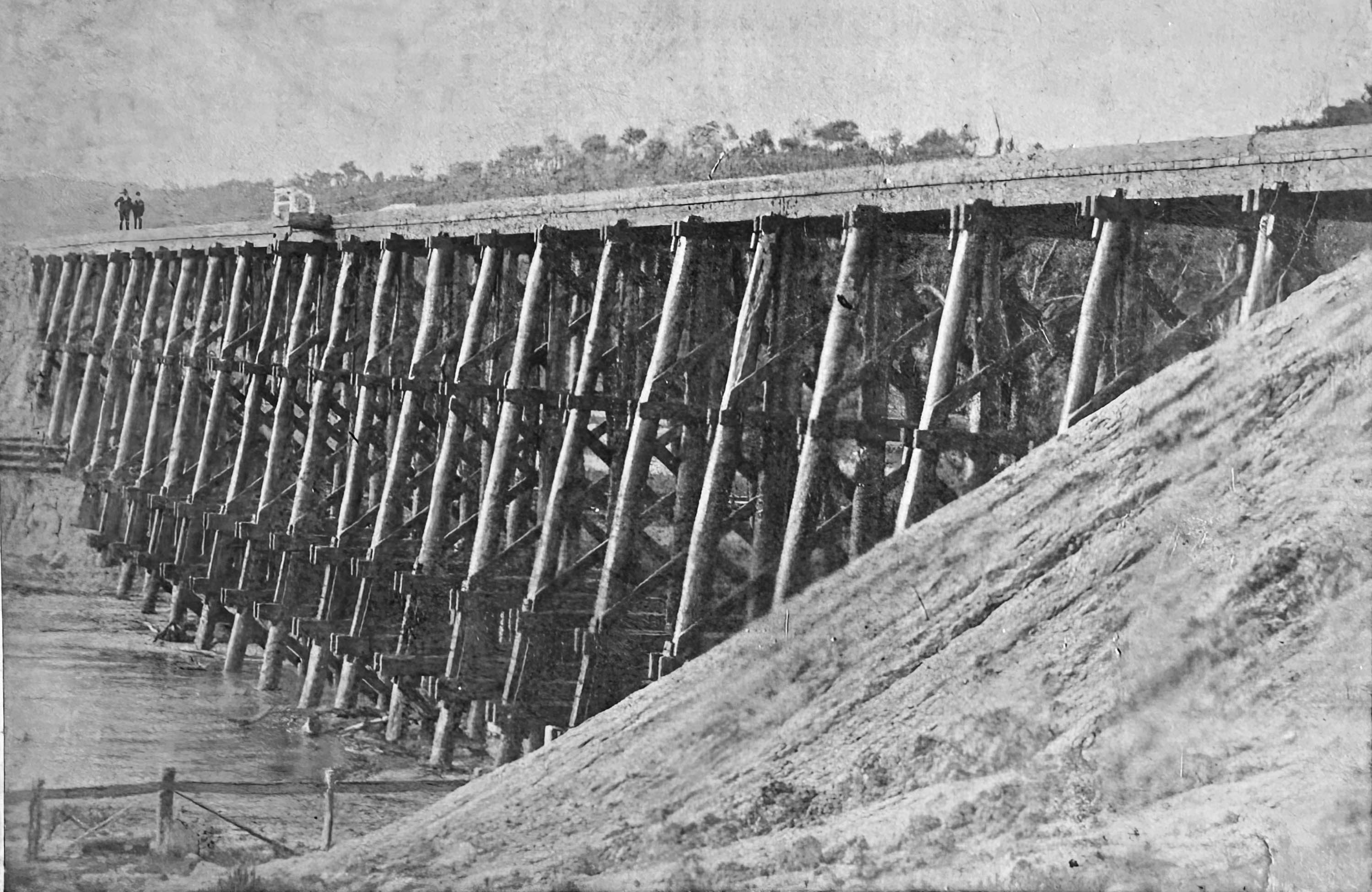
Newly completed Pyalong Rail Bridge, crossing Mollison Creek, 1891

After returning from Queensland, McDermott & Sons built the Heathcote to Kilmore branch line (1888–91) in central Victoria. This was part of the Wandong, Heathcote and Sandhurst railway project, which was an outcome of the "Octopus Act" of 1884. The 30-mile (48 km) line included two wooden trestle bridges at Pyalong, also built by McDermott & Sons, for a tender of £115,024.

== Inventions and patents ==
McDermott and his sons were granted patents related to railway engineering and agriculture:

- 1891: "Improved mechanism for locking and releasing trap-doors in the bottom of ballast trucks" (with sons Peter and Thomas)

There is evidence his son Peter continued similar engineering work after his father's death:

- 1910: "Patent for improvements in plow shares and points therefor" (patent co-assigned to Thomas)

It is not known if these inventions were commercialized in any way.

== Coriyule estate ==
=== Circumstances and acquisition ===
Between 1883 and 1889 there was an extraordinary speculative land boom in Victoria, and following the collapse of the boom there was the subsequent economic depression of the 1890's.

Location of Coriyule Homestead and Scarborough House (no longer extant), south-west of the homestead

In early 1892, the Scarborough Estate and Land Investment Company (SELIC), which had an interest in the Coriyule Estate and its surrounding lots, was adversely exposed to this collapse and came into an on-going financial crisis. Subsequent to this land crisis was the banking crisis of 1893, which resulted in McDermott becoming a creditor to the Colonial Bank, which was in turn a creditor to SELIC. In 1894, McDermott acquired 804 acres of the Coriyule Estate from SELIC, presumably in lieu of its financial debt to him.

Upon acquisition of the estate he took up residence there with his family. He then built a second residence, 'Scarborough', a twelve room weatherboard house which was occupied by his sons and their families.

Following SELIC's continuing financial difficulties, and McDermott's status as a creditor to the bank, McDermott acquired two adjacent lots in 1895, expanding the estate to 1215 acres.

=== Architecture ===
The Coriyule homestead, built in 1849 for Anne Drysdale and Caroline Newcomb, is a two-story Gothic Revival mansion designed by Charles Laing. It features mixed stonework and steep gabled roofs with decorative bargeboards.

=== Farming ===
The estate supported crops such as oats, peas, barley, potatoes, and onions, along with sheep, cattle, and horse breeding. In 1896, McDermott won a prize for best dairy cow at the Geelong Agricultural Show.

=== Subdivision ===
After the deaths of sons Thomas (1912) and Peter (1914), the estate was subdivided in 1922, with much of the original estate being sold. The homestead was sold, but Scarborough was retained by the family, where some members continued to reside. Thomas' son, Peter Paul, continued farming the remaining unsold allotments into the 1940s. Some portions of the previous estate still remain in the hands of descendants.

== Personal life ==
McDermott married Mary Small in 1855 at St Mary of the Angels in Geelong. They had two sons, Thomas (b. 1857) and Peter (b. 1860), who became active partners in his railway contracting business. After Mary’s death, McDermott married Alice Jones in 1900. He died on 8 June 1903 at the Coriyule estate, aged 77.

== Notable descendants ==
John Paul Morris AM (great-grandson) served as Tasmania’s Chief Magistrate from 1987 to 1994
