= Henry Charles Stanley =

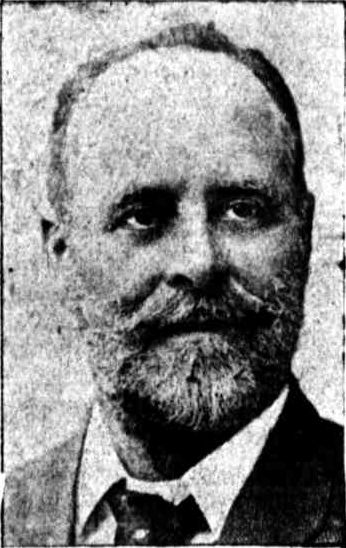
Henry Charles Stanley, 1914

Henry Charles Stanley (1840–1921) was the chief engineer of the railways in Queensland, Australia.

== Early life ==
Henry Charles Stanley was born in Edinburgh, Scotland, in 1840, the son of Montague Talbot Stanley and his wife Mary née Eyre. His brother Francis Drummond Greville Stanley was a Queensland Colonial Architect.

Stanley studied for 2 years at Edinburgh University before being articled to Messrs B. and E. Blyth, civil engineers who acted as consultants to the Scottish railways.

In 1863 Stanley emigrated to Queensland.

== Engineering career ==
On arrival in Queensland, Stanley was employed by the railway department of the Queensland Government. In 1872, he was put in charge of engineering for the southern and western railways. In 1886, the central railways also became his responsibility. In 1891, he was formally appointed the Chief Engineer for the entire Queensland network.

He also spent a year as engineer for the railways in Marlborough, New Zealand.

His major designs included:

- circa 1883: Dickabram Bridge over the Mary River at Miva
- circa 1883: Lockyer Creek Railway Bridge at Clarendon
- 1885: Angellala Rail Bridge near Charleville
- 1893: the second Albert Railway Bridge over the Brisbane River at Indooroopilly, Brisbane. This was a replacement for the first, which had just been destroyed in the 1893 Brisbane flood)
- circa 1895: Burdekin River Rail Bridge in Macrossan near Charters Towers
- 1898: the Alexandra Railway Bridge at Rockhampton

== Later life ==
Stanley died at his residence in the New Farm district of Brisbane, on 23 February 1921.
