= Munna Creek =

- Suburb
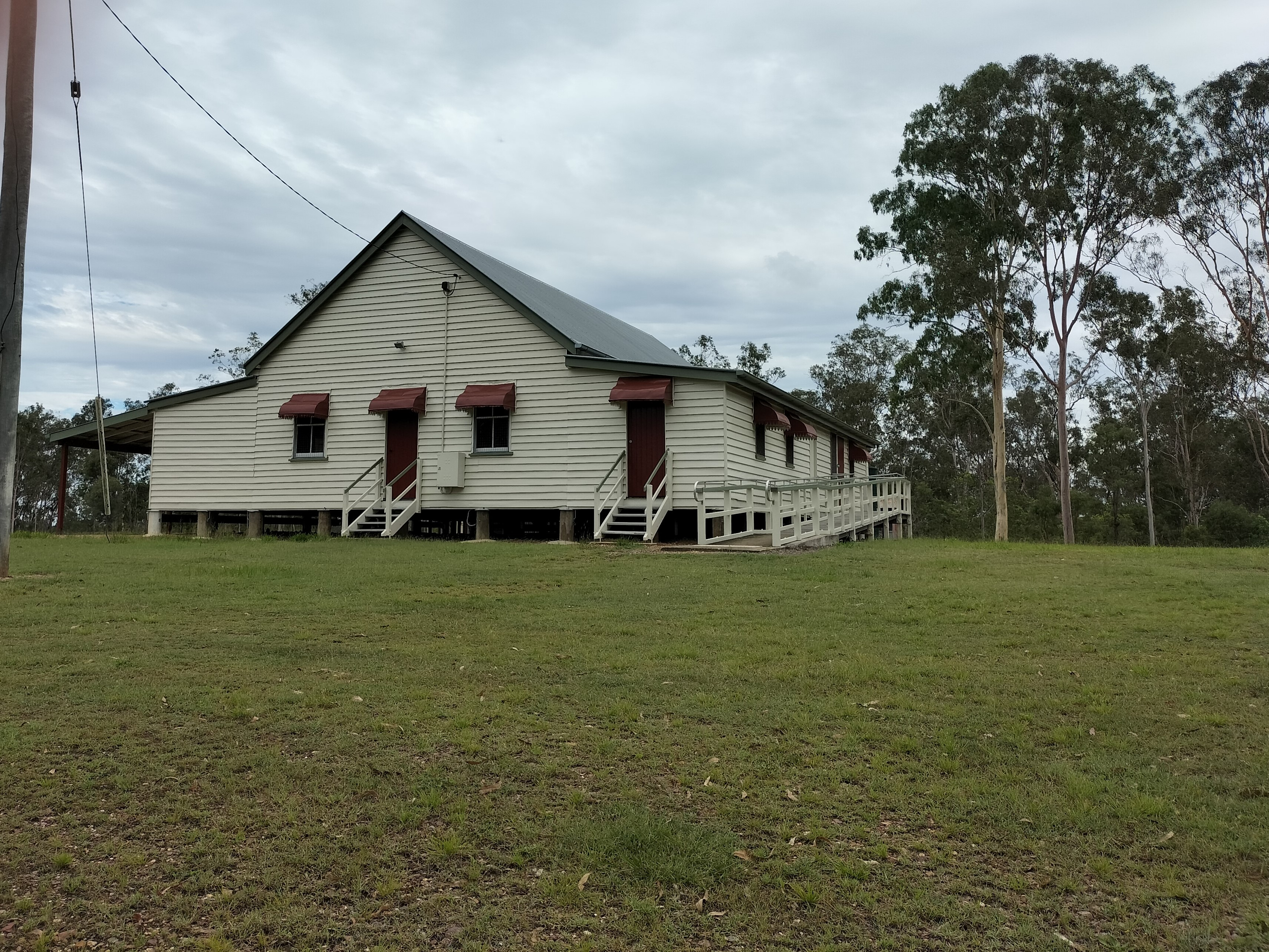
- Munna Creek Hall, 2023

- Interactive map of Munna Creek
- Coordinates: 25.8865°S 152.45245°E
- Country: Australia
- State: Queensland
- LGAs: Fraser Coast Region; Gympie Region
- Location: 58.9 km (36.6 mi) NNW of Gympie; 54.0 km (33.6 mi) SW of Maryborough; 87.1 km (54.1 mi) SSW of Hervey Bay; 230 km (140 mi) N of Brisbane

Government
  - State electorates: Gympie; Maryborough
  - Federal division: Wide Bay

Area
  - Total: 41.2 km^{2} (15.9 sq mi)

Population
  - Total: 22 (2021 census)
  - Density: 0.534/km^{2} (1.38/sq mi)
- Time zone: UTC+10:00 (AEST)
- Postcode: 4570
Suburbs around Munna Creek
| Mount Urah | Mount Urah | Gundiah |
| Glen Echo | Munna Creek | Paterson |
| Glen Echo | Glen Echo | Miva |

Munna Creek is a rural locality split between the Fraser Coast Region and the Gympie Region, in Queensland, Australia. In the 2021 census, Munna Creek had a population of 22 people.

== Geography ==
The Mary River forms most of the eastern and north-eastern boundary of the locality, entering from the east (Miva / Paterson) and exiting to the north-east (Mount Urah / Gundiah). The watercourse Munna Creek enters the locality from the south (Glen Echo) and forms a short section of the south-western boundary of the locality before meandering through the locality and becomes a tributary of the Mary River on the locality's eastern boundary.

The Bauple Woolooga Road forms the south-eastern boundary of the locality.

Completed in November 2025, Munna Creek Solar Farm is in the west of the locality. It is expected to generate 300,000 megawatt hours per year.

The land use is predominantly grazing on native vegetation with some crop growing.

== History ==
Miva station was part of the Mount Uhra pastoral run owned by Gideon A. Scott in 1851. It was a sheep property. At that time Munna Creek was described:-"for about ten miles above its junction with the Mary river, is navigable for boats, and is a broad sheet of fresh water, varying from fifteen to thirty yards wide."

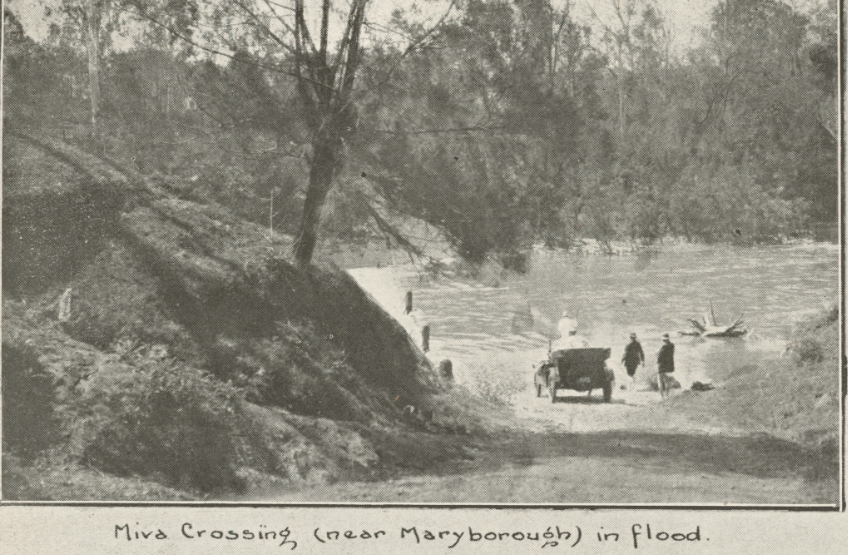
Miva Crossing (near Maryborough) in flood. 1917

Prior to the building of the Bauple Woolooga Road the Munna Miva road crossed the Mary River at the Miva Crossing. After the flood waters entered the Miva Crossing Hotel (Mr. J. Orphant's), notwithstanding the fact that it stood on an unusually high bank, the hotel was moved to the top of the hill where it later became a residence with a store in front.

Munna Creek Provisional School was officially opened on 26 May 1890 by its first teacher Miss Ryan. On 1 January 1909, it became Munna Creek State School. It closed on 12 December 1986. The school was at 1458 Bauple Woolooga Road (25.8963°S 152.4778°E).

In 1905, 3 acres (1.2 ha) was reserved for a cemetery in the parish of Miva. In 1938, the Miva Cemetery was renamed the Munna Creek Cemetery, and the Dickabram Cemetery was renamed the Miva Cemetery. References to the Munna Creek Cemetery appear from 1910, which was just after the Dickabram Cemetery was established. The Dickabram Bridge had been built near the new location of Miva.

Munna Creek Hall, also variously known as the Adventure Hall and the Munna Creek Public Hall, was officially opened on Saturday 18 August 1906. It was built by the Munna Creek Adventure Hall Company.

In March 1911, tenders were called to construct a church at Munna Creek. Christ Church Anglican was dedicated in 1911. It was located on the northern side of Blowers Road to the west of the school and public hall (approx 25.8969°S 152.4742°E). In 1947 the church was moved to 11 King Street, Gunalda, where it retained the name Christ Church Anglican.

The Munna Creek Country Music Festival was first held in 2011 and was held annually (except for 2020 due to the COVID-19 pandemic) until it was permanently cancelled in 2021. Munna Creek Country Music Walk Up Weekend continues.

== Demographics ==
In the 2016 census, Munna Creek had a population of 23 people.

In the 2021 census, Munna Creek had a population of 22 people.

== Education ==
There are no schools in Munna Creek. The nearest government primary schools are Gundiah State School in neighbouring Gundiah to the north-east and Theebine State School in Theebine to the south-east. The nearest government secondary schools are Kilkivan State School (to Year 10) in Kilkivan to the south-west, James Nash State High School (to Year 12) in Gympie to the south-east, and Maryborough State High School (to Year 12) in Maryborough to the north-east.

== Amenities ==
Munna Creek Hall is on Blowers Road (25.8971°S 152.4759°E) but is accessible from the recreational reserve (former school) at 1458 Bauple Woolooga Road. Free camping is available in the hall's 15-acre (6.1 ha) grounds.

== Facilities ==
Despite its name, Munna Creek Cemetery is 1437 Bauple Woolooga Road in neighbouring Miva to the south-east (25.8943°S 152.4805°E). It is operated by the Fraser Coast Regional Council and provides options for monumental graves and a columbarium wall in a quiet bushland setting.

== Events ==
Munna Creek Country Music Walk Up Weekends are open-mic events where people can sing country music songs with a full backing band. They are held at the Munna Creek Hall three times a year.

== Heritage listing ==
Fraser Coast Regional Council has placed the following sites on its local heritage register:

- Munna Creek Hall and grounds, Blowers Road
- Munna Creek Cemetery (also known as Miva Cemetery), Bauple Woolooga Road
