= Sexton, Queensland =

Sexton
- Suburb
- Interactive map of Sexton
- Coordinates: 26.0316°S 152.4769°E
- Country: Australia
- State: Queensland
- LGA: Gympie Region
- Location: 22.6 km (14.0 mi) NW of Gympie; 198 km (123 mi) NNW of Brisbane

Government
  - State electorate: Gympie
  - Federal division: Wide Bay

Area
  - Total: 61.4 km^{2} (23.7 sq mi)

Population
  - Total: 187 (2021 census)
  - Density: 3.046/km^{2} (7.888/sq mi)
- Time zone: UTC+10:00 (AEST)
- Postcode: 4570
Suburbs around Sexton
Woolooga	Miva	Scotchy Pocket
Woolooga	Sexton	Curra
Lower Wonga	Lower Wonga	Bells Bridge

Sexton is a rural locality in the Gympie Region, Queensland, Australia. In the 2021 census, Sexton had a population of 187 people.

== History ==
The Nanango railway line opened in December 1886 as far as Kilkivan with the locality being served by Sexton railway station (26.0063°S 152.4367°E). The railway line through Sexton was mothballed in 2006 and officially closed in 2010.

Carmyle Provisional School opened on 30 July 1906. On 1 January 1909, it became Carmyle State School. It closed in 1910. The school reopened in 1911 when it was described as being 21 by 14 feet (6.4 by 4.3 m) plus a verandah and was well-ventilated with six windows and a door. At that time, it had 16 students under teacher Miss Grace Smith. The school closed in December 1963. In 1921, the school was on the eastern side of Devil Mountain Road (26.04049°S 152.46423°E). From 1936 to 1961, it was on the eastern corner of Lower Wide Bay Road and Carmyle Road (26.03520°S 152.48014°E).

Sexton Provisional School opened in 1913. On 1 December 1914, it became Sexton State School. In March 1922, it became a half-time provisional school in conjunction with Miva Provisional School (meaning the two schools shared a single teacher who taught at each school in alternating weeks). The two schools were closed in September 1924. The school was on a 2-acre (0.81 ha) site in the north-eastern corner of the council's gravel reserve (approx 26.00127°S 152.43871°E).

== Demographics ==
In the 2016 census, Sexton had a population of 161 people.

In the 2021 census, Sexton had a population of 187 people.

== Education ==
There are no schools in Sexton. The nearest government primary schools are Woolooga State School in neighbouring Woolooga to the west, Theebine State School in Theebine to the north-east, and Chatsworth State School in Chatsworth to the south-east. The nearest government secondary school is James Nash State High School in Gympie to the south-east.

There are also non-government schools in Gympie and its suburbs.
