= Scotchy Pocket, Queensland =

Scotchy Pocket
- Suburb
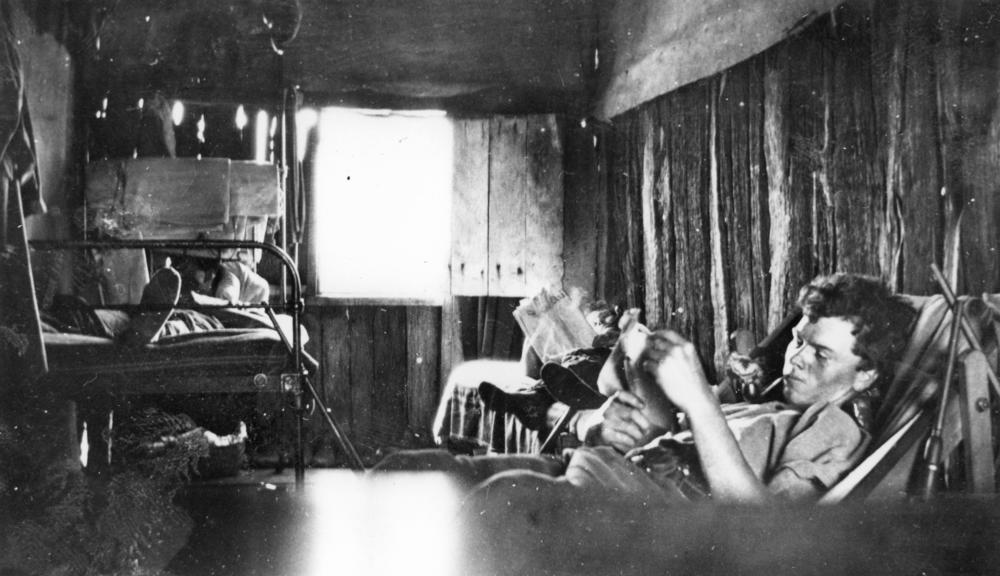
- Young men in their living quarters on a Scotchy Pocket farm, 1910-1920

- Interactive map of Scotchy Pocket
- Coordinates: 26.0061°S 152.5261°E
- Country: Australia
- State: Queensland
- LGA: Gympie Region
- Location: 30.4 km (18.9 mi) NNW of Gympie; 61.7 km (38.3 mi) SSW of Maryborough; 209 km (130 mi) N of Brisbane

Government
  - State electorate: Gympie
  - Federal division: Wide Bay

Area
  - Total: 41.4 km^{2} (16.0 sq mi)

Population
  - Total: 55 (2021 census)
  - Density: 1.329/km^{2} (3.44/sq mi)
- Time zone: UTC+10:00 (AEST)
- Postcode: 4570
Suburbs around Scotchy Pocket
Miva	Theebine	Gunalda
Sexton	Scotchy Pocket	Gunalda
Sexton	Curra	Curra

Scotchy Pocket is a rural locality in the Gympie Region, Queensland, Australia. In the 2021 census, Scotchy Pocket had a population of 55 people.

== Geography ==
The locality is bounded to the west by the Mary River and to the south by Curra Creek, a tributary of the Mary River.

The terrain ranges from 20 to 240 metres (66 to 787 ft) above sea level. Scotchy Pocket has the following two mountains, both in the south-east of the locality:

- Mount Booker (26.0385°S 152.5480°E) 189 metres (620 ft)
- Mount Scotchy (26.0308°S 152.5472°E) 240 metres (790 ft)

Although not within the locality, the Bruce Highway and North Coast railway line run close to the south-east boundary of the locality. For many years, Scotchy Pocket was served by Kadina railway station (26.0268°S 152.5604°E), but it was eliminated during a 1990s realignment to reduce curves and increase speeds.

The land use is predominantly grazing on native vegetation with some crop growing (mostly near the Mary River).

== History ==
Scotchy Pocket Provisional School opened in 1900. On 1 January 1909, it became Scotchy Pocket State School. The school closed in 1920 due to low student numbers. It reopened in 1938 and finally closed circa 1944. In 1921, it was on a 4-acre (1.6 ha) land parcel on an unnamed road off Scotchy Pocket Road (26.01237°S 152.51178°E). In 1941, it was located on the western side of Scotchy Pocket Road (approx 26.0084°S 152.5195°E).

== Demographics ==
In the 2016 census, Scotchy Pocket had a population of 74 people.

In the 2021 census, Scotchy Pocket had a population of 55 people.

== Education ==
There are no schools in Scotchy Pocket. The nearest government primary schools are Gunalda State School in neighbouring Gunalda to the east and Theebine State School in neighbouring Theebine to the north. The nearest government secondary school is James Nash State High School in Gympie to the south-west.
