= Curra, Queensland =

Curra
- Suburb
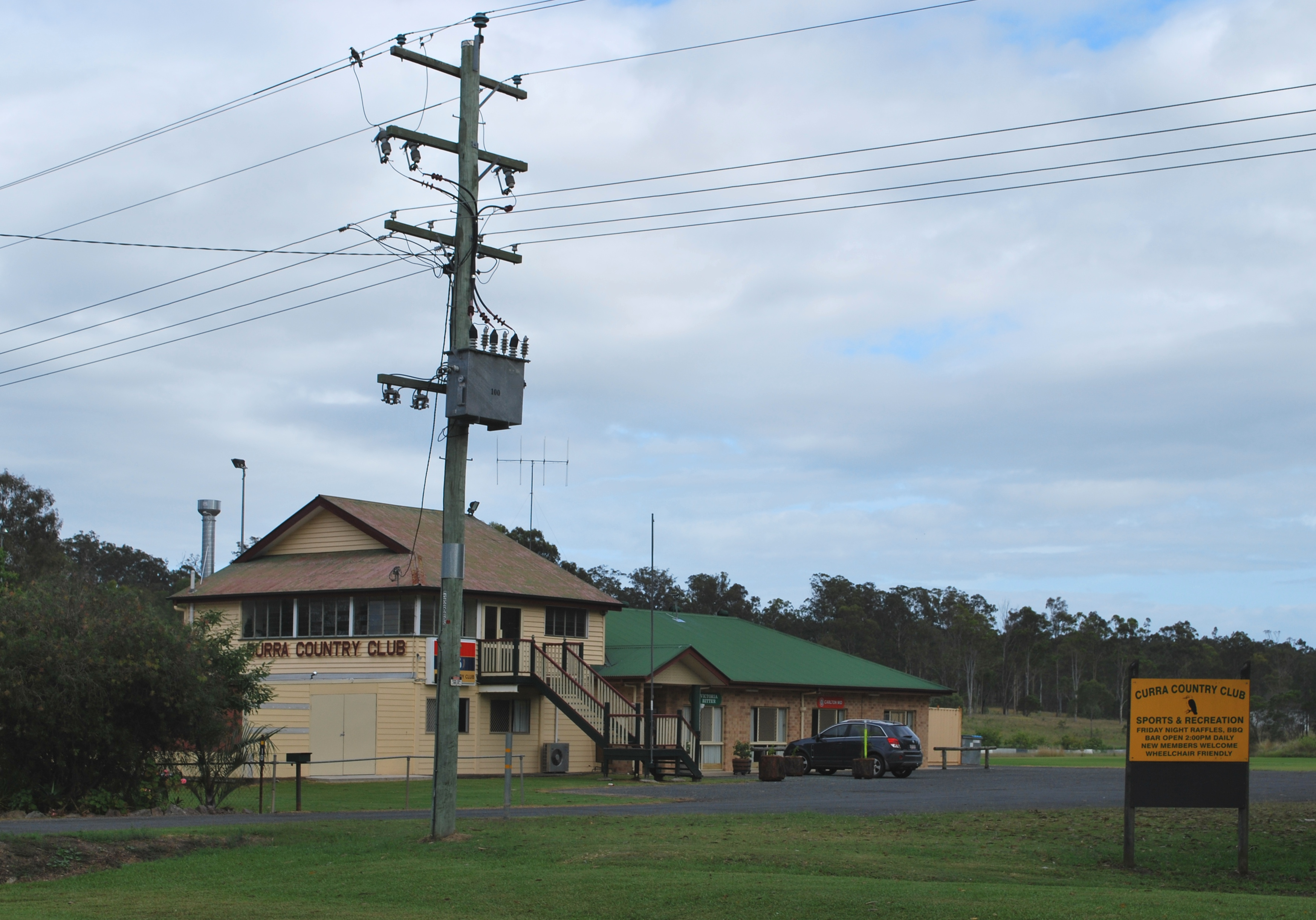
- Curra Country Club

- Interactive map of Curra
- Coordinates: 26.0708°S 152.5894°E
- Country: Australia
- State: Queensland
- LGA: Gympie Region
- Location: 11.0 km (6.8 mi) S of Gunalda; 20.8 km (12.9 mi) NNW of Gympie; 186 km (116 mi) N of Brisbane

Government
  - State electorate: Gympie
  - Federal division: Wide Bay

Area
  - Total: 102.2 km^{2} (39.5 sq mi)

Population
  - Total: 2,104 (2021 census)
  - Density: 20.587/km^{2} (53.32/sq mi)
- Time zone: UTC+10:00 (AEST)
- Postcode: 4570
Suburbs around Curra
Scotchy Pocket	Gunalda	Anderleigh
Sexton	Curra	North Deep Creek
Bells Bridge	Chatsworth	Corella

Curra is a rural residential locality in the Gympie Region, Queensland, Australia. In the 2021 census, Curra had a population of 2,104 people.

== Geography ==
Curra is in the Wide Bay–Burnett region of Queensland. It also belongs to the non-functional administrative unit known as the County of March.

The Mary River forms the western boundary, and Curra Creek is part of the northern boundary. To the east of the locality is a large portion of Curra State Forest.

Mount Corella is in the south of the locality (26.1151°S 152.6149°E) rising to 336 metres (1,102 ft).

The Bruce Highway passes through the locality, entering from the south-east (Bells Bridge) and exiting to the north (Gunalda).

The North Coast railway line passes through the locality, entering from the south-west (Corella) and exiting to the north (Scotchy Pocket / Gunalda) with two railway stops (from north to south):

- Curra railway station (26.0711°S 152.5917°E)
- Harvey's Siding (26.0870°S 152.6122°E)

Curra is zoned rural/residential with working pastoral farms and small acreages.

== History ==
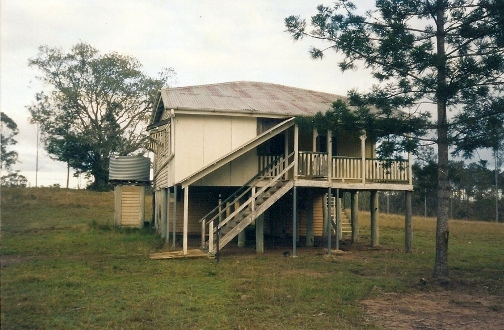
Original home of Cliff Jones

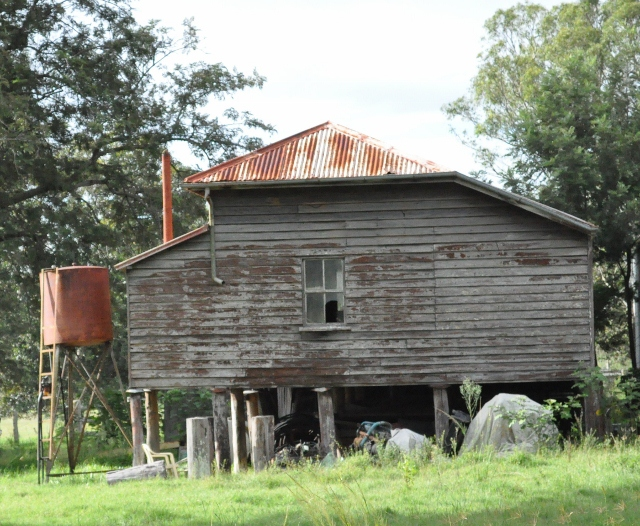
Old farmhouse at Curra

In 1887, 23,500 acres (9,500 ha) of land were resumed from the Curra pastoral run. The land was offered for selection for the establishment of small farms on 17 April 1887.

Curra Provisional School opened on 17 July 1893. On 1 January 1909 it became Curra State School. It closed in 1961. It was at approximately 6 Curra Road (26.0738°S 152.5891°E).

There was a mine in the Curra Estate Road area and there is a working limestone quarry.

Curra Post Office opened by 1916 (a receiving office had been open from 1892) and closed in 1977.

Curra was once part of Shire of Tiaro but, since 2008, is within the Gympie Region local government area.

== Demographics ==
In the 2006 census, Curra had a population of 1,372 people.

In the 2016 census, Curra had a population of 1,920 people.

In the 2021 census, Curra had a population of 2,104 people.

== Education ==
There are no schools in Curra. The nearest government primary schools are Gunalda State School in neighbouring Gunalda to the north and Chatsworth State School in neighbouring Chatsworth to the south. The nearest government secondary school is James Nash State High School in Gympie to the south-east.
