= Paterson, Queensland =

Paterson
- Suburb
- Interactive map of Paterson
- Coordinates: 25.89°S 152.5222°E
- Country: Australia
- State: Queensland
- LGA: Fraser Coast Region
- Location: 42.5 km (26.4 mi) N of Gympie; 46.1 km (28.6 mi) SSW of Maryborough; 76.2 km (47.3 mi) SSW of Hervey Bay; 221 km (137 mi) N of Brisbane

Government
  - State electorate: Gympie
  - Federal division: Wide Bay

Area
  - Total: 28.5 km^{2} (11.0 sq mi)

Population
  - Total: 157 (2021 census)
  - Density: 5.509/km^{2} (14.27/sq mi)
- Time zone: UTC+10:00 (AEST)
- Postcode: 4570
Suburbs around Paterson
Gundiah	Gundiah	Gootchie
Munna Creek	Paterson	Gootchie
Miva	Theebine	Theebine

Paterson is a rural locality in the Fraser Coast Region, Queensland, Australia. In the 2021 census, Paterson had a population of 157 people.

== Geography ==
The locality is bounded to the north-east by Old Gympie Road, to the south-east by the North Coast railway line, to the south-west by the Mary River, and to the north-west by the Bauple - Woolooga Road.

The North Coast railway line enters the locality from the south-east (Theebine) and exits to the north-east (Gootchie). The locality is served by the Paterson railway station (25.8888°S 152.5468°E).

Gundiah State Forest is in the north of the locality. Apart from this protected area, the land use is predominantly grazing on native vegetation with some plantation forestry and some crop growing.

== History ==
The locality takes its name from its railway station which in turn was named after a local resident. Local residents began lobbying for a railway siding on Mr Paterson's property in 1890 to avoid having to travel miles to the nearest stations.

== Demographics ==
In the 2016 census, Paterson had a population of 148 people.

In the 2021 census, Paterson had a population of 157 people.

== Education ==
There are no schools in Paterson. The nearest government secondary schools are Gundiah State School in neighbouring Gundiah to the north and Theebine State School in neighbouring Theebine to the south. The nearest government secondary schools are James Nash State High School (to Year 12) in Gympie to the south-east, Kilkivan State School (to Year 10) in Kilkivan to the south-west, and Maryborough State High School (to Year 12) in Maryborough to the north-east.
