= Gootchie, Queensland =

Gootchie
- Suburb
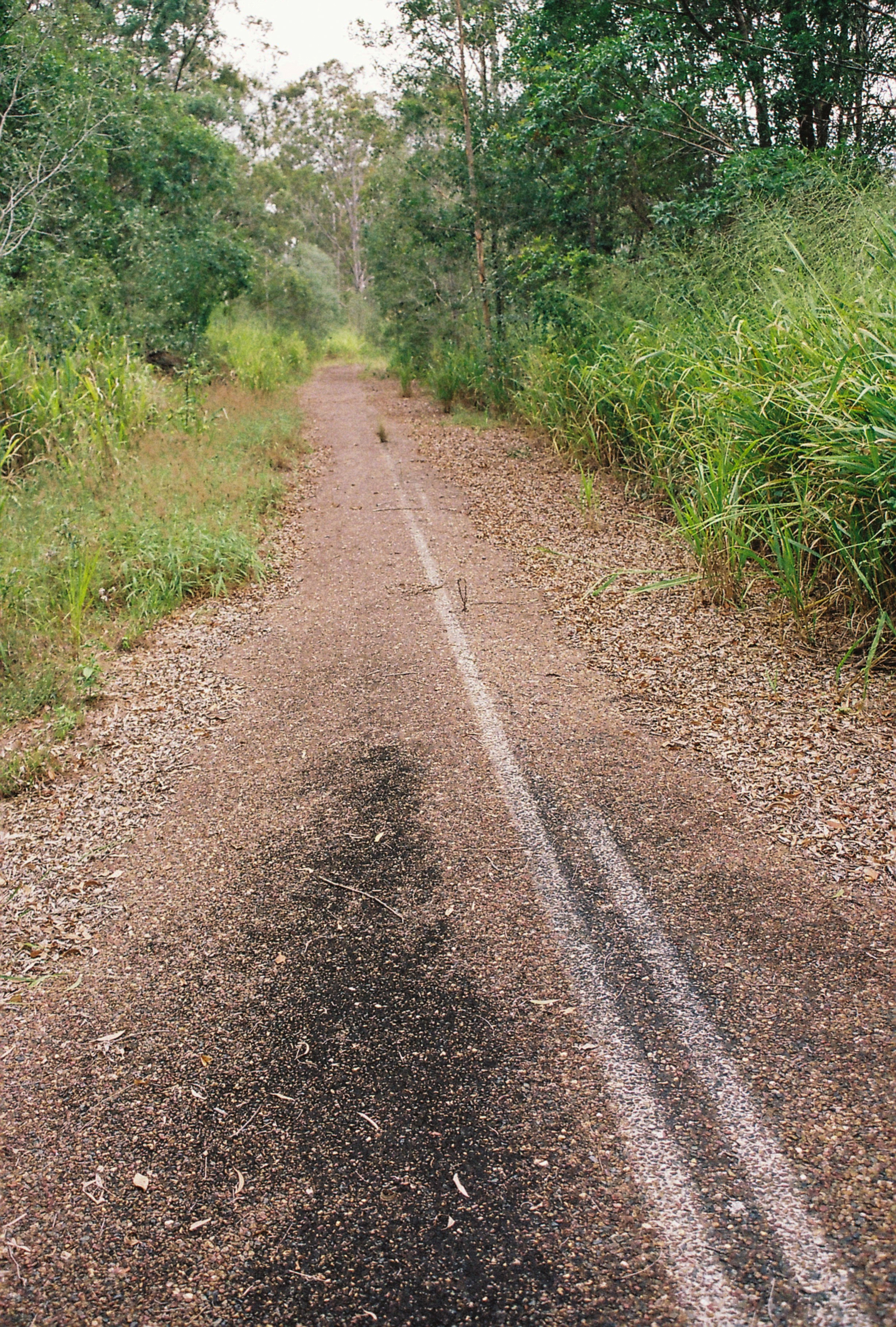
- Old Bruce Highway, Gootchie, 2013

- Interactive map of Gootchie
- Coordinates: 25.8816°S 152.5811°E
- Country: Australia
- State: Queensland
- LGA: Fraser Coast Region
- Location: 18.0 km (11.2 mi) S of Tiaro; 44.0 km (27.3 mi) SSW of Maryborough; 51.8 km (32.2 mi) N of Gympie; 226 km (140 mi) N of Brisbane

Government
  - State electorate: Gympie
  - Federal division: Wide Bay

Area
  - Total: 34.5 km^{2} (13.3 sq mi)

Population
  - Total: 96 (2021 census)
  - Density: 2.783/km^{2} (7.21/sq mi)
- Time zone: UTC+10:00 (AEST)
- Postcode: 4650
Suburbs around Gootchie
Gundiah	Gundiah	Bauple
Paterson	Gootchie	Bauple Forest
Theebine	Kanigan	Glenwood

Gootchie is a rural locality in the Fraser Coast Region, Queensland, Australia. In the 2021 census, Gootchie had a population of 96 people.

== Geography ==
The Bruce Highway enters the locality at the south-west (Kanigan / Glenwood) and forms the south-east boundary of the locality, then passes through the locality travelling north, and then forms the north-eastern boundary of the locality before exiting to the north-west (Bauple).

The Bauple Woolooga Road forms part of the northern boundary of the locality while the Old Gympie Road (the predecessor to the Bruce Highway) forms the north-western boundary of the locality.

The North Coast railway line enters the locality from the west (Paterson) and exits to the north-west (Gundiah). The locality was served by the now-abandoned Gootchie Creek railway station (25.8547°S 152.5561°E).

The land use is a mix of rural activities including grazing on native vegetation, plantation forestry, and crop growing.

== History ==
The locality name comes from a grazing property and the railway station name formerly spelt Gutchy. It is reportedly an Aboriginal word from the Kabi language, Badjala dialect, meaning sand goanna.

Gootchie Provisional School opened on 1 June 1874. It closed on 30 April 1879, but reopened on 1 May 1885. It closed again in 1894, but reopened on 2 December 1895. On 1 January 1909, it became Gootchie State School. It closed permanently in 1933.

Kannagan Provisional School opened on 6 July 1896. By 1898, the spelling of the name had changed to be Kanighan Provisional School. On 1 January 1909, it became Kanighan State School. About 1946, the spelling changed to Kanigan State School. It closed in 1959. It was on the western corner of the junction of Kanyan Road and the Bruce Highway (approx 25.9042°S 152.5981°E), now within the present-day boundaries of Gootchie.

== Demographics ==
In the 2016 census, Gootchie had a population of 96 people.

In the 2021 census, Gootchie had a population of 96 people.

== Education ==
There are no schools in Gootchie. The nearest government primary schools are:

- Gundiah State School in neighbouring Gundiah to the north-west
- Bauple State School in neighbouring Bauple to the north-east
- Glenwood State School in neighbouring Glenwood to the south-east
- Theebine State School in neighbouring Theebine to the south-west

The nearest government secondary schools are:

- Maryborough State High School in Maryborough to the north
- James Nash State High School in Gympie to the south
