= Gunalda =

- Town
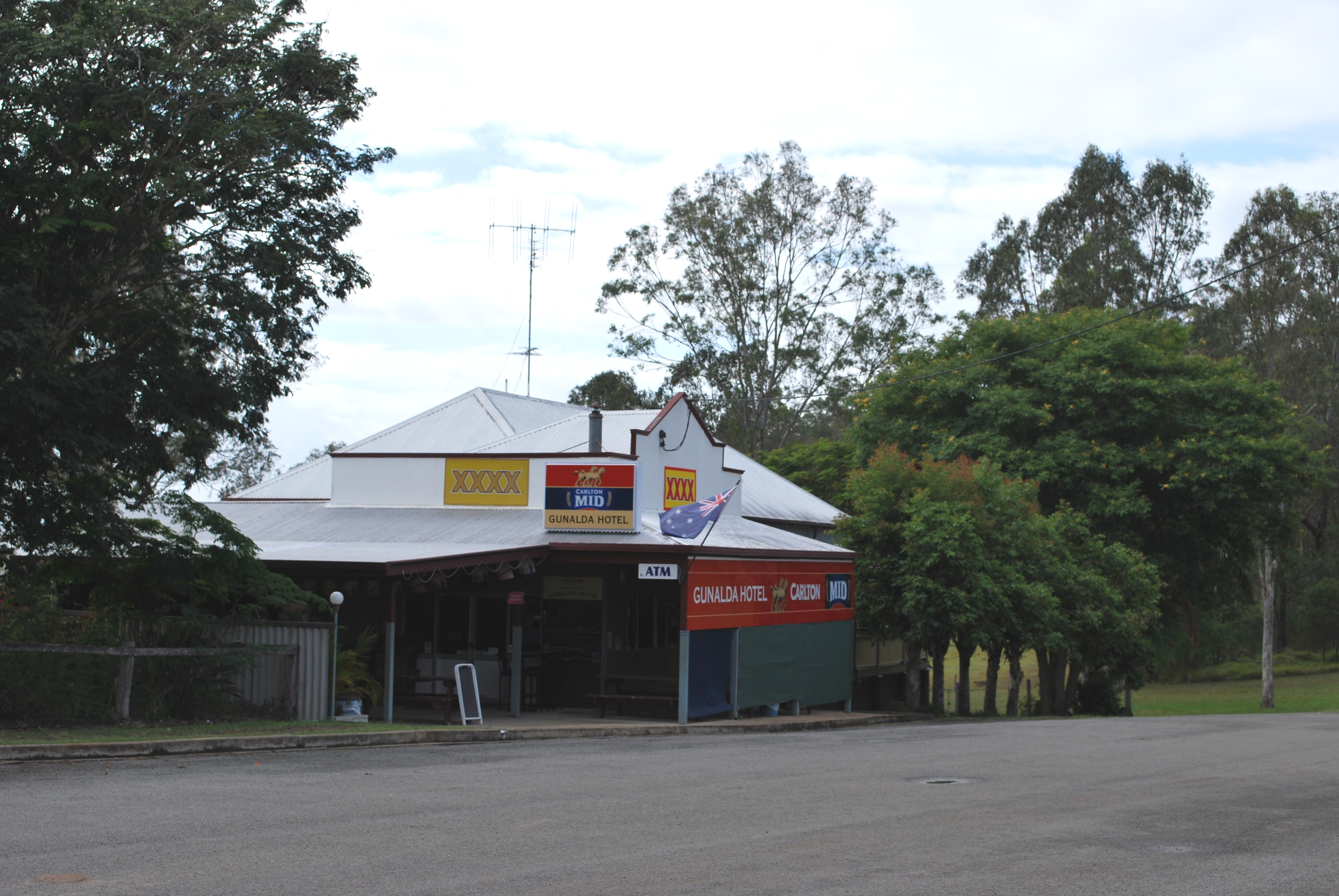
- Gunalda Hotel

- Interactive map of Gunalda
- Coordinates: 25.9944°S 152.5613°E
- Country: Australia
- State: Queensland
- LGAs: Gympie Region; Fraser Coast Region
- Location: 27.3 km (17.0 mi) NW of Gympie; 194 km (121 mi) NNW of Brisbane

Government
  - State electorate: Gympie
  - Federal division: Wide Bay

Area
  - Total: 67.3 km^{2} (26.0 sq mi)

Population
  - Total: 426 (2021 census)
  - Density: 6.330/km^{2} (16.394/sq mi)
- Time zone: UTC+10:00 (AEST)
- Postcode: 4570
Localities around Gunalda
Theebine	Kanigan	Glenwood; Neerdie
Scotchy Pocket	Gunalda	Anderleigh
Curra	Curra	Anderleigh

Gunalda is a rural town in the Gympie Region and a locality split between Gympie Region and Fraser Coast Region in Queensland, Australia. In the 2021 census, the locality of Gunalda had a population of 426 people.

== Geography ==
The town is 196 kilometres (122 mi) from the state capital, Brisbane.

The Bruce Highway runs through from south-west to north.

The North Coast railway line enters the locality from the south-west (Curra) and passes to the west of the town and exists to the north-west (Theebine). Previously the railway line passed through the town, which was served by the now-dismantled Gunalda railway station (25.9943°S 152.5620°E).

== History ==
Thompson's Flat Provisional School opened on 8 August 1881. In 1889, the school was renamed Gunalda Provisional School. On 1 January 1909, it became Gunalda State School.

Eaton Post Office opened on 1 September 1882 and was renamed Gunalda in 1883.

The town was originally called Keelar but after the railway station was named Gunalda on 2 November 1923, the town was renamed Gunalda.

In December 1938, the foundation stone was laid for a Catholic church. On Sunday 8 October 1939, Archbishop James Duhig officially opened and dedicated the Catholic Church of the Little Flower.

In 1947, Christ Church Anglican was relocated from Munna Creek to 11 King Street (25.9934°S 152.5613°E) in Gunalda where it retained the name Christ Church Anglican.

== Demographics ==
In the 2006 census, the locality of Gunalda and the surrounding area had a population of 574 people.

In the 2016 census, the locality of Gunalda had a population of 392 people.

In the 2021 census, the locality of Gunalda had a population of 426 people.

== Education ==
Gunalda State School is a government primary (Prep-6) school for boys and girls on King Street (25.9927°S 152.5604°E). In 2018, the school had an enrolment of 35 students with 3 teachers (2 full-time equivalent) and 5 non-teaching staff (3 full-time equivalent).

There are no secondary schools in Gunalda. The nearest government secondary school is James Nash State High School in Gympie to the south-east.

== Facilities ==
Gunalda Cemetery is on the western end of Cotter Drive (25.9875°S 152.5553°E).
