= Gundiah =

- Town
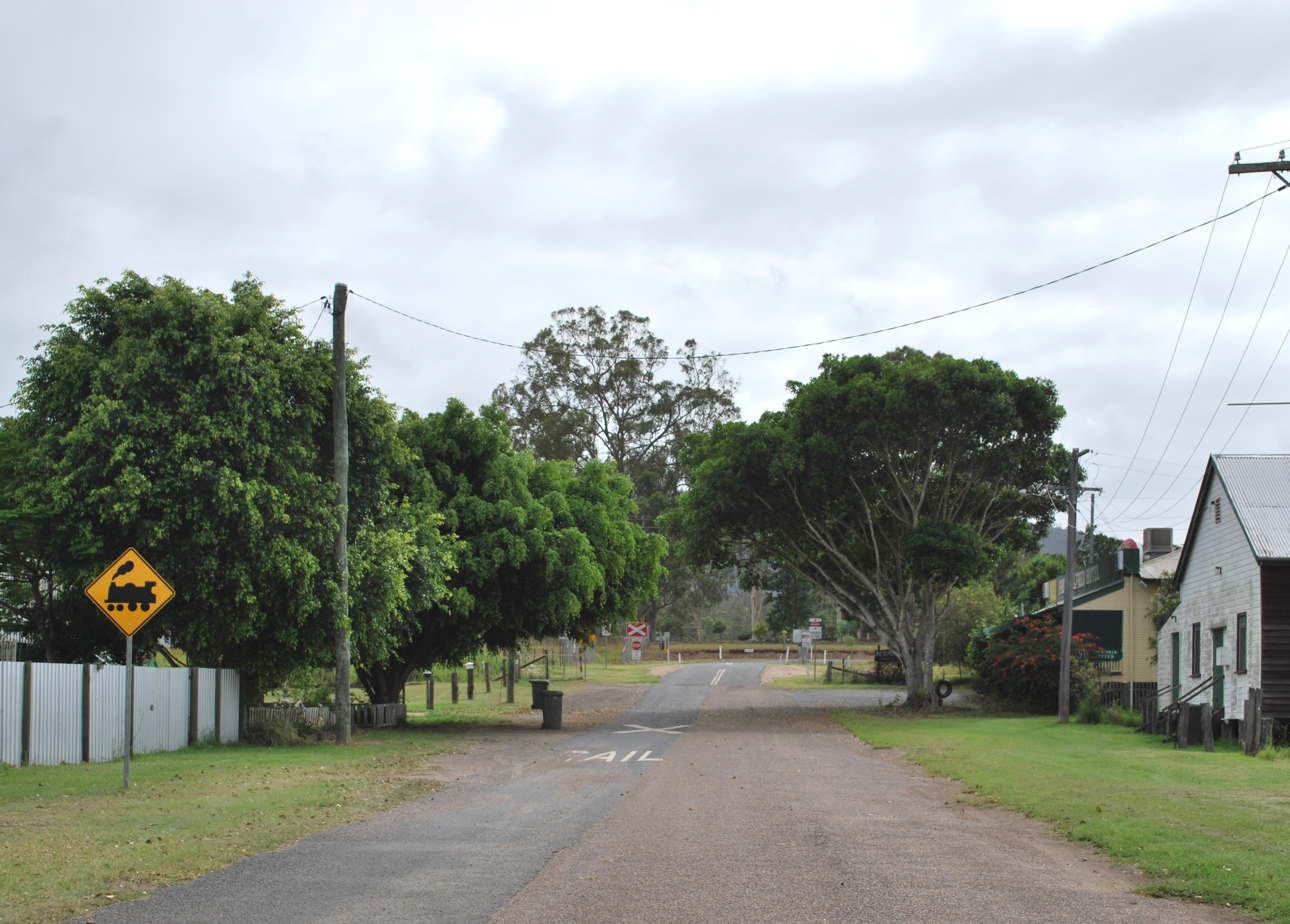
- Main Street- looking towards the railway line. The Prince Alfred Hotel can be seen in the upper right.

- Interactive map of Gundiah
- Coordinates: 25.8389°S 152.5446°E
- Country: Australia
- State: Queensland
- LGA: Fraser Coast Region
- Location: 39.8 km (24.7 mi) SW of Maryborough; 49.6 km (30.8 mi) N of Gympie; 215 km (134 mi) N of Brisbane

Government
  - State electorate: Gympie
  - Federal division: Wide Bay

Area
  - Total: 55.5 km^{2} (21.4 sq mi)

Population
  - Total: 89 (2021 census)
  - Density: 1.604/km^{2} (4.153/sq mi)
- Time zone: UTC+10:00 (AEST)
- Postcode: 4650
Localities around Gundiah
Netherby	Netherby	Netherby
Mount Urah	Gundiah	Bauple
Munna Creek	Paterson	Gootchie

Gundiah is a rural town and locality in the Fraser Coast Region, Queensland, Australia. In the 2021 census, the locality of Gundiah had a population of 89 people.

== Geography ==
Gundiah is 215 kilometres (134 mi) by road north of the state capital, Brisbane.

The Mary River forms the western boundary. Pine Mountain rises to 123 metres (404 ft) above sea level in the west of the locality (25.8383°S 152.4950°E).

The North Coast railway line enters the locality from the south-east (Gootchie), passes through the town and exits to the north (Netherby). The town is served by Gundiah railway station (25.8326°S 152.5431°E).

The land use is predominantly grazing on native vegetation with some irrigated crop-growing and plantation forestry.

== History ==
The area was initially known as "Gootchie". The name ''Gundiah'' is a Kabi language word meaning ''goodbye''.

The main building in the town is the pub, the Prince Alfred Hotel. The original Prince Alfred Hotel was built in 1868 but was destroyed by fire. The existing pub was built in 1947.

Gootchie Post Office opened on 1 July 1869, was renamed Gundiah in 1882 and closed in 1978.

Gundiah Provisional School opened on 18 January 1886 but closed in 1895. It reopened in 1898 and became Gundiah State School on 1 January 1909.

Gundiah Memorial Hall opened in 1922.

== Demographics ==
In the 2006 census, the locality of Gundiah had a population of 384 people.

In the 2016 census, the locality of Gundiah had a population of 123 people.

In the 2021 census, the locality of Gundiah had a population of 89 people.

== Economy ==
There are a number of homesteads in the locality:

- Banksia Ridge (25.8376°S 152.4918°E)
- Evergreen (25.8168°S 152.4883°E)
- Glencobie (25.8788°S 152.4866°E)
- High View (25.8582°S 152.4898°E)
- Ledsforth (25.8436°S 152.4900°E)

== Education ==
Gundiah State School is a government primary (Prep–6) school for boys and girls at 23 Gundiah School Road (25.8424°S 152.5464°E). In 2017, the school had an enrolment of 24 students with 3 teachers (2 full-time equivalent) and 6 non-teaching staff (2 full-time equivalent). In 2018, the school had an enrolment of 28 students with 3 teachers (2 full-time equivalent) and 6 non-teaching staff (3 full-time equivalent).

There is no secondary school in Gundiah. The nearest government secondary schools are Maryborough State High School in Maryborough to the north-east and James Nash State High School in Gympie to the south.
