= Miva, Queensland =

Miva
- Town
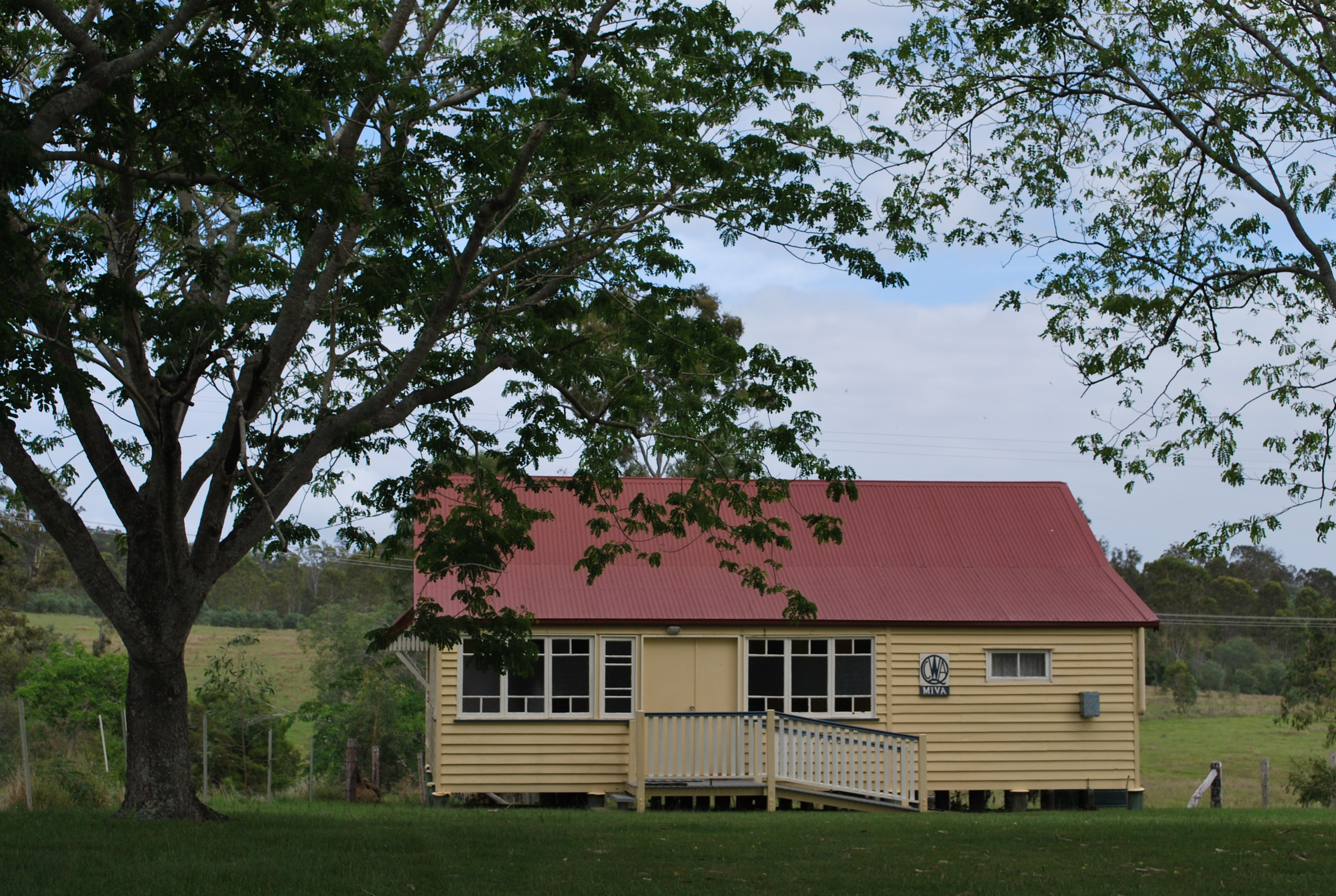
- Country Women's Association rooms

- Interactive map of Miva
- Coordinates: 25.9578°S 152.4922°E
- Country: Australia
- State: Queensland
- LGAs: Gympie Region; Fraser Coast Region
- Location: 42.0 km (26.1 mi) NE of Kilkivan; 43.6 km (27.1 mi) NW of Gympie; 210 km (130 mi) NNW of Brisbane

Government
  - State electorate: Gympie
  - Federal division: Wide Bay

Area
  - Total: 68.4 km^{2} (26.4 sq mi)

Population
  - Total: 55 (2021 census)
  - Density: 0.804/km^{2} (2.083/sq mi)
- Time zone: UTC+10:00 (AEST)
- Postcode: 4570
Localities around Miva
Munna Creek	Munna Creek	Paterson
Glen Echo	Miva	Theebine
Woolooga	Sexton	Scotchy Pocket

Miva is a rural locality split between the Gympie Region and the Fraser Coast Region in Queensland, Australia. In the 2021 census, the locality of Miva had a population of 55 people.

== Geography ==
Miva's eastern boundary is the Mary River. Its western boundary is the Bauple-Woolooga Road. Miva is almost entirely within the Gympie Region apart from a small section in the north-east of the locality which is part of the Fraser Coast Region. The lower parts of the locality near the river and along the valleys (elevation 20–70 metres are used for farming). The hilly land to the west rises to peaks of 100 metres and the hilly land to the south-east rises to a peak of 150 metres; the hilly land is undeveloped bushland.

The former Kingaroy branch railway passed through Miva from the east to the south-west; Miva was served by the now-abandoned Miva railway station (25.9584°S 152.4917°E).

== History ==
The name Miva is taken from the name of a pastoral run belonging to Gideon Scott, a pastoralist in March 1851. It is thought to be an Aboriginal word indicating either stony knob or Moreton Bay chestnut.

In 1870, a punt began to operate a river crossing service at Miva.

The Nanango railway line opened in December 1886 as far as Kilkivan.

Munna Creek Cemetery (also known as Miva Cemetery) opened circa 1905-6 on a 3-acre (1.2 ha) site.

Miva Provisional School opened about 1888, becoming Miva State School on 1 January 1909. In March 1922, it became a half-time provisional school, sharing its teacher with the Sexton State School, who taught at each school in alternating weeks. The two schools were closed in September 1924. It reopened in 1926 as a provisional school, but closed finally about 1934. It was on Munna Miva Road beside the Mary River (25.95140°S 152.49366°E).

Dickabram Cemetery opened in 1909 on a 1-acre (0.40 ha) site.

Miva Post Office opened by May 1908 (a receiving office had been open from 1888) and closed in 1976.

== Demographics ==
In the 2016 census, the locality of Miva had a population of 57 people.

In the 2021 census, the locality of Miva had a population of 55 people.

== Heritage listings ==
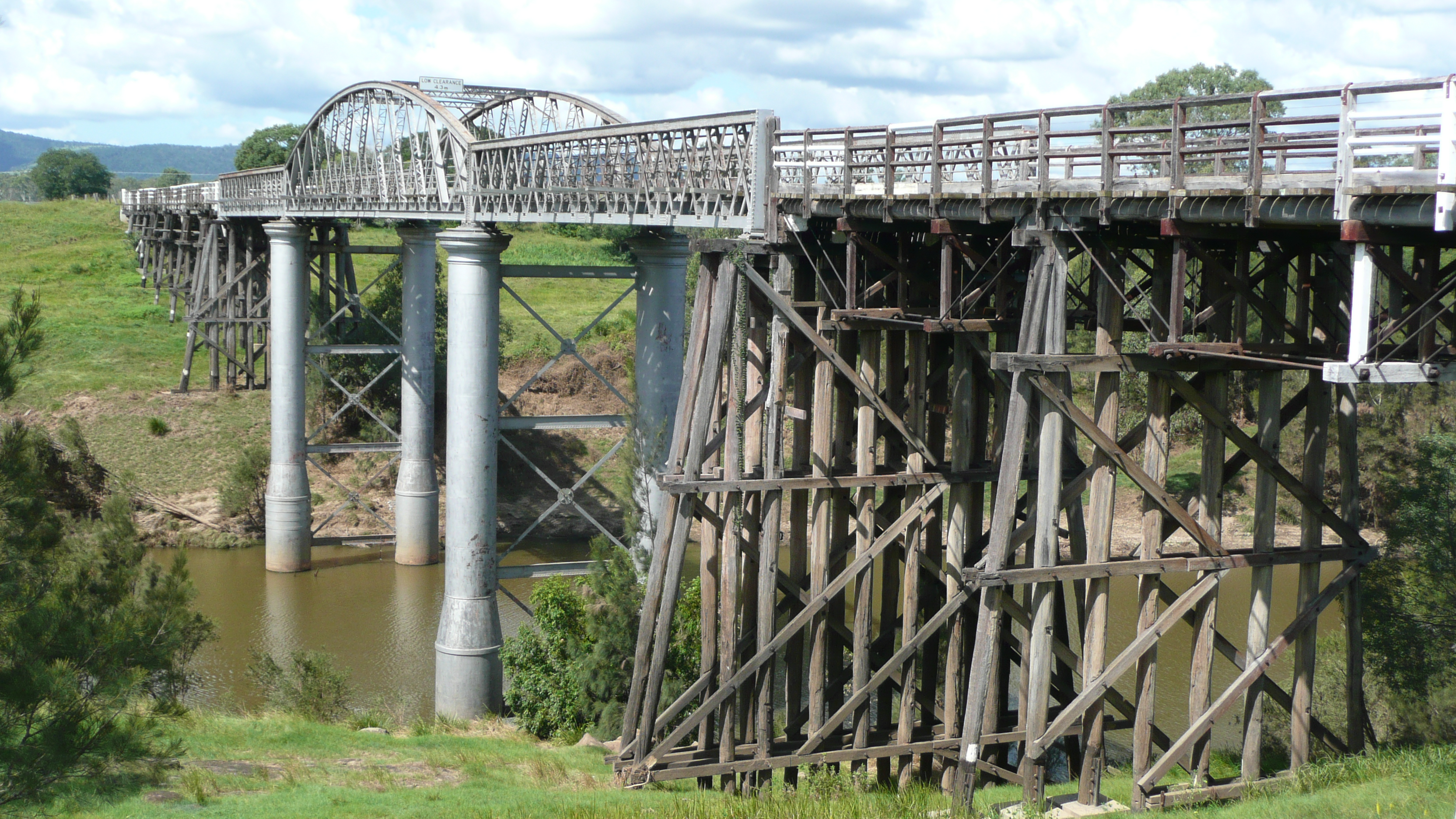
Dickabram Bridge

Miva has a number of heritage-listed sites, including:

- Dickabram Bridge, across the Mary River (25.9540°S 152.4954°E)

== Education ==
There are no schools in Miva. The nearest government primary schools are Theebine State School in neighbouring Theebine to the east, Gundiah State School in Gundiah to the north-east, and Woolooga State School in neighbouring Woolooga to the south-west. The nearest government secondary schools are Kilkivan State School (to Year 10) in Kilkivan to the south-west and James Nash State High School (to Year 12) in Gympie to the south-east. There are also non-government schools in Gympie and its suburbs.

== Amenities ==
The Miva branch of the Queensland Country Women's Association meets at the QCWA Miva Rooms at 1186 Miva Road.

== Facilities ==
Dickabram Cemetery is at 1242 Miva Road (25.9604°S 152.4848°E). It is operated by the Dickabram Cemetery Trust and provides options including monumental and lawn graves, the interment of ashes and a columbarium wall.

Despite its name, Munna Creek Cemetery is 1437 Bauple Woolooga Road in Miva (25.8943°S 152.4805°E). It is operated by the Fraser Coast Regional Council and provides options for monumental graves and a columbarium wall in a quiet bushland setting.
