= Theebine railway station =

Former railway station in Queensland, Australia

Theebine

General information
- Location: Theebine Road, Theebine
- Coordinates: 25°56′49″S 152°32′41″E
- Line: North Coast Line
- Connections: no connections

History
- Closed: Yes
- Former names: Kilkivan Junction

Services
Preceding station	Queensland Rail	Following station
Curra towards Brisbane	North Coast line	Gundiah towards Cairns
Station is 201.06 km (124.93 mi) from Central
Location

Theebine railway station (formerly Kilkivan Junction) is a closed railway station on the North Coast railway line of Queensland, Australia at Theebine. Slightly south of the railway station is the junction between the main North Coast line and the Kingaroy branch, which continues into west Queensland. It is also the junction for the Dickabram line.

== History ==
Formerly Kilkivan Junction, it was named by the Railways Department as Theebine on 23 May 1910, using a Waka language word, dhil-bvain indicating the lung fish, Ceratodus Forsteri.

The Kingaroy to Theebine railway, opened in December 1904, was used for agriculture and commercial freight as well as transporting passengers and was one of the first branch lines built in Queensland. The Theebine to Kingaroy line was officially closed in early 2010.
