= Theebine =

- Town
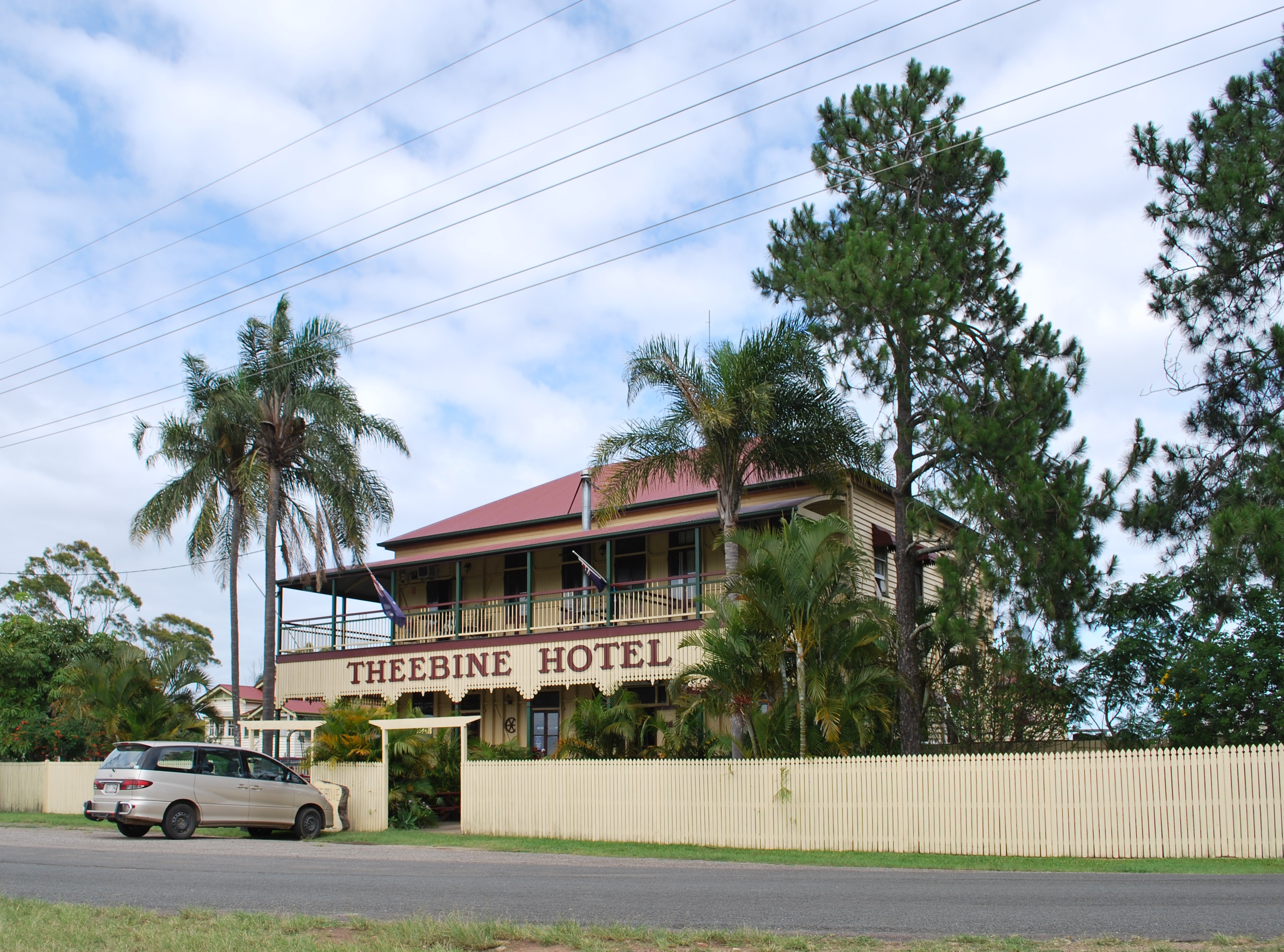
- Theebine Hotel

- Interactive map of Theebine
- Coordinates: 25.9461°S 152.5438°E
- Country: Australia
- State: Queensland
- LGAs: Gympie Region; Fraser Coast Region
- Location: 35.9 km (22.3 mi) N of Gympie; 54.9 km (34.1 mi) SSW of Maryborough; 88.0 km (54.7 mi) SW of Hervey Bay; 215 km (134 mi) N of Brisbane

Government
  - State electorate: Gympie
  - Federal division: Wide Bay

Area
  - Total: 44.1 km^{2} (17.0 sq mi)

Population
  - Total: 145 (2021 census)
  - Density: 3.288/km^{2} (8.52/sq mi)
- Time zone: UTC+10:00 (AEST)
- Postcode: 4570
Localities around Theebine
Miva	Paterson	Gootchie
Miva	Theebine	Kanigan
Miva	Scotchy Pocket	Gunalda

Theebine is a rural town and locality split between the Gympie Region and the Fraser Coast Region, both in Queensland, Australia.

In the 2021 census, the locality of Theebine had a population of 145 people.

== Geography ==
The town is located 215 kilometres (134 mi) north of the Queensland's capital city, Brisbane. 40.0 square kilometres (15.4 sq mi) of the locality and the town is within Gympie Region with only 4.1 square kilometres (1.6 sq mi) in the north-east in the Fraser Coast Region.

The western boundary of the locality is the Mary River.

The North Coast railway line passes through the locality from south to north with the Theebine railway station (25.9474°S 152.5445°E), serving the town. The former Kingaroy railway line (later the Nanango railway line) branched at Theebine with the Dickabram railway station (25.9537°S 152.5008°E) located in Theebine just before the Dickabram Bridge over the Mary River.

Kanyan is a neighbourhood in the north-east of the locality (25.9333°S 152.55°E) and takes its name from the former Kanyan railway station. Kanyan is derived from the Kabi language word kanigan meaning daughter.

== History ==
The town was originally established to service the railway junction where the Kingaroy line branched from the North Coast railway line. The Kingaroy to Theebine railway, opened in December 1904, was used for agriculture and commercial freight as well as transporting passengers and was one of the first branch lines built in Queensland. Formerly Kilkivan Junction, it was re-named by the Railways Department as Theebine on 23 May 1910, using a Waka language word, dhil-bvain indicating the lung fish, Ceratodus Forsteri.

The Theebine Hotel was first built in 1909 and was known as the Kilkivan Junction Hotel.

The Kilkivan Junction Provisional School opened in 1889 and became Kilkivan Junction State School on 1 January 1909. In 1910, it was renamed Theebine State School.

A stump-capping ceremony was held for the United Presbyterian and Methodist Church on Saturday 3 February 1940. The church was officially opened on Saturday 4 May 1940. The building was 40 by 24 feet (12.2 by 7.3 m) with a weatherboard exterior and with an interior lined with pine. It could seat 112 people. The church was also available for Anglican Church services. In 1977 with the amalgamation that created the Uniting Church in Australia, it became the Theebine Uniting Church. In 2000, it became the Theebine Community Church.

Theebine Masonic Lodge opened in 1948.

The Theebine to Kingaroy line was officially closed in early 2010.

== Demographics ==
In the 2011 census, the locality of Theebine had a population of 182 people.

In the 2016 census, the locality of Theebine had a population of 104 people.

In the 2021 census, the locality of Theebine had a population of 145 people.

== Heritage listings ==
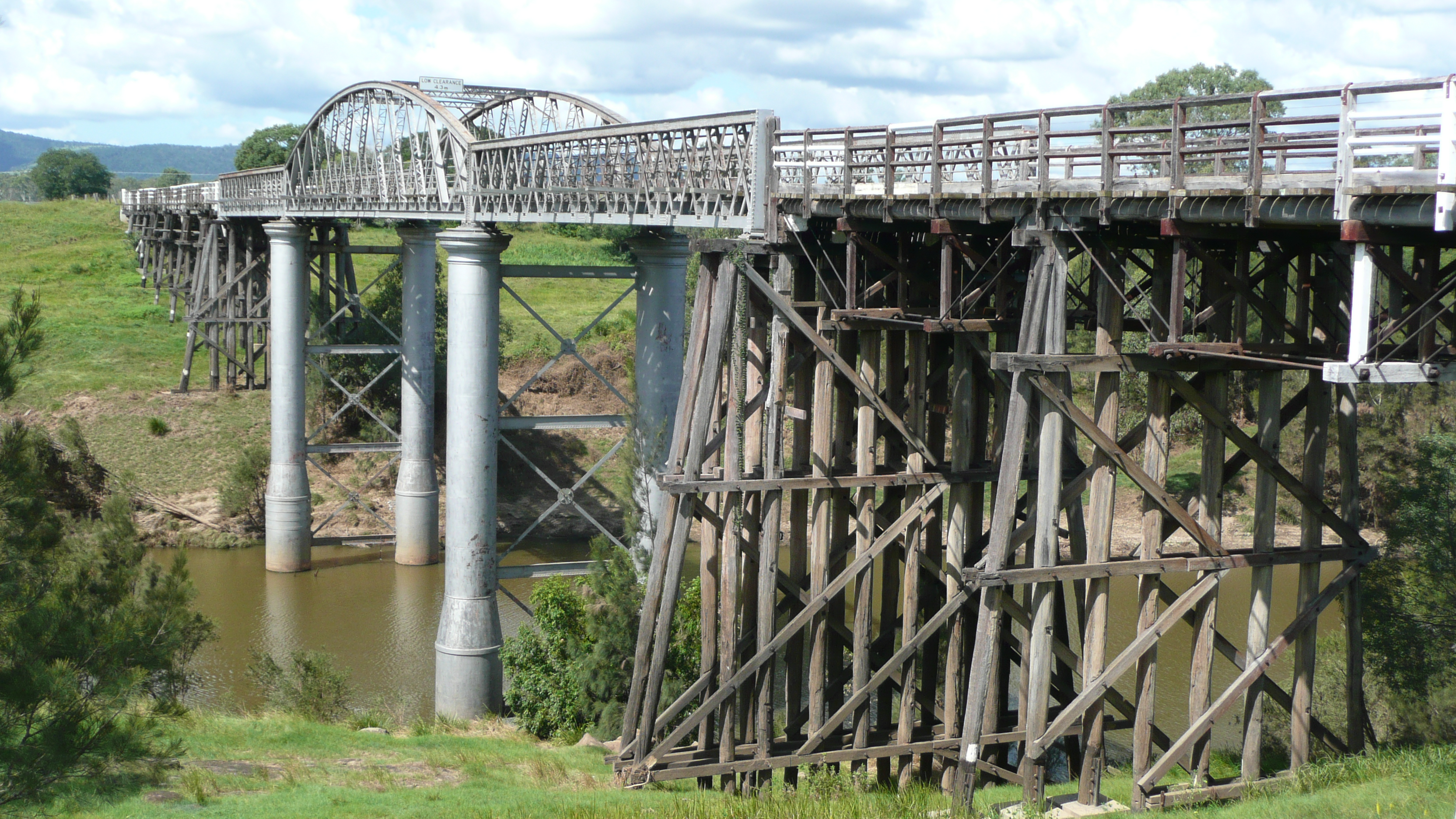
Dickabram Bridge, 2010

Theebine has a number of heritage-listed sites, including:

- Dickabram Bridge, across the Mary River (25.9540°S 152.4954°E)

== Education ==
Theebine State School is a government primary (Prep–6) school for boys and girls at Scrub Road (25.9525°S 152.5409°E). In 2015, it had an enrolment of 5 students with 1 teacher and 2 non-teaching staff (1 equivalent full-time). In 2018, the school had an enrolment of 12 students with 2 teachers (1 full-time equivalent) and 4 non-teaching staff (2 full-time equivalent).

There are no secondary schools in Theebine. The nearest government secondary school is James Nash State High School in Gympie to the south.

== Amenities ==
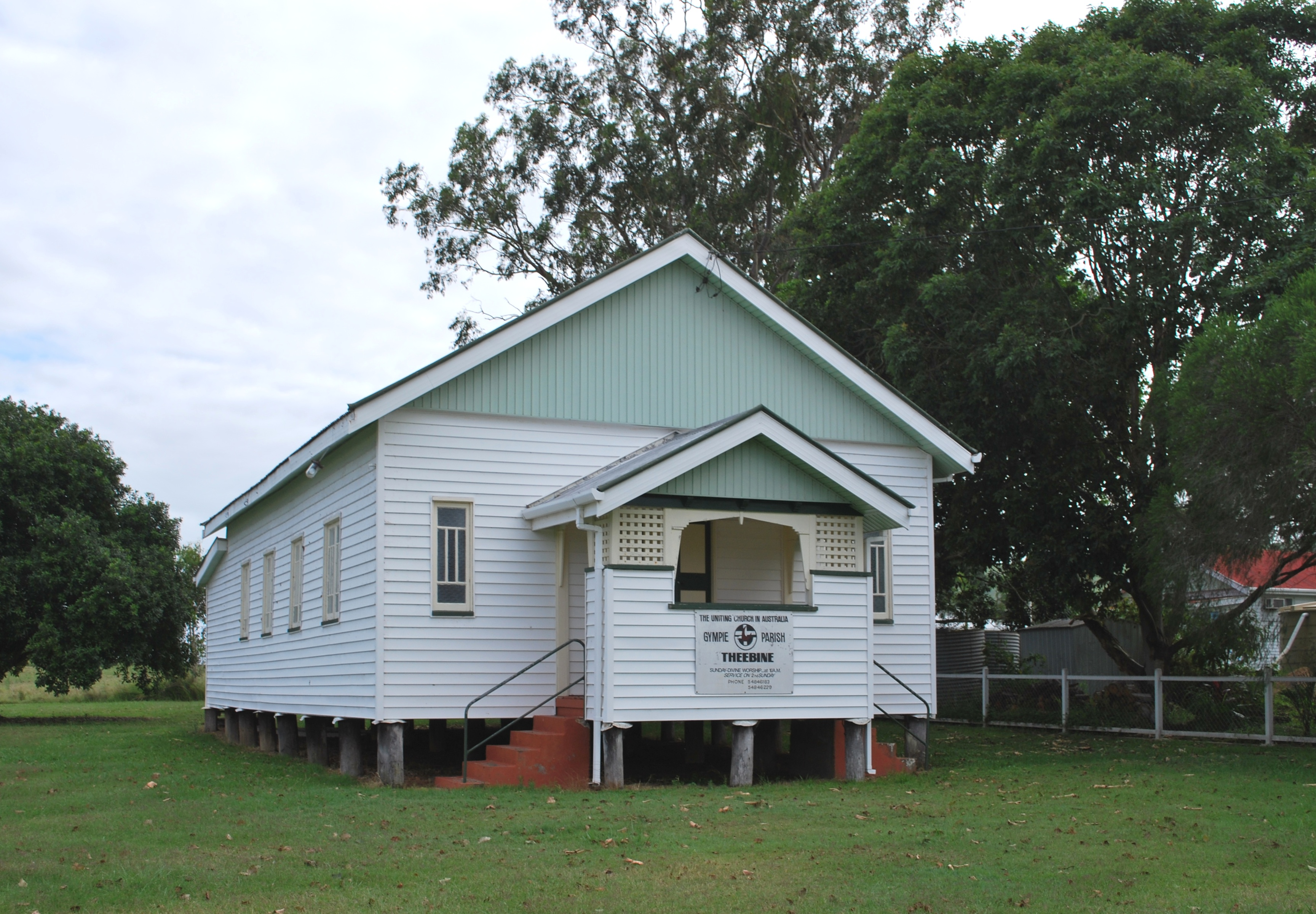
Theebine Uniting Church, 2010

Theebine Community Church is at 4 Old Cleveland Road (25.945683°S 152.5434°E).

Theebine Community Hall is adjacent to the church at 6 Old Cleveland Road (25.9455°S 152.5434°E).

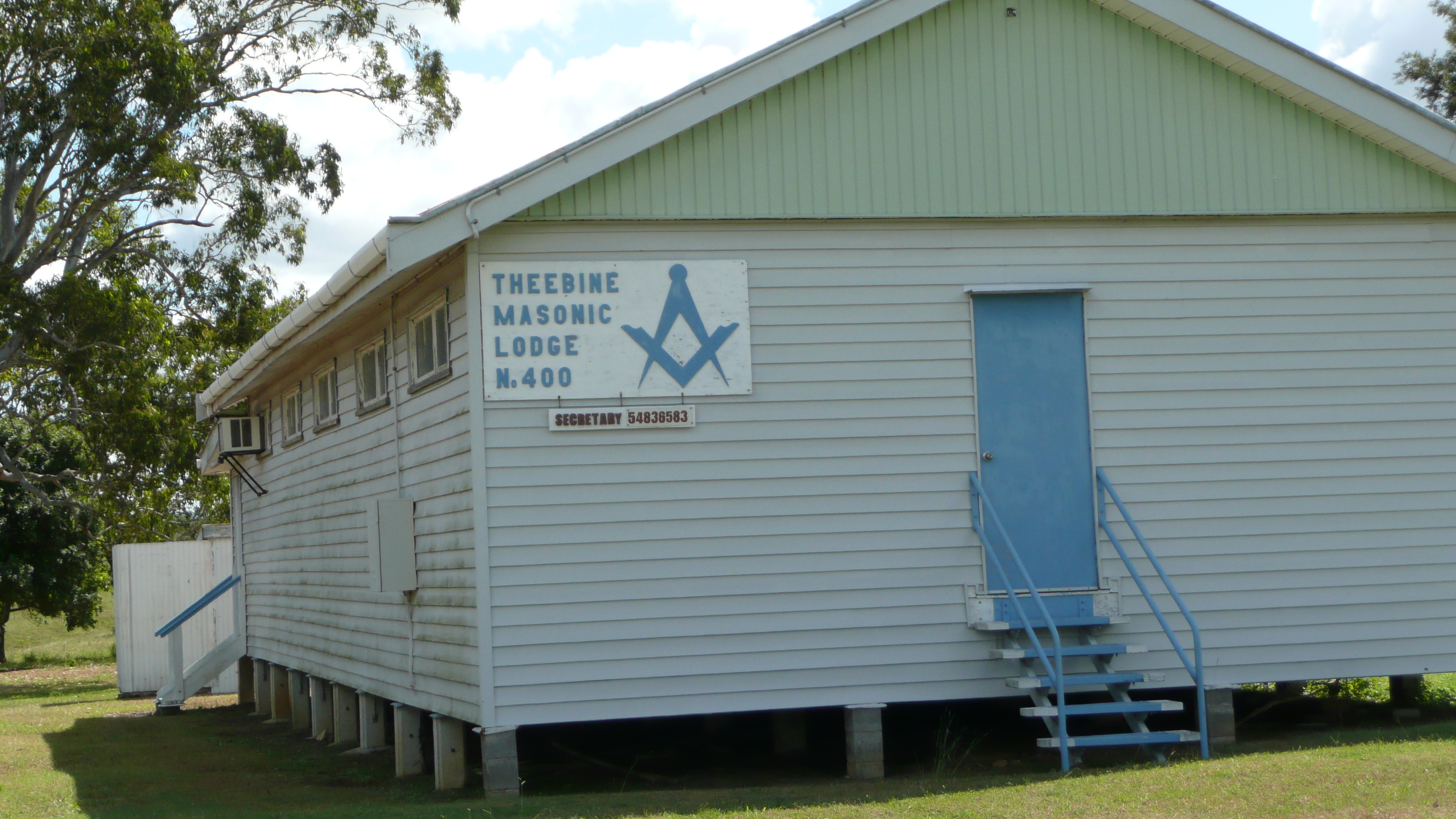
Theebine Masonic Lodge, 2010

Theebine Masonic Lodge is at 17–19 Theebine Road (25.9455°S 152.5441°E).

== Attractions ==
The town is best known for the restored Theebine Hotel, a tourist attraction, at 11 Theebine Road (25.9463°S 152.5441°E).

== See also ==
- Theebine railway station, Queensland
