= Dickabram Bridge =

Heritage listed road and rail bridge in Queensland, Australia

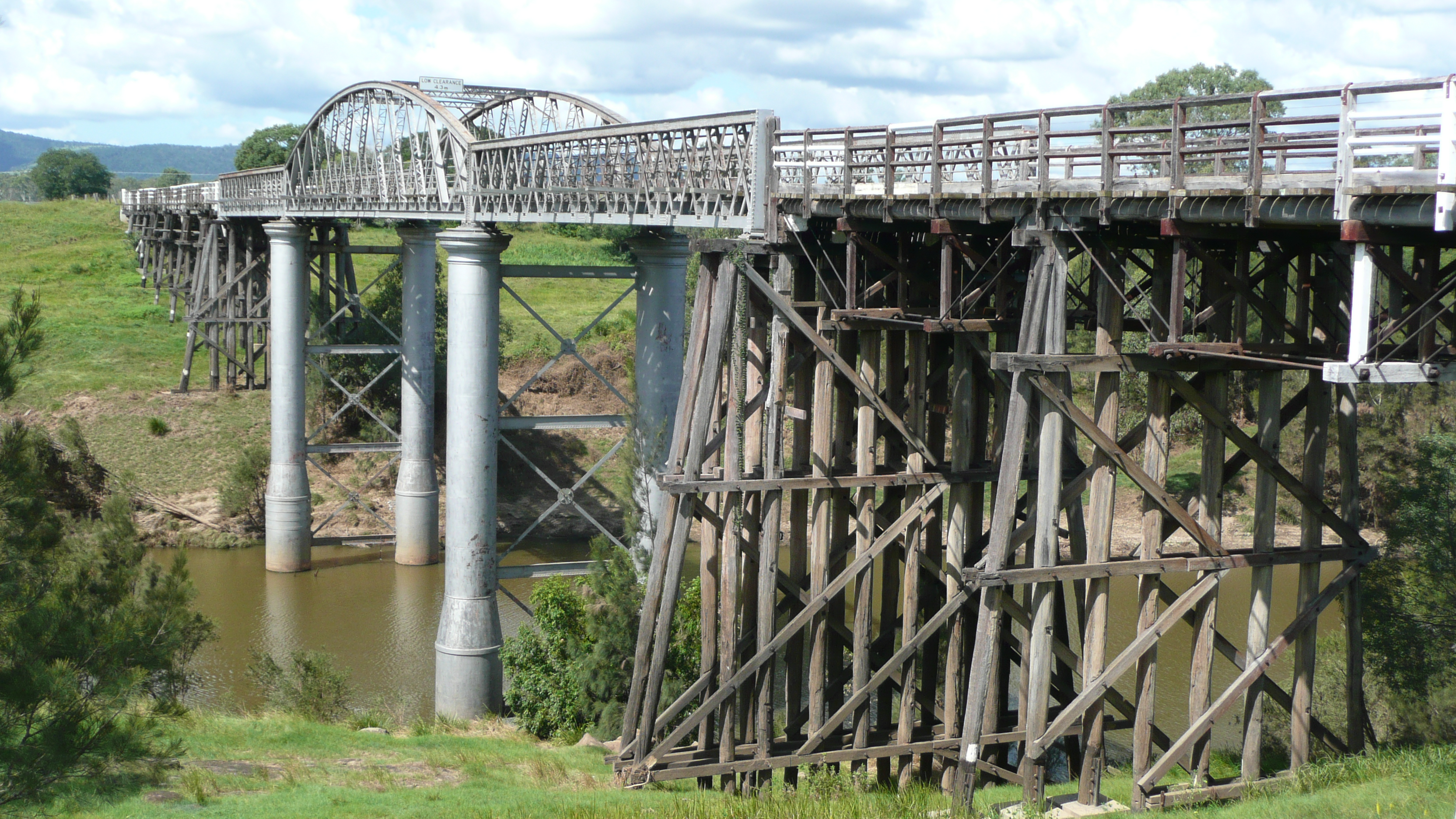
- Dickabram Bridge over the Mary River
- Coordinates: 25.9540°S 152.4954°E
- Carries: Motor vehicles, Railway
- Crosses: Mary River
- Locale: Miva, Queensland
- Heritage status: Registered (ID 15956)

Characteristics
- Design: Truss bridge
- Material: Timber, Steel
- Height: 3.5 metres (11 ft) maximum vehicle height
- Longest span: 36.6 metres (120 ft)
- No. of spans: 14 (6.1m, 7.9m, three at 11m, 11.6m, 24.1m, 36.6m, 24.1m, 11.6m, two at 11m, 7.9m and 6.1m)
- Clearance above: 4.3 metres (14 ft)
- Clearance below: 23 metres (75 ft)

History
- Designer: Henry Charles Stanley
- Constructed by: McDermott Owen & Co.
- Construction start: 1885
- Construction end: 6 December 1886

Location
- Interactive map of Dickabram Bridge

Dickabram Bridge
- Location within Queensland
- 25.9538°S 152.4956°E
- Location: across the Mary River, between Miva and Theebine, Gympie Region, Queensland, Australia

History
- Design period: 1870s–1890s (late 19th century)
- Built: 1885–1886

Site notes
- Architect: Henry Charles Stanley

Queensland Heritage Register
- Official name: Dickabram Bridge, Mary River Bridge (Miva)
- Type: state heritage (built)
- Designated: 21 October 1992
- Reference no.: 600836
- Significant period: 1880s (fabric)
- Significant components: pier/s (bridge)
- Builders: Owen McDermott & Co.

Dickabram Bridge is a heritage-listed road-and-rail bridge over the Mary River between Miva and Theebine, both in the Gympie Region, Queensland, Australia. It was the major bridge on the Kingaroy railway line. It was designed by Henry Charles Stanley and built from 1885 to 1886 by Messrs Michael McDermott, Owens & Co. It is also known as Mary River Bridge (Miva). The bridge was registered on the former Register of the National Estate in 1988.

The bridge is the only remaining road-and-rail bridge in South East Queensland. Others in Australia include the Sydney Harbour Bridge (1932), Bridgewater Bridge (River Derwent near Hobart ) (1943) and the Burdekin Bridge (Burdekin River near Home Hill ) (1957). It is also the oldest remaining large steel truss bridge constructed in Queensland.

== History ==
The Dickabram Bridge over the Mary River was the major bridge on the Kingaroy branch railway line. The contract for construction of the line to Kilkivan was awarded to McDermott, Owens & Company on 8 August 1884, the contract to be completed by the 1st June 1886. This contract Included several other bridges, drainage structures, formation & track consisting of a total length of railway of 26 miles (42 km) 35 chains (700 m) and 2 links. Work was delayed in 1885 awaiting casting of the cylindrical piers for the central spans. During construction it was known as the Kilkivan railway bridge, and at least one worker died, as well as two children of workers drowning. The bridge was tested in November 1886 with a two-engine train. The line opened for traffic between Dickabram and Kilkivan on 6 December 1886.

The original road bridge across the Mary River at Miva had opened on 30 October 1878. This bridge was damaged by floods in July 1879 and swept away by floods in February 1880. A replacement road bridge was swept away by floods in October 1882. Prior to these bridges a punt had operated at the crossing.

It was provided in December 1882 that the proposed rail bridge be built to carry road traffic as well. Because of the delay in opening access roads it was March 1889 before it opened to road traffic.

The steel and timber truss bridge, built by McDermott, Owens & Co., was completed in November 1886 and the line opened for traffic between Dickabram and Kilkivan on 6 December 1886.

The name of the bridge comes from a local Aboriginal word dickabram meaning sweet potato that grew along the river flats there. The bridge decking was submerged under water only once during the 1893 floods.

The bridge has remained in use without substantial modification. Work since its completion includes undertrussing a 36-foot (11 m) span in 1911, strengthening the 26-and-36-foot (7.9 and 11.0 m) spans for C17 locomotives in 1935, a concrete base for pier 9 in 1968, and scour protection in 1976. Work strengthening the line from PB15 to C17 standard was completed between 1933 and 1935. Diesel electric locomotives were first permitted in 1977. The decking has been modified by adding a kerb in the 1970s–80s to separate road and rail traffic to save the need for a gatekeeper to control road traffic.

The extensive restoration of the bridge, involving replacement of hardwood timber beams and decking, was completed in April 2009.

Rehabilitation works were carried out in 2017–2019 by the Department of Transport and Main Roads. This involved replacing some of the aged timber girders, decking, piles and other structural elements and re-painting the steel elements with a coating applied to protect the structure from further corrosion. In 2018 the smaller and less complex pier 8 was rehabilitated. The project team identified issues and mitigation measures required before dismantling and in January 2019 starting work on the larger pier 11.

A plaque was erected on 12 October 1986, as an Australian Bicentenary Project to commemorate the historical significance and the centenary of the Dickabram Bridge.

The Kingaroy to Theebine railway was used for agriculture and commercial freight as well as transporting passengers and was one of the first branch lines built in Queensland. The Theebine to Kingaroy line was officially closed in early 2010.

== Description ==
The Dickabram Bridge over the Mary River is 191 metres (627 ft) long and stands 23 metres (75 ft) above the Mary River. All spans are metal trusses except for the 11-metre (36 ft) approach spans which are tied timber girders. The two river piers are cast iron cylinders; the remaining piers and road deck are timber. It comprises two 80-foot (24 m) parallel chord lattice girder spans either side of a 120-foot (37 m) hogback lattice girder span, having steel cross girders, supported on two cylinder piers and two double timber piers.

== Heritage listing ==
Dickabram Bridge was listed on the Queensland Heritage Register on 21 October 1992 having satisfied the following criteria.

The place is important in demonstrating the evolution or pattern of Queensland's history.

The bridge is a late 19th-century and essentially unmodified high level road-rail bridge with half-through double by 2 lattice girder approach spans and hogback through double x 2 lattice girder main spans. It was constructed on the site of several low-level bridges that had been destroyed by floods.

The place demonstrates rare, uncommon or endangered aspects of Queensland's cultural heritage.

It is one of the few extant road-rail bridges in Queensland.

The place is important in demonstrating a high degree of creative or technical achievement at a particular period.

It is the oldest extant of its type in Queensland with the longest hogback span of its type in Queensland.

The place has a special association with the life or work of a particular person, group or organisation of importance in Queensland's history.

Its design was associated with the Chief Engineer, Henry C. Stanley.
