= Mary River (Queensland) =

River in Queensland, Australia

Mary Moocooboola, Moonaboola, Numbulla, Booie, Wide Bay River
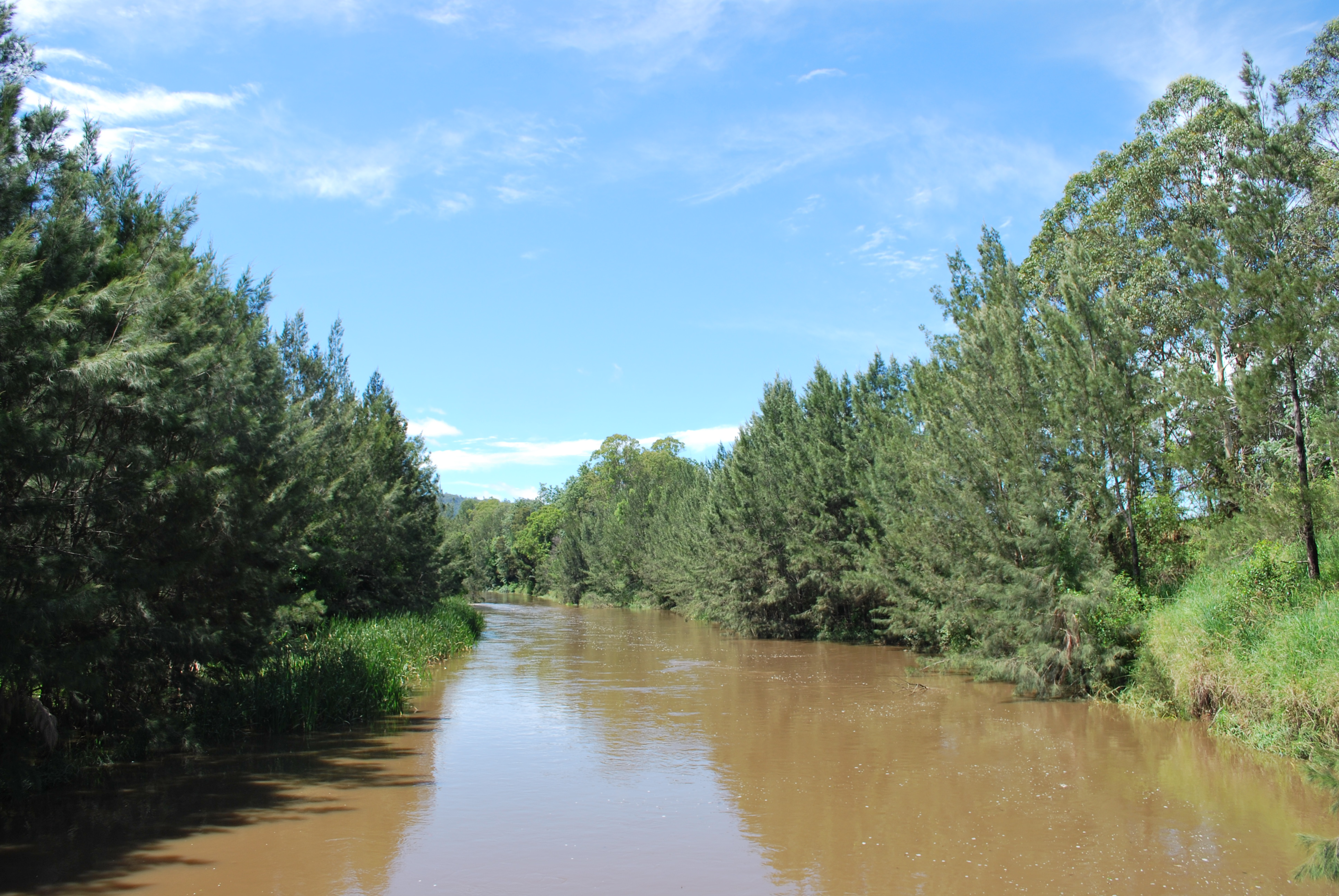
- The upper Mary River at Conondale

- Location of Mary River mouth in Queensland
- Etymology: Lady Mary Lennox, wife of Charles Augustus FitzRoy

Location
- Country: Australia
- State: Queensland
- Regions: South East Queensland, Wide Bay–Burnett

Physical characteristics
- Source: Conondale Range
  - location: Conondale, South East Queensland
  - coordinates: 26°47′39″S 152°44′41″E
  - elevation: 209 m (686 ft)
- Mouth: Great Sandy Strait
  - location: River Heads, Wide Bay–Burnett
  - coordinates: 25.4248°S 152.9380°E
  - elevation: 0 m (0 ft)
- Length: 291 km (181 mi)
- Basin size: 9,595 km^{2} (3,705 sq mi)
- Discharge
  - location: Near mouth
  - average: 55.4 m^{3}/s (1,750 GL/a)

Basin features
- Tributaries
  - left: Yabba Creek, Kandanga Creek, Widgee Creek, Wide Bay Creek, Munna Creek, Susan River
  - right: Obi Obi Creek, Tinana Creek, Deep Creek, Six Mile Creek
- Reservoir: Lake Borumba

The Mary River (Gubbi Gubbi: Moocooboola) is a major river system in the South East and Wide Bay–Burnett regions of Queensland, Australia. It is the sixth longest coastal river in the state and unique in that it flows south to north.

It is home to three threatened species, the Mary River turtle, white-throated snapping turtle and the Mary River cod. The Mary River was to be dammed with the construction of the Traveston Crossing Dam until it was cancelled due to environmental concerns. The river has experienced major floods in 1955, 1974, 1992, 1999, 2011, 2013 and 2022.

== Etymology ==
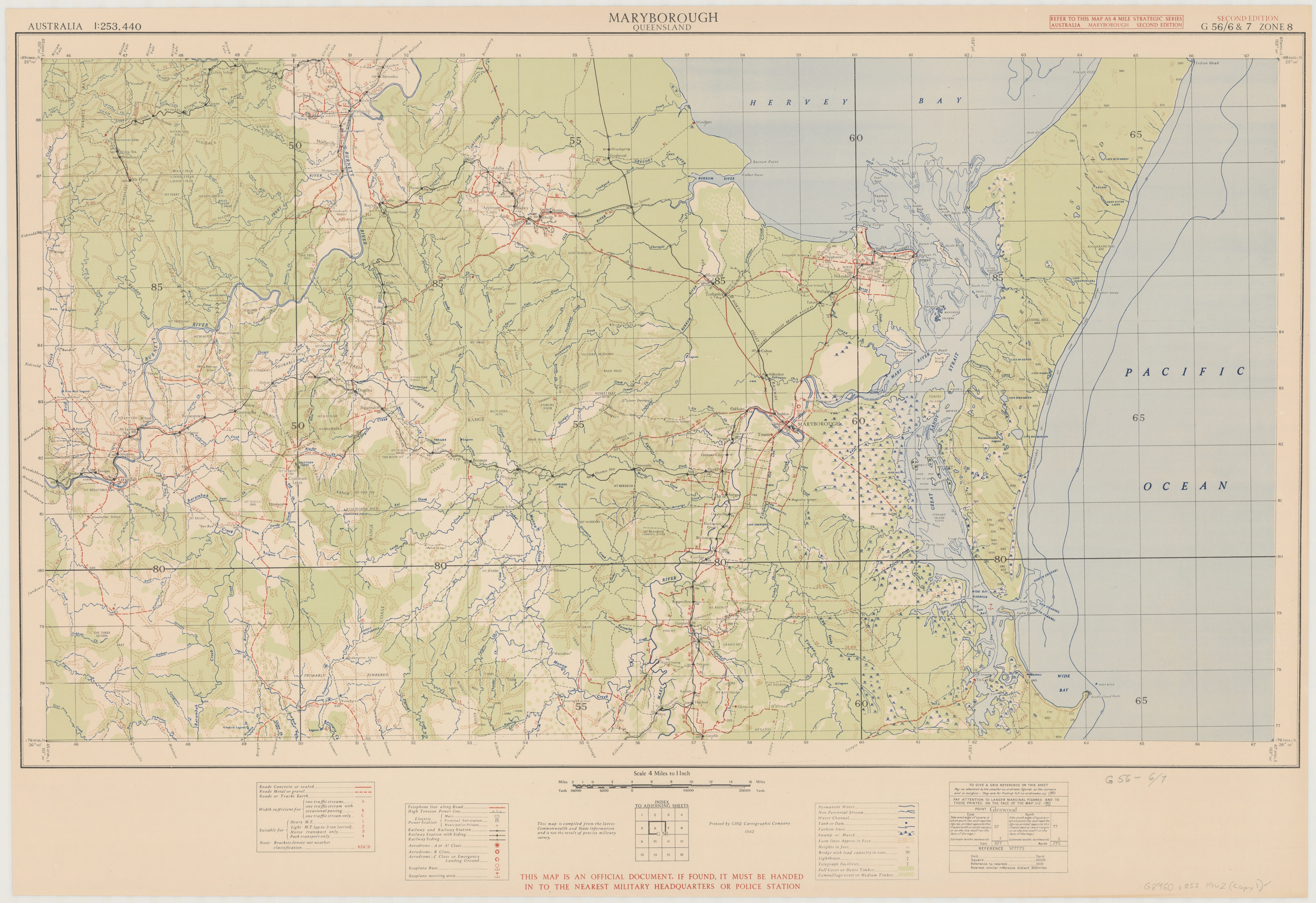
Topo map sheet with most of Mary River to mouth

The river was named Wide Bay River on 10 May 1842 by early European explorers, Andrew Petrie and Henry Stuart Russell. The official name was changed on 8 September 1847 (prior to Queensland becoming a separate colony) by Charles Augustus FitzRoy, then Governor of New South Wales, to Mary River — after his wife Lady Mary Lennox (15 August 1790 to 7 December 1847).

== History ==
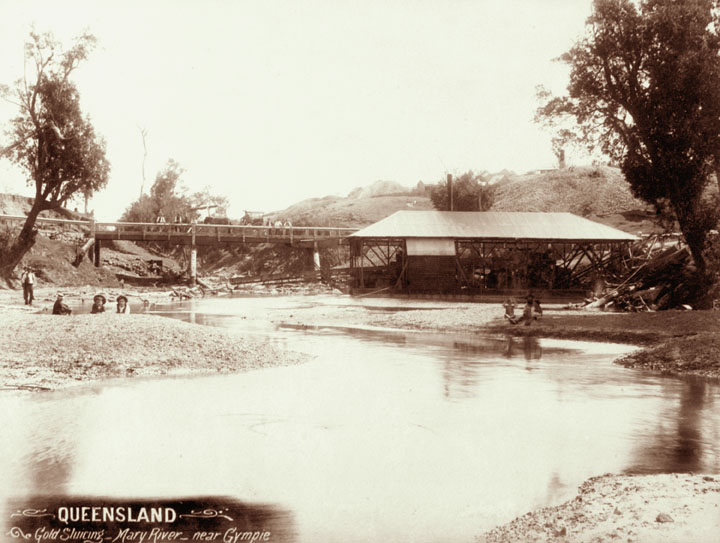
Gold sluicing in the 1890s

For tens of thousands of years the river formed a natural territorial boundary for aboriginal people and is a sacred site and traditional meeting place for the Kabi Kabi people. The Dalla people were traditionally associated with the lands at the headwaters of the river. While the Butchulla of K'gari, also regarded the river as a territorial boundary as expert canoe builders were known to sometimes extend their hunting along its reaches. Aboriginal people had different names for the different reaches of the river that were part of their country, however derivatives of the Gabbi Gabbi word Moocooboola were most often used.

The Mary River was used for rafting timber during the early years of European land settlement, and the discovery of gold at Gympie in 1867 brought an inflow of miners and pastoralists. Alluvial flats along the Mary River and some of its tributaries were used for cropping, and there was small-time dairying in the 1880s.

== Flooding ==
Reliable recording of flood events commenced in 1890.

In 1893, Gympie had its largest recorded flood with a peak height of 25.45 metres (83.5 ft).

Major flooding on the river occurred in 1955 when the height at Maryborough reached 11.28 metres (37.0 ft).

Major flooding of the Mary River occurred in February 1992 following the arrival of Cyclone Fran.

In February 1999, the Mary flooded Gympie after reaching a height of 21.95 metres (72.0 ft).

The Mary River experienced major flooding during the 2010–2011 Queensland floods. In some places the river rose 20 metres (66 ft). In Maryborough the river peaked at 8.2 metres (27 ft) while at Gympie the peak was 19.3 metres (63 ft). The Bruce Highway was closed to the north and south of Gympie and more than 50 homes and businesses were inundated. The high turbidity levels interfered with the natural breeding cycle for some of the river species.

In January 2013, the river experienced major flooding after ex-Cyclone Oswald passed over the catchment. This time the floods reached 10.7 metres (35 ft) above normal at Maryborough. At Gympie a peak of 20.3 metres (67 ft) was recorded.

In 2022, Gympie experienced a flood which peaked at 22.9 metres (75 ft). It was the second-largest recorded flood event for the river.

== Course and features ==
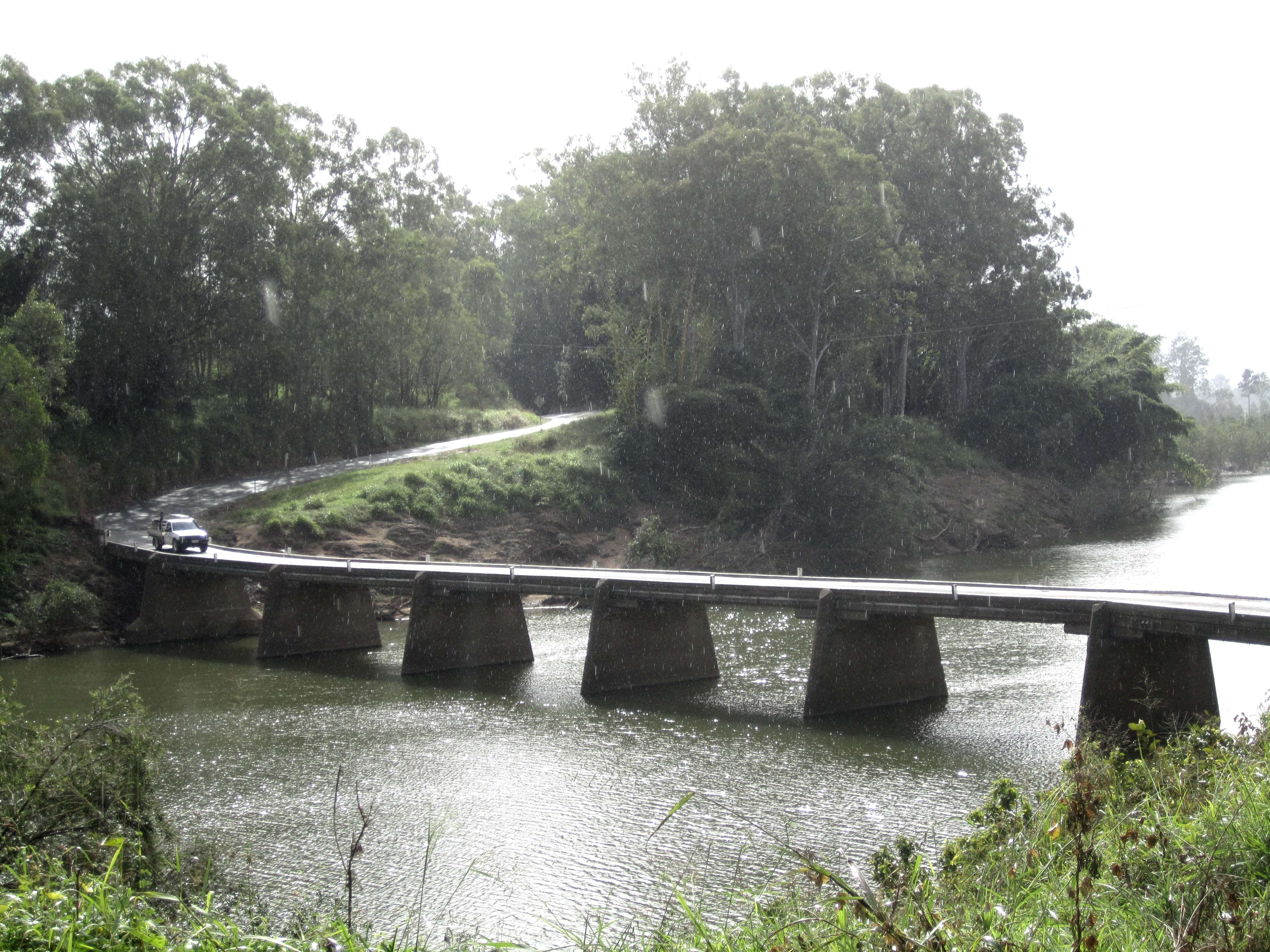
Mary River near Tiaro, 2012

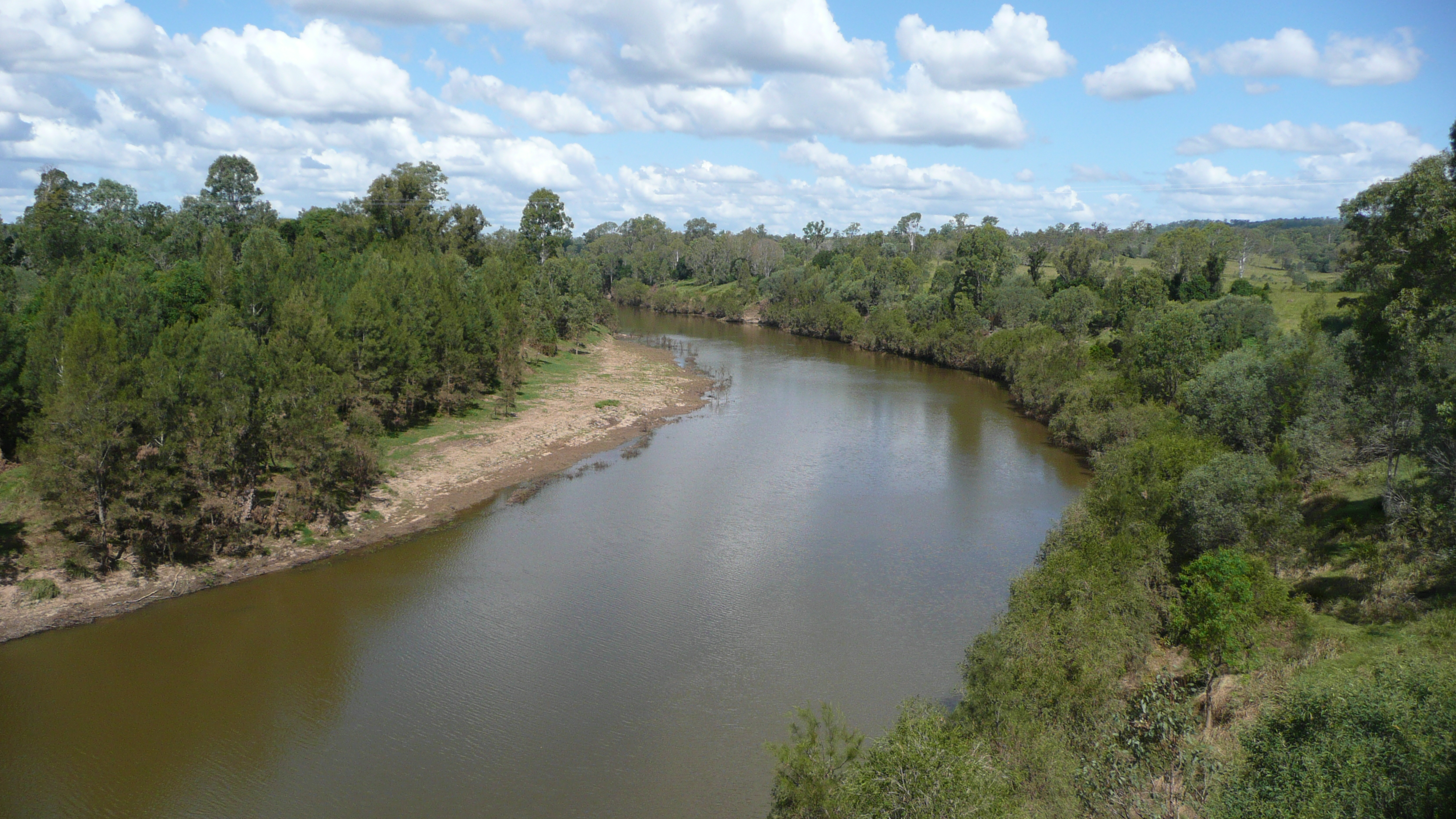
View from Dickabram Bridge, 2010

The river rises at Booroobin in the Sunshine Coast hinterland, west of Landsborough. From its source, the Mary River flows north through the towns of Kenilworth, Gympie, Tiaro and Maryborough before emptying into the Great Sandy Strait, a passage of water between the mainland and Fraser Island, near the town of River Heads, 17 km (11 mi) south of the town of Hervey Bay. The Mary River flows into the Great Sandy Strait, near wetlands of international significance recognised by the International agreement of the Ramsar Convention and the UNESCO Fraser Island World Heritage Area, which attracts thousands of visitors every year.

The river is navigable for 37 kilometres, from its mouth to Maryborough. Notable river crossings include the Dickabram Bridge, the Granville Bridge at Maryborough, and the Lamington Bridge.

From source to mouth, the Mary River is joined by nineteen tributaries, including the Tinana Creek, Munna Creek, Obi Obi Creek, Yabba Creek, Wide Bay Creek, Six Mile Creek, Deep Creek, and the Susan River. The river descends 209 metres (686 ft) over its 291-kilometre (181 mi) course. The river's catchment area is 9,595 square kilometres (3,705 sq mi) and is bounded by the Conondale, Jimna and Burnett Ranges.

While there are only two impoundments on the Mary River itself (the Gympie weir, and the barrage at Mungar, south of Tinana) there are a number of dams within the Mary River catchment on tributaries, Borumba Dam on Yabba Creek west of Imbil, Baroon Pocket Dam on Obi Obi Creek west of Montville, Six Mile Creek Dam on Six Mile Creek east of Cooroy, Cedar Pocket Dam on Deep Creek at Cedar Pocket, and two weirs (Talegalla and Teddington) and a barrage on Tinana Creek.

It is also a historical Australian river that contains gold as was first discovered in Gympie by James Nash (prospector).

== Erosion ==
The Mary River experiences river bank failure resulting in 80% of its fine sediment erosion. Many parts of the river contain stretches stripped of trees and damaged by hard-hoofed cattle and sand mining. Counter measures including driving pile fields into the riverbank, tree planting, riparian fencing and the installation of off-stream livestock watering points have stopped thousands of tonnes of sediment from entering the river.

== Flora and fauna ==
The endangered Mary River turtle (Elusor macrurus) lives in the river. Other aquatic life native to the river includes the Queensland lungfish (Neoceratodus forsteri) and the endangered Mary River cod (Maccullochella mariensis). Significant vulnerable and endangered species that live in the river also include endangered giant barred frog, cascade tree frog and Coxen's fig parrot and the vulnerable tusked frog, honey blue-eye fish, the Richmond birdwing butterfly and the Illidge's ant blue butterfly.

Saltwater crocodiles are occasionally seen in the lower reaches of the river, with one notable 3.5-metre (11 ft) crocodile being known to live in the river since April 2012. Although the official range for saltwater crocodiles stops near Gladstone, it is widely regarded that the Mary River is the most southerly range limit for crocodiles. Bull sharks are common however.

To protect the endangered Mary River cod breeding season, a ban on fishing in the upper Mary River catchment and adjoining creeks is enacted between 1 August and October 31.

== Traveston Crossing Dam ==
In light of the region's longest drought in one hundred years, the Queensland Government announced on 27 April 2006 its intention to dam part of the Mary River at Traveston Crossing, south of Gympie. The project was cancelled in November 2009, after being refused approval by Federal Environment Minister Peter Garrett.

The action had been planned to create a reservoir "almost as big as the Wivenhoe Dam" by 2011. The Traveston Dam was projected to inundate an area of fertile farmland, endangered regional ecosystems and small towns more than 1.3 times the area of Sydney Harbour. There was considerable local opposition to the proposal, with all Mary Valley and Sunshine Coast Shire Councils opposed to the dam proposal on a variety of grounds including: the dislocation of the local community from the inundated area; adverse effects on downstream communities; and environmental impacts such as the removal of one of the few remaining habitats for the vulnerable Queensland lungfish. More than 20,000 residents formally petitioned the Queensland State Parliament to halt the dam. There were further concerns that the geomechanics of the proposed site were not suitable for damming due to potentially significant leakage (due to the predominantly sandy substrate) and evaporation problems.

There was strong opposition to the dam from the wider and international community, based on environmental concerns related to the endangered Mary River cod, Mary River turtle, giant barred frog, cascade tree frog, Coxen's fig parrot, the vulnerable Queensland lungfish, tusked frog, honey blue-eye fish, the Richmond birdwing butterfly and the Illidge's ant blue butterfly. There were also fears for the dugong, a globally vulnerable species. It was alleged that reduced fresh water flowing to the Great Sandy Strait would have affected the growth of seagrass, the dugong's primary food source.

The Mary River turtle and the Queensland lungfish attracted particular attention regarding their conservation. The Mary River turtle, whose only known home is the Mary River, is a cloacal ventilator ("bum breather" – it uses oxygen from water taken in through its tail), and is listed in the top 25 most endangered turtle species in the world. The lungfish also has great significance to evolutionary biologists. It requires the rapids in order to breed, and much of its breeding habitat had already been interrupted by other dams in Queensland. Professor Jean Joss of Macquarie University stated, in a submission to the Senate Inquiry 2007: "The Mary River dam would almost certainly push the lungfish to 'Critically Endangered,' and in the long term will lead to its extinction in the wild." The Mary River cod, which only lives naturally in the Mary River system, is already Critically Endangered. It is completely protected, and it is illegal to fish them.

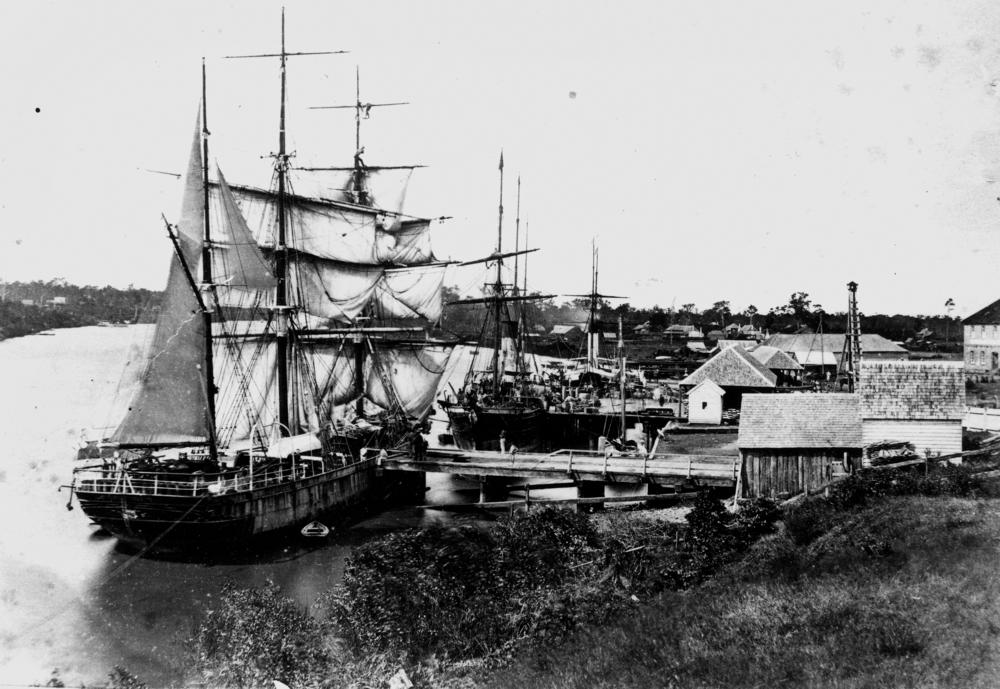
The barque Maria Ysasi, 1874

== Port of Maryborough ==
The Port of Maryborough was opened in 1847 and in 1859 it was declared a port of entry. In 1856, after the river became unnavigable to larger vessels a new township and port were established. From the 1850s to the end of the century the port was one of Australia's busiest immigration ports. Some authorities called the port "Wide Bay" well into the 1860s.

== See also ==
- List of rivers of Australia § Queensland
