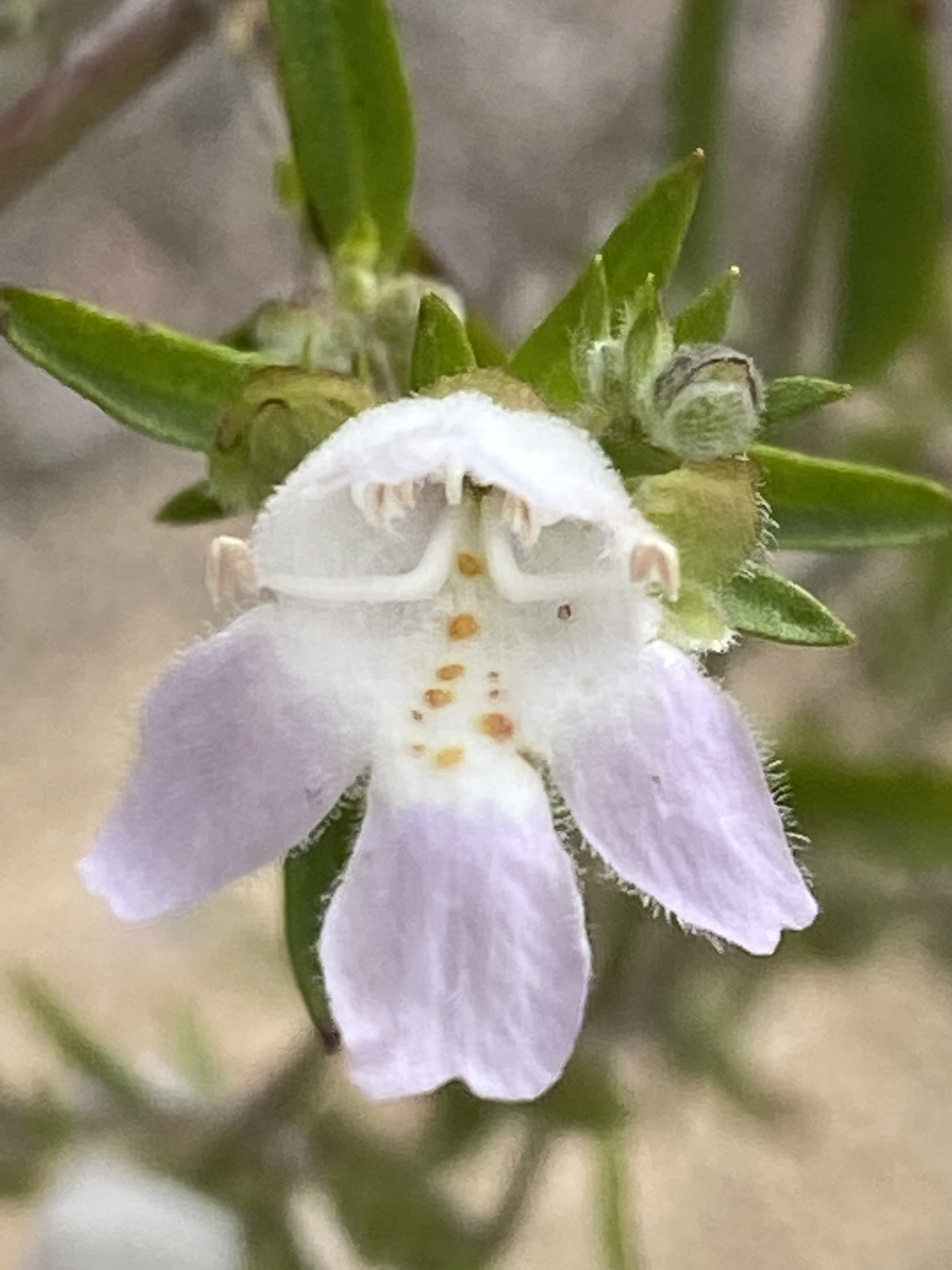

Scientific classification
- Kingdom: Plantae
- Clade: Tracheophytes
- Clade: Angiosperms
- Clade: Eudicots
- Clade: Asterids
- Order: Lamiales
- Family: Lamiaceae
- Genus: Prostanthera
- Species: P. lithospermoides

Binomial name
- Prostanthera lithospermoides F.Muell.

= Prostanthera lithospermoides =

Species of plant

Prostanthera lithospermoides is a tall, spreading shrub with white or pale mauve flowers. It is found in New South Wales and Queensland.

== Description ==
Prostanthera lithospermoides is a tall, open shrub 2–3 m (6 ft 7 in – 9 ft 10 in) high with stems covered in a layer of light coloured, very short, interwoven, silky, flattened hairs. The leaves are oblong to lance shaped 2–5 cm (0.79–1.97 in) long ending in a point at the apex, smooth margins, concave or flat on a short petiole. The blue, white or light mauve flowers have several yellowish blotches inside the corolla, and are borne in the leaf axils on long arching branches. It is one of the few species in the genus that does not have a "mint" fragrance when the leaves are crushed.

== Distribution ==
This species is found growing near Westmar, Glenmorgan and Yuleba in Queensland and near Enngonia in New South Wales.

== Taxonomy ==
Prostanthera lithospermoides was first formally described in 1868 by Ferdinand von Mueller and the description was published in Fragmenta Phytographiae Australiae.
