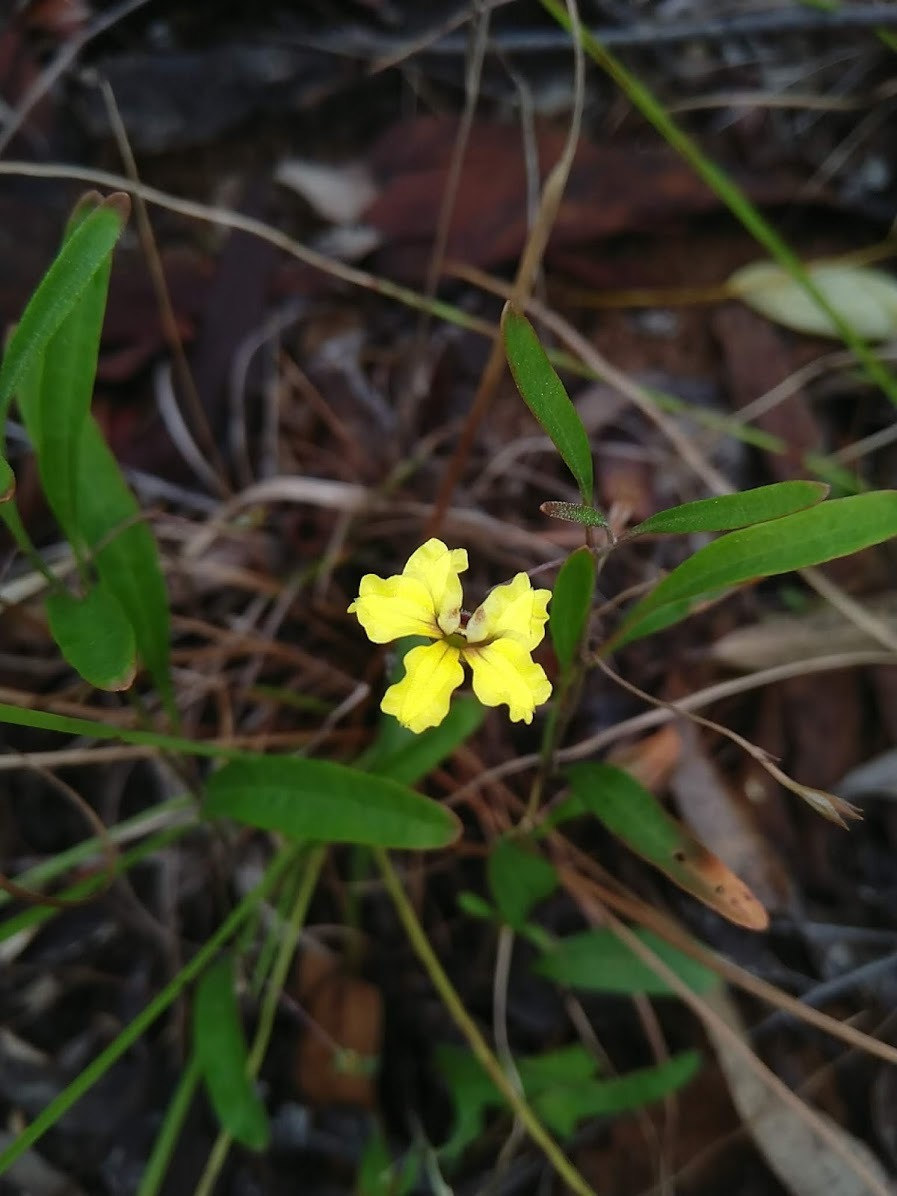
- On Mount Urah

Scientific classification
- Kingdom: Plantae
- Clade: Tracheophytes
- Clade: Angiosperms
- Clade: Eudicots
- Clade: Asterids
- Order: Asterales
- Family: Goodeniaceae
- Genus: Goodenia
- Species: G. delicata

Binomial name
- Goodenia delicata Carolin

= Goodenia delicata =

Species of plant

Goodenia delicata is a species of flowering plant in the family Goodeniaceae and is endemic to eastern Australia. It is a low-lying to ascending herb with linear to narrow elliptic leaves mostly at the base of the plant, and racemes of yellow flowers.

== Description ==
Goodenia delicata is a low-lying to ascending, short-lived herb with more or less hairy stems to 50 cm (20 in) long that become glabrous as they age. The leaves are mostly at the base of the plant, linear to narrow elliptic, 20–60 mm (0.79–2.36 in) long and 2–13 mm (0.079–0.512 in) wide, sometimes with teeth on the edges. The flowers are arranged in racemes up to 400 mm (16 in) long on a peduncle 5–20 mm (0.20–0.79 in) long with linear bracteoles 1–2 mm (0.039–0.079 in) long at the base, each flower on a pedicel 5–10 mm (0.20–0.39 in) long. The sepals are narrow egg-shaped, 2–2.5 mm (0.079–0.098 in) long, the corolla yellow, 10–13 mm (0.39–0.51 in) long. The lower lobes of the corolla are 4–4.5 mm (0.16–0.18 in) long with wings about 1 mm (0.039 in) wide. Flowering occurs from October to June and the fruit is a more or less spherical capsule about 8 mm (0.31 in) in diameter.

== Taxonomy and naming ==
Goodenia delicata was first formally described in 1990 by Roger Charles Carolin in the journal Telopea from material collected in 1959 by Leslie Pedley near Westmar in Queensland.

== Distribution and habitat ==
This goodenia grows in forest and woodland on the tablelands of south-eastern Queensland and northern New South Wales.
