= Trevor St Baker =

Australian businessperson

Trevor St Baker AO
- Occupation: Investor in Vales Point power station
- Board member of: ERM Power Limited; Sunset Power International; St Baker Energy Trust; Energy Policy Institute of Australia; Tritium Pty Ltd

Trevor Charles St Baker AO is an Australian businessperson with interests in power station and fuel supply development. He is a director of the St Baker Energy Trust and a chair of Sunset Power International (trading as Delta Electricity). He is also a founder and a deputy chair of ERM Power Limited.

== Career ==
=== Early career ===
St Baker worked in planning and leadership roles within New South Wales and Queensland GOC electricity utilities during the 1960s and 1970s. He worked on the establishment of Queensland's first power station planning department in 1971 and its first Energy Resources Division in 1975. The Division was responsible for deregulating power station fuel procurement in Queensland. Steaming coal developments were facilitated at Blackwater and Curragh and long-term coal procurement contracts were secured to supply power stations at Gladstone, Tarong, Callide B and Stanwell.

=== ERM Power (1980–present) ===
In 1980, St Baker entered the private sector, establishing several companies which would eventually become ERM Power. The first of these was the private company, ERM Consultants Pty Ltd which operated Australia-wide and internationally. During the 1990s, St Baker established one of Australia's first private power development companies, Energy Resource Managers Pty Ltd (later renamed Sunset Power Pty Ltd). While St Baker was acting as Executive Chairman, the company developed Queensland's Oakey power station followed by five new gas-fired power stations in New South Wales, Queensland and Western Australia. Energy Resource Managers Pty Ltd's development represented 50% of all new power generation projects constructed in Australia during the 2000s.

In 2006, St Baker established ERM Power Pty Ltd to manage the existing power stations and expand into the energy retail business. It was listed on the Australian Stock Exchange (ASX) in 2010 as ERM Power Limited, after growing to become the fourth largest electricity retailer in Australia. St Baker went on to pursue and develop electricity retail business in the USA. St Baker resigned from as a director in 2017.

=== Sunset Power International (2013–present) ===
In 2013, St Baker established Sunset Power International Pty Ltd. The company bid on new power generation projects in Myanmar in 2013 and Victoria, Australia in 2014. In 2015, the company acquired Delta Electricity, the owner and operator of Vales Point power station which sits on the shore of Lake Macquarie.

In 2013, Sunset Power international established the StBaker Energy Innovation Fund, (StBEIF) and invested in several start-up energy research and development commercialization businesses. The trust was established by St Baker and has mentored and supported Australian founders of new technology businesses entering the energy sector. Products under development by its trustees include: flat printed light, printed solar photo-voltaic cells and printed energy storage, cloud-enabled intelligent controllers and powermetric customer access devices and electric vehicle fast chargers. Trevor is a Director of six of the companies in which StBEIF is invested, and acts as chairman of the two most advanced: Tritium Pty Ltd (which produces electric vehicle charging stations) and Southern Cross Printed Electronics Pty Ltd (which is developing printed LED lighting for various applications).

=== SMR Nuclear Technology (2012–present) ===
In 2012, St Baker founded SMR Nuclear Technology Pty Ltd "to advise on and facilitate the siting, development and operation of the safe nuclear power generation technologies, principally by Small Modular Reactors (SMRs)." The company is managed by St Baker (Director), Tony Irwin (Technical Director), Robert Pritchard (chairman) and Barrie Hill (managing director).

=== Other roles ===
St Baker ran as a National Party candidate for the Queensland electorate of Dickson in the 1993 Australian election.

He chaired the National Generators’ Forum for three years, ending in 2013. He was a non-executive director of the Queensland Resources Council prior to 2015 and remains on the board of the Energy Policy Institute of Australia. St Baker co-founded St Baker Wilkes Indigenous Educational Foundation Limited (and acts as its chair) and the St. Baker Family Philanthropic Trust. In 2015, he owned shares in Metgasco, Red Sky Energy and Empire Oil & Gas.

== Political views ==
In 2017, Baker told The Australian Financial Review that "Baseloading of intermittent renewables to replace coal in the foreseeable future... will just drive business out of the country." He believes that reliance on renewable energy in South Australia has led to increased prices for wholesale electricity there. He described claims that Australia no longer needs cheap, baseload power generation as "silly" and has previously advocated unsuccessfully for the reopening of Northern power station in Port Augusta and delaying the permanent closure of Hazelwood power station in Victoria.

== Personal life ==
St Baker lives in St Lucia, a suburb of Brisbane, Queensland.

In 2016 St Baker was appointed an Officer of the Order of Australia "for distinguished service to business and commerce as a leader and executive in the energy sector, and through philanthropic support for a range of health, arts and Aboriginal youth programs".

=== Net worth ===
As of May 2023 The Australian Financial Review assessed St Baker's net worth as A$1.22 billion in the 2023 Rich List. An earlier prediction in 2015 the Financial Review reported that St Baker would join the "billionaire class" following a revaluation of Vales Point power station in 2017; first achieved in the 2021 Rich List.

Year	Financial Review Rich List	
Year	Rank	Net worth ($A)
2015		
2016		
2017	not listed	n/a
2018	180 ▲	$472 million ▲
2019	154 ▲	$647 million ▲
2020	149 ▲	$699 million ▲
2021	149	$1.00 billion ▲
2022	88 ▲	$1.50 billion ▲
2023	122 ▼	$1.22 billion ▼

Legend
Icon	Description
Steady	Has not changed from the previous year
▲	Has increased from the previous year
▼	Has decreased from the previous year
