= Flinton, Queensland =

Flinton
- Town
- Interactive map of Flinton
- Coordinates: 27.8933°S 149.5569°E
- Country: Australia
- State: Queensland
- LGA: Western Downs Region
- Location: 118 km (73 mi) ENE of St George; 138 km (86 mi) NW of Goondiwindi; 211 km (131 mi) SW of Dalby; 402 km (250 mi) W of Brisbane

Government
  - State electorate: Warrego
  - Federal division: Maranoa

Area
  - Total: 568.9 km^{2} (219.7 sq mi)

Population
  - Total: 29 (2021 census)
  - Density: 0.0510/km^{2} (0.1320/sq mi)
- Time zone: UTC+10:00 (AEST)
- Postcode: 4422
Localities around Flinton
Teelba	Coomrith	Inglestone
St George	Flinton	Westmar
St George	North Bungunya	Tarawera

Flinton is a rural town and locality in the Western Downs Region, Queensland, Australia. In the 2021 census, the locality of Flinton had a population of 29 people.

== Geography ==
The Moonie River flows through Flinton from east (Westmar) to west (St George); the town of Flinton is located just to the north of the river.

The Moonie Highway passes through Flinton from east (Westmar) to south-west; the town is located 5 kilometres (3.1 mi) north of the highway on Flinton Road.

The Ula Ula State Forest is in the southern part of Flinton. Apart from this, the land is used for a mixture of crop growing and grazing on native vegetation.

== History ==
Flinton appears on a survey plan from 20 Sept 1916.

Flinton Provisional School opened on 26 June 1929 and closed in 1935.

== Demographics ==
In the 2016 census, the locality of Flinton had a population of 42 people.

In the 2021 census, the locality of Flinton had a population of 29 people.

== Education ==
There are no schools in Flinton. The nearest government primary schools are Westmar State School in neighbouring Westmar to the east and Teelba State School in neighbouring Teelba to the north-west. The nearest government secondary school is St George State High School in neighbouring St George to the south-west, but it is sufficiently far away that distance education or boarding school would be alternatives.

== Attractions ==
The Flinton Race Club hold horse-racing events at the Flinton Racecourse on Grills Road (27.8879°S 149.5611°E).
