= Teelba, Queensland =

Teelba
- Suburb
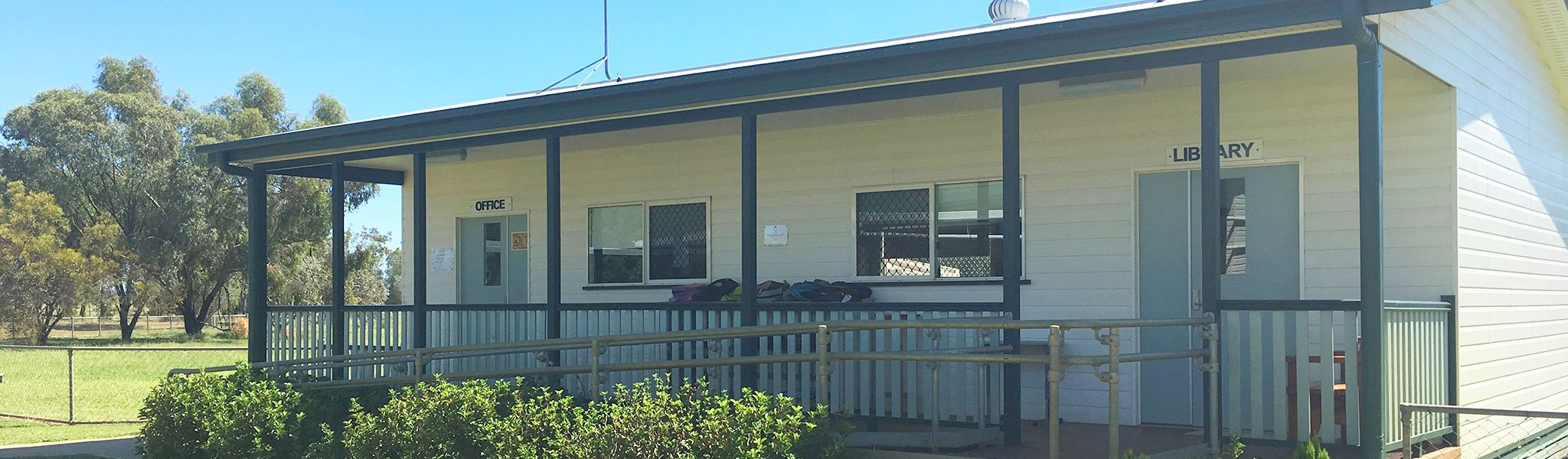
- Teelba State School, 2025

- Interactive map of Teelba
- Coordinates: 27.5033°S 149.3691°E
- Country: Australia
- State: Queensland
- LGA: Maranoa Region
- Location: 54.7 km (34.0 mi) SE of Surat; 134 km (83 mi) SSE of Roma; 294 km (183 mi) W of Toowoomba; 421 km (262 mi) W of Brisbane

Government
  - State electorate: Warrego
  - Federal division: Maranoa

Area
  - Total: 1,027.9 km^{2} (396.9 sq mi)

Population
  - Total: 82 (2021 census)
  - Density: 0.0798/km^{2} (0.2066/sq mi)
- Time zone: UTC+10:00 (AEST)
- Postcode: 4423
Suburbs around Teelba
Parknook	Glenmorgan	Glenmorgan
Parknook	Teelba	Coomrith
St George	Flinton	Flinton

Teelba is a rural locality in the Maranoa Region, Queensland, Australia. In the 2021 census, Teelba had a population of 82 people.

== Geography ==
Teelba is a watershed. In the north of the locality, Murilla Creek flows north into the Condamine River drainage basin, while in the south the Teelba Creek flows south into the Moonie River drainage basin.

== History ==
Teelba Creek State School opened on 5 July 1965, but was renamed Teelba State School on 24 September 1965.

== Demographics ==
In the 2016 census, Teelba had a population of 44 people.

In the 2021 census, Teelba had a population of 82 people.

== Education ==
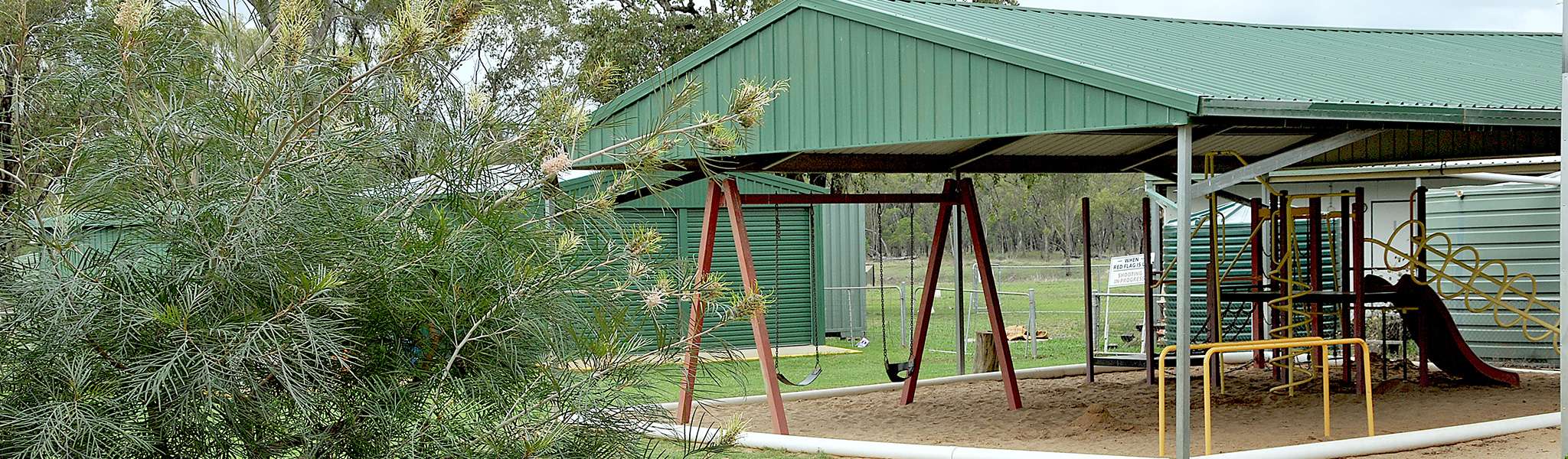
Playground at Teelba State School, 2025

Teelba State School is a government primary (Prep-6) school for boys and girls at Teelba Road just north of the crossing of Teelba Creek (27.5345°S 149.3939°E). In 2016, the school had an enrolment of 23 students with 3 teachers (2 full-time equivalent) and 5 non-teaching staff (2 full-time equivalent). In 2018, the school had an enrolment of 25 students with 3 teachers (2 full-time equivalent) and 5 non-teaching staff (2 full-time equivalent).

There are no secondary schools in Teelba. The nearest government secondary school is Surat State School (to Year 10) in Surat to the north-west, but it would be too distant for students living in the south of Teelba. Also, there are no nearby schools providing education to Year 12. The alternatives are distance education and boarding school.
