= Southwood, Queensland =

Southwood
- Town
- Interactive map of Southwood
- Coordinates: 27.7666°S 149.9775°E
- Country: Australia
- State: Queensland
- LGA: Western Downs Region
- Location: 34.7 km (21.6 mi) E of Westmar; 37.5 km (23.3 mi) SW of Moonie; 96.7 km (60.1 mi) N of Goondiwindi; 150 km (93 mi) SW of Dalby; 344 km (214 mi) W of Brisbane

Government
  - State electorate: Warrego
  - Federal division: Maranoa

Area
  - Total: 842.2 km^{2} (325.2 sq mi)

Population
  - Total: 57 (2021 census)
  - Density: 0.0677/km^{2} (0.1753/sq mi)
- Time zone: UTC+10:00 (AEST)
- Postcode: 4406
Localities around Southwood
Inglestone	Hannaford	Moonie
Westmar	Southwood	Moonie
Lundavra	Lundavra	Moonie

Southwood is a rural town and locality in the Western Downs Region, Queensland, Australia. In the 2021 census, the locality of Southwood had a population of 57 people.

== Geography ==
The Moonie Highway (State Route 49) runs through from east to south-west.

== History ==
The town of Southwood was surveyed on 19 February 1886 by Fred W. Barlow on the northern banks of the Moonie River within the Wild Horse Paradise pastoral run. A police station and a couple of hotels were established but the town never developed and disappeared after the police station closed in 1911.

By the 1960s, the only thing remaining in the town was the gravestone of Amelia, the wife of Constable Boyle, who died in 1891.

== Demographics ==
In the 2016 census, the locality of Southwood had a population of 84 people.

In the 2021 census, the locality of Southwood had a population of 57 people.

== Education ==
There are no schools in Southwood. The nearest government primary schools are Westmar State School in neighbouring Westmar to the west and Moonie State School in neighbouring Moonie to the north-east. There are no secondary schools nearby. The alternatives are distance education and boarding school.
