= Coomrith, Queensland =

Coomrith
- Suburb
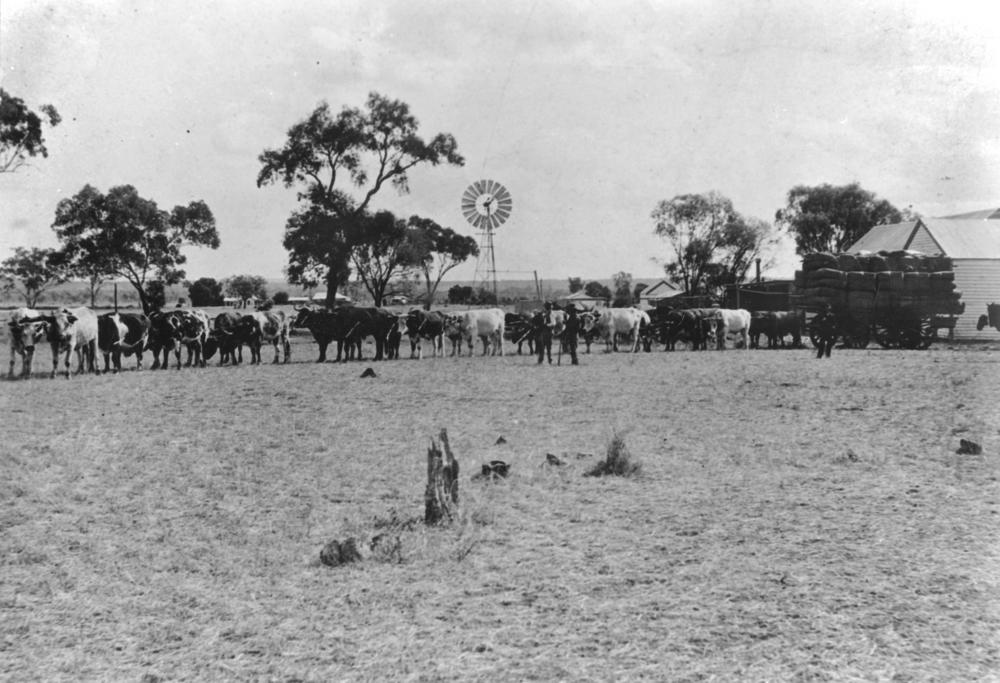
- Mark Quinn's bullock team leaving Coomrith Station with a load of wool for Miles, 1918

- Interactive map of Coomrith
- Coordinates: 27.5761°S 149.6086°E
- Country: Australia
- State: Queensland
- LGA: Western Downs Region
- Location: 44.8 km (27.8 mi) SW of Meandarra; 97.2 km (60.4 mi) WSW of Tara; 186 km (116 mi) WSW of Dalby; 266 km (165 mi) W of Toowoomba; 396 km (246 mi) W of Brisbane

Government
  - State electorate: Warrego
  - Federal division: Maranoa

Area
  - Total: 634.0 km^{2} (244.8 sq mi)

Population
  - Total: 52 (2021 census)
  - Density: 0.0820/km^{2} (0.2124/sq mi)
- Time zone: UTC+10:00 (AEST)
- Postcode: 4422
Suburbs around Coomrith
Teelba	Glenmorgan	Meandarra
Teelba	Coomrith	Inglestone
Flinton	Inglestone	Inglestone

Coomrith is a locality in the Western Downs Region, Queensland, Australia. In the 2021 census, Coomrith had a population of 52 people.

== Geography ==
The Meandarra Talwood Road (State Route 74) passes to the east.

The land use is predominantly grazing on native vegetation and some crop growing.

== History ==
The locality takes its name from the parish which in turn has named after a pastoral run whose name appears on a 1883 map.

== Demographics ==
In the 2016 census, Coomrith had a population of 40 people.

In the 2021 census, Coomrith had a population of 52 people.

== Education ==
There are no schools in Coomrith. The nearest government primary schools are Glenmorgan State School in neighbouring Glenmorgan to the north, Meandarra State School in neighbouring Meandarra to the north-east, Westmar State School in Westmar to the south-east, and Teelba State School in neighbouring Teelba to the west. There are no secondary schools within range of a daily commute from Coomrith, so the alternatives are distance education and boarding school.
