= Condamine, Queensland =

Condamine
- Town
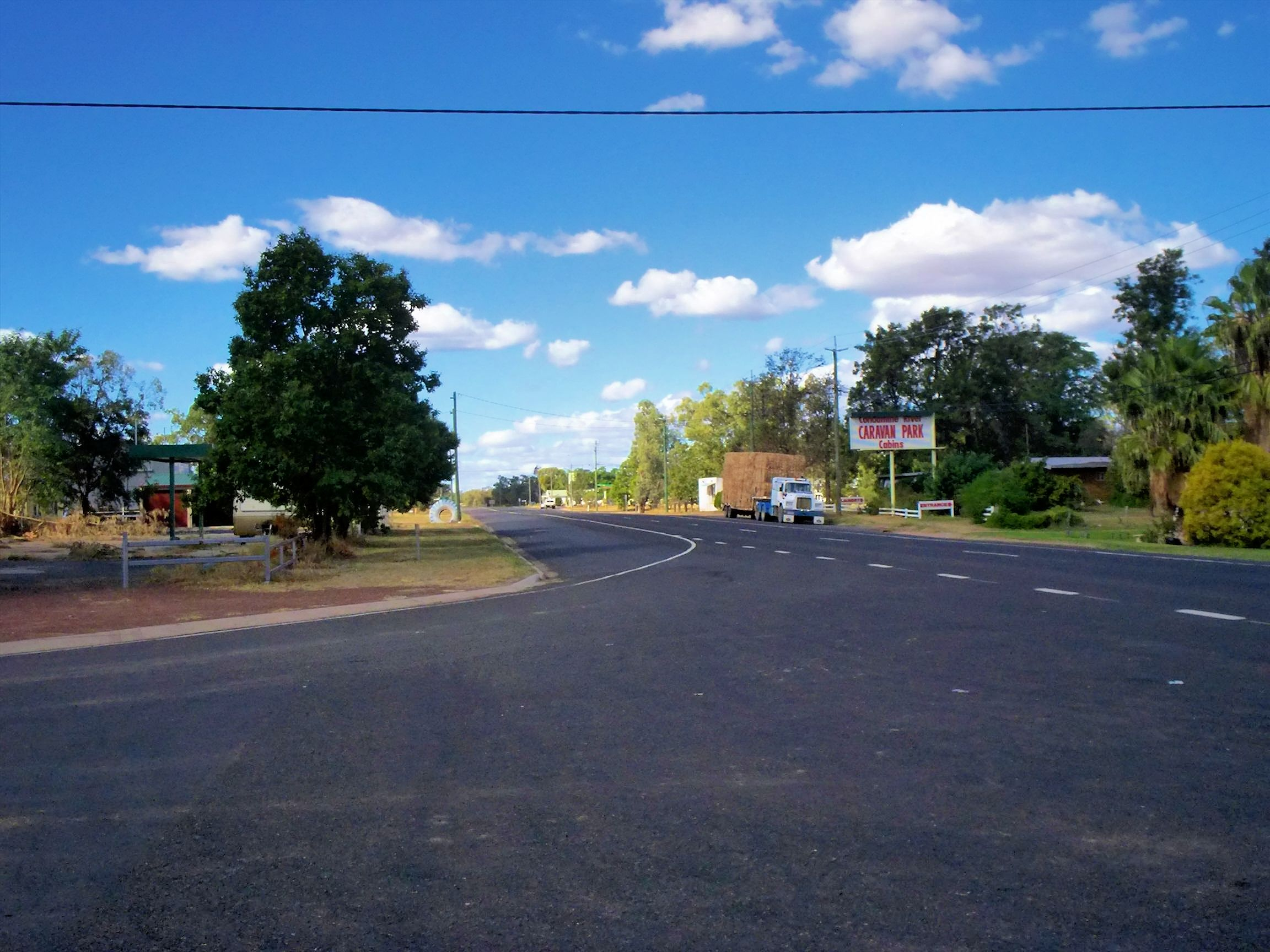
- The Leichhardt Highway, passing through Condamine

- Interactive map of Condamine
- Coordinates: 26.9258°S 150.1363°E
- Country: Australia
- State: Queensland
- LGA: Western Downs Region
- Location: 33.1 km (20.6 mi) S of Miles; 124 km (77 mi) WNW of Dalby; 335 km (208 mi) WNW of Brisbane

Government
  - State electorate: Warrego
  - Federal division: Maranoa

Area
  - Total: 779.3 km^{2} (300.9 sq mi)

Population
  - Total: 294 (2021 census)
  - Density: 0.3773/km^{2} (0.9771/sq mi)
- Time zone: UTC+10:00 (AEST)
- Postcode: 4416
Localities around Condamine
| Drillham South | Miles | Nangram |
| Pine Hills; Yulabilla | Condamine | Wieambilla |
| Meandarra; Hannaford | Barramornie | The Gums |

Condamine is a rural town and locality in the Western Downs Region, Queensland, Australia. In the 2021 census, the locality of Condamine had a population of 294 people.

Condamine is claimed to be the location of the invention of the Condamine Bell, a small bell made from sheet metal used to locate herds of cattle.

== Geography ==
The town is 333 kilometres (207 mi) north west of the state capital Brisbane and 34 kilometres (21 mi) south from the town of Miles, in the Western Downs Region local government area. It is located in the centre of the locality.

The Leichhardt Highway traverses the locality from north to south passing through the town, and the Roma-Condamine Road enters from the west.

The Condamine River passes to the west of the town.

The Roma to Brisbane Pipeline passes to the south of Condamine. There are two gas compression facilities to the east of Condamine. This location is the intersection of the Roma to Brisbane pipeline, the Peat/Scotia Lateral and the Braemar Line Pack Pipeline.

== History ==
Tieryboo Post Office opened on 21 May 1856. It was renamed Condamine in July of that year.

Condamine State School opened on 1 January 1863.

Water's Vale Provisional School opened on 9 May 1921 and closed in 1923. It was located "via Condamine".

On 30 December 2010, flooding forced evacuation of the town, with the level of the river expected to exceed 15 metres (49 ft). The town was evacuated twice in 10 days during January 2011 as the rains continued and caused flash floods. The first flood peaked at 13.2 metres (43 ft).

== Demographics ==
In the 2016 census, the locality of Condamine had a population of 384 people. 75.5% of people were born in Australia and 80.9% of people spoke only English at home. The most common response for religion was Anglican at 32.9%.

In the 2021 census, the locality of Condamine had a population of 294 people.

== Facilities ==
Condamine is serviced by a small hotel and a roadhouse. The Condamine BP roadhouse is an old style classic truckies' roadhouse.

== Education ==
Condamine State School is a government primary (Prep–6) school for boys and girls at Kennedy Street (26.9250°S 150.1346°E). In 2016, the school had an enrolment of 32 students with 5 teachers (3 equivalent full-time) and 4 non-teaching staff (2 equivalent full-time). It is one of the oldest state primary schools in Queensland. In 2018, the school had an enrolment of 26 students with 4 teachers (3 full-time equivalent) and 4 non-teaching staff (2 full-time equivalent).

There are no secondary schools in Condamine with the nearest government secondary school being Miles State High School in Miles, 34 kilometres (21 mi) north of Condamine.

== Sport ==
Condamine has a rugby union team which compete in the Darling Downs Rugby Union competition, against such teams as the University of Southern Queensland Rugby Union Club, Toowoomba Rangers Rugby Union Club, Toowoomba City Rugby Club, Roma Echidnas, the Condamine Cods, the Dalby Wheatmen, the Goondiwindi Emus, the Warwick Water Rats and the University of Queensland Rugby Union Club (Gatton Campus).
