= Parknook, Queensland =

Parknook
- Suburb
- Interactive map of Parknook
- Coordinates: 27.3933°S 149.1672°E
- Country: Australia
- State: Queensland
- LGA: Maranoa Region
- Location: 26.8 km (16.7 mi) S of Surat; 106 km (66 mi) SSE of Roma; 340 km (210 mi) W of Toowoomba; 468 km (291 mi) W of Brisbane

Government
  - State electorate: Warrego
  - Federal division: Maranoa

Area
  - Total: 1,202.3 km^{2} (464.2 sq mi)

Population
  - Total: 55 (2021 census)
  - Density: 0.0457/km^{2} (0.1185/sq mi)
- Time zone: UTC+10:00 (AEST)
- Postcode: 4417
Suburbs around Parknook
Noorindoo	Noorindoo	Glenmorgan
Wellesley	Parknook	Teelba
St George	St George	Teelba

Parknook is a rural locality in the Maranoa Region, Queensland, Australia. In the 2021 census, Parknook had a population of 55 people.

== Geography ==
The Surat Developmental Road (State Route 87) runs along the northern boundary.

== Demographics ==
In the 2016 census, Parknook had a population of 74 people.

In the 2021 census, Parknook had a population of 55 people.

== Education ==
There are no schools in Parknook. The nearest government primary schools are Surat State School in Surat to the north-west, Teelba State School in neighbouring Teelba to the east, and Glenmorgan State School in neighbouring Glenmorgan to the north-east. The nearest government secondary school is Surat State School to Year 10; however, students living in the south of the locality would be too distant for a daily commute. Also, there are no secondary schools offering education to Year 12 nearby. The alternatives are distance education and boarding school.
