= The Gums, Queensland =

The Gums
- Town
- Interactive map of The Gums
- Coordinates: 27.3402°S 150.205°E
- Country: Australia
- State: Queensland
- LGA: Western Downs Region
- Location: 83 km (52 mi) S of Miles; 118 km (73 mi) W of Dalby; 200 km (120 mi) W of Toowoomba; 328 km (204 mi) W of Brisbane

Government
  - State electorate: Warrego
  - Federal division: Maranoa

Area
  - Total: 1,084.4 km^{2} (418.7 sq mi)

Population
  - Total: 165 (2021 census)
  - Density: 0.1522/km^{2} (0.3941/sq mi)
- Time zone: UTC+10:00 (AEST)
- Postcode: 4406
Localities around The Gums
| Barramornie | Condamine | Wieambilla |
| Hannaford | The Gums | Tara |
| Hannaford | Moonie | Moonie |

The Gums is a rural town and locality in the Western Downs Region, Queensland, Australia. In the 2021 census, the locality of The Gums had a population of 165 people.

== Geography ==
The town is at the junction of the Leichhardt Highway and the Surat Developmental Road on the Darling Downs, 329 kilometres (204 mi) west of the state capital, Brisbane.

The Glenmorgan railway line passes through the locality from east (Tara) to west (Hannaford). In 2017, there were three stations serving the locality: The Gums railway station (which is north of but close to the town, 27.3286°S 150.1853°E), Cabawin railway station (27.3294°S 150.2503°E), and South Glen railway station (27.3053°S 150.3167°E). However, in 2019, only The Gums railway station was still operational.

The land use is predominantly grazing on native vegetation with some crop growing.

== History ==
A cemetery was established in 1905.

South Glen Provisional School opened in 1913 and closed circa 1921.

The Gums State School opened on 27 January 1913.

Circa February 1914, a Methodist church was opened at The Gums.

The name of the town was derived from The Gums railway station, on the Glenmorgan railway line from Dalby to Glenmorgan, used from 1924.

Cabawin Provisional School opened on 30 January 1934. In 1952, it became Cabawin State School. It closed in 1960. It was on Cabawin South Road (27.3644°S 150.2582°E).

== Demographics ==
In the 2006 census, the locality of The Gums and the surrounding area had a population of 169 people.

In the 2016 census, the locality of The Gums had a population of 159 people.

In the 2021 census, the locality of The Gums had a population of 165 people.

== Education ==
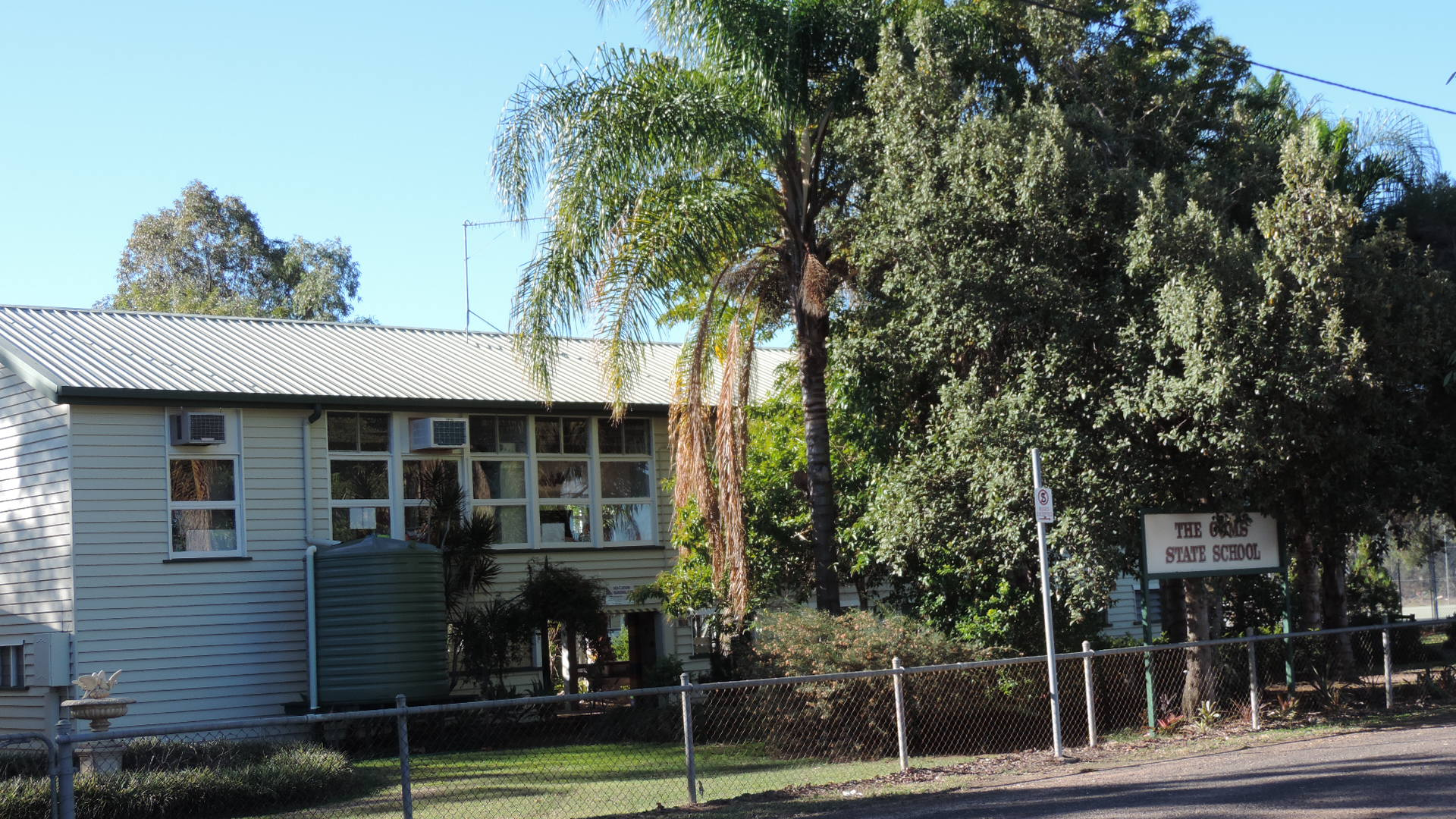
The Gums State School, 2016

The Gums State School is a government primary (Prep-6) school for boys and girls at 12051 Surat Developmental Road (27.3414°S 150.1994°E). In 2017, the school had an enrolment of 22 students with 4 teachers (2 full-time equivalent) and 5 non-teaching staff (2 full-time equivalent).

There are no secondary schools in The Gums. The nearest government secondary school is Tara Shire State College in Tara.

== Facilities ==
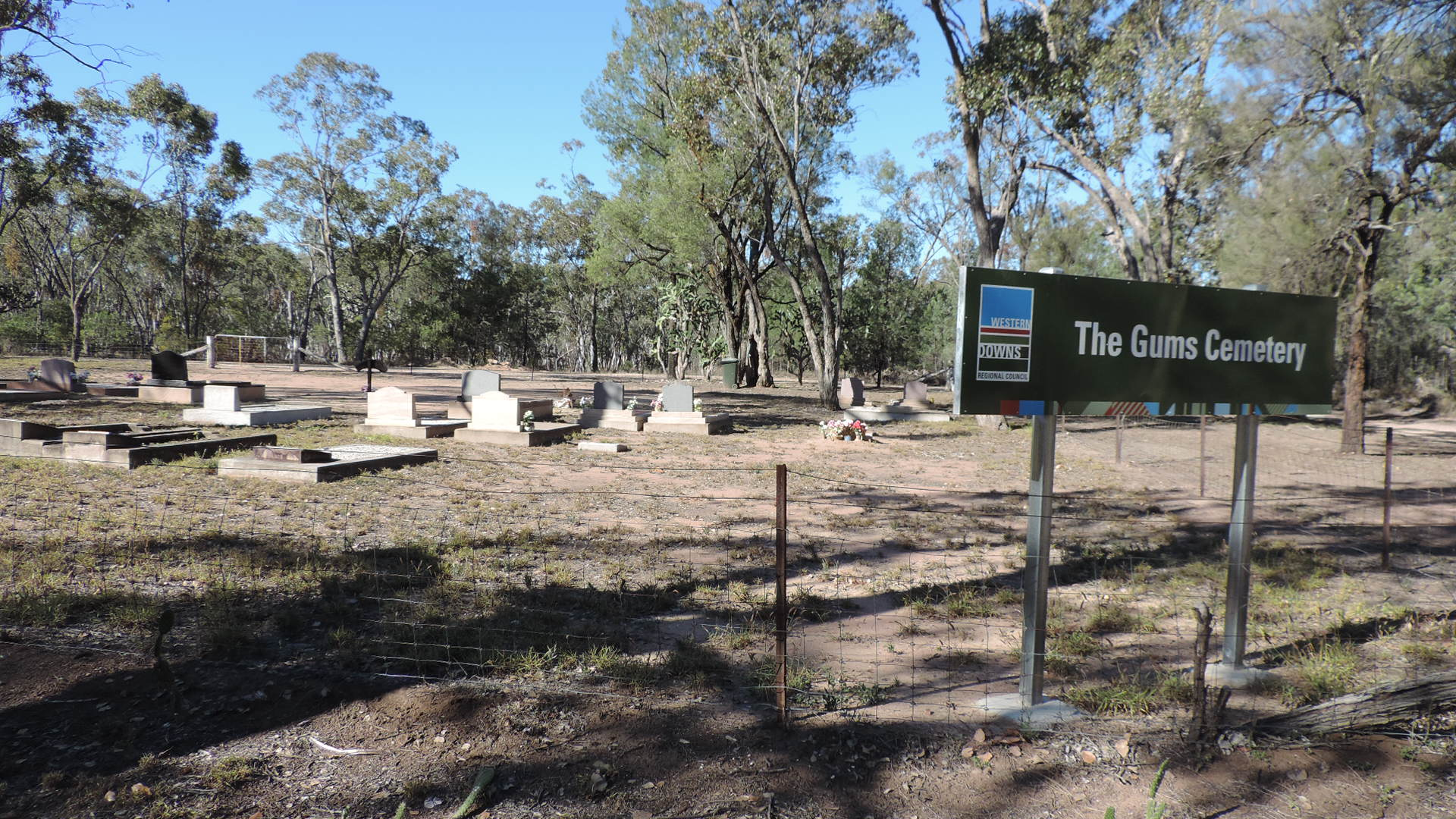
The Gums Cemetery, 2016

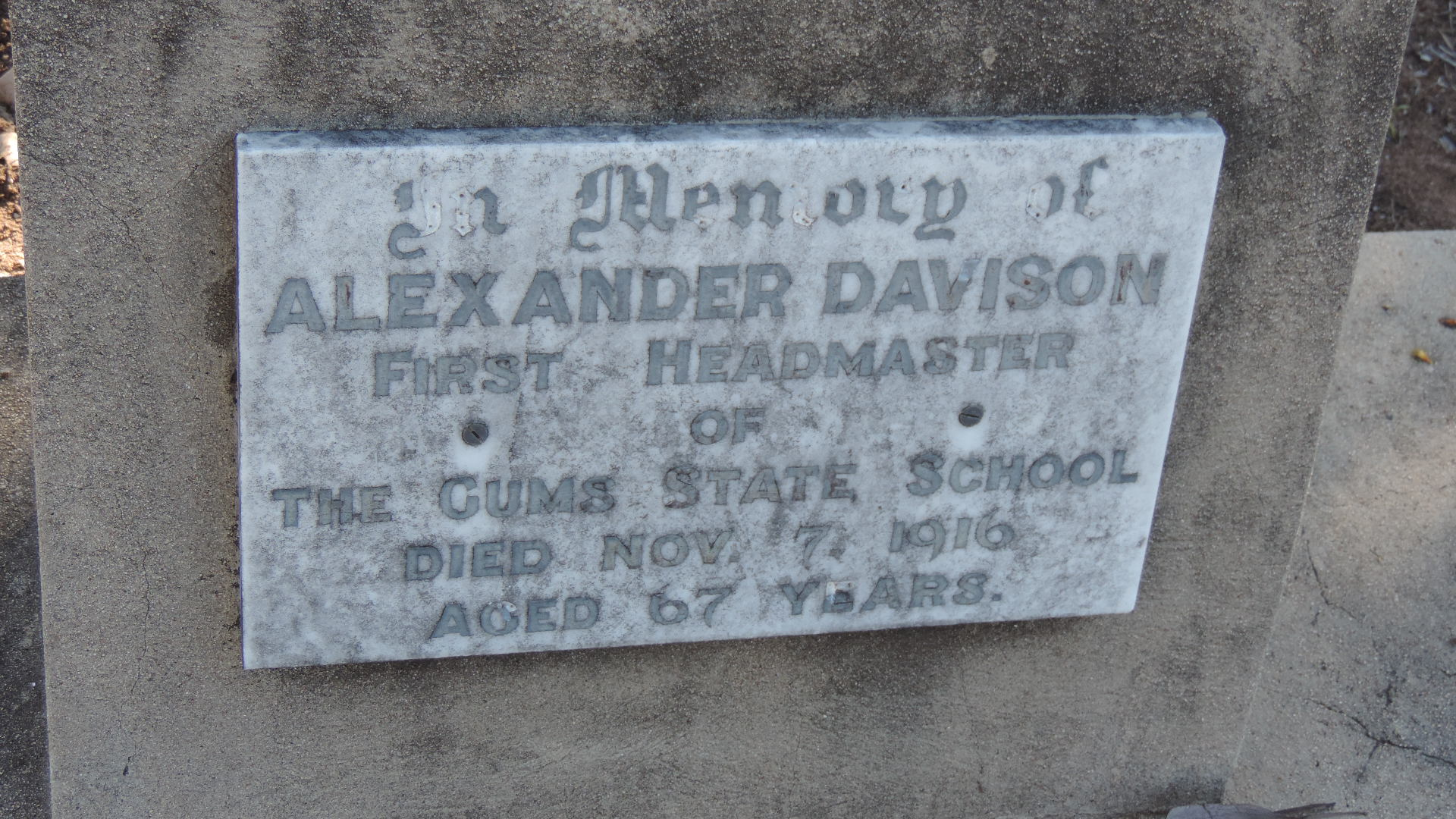
Headstone for Alexander Davison, first headmaster of The Gums State School, 2016

The Gums Cemetery is on a laneway north of the Surat Developmental Road (27.3393°S 150.1960°E). One of the headstones is for the first headmaster of The Gums State School, Alexander Davison who died on 7 November 1916.
