= Erringibba National Park =

National park in Queensland, Australia

- IUCN category II (national park)
- Location within Queensland
- Location: Queensland
- Nearest city: Glenmorgan
- Coordinates: 27°17′25″S 149°42′15″E
- Area: 8.77 km^{2} (3.39 sq mi)
- Established: 1999
- Governing body: Queensland Parks and Wildlife Service

Erringibba is a national park at Glenmorgan in the far west of the Darling Downs region of southern Queensland, Australia, 329 km west of Brisbane. The park was established in 1999 and covers 8.77 km^{2} (3.39 sq mi). The park lies within the catchment area of the Condamine River and the Brigalow Belt South bioregion.

The landscape is flat and vegetated with open-forest dominated by brigalow and belah species common in the area. The park's main aim is to preserve two endangered ecosystems which have been mostly cleared for agriculture. These include an shrubby open forest dominated by Acacia harpophylla and/or Casuarina cristata on Cainozoic clay plains and open forest to woodland of Eucalyptus populnea with Acacia harpophylla and/or Casuarina cristata on Cainozoic clay plains.

A total of four rare of threatened species have been identified in Erringibba.

The average elevation of the terrain is 294 metres.

== See also ==
- Protected areas of Queensland
