= Glen Echo, Queensland =

Glen Echo
- Suburb
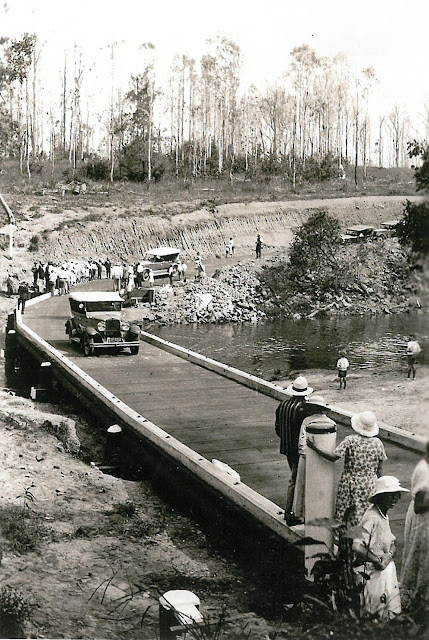
- Sauer's Bridge opening, 1935

- Interactive map of Glen Echo
- Coordinates: 25.9138°S 152.4038°E
- Country: Australia
- State: Queensland
- LGA: Gympie Region
- Location: 48.1 km (29.9 mi) NE of Kilkivan; 64.1 km (39.8 mi) NW of Gympie; 222 km (138 mi) NNW of Brisbane

Government
  - State electorate: Gympie
  - Federal division: Wide Bay

Area
  - Total: 80.9 km^{2} (31.2 sq mi)

Population
  - Total: 49 (2021 census)
  - Density: 0.606/km^{2} (1.569/sq mi)
- Time zone: UTC+10:00 (AEST)
- Postcode: 4570
Suburbs around Glen Echo
Marodian	Mount Urah	Munna Creek
Woolooga	Glen Echo	Miva
Woolooga	Woolooga	Miva

Glen Echo is a rural locality in the Gympie Region, Queensland, Australia. In the 2021 census, Glen Echo had a population of 49 people.

== Geography ==
The watercourse Munna Creek forms part of the western boundary of the locality. Bauple - Woolooga Road forms the south-eastern boundary of the locality.

A section of Glenbar National Park and Miva State Forest 1 are in the north of the locality, with Sugar Loaf Mountain in national park (25.8677°S 152.3980°E), rising to 415 metres (1,362 ft) above sea level. Miva State Forest 2 is in the west of the locality. Apart from these protected areas, the land use is predominantly grazing on native vegetation.

== History ==
Glenecho State School opened on 26 July 1932. It closed in 1967. It was on a 5-acre (2.0 ha) site at 626 Glen Echo Road (25.90653°S 152.41406°E).

A bridge crossing Munna Creek was washed away in 1933, and a temporary crossing provided by Councillor Sauer until a new bridge was built. On Saturday 19 January 1935, a new bridge was opened with 300 people present for the event. The bridge was named Sauer's Bridge as a recognition of Councillor W. Sauer's war services and his efforts to have the bridge constructed. The bridge has since been replaced by a cement bridge (25.92525°S 152.43202°E).

== Demographics ==
In the 2016 census, Glen Echo had a population of 31 people.

In the 2021 census, Glen Echo had a population of 49 people.

== Education ==
There are no schools in Glen Echo. The nearest government primary schools are Woolooga State School in neighbouring Woolooga to the south and Theebine State School in Theebine to the east. The nearest government secondary schools are Kilkivan State School (to Year 10) in Kilkivan to the south-west and James Nash State High School (to Year 12) in Gympie to the south-east. However, for students living in the north of Glen Echo, James Nash State High School may be too distant for a daily commute; the alternatives are distance education and boarding school.
