= Barramornie, Queensland =

Barramornie
- Suburb
- Interactive map of Barramornie
- Coordinates: 27.0725°S 150.0944°E
- Country: Australia
- State: Queensland
- LGA: Western Downs Region
- Location: 52.9 km (32.9 mi) S of Miles; 56.0 km (34.8 mi) NW of Tara; 144 km (89 mi) W of Dalby; 227 km (141 mi) WNW of Toowoomba; 355 km (221 mi) W of Brisbane

Government
  - State electorate: Warrego
  - Federal division: Maranoa

Area
  - Total: 143.9 km^{2} (55.6 sq mi)

Population
  - Total: 15 (2021 census)
  - Density: 0.104/km^{2} (0.270/sq mi)
- Postcode: 4416
Suburbs around Barramornie
Condamine	Condamine	Condamine
Condamine	Barramornie	Condamine
Hannaford	The Gums	The Gums

Barramornie is a rural locality in the Western Downs Region, Queensland, Australia. In the 2021 census, Barramornie had a population of 15 people.

== Geography ==
The Condamine River forms part of the locality's north-west boundary.

The Leichhardt Highway runs along the eastern boundary, entering from The Gums to the south-east and exiting to Condamine to the north-east. The Condamine Meandarra Road (State Route 74) passes through the north-west corner of the locality from neighbouring Condamine through to Condamine.

The land use is predominantly crop growing with some grazing on native vegetation.

== History ==
A rural property called Barramornie appears on a 1940 map occupying the southern half of the present-day locality.

== Demographics ==
In the 2016 census, Barramornie had a population of 19 people.

In the 2021 census, Barramornie had a population of 15 people.

== Education ==
There are no schools in Barramornie. The nearest government primary school is Condamine State School in neighbouring Condamine to the north. The nearest government secondary schools are Miles State High School in Miles to the north and Tara Shire State College in Tara to the south-east. However, students in the south-west of Barramornie may be too distant to attend either of these secondary schools; the alternatives are distance education and boarding school. There is also a Catholic primary school in Tara.
