= Yulabilla, Queensland =

Yulabilla
- Suburb
- Interactive map of Yulabilla
- Coordinates: 27.0263°S 149.7783°E
- Country: Australia
- State: Queensland
- LGA: Western Downs Region
- Location: 44.5 km (27.7 mi) SW of Condamine; 75.6 km (47.0 mi) SW of Miles; 158 km (98 mi) ESE of Roma; 169 km (105 mi) W of Dalby; 379 km (235 mi) WNW of Brisbane

Government
  - State electorate: Warrego
  - Federal division: Maranoa

Area
  - Total: 351.3 km^{2} (135.6 sq mi)

Population
  - Total: 41 (2021 census)
  - Density: 0.1167/km^{2} (0.302/sq mi)
- Time zone: UTC+10:00 (AEST)
- Postcode: 4416
Suburbs around Yulabilla
Moraby	Moraby	Pine Hills
Warkon	Yulabilla	Condamine
Glenmorgan	Glenmorgan	Meandarra

Yulabilla is a rural locality in the Western Downs Region, Queensland, Australia. In the 2021 census, Yulabilla had a population of 41 people.

== Geography ==
The locality is bounded to the south by the Condamine River and from the north to the south-west by Dogwood Creek. Their confluence at the south-west of the locality is the start of the Balonne River.

The land use is predominantly crop growing with some grazing on native vegetation.

== History ==
The locality was officially named and bounded on 25 February 2000. The locality name derives from the parish name, which in turn is believed to be the name of an early settlement or pastoral station which first appears on the 1883 Darling Downs Run Map.

== Demographics ==
In the 2016 census, Yulabilla had a population of 44 people.

In the 2021 census, Yulabilla had a population of 41 people.

== Education ==
There are no schools in Yulabilla. The nearest government primary schools are Condamine State School in neighbouring Condamine to the east and Glenmorgan State School in neighbouring Glenmorgan to the south. There are no nearby secondary schools; the alternatives are distance education and boarding school.
