= Hannaford, Queensland =

Hannaford
- Suburb
- Interactive map of Hannaford
- Coordinates: 27.4272°S 150.0033°E
- Country: Australia
- State: Queensland
- LGA: Western Downs Region
- Location: 45.1 km (28.0 mi) WSW of Tara; 134 km (83 mi) WSW of Dalby; 217 km (135 mi) W of Toowoomba; 344 km (214 mi) W of Brisbane

Government
  - State electorate: Warrego
  - Federal division: Maranoa

Area
  - Total: 1,134.8 km^{2} (438.1 sq mi)

Population
  - Total: 135 (2021 census)
  - Density: 0.1190/km^{2} (0.3081/sq mi)
- Time zone: UTC+10:00 (AEST)
- Postcode: 4406
Suburbs around Hannaford
Condamine	Barramornie	The Gums
Meandarra	Hannaford	The Gums
Inglestone	Southwood	Moonie

Hannaford is a rural locality in the Western Downs Region, Queensland, Australia. In the 2021 census, Hannaford had a population of 135 people.

== Geography ==
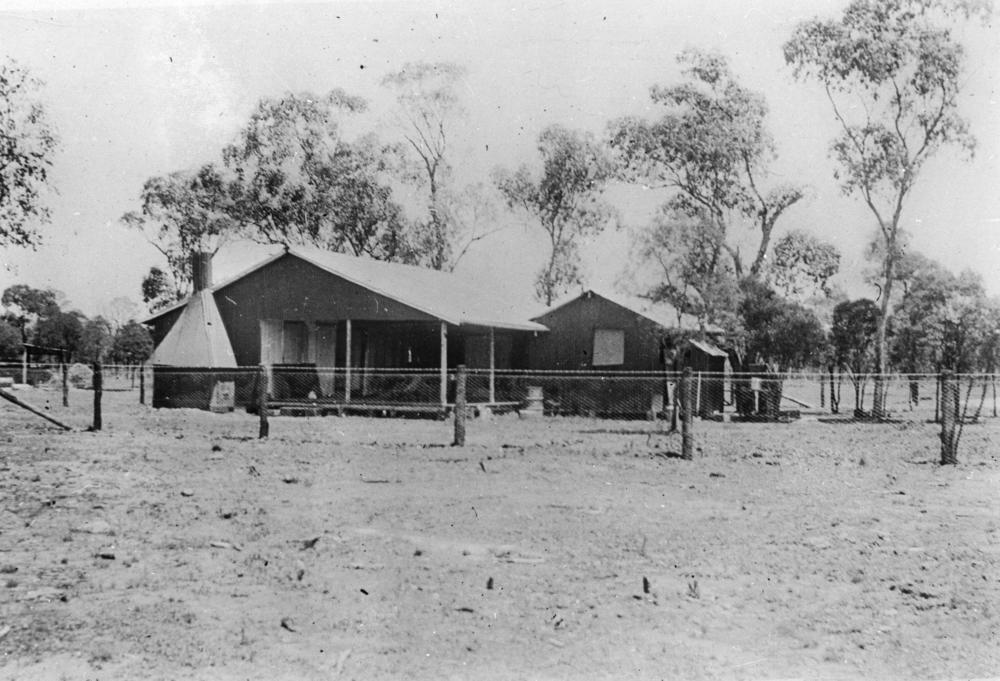
Cadilla homestead, circa 1940

Hannaford is flat land used for agriculture. The Surat Developmental Road passes through the locality from east to west. The Glenmorgan railway line also passes through the locality from east (The Gums) to west (Meandarra); Hannaford railway station (27.3264°S 150.0650°E) serves the locality.

== History ==
Hannaford railway station was named on 14 July 1924 by the Queensland Railways Department taking the name of the parish, which in turn was named after pastoralist Samuel Hannaford, who leased the North Inglestone pastoral run.

Hannaford Provisional School opened on 4 March 1929 but closed on 29 August 1930. It reopened on 17 March 1947 and became Hannaford State School in 1948.

Hannaford Post Office opened around 1934. It remains open as a community postal agent.

== Demographics ==
In the 2016 census, Hannaford had a population of 118 people.

In the 2021 census, Hannaford had a population of 135 people.

== Education ==
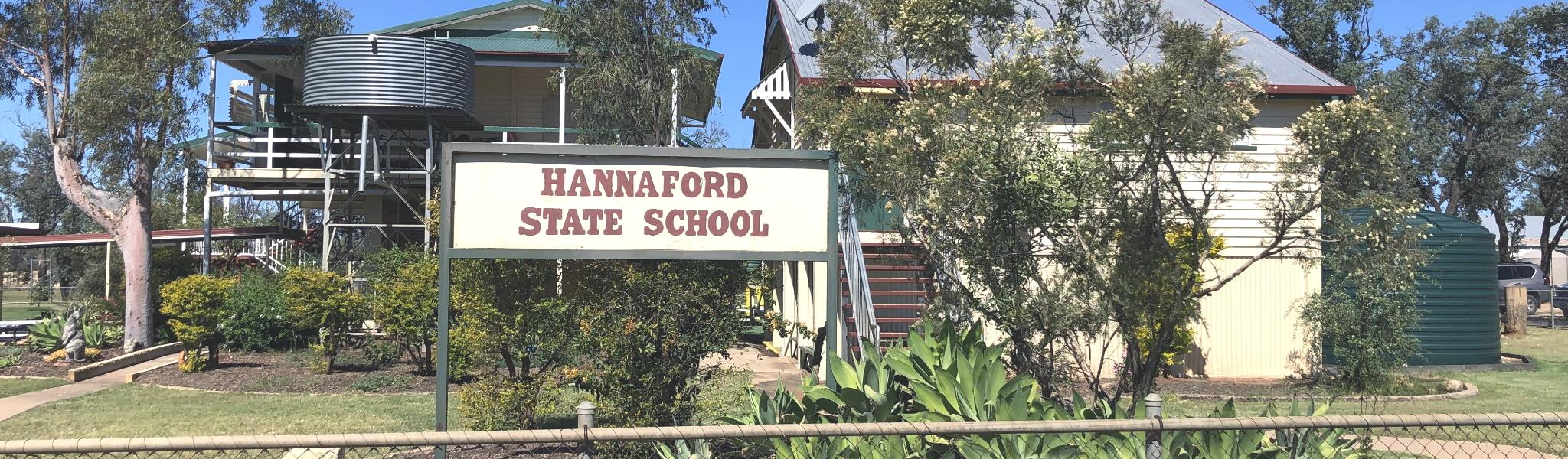
Hannaford State School, circa 2025

Hannaford State School is a government primary (Prep-6) school for boys and girls in Hannaford Road (27.3404°S 150.0607°E). In 2015, the school had an enrolment of 9 students with 2 teachers (1 full-time equivalent) and 4 non-teaching staff (2 full-time equivalent). In 2018, the school had an enrolment of 23 students with 3 teachers (2 full-time equivalent) and 5 non-teaching staff (2 full-time equivalent).

There are no secondary schools in Hannaford. The nearest government secondary school is Tara Shire State College in Tara to the east, but it is a considerable distance for a daily commute and the alternatives would be distance education and boarding school.
