= Pine Hills, Queensland =

Pine Hills
- Suburb
- Interactive map of Pine Hills
- Coordinates: 26.8997°S 149.9491°E
- Country: Australia
- State: Queensland
- LGA: Western Downs Region
- Location: 23.6 km (14.7 mi) W of Condamine; 49.4 km (30.7 mi) SW of Miles; 148 km (92 mi) WNW of Dalby; 231 km (144 mi) WNW of Toowoomba; 446 km (277 mi) WNW of Brisbane

Government
  - State electorate: Warrego
  - Federal division: Maranoa

Area
  - Total: 134.2 km^{2} (51.8 sq mi)

Population
  - Total: 0 (2021 census)
  - Density: 0.000/km^{2} (0.000/sq mi)
- Time zone: UTC+10:00 (AEST)
- Postcode: 4416
Suburbs around Pine Hills
Moraby	Drillham South	Drillham South
Moraby	Pine Hills	Condamine
Yulabilla	Condamine	Condamine

Pine Hills is a rural locality in the Western Downs Region, Queensland, Australia. In the 2021 census, Pine Hills had "no people or a very low population".

== Geography ==
The Roma–Condamine Road enters the locality from the west (Moraby) and exits to the east (Condamine).

Dogwood Creek enters the locality from the north-east (Drillham South / Condamine) and exits to the west (Moraby).

The land use is a mixture of crop growing and grazing on native vegetation.

== Demographics ==
In the 2016 census, Pine Hills had "no people or a very low population".

In the 2021 census, Pine Hills had "no people or a very low population".

== Education ==
There are no schools in Pine Hills. The nearest government primary schools are Condamine State School in neighbouring Condamine to the east and Dulacca State School in Dulacca to the north-west. The nearest government secondary school is Miles State High School in Miles to the north-east. However, some parts of Pine Hills would be too distant to attend this secondary school; the alternatives are distance education and boarding school.
