= Moonie Highway =

Highway in Queensland, Australia

Moonie Highway Queensland
- Moonie Highway (green outlined in black)

General information
- Type: Highway
- Length: 293 km (182 mi)
- Route number(s): State Route 49

Major junctions
- East end: Warrego Highway (State Highway A2), Dalby
- Leichhardt Highway (State Highway A5); Meandarra Talwood Road (State Route 74)
- West end: Carnarvon Highway (State Highway A55), St George

Location(s)
- Major settlements: Moonie, Westmar

Highway system
- Highways in Australia; National Highway • Freeways in Australia; Highways in Queensland

The Moonie Highway is a state highway of Queensland, Australia. Part of State Route 49, it leaves the Warrego Highway at Dalby and runs for over 290 km until it reaches St George. From there, State Route 49 continues west as the Balonne Highway. From Dalby, it continues north-east as the Bunya Highway.

The highway serves agricultural settlements as well as oil and gas fields.

== Route description ==
The Moonie Highway is part of two of the many practicable routes from the south-east of Queensland to the south-east of South Australia. It is also on the shortest route to St George and Cunnamulla from any locality on or near the Queensland coast from Bundaberg to Coolangatta.

=== Dalby to Moonie ===
The highway leaves Dalby via Nicholson and Loudoun Streets. After about 7.8 km it crosses Myall Creek just south of its junction with the Condamine River. After a further 1.7 km it crosses the Condamine. It runs through rich farming land until it reaches the locality of Kumbarilla near the intersection with the Surat Developmental Road. Kumbarilla is located on a ridge (Kumbarilla Ridge) which divides the Surat Basin from the Clarence-Moreton Basin to the east. The road then passes by and through the Kumbarilla State Forest, an area of about 86,000 hectares of native bushland. It then passes through the Waar Waar State Forest and more farmland before reaching the Leichhardt Highway at Moonie.

=== Moonie to St George ===
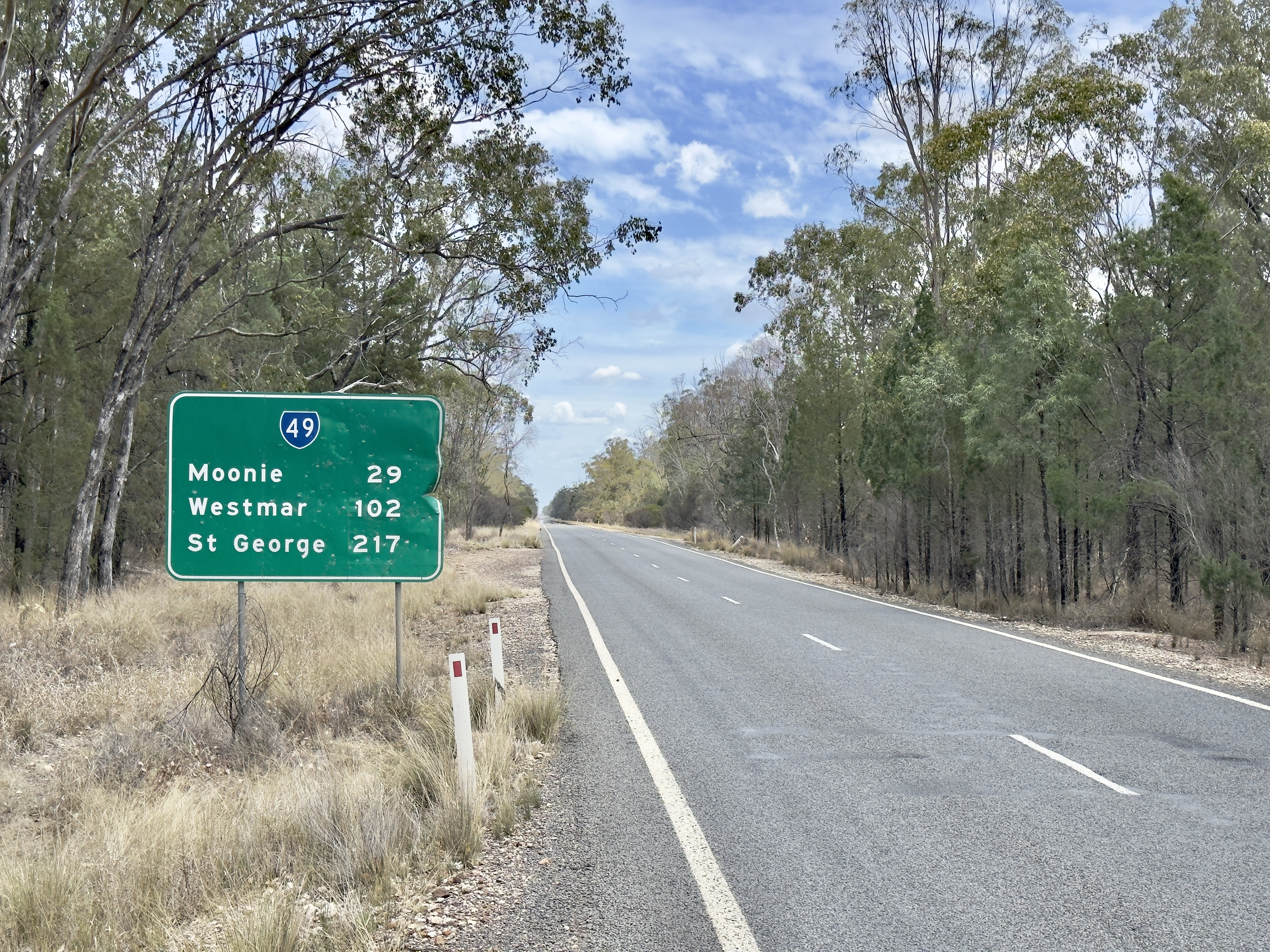
Distance road sign, Moonie to St George

From Moonie the highway passes through more farmland, passing the timbered area of Southwood National Park. It then passes through Currajong State Forest and Kinkora State Forest before reaching Westmar. From Westmar it passes through more farmland, and also Ula Ula State Forest and Alton National Park. It ends at the Carnarvon Highway, about 9.1 km from the centre of St George.

== History ==
The first recorded European settlement in the Moonie district was in about 1849 when land at the head of the Moonie River was formed into a station and named "Weranga". The current locality of Weranga, the Weranga railway station, and the Weranga State Forest are all in the area once occupied by the station. As further stations were formed along the Moonie River a road to access them was developed, generally following the course of the main channel of the river. This road still exists as Old Moonie Road. It runs to the north of and approximately parallel to the Moonie Highway, from Weranga to the Meandarra Talwood Road just north of Westmar. The name Westmar was derived from the first part of the words WESTern and MARanoa.

== Major intersections ==
LGA	Location	km	mi	Destinations	Notes
Western Downs	Dalby	0	0.0	Warrego Highway (State Highway A2) – north–west – Chinchilla / south–east – Oakey	North–eastern end of Moonie Highway (State Route 49)
Western Downs	Kumbarilla	48.1	29.9	Surat Developmental Road (State Route 87) – west – Surat	
Western Downs	Moonie	114	71	Leichhardt Highway (State Highway A5) – north–west – The Gums / south – Goondiwindi	
Western Downs	Westmar	184	114	Meandarra–Talwood Road (State Route 74) – north – Meandarra / south – Bungunya	
Balonne	St George	293	182	Carnarvon Highway (State Highway A55) – north–east – Surat / south–west – St George CBD	South–western end of Moonie Highway
1.000 mi = 1.609 km; 1.000 km = 0.621 mi

== See also ==
- Highways in Australia
- List of highways in Queensland
- I've Been Everywhere - a song whose Australian version mentions Kumbarilla
- Glenmorgan railway line- which has stations at Kumbarilla and Weranga
