= Alton National Park =

National park in Australia

- IUCN category II (national park)
- Location within Queensland
- Location: Queensland
- Coordinates: 27°59′23″S 149°18′48″E
- Area: 5.58 km^{2} (2.15 sq mi)
- Established: 1973
- Governing body: Queensland Parks and Wildlife Service

Alton is a national park in the Balonne Shire local government area of South West Queensland, Australia.

== Geography ==
Alton National Park is 371 km west of Brisbane and 75 km east of St George, adjacent to Moonie Highway. It covers 5.58 km^{2} (2.15 sq mi) of land within the Brigalow Belt South bioregion. The park is divided by the Moonie Highway and surrounded by grazing properties. The average elevation of the terrain is 225 metres.

== History ==
Alton National Park was declared in 1973. The area was preserved because it contains vegetation of limited occurrence, interesting plant species and attractive wildflowers. A total of four rare or threatened species have been identified within Alton. It is also home to 191 different species of animals.

== Amenities ==
Alton has tourist potential, although at the moment visitors must be self-reliant. The park has no facilities for campers.

== See also ==
- Protected areas of Queensland
