= Shell Energy Australia =

Energy company

- Formerly: ERM Power
- Company type: Subsidiary
- Industry: Energy
- Founded: 1980; 45 years ago
- Founder: Trevor St Baker
- Headquarters: Brisbane, Queensland, Australia
- Area served: Australia
- Key people: Greg Joiner (CEO)
- Number of employees: 350
- Parent: Shell Australia
- Website: shellenergy.com.au

Shell Energy Australia provides gas, electricity, environmental products and energy productivity services to commercial and industrial customers.

== History ==
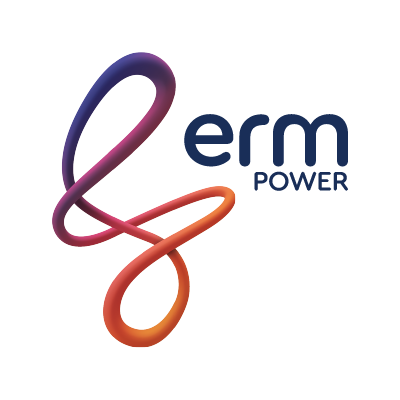
Former ERM Power logo

ERM Power was founded by Trevor St Baker as a specialist Australian energy advisory firm in 1980. The company transformed into a power development company in the mid-1990s to capture opportunities arising from the deregulation of the Australian electricity industry. In 2007 the company diversified into electricity retailing in response to further privatisation and vertical integration of the Australian energy industry. ERM Power listed on the Australian Securities Exchange on 10 December 2010. It launched the ERM Business Energy brand in 2012, commenced retailing to the small and medium enterprise (SME) market in 2013 and entered the U.S. retail electricity market by acquiring Source Power & Gas headquartered in Texas in 2015.

Shell Australia acquired ERM Power in November 2019 with the company delisted from the ASX. ERM Power was rebranded as Shell Energy in February 2021.

== Core business ==
Shell Energy retails electricity to large commercial and industrial energy users in Australia (except for Northern Territory) and gas to commercial and industrial energy users in New South Wales and Victoria. Shell Energy owns two gas-fired peaking power stations in Darling Downs, Queensland, and Neerabup, Western Australia, and is developing a 120-megawatt solar energy development in Queensland.

In February 2022 Shell Energy acquired residential energy retailer Powershop Australia.

== Projects in development ==
Gangarri Solar Development, a 120-megawatt solar energy development, located in inland Queensland. Gangarri will generate solar power from about 330,000 photovoltaic panels that turn sunlight into electricity – enough to run 50,000 homes. It will reduce emissions by around 300,000 tonnes of carbon dioxide per annum.

In January 2023 Shell Energy acquired the development rights for a 500MW/1000MWh Battery Energy Storage System project, located within the former Wallerawang Power Station site near Lithgow.

In October 2022 the Australian Renewable Energy Agency (ARENA) announced $9.1 million in funding to Shell Energy to implement load control across at least 40 commercial and industrial customer sites to demonstrate flexible demand capacity.

In October 2022 Shell Energy announced it would jointly develop one of the largest energy storage projects in NSW, partnering with AMPYR Australia on a 500MW/1000MWh battery located in Wellington.

Also in October 2022, Shell Energy entered into a 50/50 joint partnership with Foresight Group to acquire Kondinin Energy. This acquisition was Shell’s first Western Australian renewables development – and first Western Australian wind project. The Kondinin Energy project is located approximately 245 km east of Perth and comprises various stages of 370MW of developments across wind, solar and battery energy storage system assets.

In May 2021 the Government of New South Wales announced that Shell Energy and Edify Energy had been awarded a 10-year contract, including a 60MW/120MWh retail contract coupled with a 100-megawatt Battery Energy Storage System (BESS). The project has been dubbed the 'Riverina Energy Storage System (RESS)' and will be built alongside Edify's 333MW Darlington Point Solar Farm. The NSW Government noted that the RESS would help to mitigate the region's energy supply concerns due to the planned closure of the coal-powered Liddell Power Station in 2023.

== Generation ==
Shell Energy operates Oakey Power Station, a 332-megawatt peaking power station located at Oakey in Queensland, and Neerabup Power Station, a 330-megawatt peaking power station in Western Australia which opened in 2009 at a cost of $435 million.

== Net-zero ambitions ==
Shell's target is to become a net zero emissions energy business by 2050, in step with society's progress in achieving the goal of the UN Paris Agreement on climate change. As part of this commitment, ERM Power secured funding from the Australian Renewable Energy Agency (ARENA) to help manufacturing businesses in Queensland understand what is required to make the switch to clean energy. Its $600,000 programme included $250,000 in ARENA funding. In October 2022, ARENA announced $9.1 million in funding to Shell Energy as part of the $31.6 million ‘Commercialising Smart Energy Hubs’ project. Shell Energy will implement load control across at least 40 commercial and industrial sites in Queensland, New South Wales and Victoria to demonstrate an estimated 21.5 MW of flexible demand capacity.
