= Drillham South, Queensland =

Drillham South
- Suburb
- Interactive map of Drillham South
- Coordinates: 26.7916°S 149.9908°E
- Country: Australia
- State: Queensland
- LGA: Western Downs Region
- Location: 24.7 km (15.3 mi) SW of Miles; 151 km (94 mi) NW of Dalby; 234 km (145 mi) NW of Toowoomba; 362 km (225 mi) WNW of Brisbane

Government
  - State electorate: Warrego
  - Federal division: Maranoa

Area
  - Total: 337.0 km^{2} (130.1 sq mi)

Population
  - Total: 73 (2021 census)
  - Density: 0.2166/km^{2} (0.561/sq mi)
- Time zone: UTC+10:00 (AEST)
- Postcode: 4424
Suburbs around Drillham South
Drillham	Drillham	Miles
Dulacca	Drillham South	Miles
Moraby	Pine Hills	Condamine

Drillham South is a rural locality in the Western Downs Region, Queensland, Australia. In the 2021 census, Drillham South had a population of 73 people.

== Geography ==
The land use is predominantly grazing on native vegetation with some crop growing.

== Demographics ==
In the 2016 census, Drillham South had a population of 67 people.

In the 2021 census, Drillham South had a population of 73 people.

== Education ==
There are no schools in Drillham South. The nearest government primary schools are:

- Drillham State School in neighbouring Drillham to the north
- Miles State School in neighbouring Miles to the north-east
- Condamine State School in neighbouring Condamine to the south-east
- Dulacca State School in neighbouring Dulacca to the north-west

The nearest government secondary school is Miles State High School, also in Miles.
