= Inglestone, Queensland =

Inglestone
- Suburb
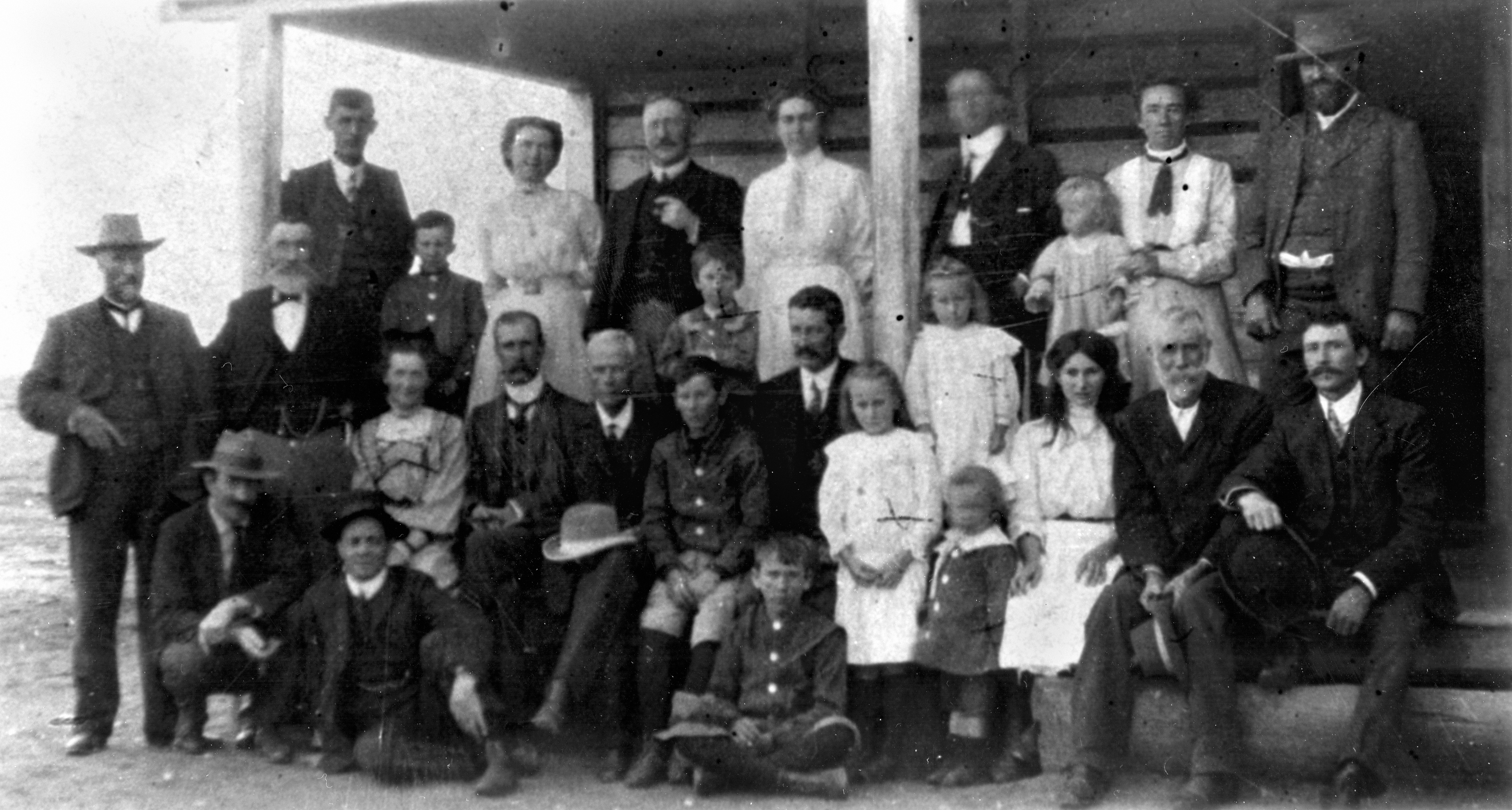
- Meacle family on the verandah of Inglestone Homestead

- Interactive map of Inglestone
- Coordinates: 27.615°S 149.8022°E
- Country: Australia
- State: Queensland
- LGA: Western Downs Region
- Location: 31.2 km (19.4 mi) SSW of Meandarra; 83.5 km (51.9 mi) WSW of Tara; 173 km (107 mi) WSW of Dalby; 255 km (158 mi) W of Toowoomba; 383 km (238 mi) W of Brisbane

Government
  - State electorate: Warrego
  - Federal division: Maranoa

Area
  - Total: 708.2 km^{2} (273.4 sq mi)

Population
  - Total: 63 (2021 census)
  - Density: 0.0890/km^{2} (0.2304/sq mi)
- Time zone: UTC+10:00 (AEST)
- Postcode: 4422
Suburbs around Inglestone
Coomrith	Meandarra	Hannaford
Coomrith	Inglestone	Hannaford
Flinton	Westmar	Southwood

Inglestone is a locality in the Western Downs Region, Queensland, Australia. In the 2021 census, Inglestone had a population of 63 people.

== Geography ==
The Meandarra Talwood Road (State Route 74) runs through from north to south.

== History ==
The locality takes its name from early pastoral run in the district, which was later resumed for close settlement. Some holders of the Ingleston run were Samuel Brown, Samuel Hannaford and Mr Munro (1900) who brought in R. Meacle as manager.

Inglestone Provisional School opened on 8 April 1918 and closed 14 March 1924 due to low enrolment numbers.

== Demographics ==
In the 2016 census, Inglestone had a population of 75 people.

In the 2021 census, Inglestone had a population of 63 people.

== Education ==
There are no schools in Inglestone. The nearest government primary schools are Meandarra State School in neighbouring Meandarra to the north, Hannaford State School in neighbouring Hannaford to the north-west, and Westmar State School in neighbouring Westmar to the south. There are no secondary schools in Inglestone, nor nearby. The alternatives are distance education and boarding school.
