= Mount Urah, Queensland =

Mount Urah
- Suburb
- Interactive map of Mount Urah
- Coordinates: 25.8055°S 152.4152°E
- Country: Australia
- State: Queensland
- LGA: Fraser Coast Region
- Location: 52.9 km (32.9 mi) SW of Maryborough; 61.9 km (38.5 mi) NNW of Gympie; 83.0 km (51.6 mi) SW of Hervey Bay; 241 km (150 mi) N of Brisbane

Government
  - State electorate: Maryborough
  - Federal division: Wide Bay

Area
  - Total: 161.8 km^{2} (62.5 sq mi)

Population
  - Total: 49 (2021 census)
  - Density: 0.303/km^{2} (0.784/sq mi)
- Time zone: UTC+10:00 (AEST)
- Postcode: 4650
Suburbs around Mount Urah
| Glenbar | St Mary | Netherby |
| Glenbar | Mount Urah | Gundiah |
| Marodian | Glen Echo | Munna Creek |

Mount Urah is a rural locality in the Fraser Coast Region, Queensland, Australia. In the 2021 census, Mount Urah had a population of 49 people.

== Geography ==
The Mary River forms most of the eastern boundary, while Ooramera Creek forms the north-eastern boundary as it flows to join the Mary.

Mount Urah is in the south-west of the locality (25.8306°S 152.3512°E) rising to 606 metres (1,988 ft) above sea level.

Glenbar National Park is in the west of the locality with four sections of Glenbar State Forest throughout the locality. Apart from these protected areas, the predominant land use is grazing on native vegetation.

== History ==
The locality takes its name from the mountain in the west of the locality. The mountain takes its name from the Kabi language word euro meaning a species of scrub vine or yurru meaning Flagellaria indica.

Mount Uruah Provisional School opened on 31 October 1909. In 1913, the name was changed to Mount Urah and it became Mount Urah State School. It closed in early 1921 due to low student numbers, but reopened shortly after as a half-time school in conjunction with Deborah State School (meaning the two schools shared a single teacher). It closed permanently on 1 April 1927.

== Demographics ==
In the 2016 census, Mount Urah had a population of 21 people.

In the 2021 census, Mount Urah had a population of 49 people.

== Education ==
There are no schools in Mount Urah. The nearest government primary school is Gundiah State School in neighbouring Gundiah to the east and Tiaro State School in Tiaro to the north-east.

The nearest government secondary schools are Maryborough State High School in Maryborough to the north and James Nash State High School in Gympie to the south. However, some parts of Mount Urah are quite distant from these two schools with the alternatives being distance education and boarding schools.
