= Roma to Brisbane Pipeline =

Natural gas pipeline in Queensland, Australia

Location
- Country: Australia
- State: Queensland
- Direction: East-West
- Start: Wallumbilla, Queensland
- To: Brisbane

General information
- Type: Natural gas
- Owner: APA Group
- Operator: APA Group
- Contractors: Thiess
- Commissioned: 1969

Technical information
- Length: 438 km (272 mi)

The Roma to Brisbane Pipeline or Wallumbilla to Brisbane Pipeline is a natural gas pipeline in Queensland, Australia. It is one of five major natural gas pipelines in the state. It is the oldest operating natural gas pipeline in Australia. Operations began in March 1969. An opening ceremony was attended by State Premier Joh Bjelke-Petersen.

The pipeline was constructed by Thiess. Reserves discovered by 1964 justified the need for a pipeline to markets.

The pipeline moves gas from the fields at Wallumbilla to markets in Brisbane and regional networks via a 438 kilometre long network. Both conventional and coal seam gas are transported.

Gas flow is bi-directional. The Oakey Power Station was strategically built at Oakey on the pipeline to help ensure supply.

The pipeline is owned by APA Group and follows regulations set out by the Australian Energy Regulator.
