= Energy Policy Institute of Australia =

Australian think tank

The Energy Policy Institute of Australia is an apolitical, not-for-profit energy policy body. It was created as the Energy Alliance of Australia in 1999 to collaborate with the Australian Government on the development of energy export markets. The Institute advocates technology neutrality as a core principle of energy policy. The Institute adopted the name Energy Policy Institute of Australia in 2011.

For ten years from 2008, the Institute convened an annual forum called the Energy State of the Nation but this has been superseded by more frequent events as policy issues have arisen. The Institute is governed by a board of directors who represent a diverse mix of corporate entities with interests in Australia's energy sector.

== History ==
The Institute was established in 1999 as the Energy Alliance of Australia, in consultation with the Australian Government's Department of Resources, Energy and Tourism. It was designed as a vehicle for Australia's energy sector to liaise with the Asia Pacific Energy Cooperation (APEC) organisation. The Energy Alliance of Australia initiated the establishment of APGAS in 2005 as a forum for APEC Member States' energy policymakers, industry regulators, oil and gas suppliers and consumers, traders and pipeline and ship owners and operators. After three years APGAS closed, having fulfilled its purpose of accelerating cross-border gas trade.

== Philosophy ==
The Institute aims to foster an attractive and secure energy investment climate in Australia, and promote an industry which is internationally competitive. It supports free markets and a "resilient" energy supply system, supported by integrated government policy. The Institute accepts "that the world must transition to a low-carbon society as quickly as it can afford to do so."

== Activity ==
The Institute conducts research into policy, technology, economics, trade and investment relevant to the energy sector. The research is disseminated through the publication of policy papers, presentation of briefings and facilitation of workshops. It provides "a trusted communications channel between government and the private sector" and represents the Australian industry to the APEC Energy Working Group and similar international bodies. The Institute is affiliated with the US Energy Association of Washington DC.

In 2016, the Institute commenced to publish a continually updated compendium of its policy papers. The compendium lists the key points of all past papers and is hyperlinked to each of the original papers.

In August 2016, the Institute published An Australian Energy Vision and Framework for Energy Policy Priorities.

In March 2017, the EPIA forwarded its final submission to the Finkel Review on Security of the NEM, and then in June 2017, the Institute published its position after the release of the Finkel Report.

In May 2020, the EPIA released its Key Goals and Principles of a Post-COVID-19 National Energy Plan.

The EPIA runs a series of Executive Briefings for its members on topical issues with an important bearing on the development of energy policy in Australia. All events are listed on the Institute's website.

== Governance ==
The EPIA's members meet once a year, the board meets three times a year, and an Executive Committee (elected by the Board) meets monthly. Each corporate member has the right to appoint a director to the board.

The Executive Director is Robert Pritchard. Robert has over 40 years’ experience as a lawyer and adviser to industry, governments and organisations on energy projects and policies, both in Australia and overseas, and as a director of companies in the energy sector. This includes serving as Managing Director of ResourcesLaw International, Chairman of the St Baker Energy Innovation Fund and SMR Nuclear Technology. Robert was the first Chairman of the Energy Law Section of the International Bar Association and served for nine years on the Finance Committee of the World Energy Council.

Board members as of July 2020 are listed below:

Surname	First name	Current associations
McClelland	Daniel	Alinta Energy
O'Grady	Tim	Origin Energy
Pritchard	Robert	ResourcesLaw International, St Baker Energy Innovation Fund, SMR Nuclear Technology
St Baker AO	Trevor	St Baker Energy Innovation Fund, SMR Nuclear Technology, Tritium, Fast Cities Australia
Townsend	Bill	INPEX Australia
Wilson	Stephen	University of Queensland
