= Meandarra =

- Town
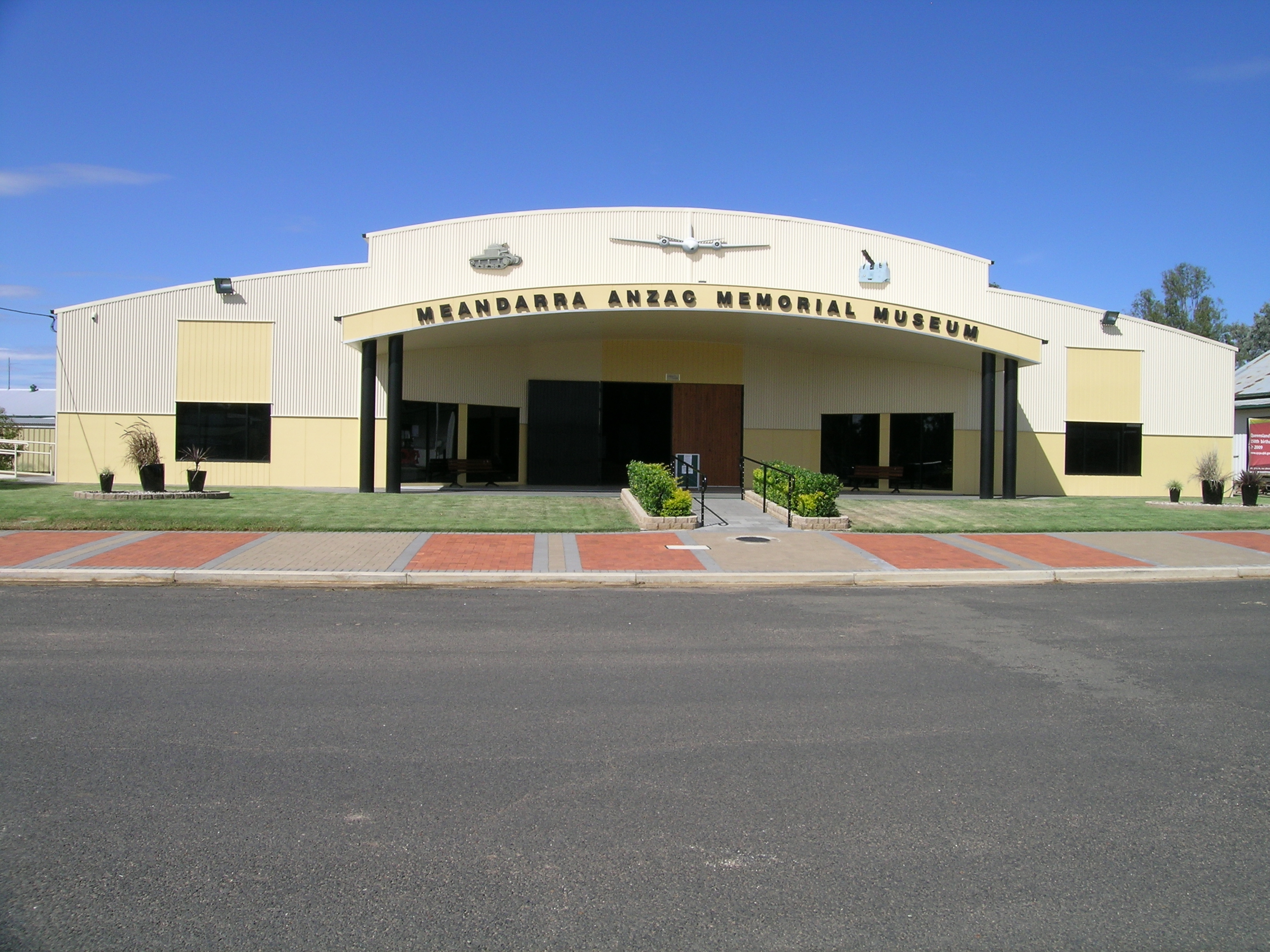
- Meandarra ANZAC Memorial Museum, 2010

- Interactive map of Meandarra
- Coordinates: 27.3238°S 149.8805°E
- Country: Australia
- State: Queensland
- LGA: Western Downs Region
- Location: 63.8 km (39.6 mi) W of Tara; 85.6 km (53.2 mi) SSW of Miles; 154 km (96 mi) W of Dalby; 236 km (147 mi) W of Toowoomba; 364 km (226 mi) W of Brisbane

Government
  - State electorate: Warrego
  - Federal division: Maranoa

Area
  - Total: 806.4 km^{2} (311.4 sq mi)

Population
  - Total: 244 (2021 census)
  - Density: 0.3026/km^{2} (0.7837/sq mi)
- Time zone: UTC+10:00 (AEST)
- Postcode: 4422
Localities around Meandarra
Glenmorgan	Yulabilla	Condamine
Glenmorgan	Meandarra	Hannaford
Coomrith	Inglestone	Hannaford

Meandarra is a rural town and locality in the Western Downs Region, Queensland, Australia. In the 2021 census, the locality of Meandarra had a population of 244 people.

== Geography ==
The town is located on Brigalow Creek, 361 kilometres (224 mi) west of the state capital, Brisbane. The former town of Undulla is in the north-east of the locality (27.1847°S 149.9475°E).

The Glenmorgan railway line enters the locality from the east and terminates at the Meandarra railway station immediately north of the town (27.3219°S 149.8861°E).

== History ==
First surveyed in 1912 by surveyor John Daveney Steele, the town derived its name from a pastoral run first used by pastoralist Archibald Meston on 16 October 1867.

Cooroorah Provisional School opened in 1913 and closed in 1919. After a temporary closure in 1915, it closed permanently 1919. Its location was "via Meandarra".

Meandarra State School opened on 27 September 1915.

Kinkabilla Provisional School opened in 1921 and closed circa 1934. Its location was "via Meandarra".

Meandarra Post Office opened on 1 January 1928 (a receiving office was open from 1910 until 1918).

On 21 June 1953, St Margaret Mary Catholic Church was officially opened and dedicated by the Vicar Capitular of Roman Catholic Diocese of Toowoomba Michael Morrissey McKenna. It was the first church in Meandarra.

St Augustine's Anglican Church opened in 1955.

The Meandarra Public Library building opened in 1993.

Meandarra Assembly of God Church was established in 1995. It later renamed itself as the Country Hope Church.

The Meandarra ANZAC Memorial Museum was opened in 2009.

The Glenmorgan railway line was closed beyond Meandarra to Block Trains on 26 June 2013, making Meandarra the terminus. the line beyond Meandarra is "booked out of use" as of 2022

== Demographics ==
In the 2006 census, the locality of Meandarra and the surrounding area had a population of 341 people.

In the 2016 census, the locality of Meandarra had a population of 262 people.

In the 2021 census, the locality of Meandarra had a population of 244 people.

== Education ==
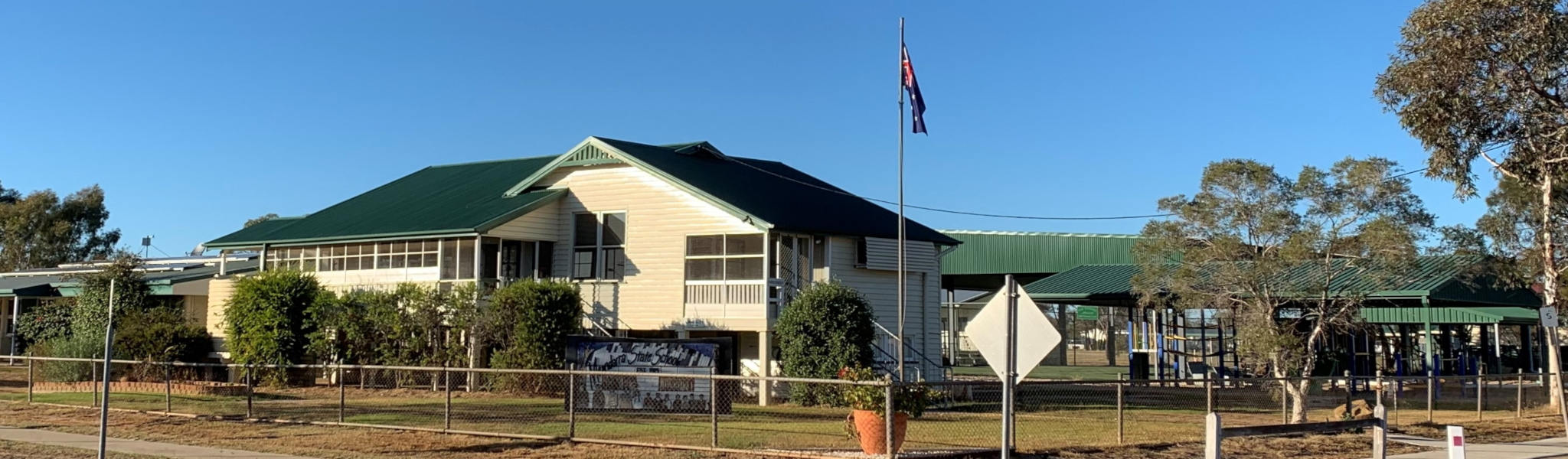
Meandarra State School, 2025

Meandarra State School is a government primary (Prep-6) school for boys and girls in Sara Street (27.3240°S 149.8822°E). In 2016, the school had an enrolment of 37 students with 4 teachers (3 full-time equivalent) and 5 non-teaching staff (3 full-time equivalent). In 2018, the school had an enrolment of 41 students with 5 teachers (3 full-time equivalent) and 6 non-teaching staff (3 full-time equivalent).

There are no secondary schools in Meandarra. The nearest government secondary school is Tara Shire State College in Tara to the east, but it is a considerable distance for a daily commute and other options would be distance education or boarding school.

== Amenities ==
The Western Downs Regional Council operates the Meandarra Library on Sara Street.

St Augustine's Anglican Church is on the north-west corner of Sara Street and Maude Street (27.3254°S 149.8814°E).

St Margaret Mary Catholic Church is at 16 Walton Street (27.3230°S 149.8790°E). It is part of the St Mary of the Angels' Parish of Tara.

The Country Hope Church (also known as the Meandarra Assembly of God Church) is on the north-west corner of Sara Street and Gibson Street (27.3262°S 149.8808°E).

The Meandarra/Glenmorgan Lutheran congregation holds their services in the Glenmorgan Community Church.

The Royal Hotel operates on Sara Street.

== Attractions ==
Meandarra ANZAC Memorial Museum is in Sara Street (27.3229°S 149.8827°E). It contains a large collection of ANZAC memorabilia including a Canberra bomber and a German U-boat engine.
