= Oakey Power Station =

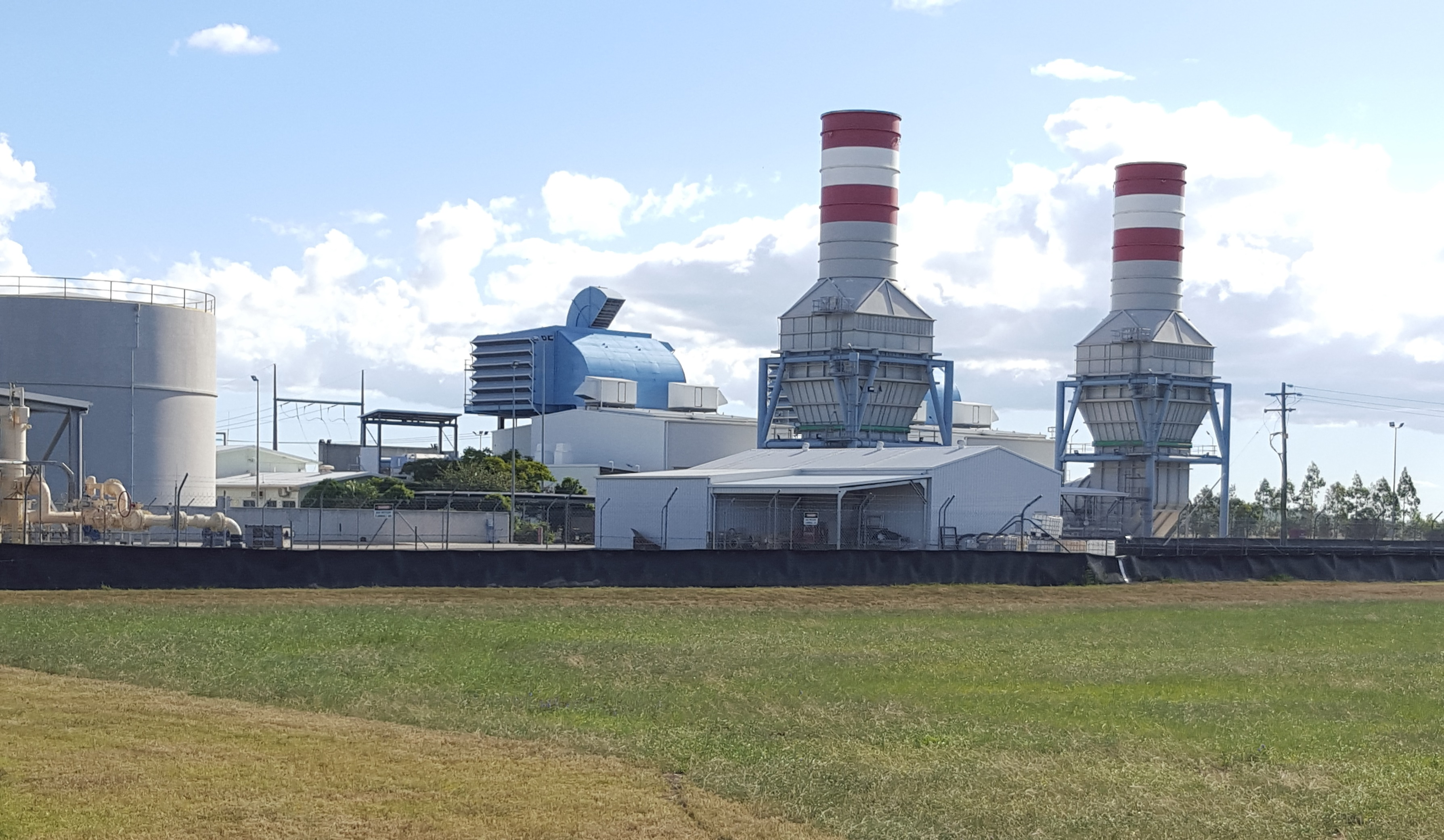
- Country: Australia
- Location: Queensland
- Coordinates: 27°25′07″S 151°40′48″E
- Status: Operational
- Commission date: December 1999
- Owner: Shell Energy Australia

Thermal power station
- Primary fuel: Natural gas

Power generation
- Units operational: 2
- Nameplate capacity: 282 MW

External links
- Commons: Related media on Commons

The Oakey Power Station is a 282 MW power station located at Oakey on the Darling Downs in southern Queensland, adjacent to the Roma to Brisbane Pipeline. The station is an open-cycle, dual liquid/gas-fired power station that typically operates during times of peak electricity demand when Queensland's power needs are greatest. Shell Energy Australia (formerly ERM Power) led the development of Oakey with commissioning occurring safely and on time in December 1999. Shell Energy Australia owns 100% of Oakey and also operates and financially manages the power station.

== See also ==
- List of fuel oil power stations
- List of power stations in Australia
