= Moonie River =

River in Queensland and New South Wales, Australia

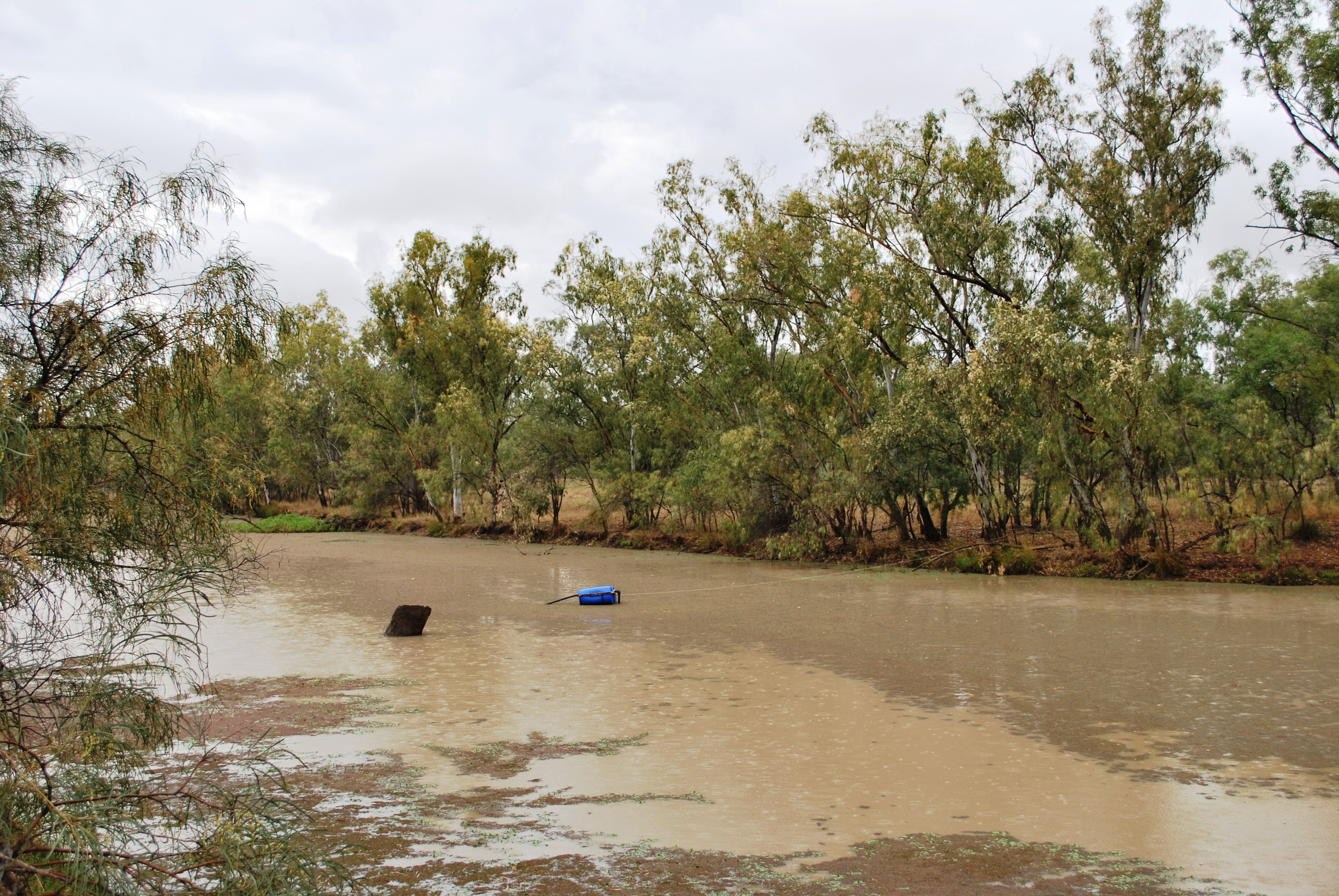
- Moonie River at Nindigully

- Location of the Moonie River mouth in New South Wales

Location
- Country: Australia
- States: Queensland, New South Wales
- Region: Southern Downs, Orana

Physical characteristics
- Source: Braemar State Forest,
  - location: near Tara, Queensland
  - coordinates: 27°19′59″S 150°43′32″E
  - elevation: 347 m (1,138 ft)
- Mouth: confluence with the Barwon River
  - location: near Mogil Mogil, north of Collarenebri New South Wales
  - coordinates: 29°18′46″S 148°42′43″E
  - elevation: 149 m (489 ft)
- Length: 542 km (337 mi)
- Basin size: 14,812 km^{2} (5,719 sq mi)
- Discharge
  - average: 6 m^{3}/s (210 cu ft/s)

Basin features
- River system: Barwon River catchment, Murray–Darling basin
- Reservoir: Thallon Weir

The Moonie River (Mooni River) is a river in Shire of Balonne, Queensland and Walgett Shire, New South Wales, both in Australia. It is a perennial river of the Barwon catchment within the Murray–Darling basin.

== Name ==
The river was named Mooni by explorer and surveyor Thomas Mitchell on 9 November 1846 but the origins of the name are unknown. In New South Wales, the river is officially known as Mooni River, but common usage uses the same spelling as in Queensland where most of the river is located. The sign erected by Walgett Shire Council at Gundablouie Bridge on Gundabloui Road also uses the common spelling Moonie River.

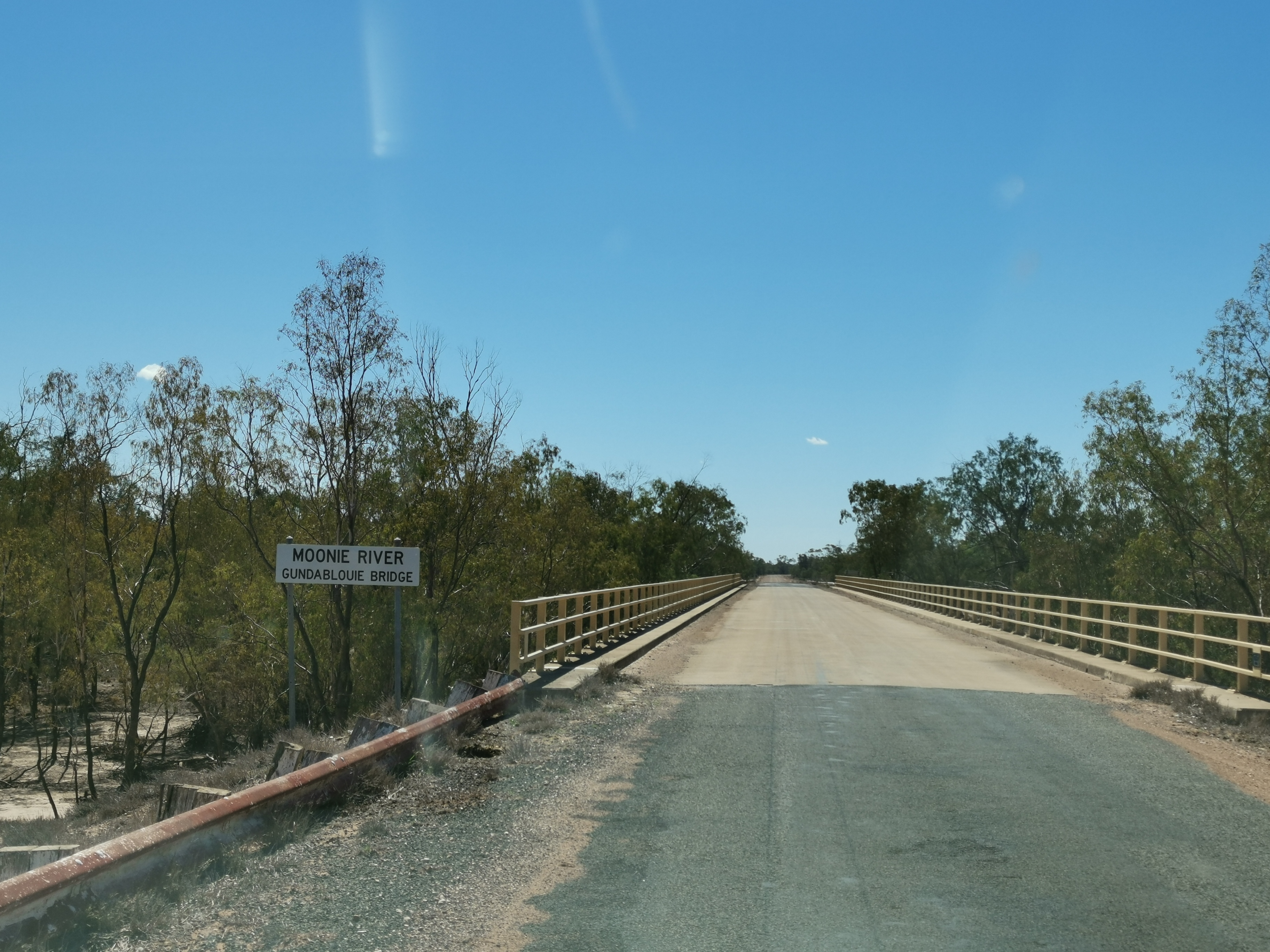
Bridge over Moonie River and one of the few signposts in NSW showing the river's name

== History ==
Yuwaalaraay (also known as Yuwalyai, Euahlayi, Yuwaaliyaay, Gamilaraay, Kamilaroi, Yuwaaliyaayi) is an Australian Aboriginal language spoken on Yuwaalaraay country. The Yuwaalaraay language region includes the landscape within the local government boundaries of the Shire of Balonne, including the town of Dirranbandi as well as the border town of Hebel extending to Walgett and Collarenebri in New South Wales.

== Course and features ==
The rivers rises south west of Dalby, near Braemar State Forest, south-east of Tara in Queensland, and flows generally to the south-west, joined by thirteen minor tributaries, before reaching its confluence with the Barwon River, before Mogil Mogil farm, north of the village of Collarenebri, New South Wales, descending 198 metres (650 ft) over its 542-kilometre (337 mi) course. The catchment area has no major towns and is extremely flat. The Moonie River is impounded by Thallon Weir, with a capacity of 185 megalitres (6.5×10^{6} cu ft).

The river flows through the towns of the Nindigully, Flinton and just to the west of Thallon. Both the Moonie Highway and Carnarvon Highway cross the river. In New South Wales, only one public road crosses the river : Gundabloui Road crosses the river near Goondoobluie farm in Collarenbri, about 50 km north of the village.

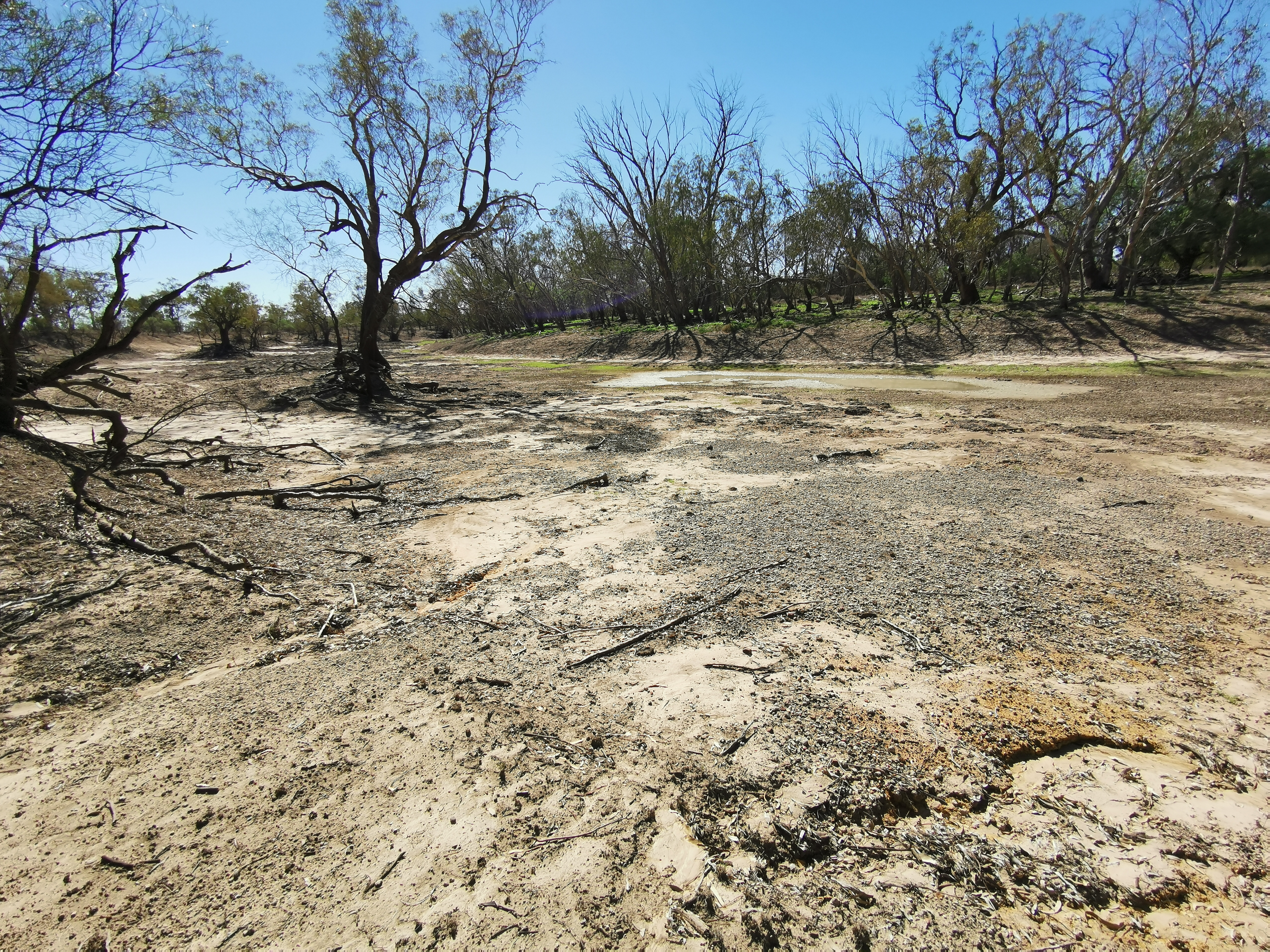
Moonie River was almost dry at this location near Gundabloui Road in Collarenebri, about 41 km north of the village, in April 2019

== See also ==
- Rivers of Queensland
- Rivers of New South Wales
