= Westmar, Queensland =

Westmar
- Suburb
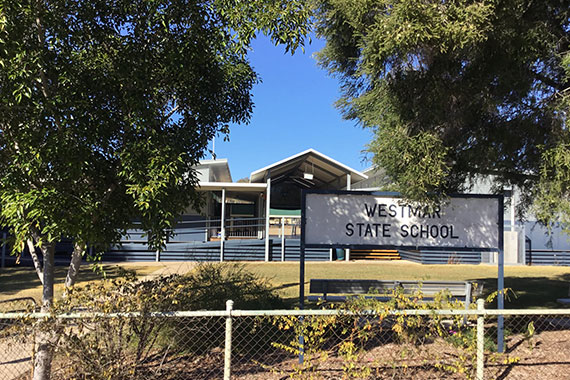
- Westmar State School, 2024

- Interactive map of Westmar
- Coordinates: 27.8825°S 149.7572°E
- Country: Australia
- State: Queensland
- LGA: Western Downs Region
- Location: 109 km (68 mi) NW of Goondiwindi; 118 km (73 mi) E of St George; 185 km (115 mi) Sw of Dalby; 248 km (154 mi) WSW of Toowoomba; 379 km (235 mi) W of Brisbane

Government
  - State electorate: Warrego
  - Federal division: Maranoa

Area
  - Total: 504.7 km^{2} (194.9 sq mi)

Population
  - Total: 59 (2021 census)
  - Density: 0.1169/km^{2} (0.3028/sq mi)
- Time zone: UTC+10:00 (AEST)
- Postcode: 4422
Suburbs around Westmar
Inglestone	Inglestone	Southwood
Flinton	Westmar	Southwood
Flinton	Tarawera	Lundavra

Westmar is a rural locality in the Western Downs Region, Queensland, Australia. In the 2021 census, Westmar had a population of 59 people.

== Geography ==
The Moonie River flows from east to west through the northern part of the locality. The Moonie Highway passes from east to west through the southern part of the locality.

Apart from the Kinkora State Forest on the eastern boundary of the locality, the land is used for agriculture, predominantly on a freehold basis.

== History ==
Beardmore Provisional School opened on 29 August 1960 at Cooroorah. It was officially opened as Beardmore State School on 29 March 1963. It closed on 5 December 1997. It was on Old Moonie Road (corner of Bendee Road, 27.7655°S 149.8461°E).

Westmar State School opened on 7 March 1962. In 2009, a war memorial was unveiled at the school commemorating those who had died in military conflicts.

== Demographics ==
In the 2016 census, Westmar had a population of 64 people.

In the 2021 census, Westmar had a population of 59 people.

== Economy ==
There are a number of homesteads in the locality, including:

- Bendee (27.8873°S 149.8397°E)
- Bendee West (27.9132°S 149.7440°E)
- Kinkora (27.8353°S 149.6835°E)
- Leumeah (27.9609°S 149.7708°E)
- Tremere (27.9009°S 149.7925°E)
- Woodlands (27.9659°S 149.6556°E)

== Education ==
Westmar State School is a government primary (Prep-6) school for boys and girls at 18425 Moonie Highway (27.9197°S 149.7195°E). In 2015, it had an enrolment of 22 students organised into 2 classes with 3 teachers (2 full-time equivalent). In 2018, the school had an enrolment of 41 students with 3 teachers and 5 non-teaching staff (3 full-time equivalent). In 2023, the school had an enrolment of 17 students.

There are no secondary schools in or near Westmar. Distance education and boarding schools are the options.
