= Glenmorgan, Queensland =

Glenmorgan
- Town
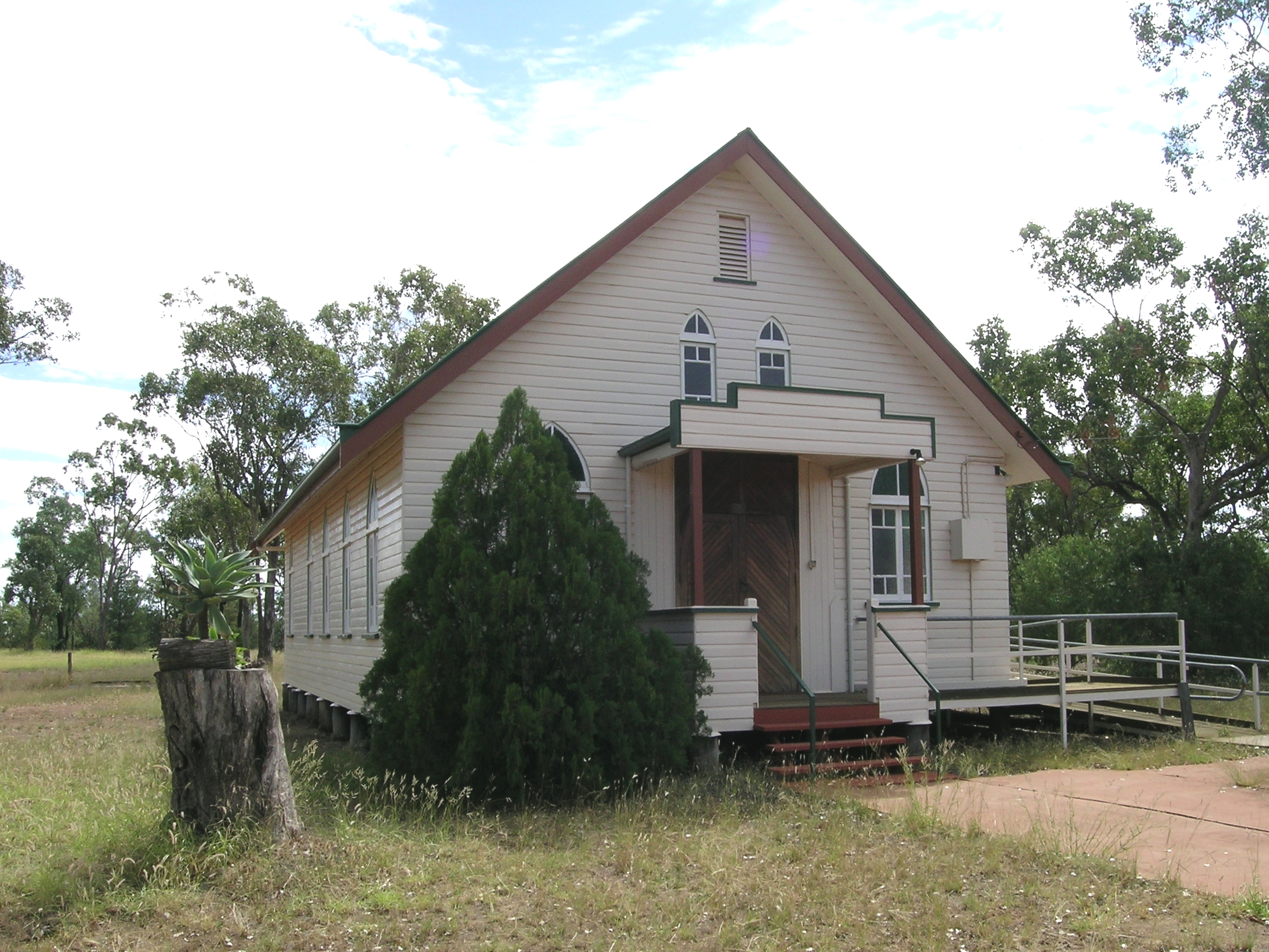
- Glenmorgan Community Church

- Interactive map of Glenmorgan
- Coordinates: 27.2488°S 149.6772°E
- Country: Australia
- State: Queensland
- LGAs: Western Downs Region; Maranoa Region
- Location: 65.1 km (40.5 mi) E of Surat; 83.5 km (51.9 mi) W of Tara; 145 km (90 mi) SE of Roma; 174 km (108 mi) W of Dalby; 385 km (239 mi) W of Brisbane

Government
  - State electorate: Warrego
  - Federal division: Maranoa

Area
  - Total: 1,376.5 km^{2} (531.5 sq mi)
- Elevation: 288 m (945 ft)

Population
  - Total: 121 (2021 census)
  - Density: 0.0879/km^{2} (0.2277/sq mi)
- Time zone: UTC+10:00 (AEST)
- Postcode: 4423
Localities around Glenmorgan
Warkon	Yulabilla	Yulabilla
Noorindoo	Glenmorgan	Meandarra
Parknook	Teelba	Coomrith

Glenmorgan is a rural town in the Western Downs Region and a locality split between the Western Downs Region and the Maranoa Region, Queensland, Australia. In the 2021 census, the locality of Glenmorgan had a population of 121 people.

== Geography ==
The town is located on Surat Developmental Road (known as Sybil Street within the town), 385 kilometres (239 mi) west of the state capital, Brisbane.

Erringibba National Park is a 877-hectare (2,170-acre) protected area in the east of the locality (27.2886°S 149.7053°E).

Apart from the national park, the predominant land use is grazing on native vegetation, along with some crop growing.

== History ==
The township derived its name from the Glenmorgan railway station used to honour Godfrey Morgan, a member of the Queensland Legislative Assembly (1909–1938), grazier, journalist, and Secretary for Railways 1929–32. The local street names, have been named after members of Godfrey Morgan's family. The area was formerly known as either Cobblegum Creek or Cobblegun Creek.

The Glenmorgan railway station on the Glenmorgan railway line opened on 12 December 1931.

Glenmorgan State School opened on 11 July 1933.

Glenmorgan Post Office opened on 1 November 1933 and closed by 1994.

On 15 October 1955 St Andrew's Presbyterian Church was opened and dedicated by Reverend Robert Bruce McIntyre, the Moderator of Presbytery of Toowoomba. It subsequently became Glenmorgan Community Church and is used for services of a number of denominations.

In 2008 the town won the Queensland Bush Spirit Award.

== Demographics ==
In the 2006 census, the locality of Glenmorgan and the surrounding area had a population of 86 people.

In the 2016 census, the locality of Glenmorgan had a population of 148 people.

In the 2021 census, the locality of Glenmorgan had a population of 121 people.

== Heritage listings ==
Local attractions include the heritage-listed Myall Park Botanic Garden which has one of Queensland's oldest collections of semi-arid plants and it was here that Grevillea 'Robyn Gordon' was originally propagated.

== Education ==
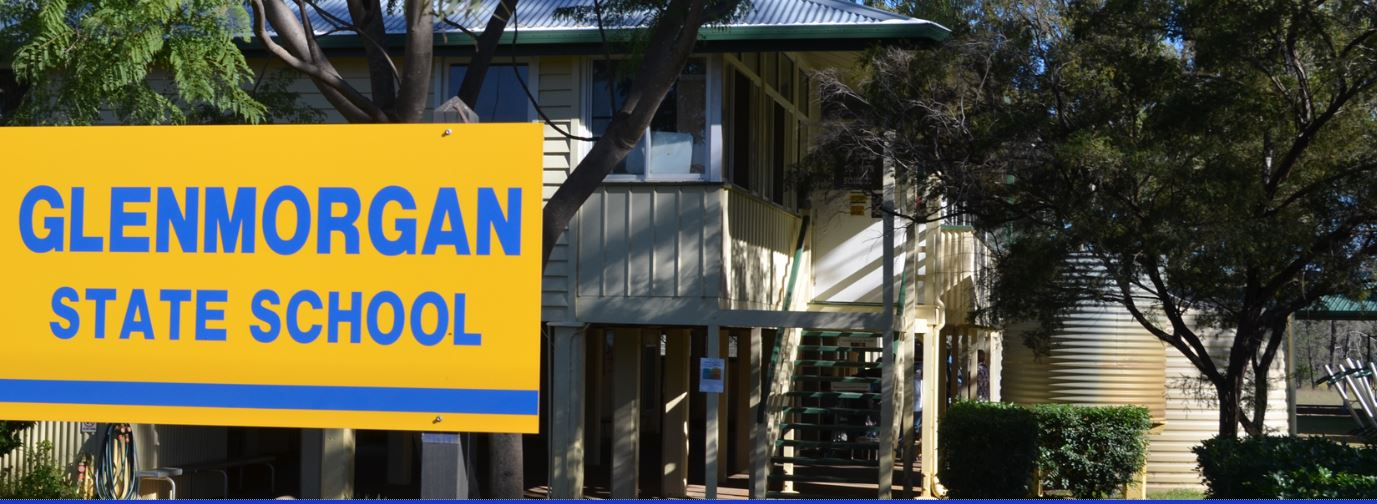
Glenmorgan State School, 2025

Glenmorgan State School is a government primary (Prep–6) school for boys and girls on the western side of Clive Street (27.2474°S 149.6755°E). In 2017, the school had an enrolment of 11 students with 2 teachers (1 full-time equivalent) and 5 non-teaching staff (2 full-time equivalent).

There are no secondary schools in Glenmorgan. The nearest government secondary schools are Surat State School (to Year 10 only) in Surat to the west and Tara Shire State College (to Year 12) in Tara to the east, but both are quite distant and distance education or boarding school are other options.

== Economy ==
There are a number of homesteads in the locality, including:

- Barellan Downs (27.1755°S 149.5040°E)
- Cooba (27.1674°S 149.4657°E)
- Currajong (27.3846°S 149.5636°E)
- Earlwood (27.2529°S 149.4381°E)
- Erambie (27.2400°S 149.5418°E)
- Murilla (27.0647°S 149.5545°E)
- Overstone (27.1353°S 149.4465°E)
- Pialaway (27.0374°S 149.4639°E)

== Facilities ==
Glenmorgan Post Office is at 16 Clive Street (27.2479°S 149.6759°E).

Glenmorgan Outpatients Clinic is a health centre in Godfrey Street (27.2475°S 149.6774°E).

There is a store in the town.

== Amenities ==
The Glenmorgan branch of the Queensland Country Women's Association operates rest rooms in the town.

Glenmorgan Community Church is on the north-western corner of Clive Street and Sybil Street (27.2480°S 149.6750°E). It contains a stained glass window as a memorial to Mabel Killen, the founding President of the Glenmorgan Presbyterian Women's Guild. The Meandarra/Glenmorgan Luthern congregation holds their services in the church.

Glenmorgan Returned Soldiers Memorial Hall is at 18 Godfrey Street (27.2485°S 149.6769°E). The Glenmorgan War Memorial is located in the grounds.

== Events ==
Glenmorgan holds an annual rodeo, fun and sports day.

== Attractions ==
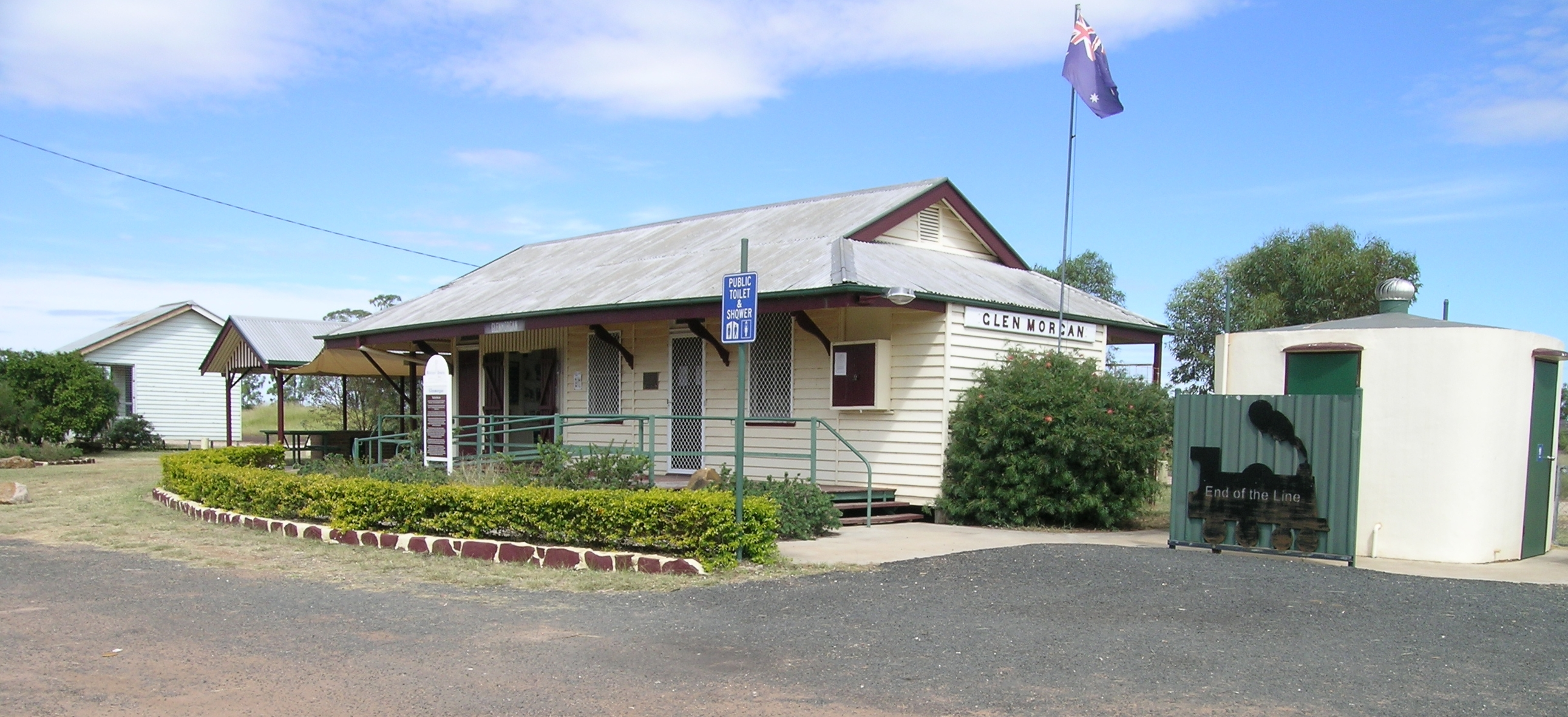
The End of The Line museum in the former Glenmorgan railway station, 2010

Monty's Garage and Vintage Car Museum is a 1940s style garage in Sybil Street (27.2495°S 149.6779°E). It has a large collection of restored vintage cars and trucks.

The "End of The Line" Museum is housed in the former Glenmorgan railway station in Sybil Street (27.2494°S 149.6769°E). It has a collection of railway memorabilia. There is a memorial to Colin and Joyce McKillop, who were original and life members of the Glenmorgan Restoration Committee which established the museum. Free camping is available behind the museum.

The Glenmorgan Showground in Methuen Street (27.2485°S 149.6809°E) hosts campdrafts and other sporting events.
