= TAFE Open Learning =

TAFE Open Learning (TOL) is a single point of contact for customers seeking distance education. TAFE Open Learning operates within Queensland.

TAFE Open Learning provides both Vocational Education Training (VET) and short courses for TAFE Queensland.

Courses provided by TAFE Open Learning are delivered through print based correspondence, online learning environments or blended learning methods.

== History ==
The Open Learning Institute of TAFE merged with Brisbane North Institute of TAFE in 2006. This merger was the result of a major overhaul of Queensland TAFE operations as detailed in the Queensland Skills Plan. This merger prompted the establishment of TAFE Open Learning as a new business unit. TAFE Open Learning now contributes increasing awareness for consumers seeking flexible off campus learning.

== Courses ==
Courses provided by TAFE Open Learning include:

- business and finance
- community and human services
- construction and engineering
- education and training
- government/Public sector
- information technology
- justice administration
- literacy, English language and tertiary preparation for adults
- science, animal science and environment
- travel and tourism
- short courses

== See also ==
- TAFE Queensland
- Learning Network Queensland
- UniLearn
- Barrier Reef Institute of TAFE
- Brisbane North Institute of TAFE
- SkillsTech Australia
- Southern Queensland Institute of TAFE
