= Blackswamp, Queensland =

Blackswamp
- Suburb
- Interactive map of Blackswamp
- Coordinates: 26.5766°S 150.5266°E
- Country: Australia
- State: Queensland
- LGA: Western Downs Region
- Location: 27.5 km (17.1 mi) NNW of Chinchilla; 107 km (66 mi) NW of Dalby; 199 km (124 mi) E of Roma; 318 km (198 mi) NW of Brisbane

Government
  - State electorate: Callide
  - Federal division: Maranoa

Area
  - Total: 179.0 km^{2} (69.1 sq mi)

Population
  - Total: 54 (2021 census)
  - Density: 0.3017/km^{2} (0.781/sq mi)
- Time zone: UTC+10:00 (AEST)
- Postcode: 4413
Suburbs around Blackswamp
Barakula	Barakula	Barakula
Hookswood	Blackswamp	Burncluith
Cameby	Baking Board	Red Hill

Blackswamp is a rural locality in the Western Downs Region, Queensland, Australia. In the 2021 census, Blackswamp had a population of 54 people.

== Geography ==
The land use is predominantly grazing on native vegetation with small areas of crop growing.

== History ==
Blackswamp Provisional School opened circa 1912 and closed circa 1914. It was located on the northern corner of the junction of Blackswamp Road and Burns Road (26.5642°S 150.4966°E).

== Demographics ==
In the 2016 census, Blackswamp had a population of 57 people.

In the 2021 census, Blackswamp had a population of 54 people.

== Education ==
There are no schools in Blackswamp. The nearest government primary school and government secondary school are Chinchilla State School and Chinchilla State High School, both in Chinchilla to the south.
