= Rywung, Queensland =

Rywung
- Suburb
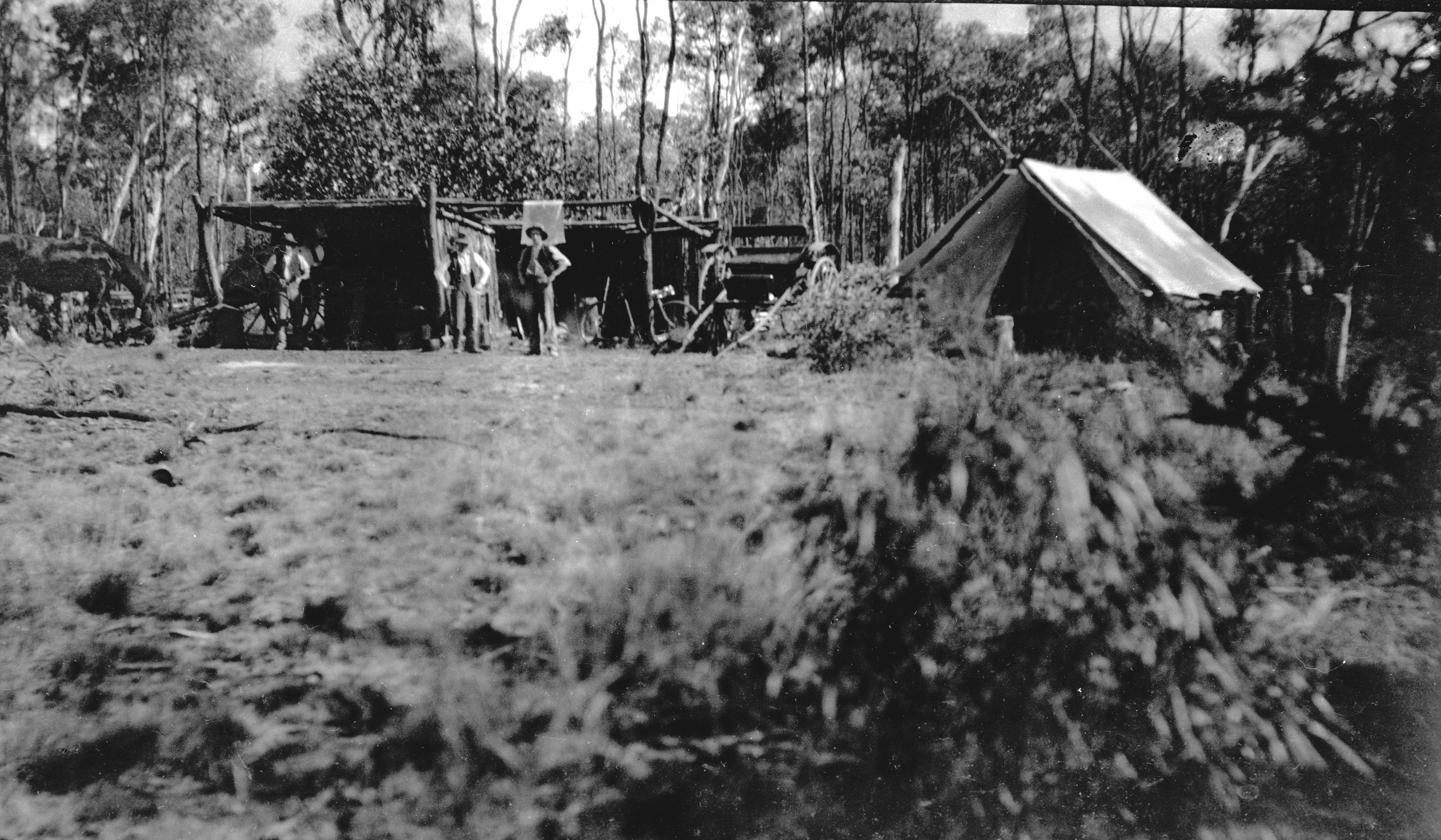
- First hut and tent pitched on the Harling property at Rywung, circa 1909

- Interactive map of Rywung
- Coordinates: 26.7180°S 150.4830°E
- Country: Australia
- State: Queensland
- LGA: Western Downs Region
- Location: 18.8 km (11.7 mi) WNW of Chinchilla; 33.1 km (20.6 mi) E of Miles; 98.7 km (61.3 mi) NW of Dalby; 182 km (113 mi) NW of Toowoomba; 309 km (192 mi) NW of Brisbane

Government
  - State electorate: Callide
  - Federal division: Maranoa

Area
  - Total: 34.6 km^{2} (13.4 sq mi)

Population
  - Total: 18 (2021 census)
  - Density: 0.520/km^{2} (1.35/sq mi)
- Time zone: UTC+10:00 (AEST)
- Postcode: 4413
Suburbs around Rywung
Goombi	Cameby	Cameby
Goombi	Rywung	Baking Board
Goombi	Greenswamp	Greenswamp

Rywung is a rural locality in the Western Downs Region, Queensland, Australia. Rywung's postcode is 4413. In the 2021 census, Rywung had a population of 18 people.

== Geography ==
The Warrego Highway and Western railway line are the northern boundary of the locality, entering the locality from the north-east (Cameby / Baking Board) and exiting to the north-west (Cameby / Goombi). The Rywung railway station serves the locality (26.6850°S 150.47189°E).

The land use is grazing on native vegetation.

== History ==
Unity Provisional School opened on 16 November 1922 and closed in 1931. It was on the south-western corner of Lees Road and B Kerrs Road on the present-day boundary between Goombi and Rywung (26.7256°S 150.4556°E).

Rywung Provisional School opened 1 November 1944. In June 1948, it became Rywung State School. It closed in 1968. It was located on C Kerrs Road near the Warrego Highway north of the Rywung railway station (26.6840°S 150.4727°E). Being north of the Warrego Highway means the school's location is now within the neighbouring locality of Cameby.

In 2009, there was a proposal to develop a coal mine in Rywung, but the project did not eventuate.

== Demographics ==
In the 2016 census, Rywung had a population of 27 people.

In the 2021 census, Rywung had a population of 18 people.

== Education ==
There are no schools in Rywung. The nearest government primary and secondary schools are Chinchilla State School and Chinchilla State High School, both in Chinchilla to the east. There are also non-government schools in Chinchilla.
