= Columboola =

Town and locality in Queensland, Australia

- Town
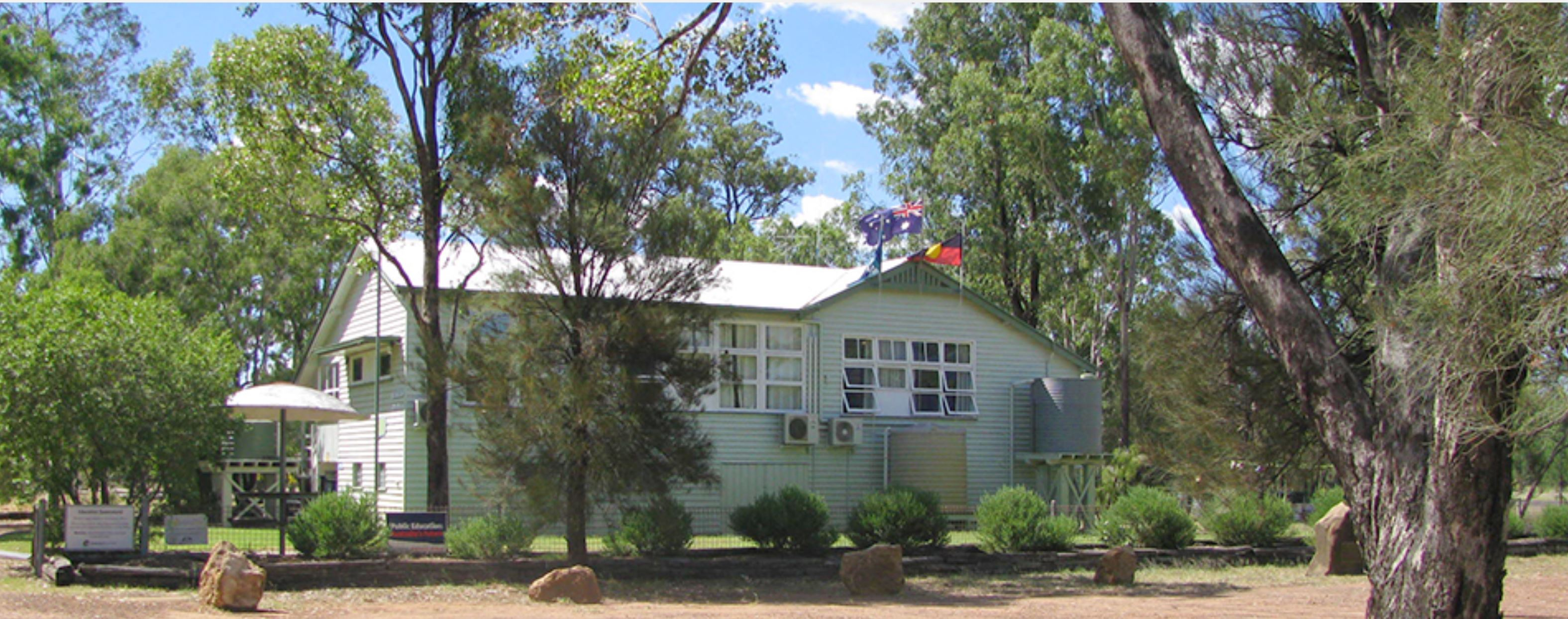
- Columboola Environmental Education Centre on the site of the former Columboola State School

- Interactive map of Columboola
- Coordinates: 26.6734°S 150.3374°E
- Country: Australia
- State: Queensland
- LGA: Western Downs Region
- Location: 15.3 km (9.5 mi) E of Miles; 31.5 km (19.6 mi) WNW of Chinchilla; 111 km (69 mi) NW of Dalby; 194 km (121 mi) NW of Toowoomba; 322 km (200 mi) NW of Brisbane

Government
  - State electorate: Callide
  - Federal division: Maranoa

Area
  - Total: 250.6 km^{2} (96.8 sq mi)

Population
  - Total: 68 (2021 census)
  - Density: 0.2713/km^{2} (0.703/sq mi)
- Time zone: UTC+10:00 (AEST)
- Postcode: 4415
Localities around Columboola
Hookswood	Hookswood	Cameby
Miles	Columboola	Goombi
Nangram	Greenswamp	Goombi

Columboola is a rural town and locality in the Western Downs Region, Queensland, Australia. In the 2021 census, the locality of Columboola had a population of 68 people.

== Geography ==
The town of Columboola is slightly north-east of the centre of the locality.

The Warrego Highway enters the locality from the east (Goombi), passes through the town, and exits the locality to the west (Miles).

The Western railway line runs immediately parallel to the highway, also passing through the town which was served by the now-abandoned Columboola railway station (26.6732°S 150.3398°E). Just west of the town, the railway has a balloon loop with the Cameby Downs railway station (26.6534°S 150.3356°E) serving the Camby Downs coal mine.

Dogwood is a neighbourhood in the south-west of the locality (26.7333°S 150.2833°E). It takes its name from Dogwood Creek, named by naturalist and explorer Ludwig Leichhardt on 23 October 1844, because of the profusion of dogwood shrubs (Jacksonia sp.) in the area.

== History ==
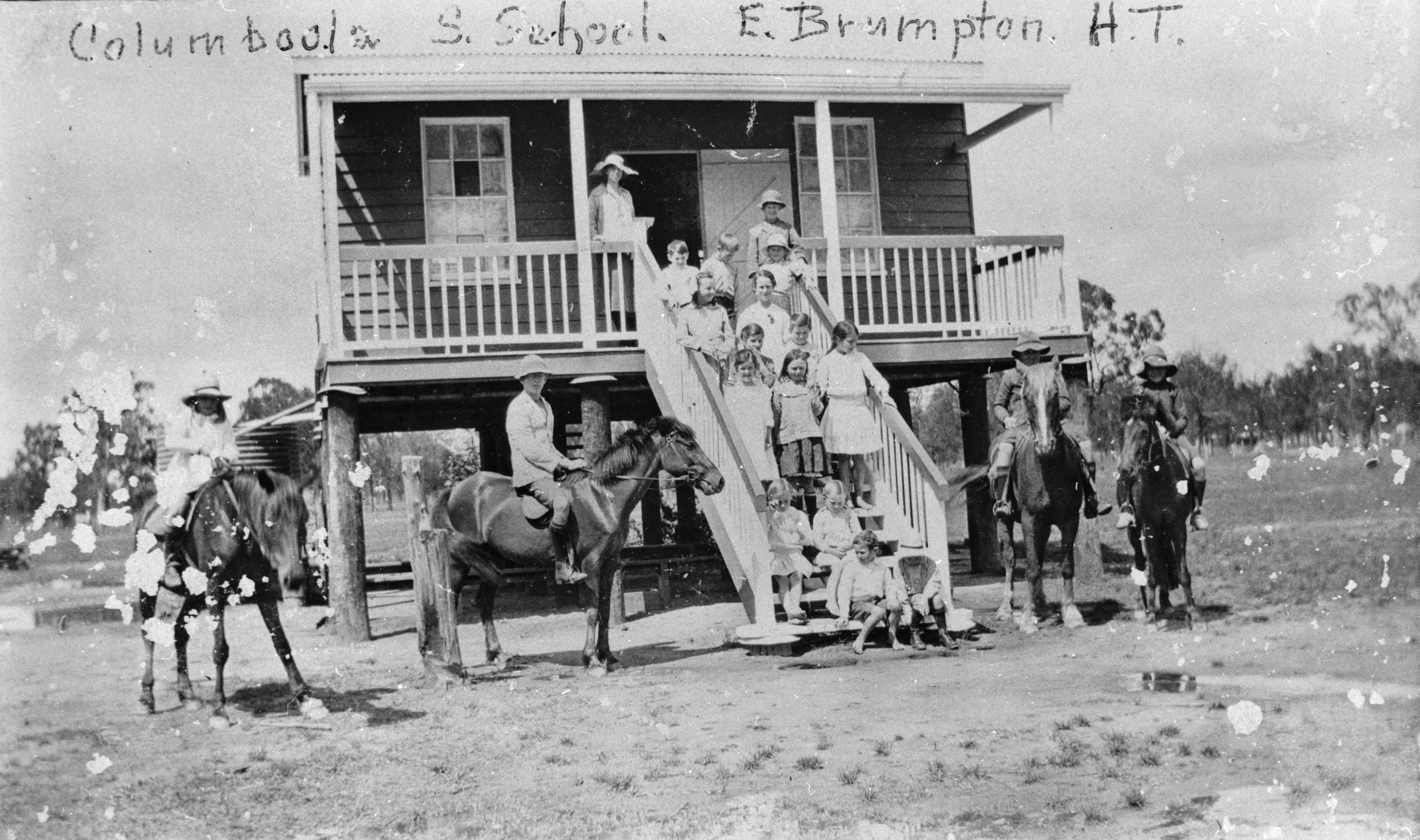
Columboola State School, circa 1919

The town takes its name from Columboola Creek, an Aboriginal word, meaning plenty of white cockatoos.

Columboola Provisional School opened on 20 July 1896 with 20 students. On 1 January 1909, it became Columboola State School. From 1942 through World War II, the school was closed so it could be used in connection with the ammunition storage facility on Cameby Downs. The school building was relocated to Miles State School. On 23 October 1954, Columboola State School reopened with a new building. It closed permanently on 28 April 1978. The school was at 25 Boort Koi Road (26.6712°S 150.3406°E). Since 1991, the school site has been used by the Columboola Environmental Education Centre.

Dogwood Provisional School opened in January 1925. In 1928, the Queensland Government decided that a better building was needed and relocated the Condamine Road State School building (that school having been closed for some years) to Dogwood where it opened as the Dogwood State School on 1 July 1929. It closed in March 1940. It was located immediately south of Columboola Creek and west of Freemans Road (approx 26.73665°S 150.30460°E).

In the early 1920s, the area had an active Scottish association, the Columboola and District Caledonian Society, which held their first highland gathering on New Year's Day 1923. They even had sufficient people to form a pipe band.

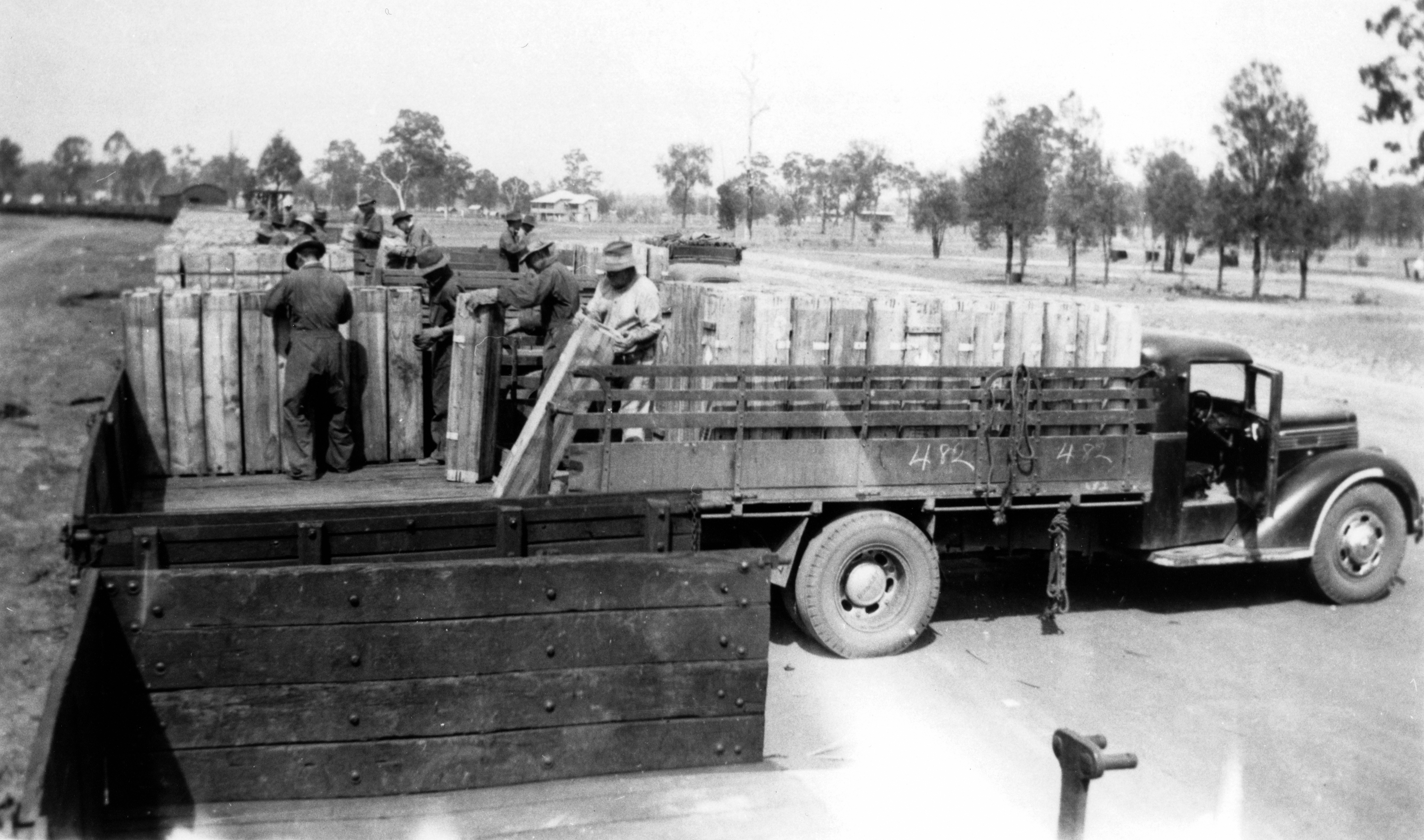
Loading bombs onto the back of a truck at Columboola Ammunition Depot, circa 1943

During World War II in 1942, an ammunition storage facility was built at Columboola adjacent to the railway line with a camp for 50 men. The site was used from 1942 to 1945 by the US military forces for the storage of large ammunition with the first ammunition arriving on 5 October 1942. Initially, the facility was for conventional munitions, but in June 1943, the facility was converted to store chemical munitions including mustard gas in artillery shells and aerial bombs. After the war, local residents occasionally found munitions at the site which were removed or destroyed by the Australian Army. When a mining company surveyed the site in 2009 with a view to establishing a coal mine, they identified a number of burial pits on the site. With the assistance of US military experts, the contents of the pits were determined to be 144 mustard gas munitions, the largest find of abandoned chemical munitions in Australian history. Under the Chemical Weapons Convention to which Australia is a signatory, the government had to report the find and the Australian Safeguards and Nonproliferation Office had to cooperate with the international Organisation for the Prohibition of Chemical Weapons to plan and implement the safe destruction/disposal of these munitions. A transportable munition destruction facility was brought to the site from the USA. Between April and May 2011, each munition was detonated in a controlled explosion inside a chamber in the computer-controlled facility, destroying both the munition and its chemical content. The project cost $34 million. In 2012, a memorial plaque was placed to commemorate the international collaboration involved in the destruction of the chemical weapons.

== Demographics ==
In the 2016 census, the locality of Columboola had a population of 72 people.

In the 2021 census, the locality of Columboola had a population of 68 people.

== Education ==
There are no schools in Columboola. The nearest government primary schools are Miles State School in Miles, 15.3 kilometres (9.5 mi) to the west and Chinchilla State School in Chinchilla, 31.5 kilometres (19.6 mi) to the east. The nearest government secondary schools are Miles State High School in Miles and Chinchilla State High School in Chinchilla.

Columboola Environmental Education Centre is at 25 Boort-Koi Road (26.6714°S 150.3402°E) on the former site of Columboola State School.

== Attractions ==
There is a memorial plaque at the environment education centre to commemorate the international collaboration in the safe destruction of the chemical weapons (26.67161°S 150.34050°E).
