= Goombi =

- Suburb
- Interactive map of Goombi
- Coordinates: 26.7169°S 150.4094°E
- Country: Australia
- State: Queensland
- LGA: Western Downs Region
- Location: 23 km (14 mi) E of Miles; 105 km (65 mi) NW of Dalby; 312 km (194 mi) WNW of Brisbane

Government
  - State electorate: Callide
  - Federal division: Maranoa

Area
  - Total: 110.9 km^{2} (42.8 sq mi)

Population
  - Total: 56 (2021 census)
  - Density: 0.505/km^{2} (1.308/sq mi)
- Time zone: UTC+10:00 (AEST)
- Postcode: 4413
Suburbs around Goombi
Columboola	Cameby	Cameby
Columboola	Goombi	Rywung
Columboola	Greenswamp	Greenswamp

Goombi is a rural locality in the Western Downs Region, Queensland, Australia. Goombi is one end of the Queensland rabbit-proof fence. In the 2021 census, Goombi had a population of 56 people.

Goombi's postcode is 4413.

== Geography ==
Goombi is a sparsely populated rural area, fully developed as farm land.

The Warrego Highway passes east to west through the northern part of the locality. The Western railway line runs parallel and immediately south of the highway, with Goombi railway station serving the locality (26.6768°S 150.4096°E).

== History ==
Goombi State School opened on 16 November 1915. It closed in 1964. It was on the southern side of the Warrego Highway opposite the Goombi railway station (26.67754°S 150.40896°E).

Unity Provisional School opened on 16 November 1922 and closed in 1931. It was on the south-western corner of Lees Road and B Kerrs Road on the present-day boundary between Goombi and Rywung (26.7256°S 150.4556°E).

== Demographics ==
In the 2016 census, Goombi had a population of 34 people.

In the 2021 census, Goombi had a population of 56 people.

== Education ==
There are no schools in Goombi. The nearest government primary schools are Chinchilla State School in Chinchilla to the east and Miles State School in Miles to the west. The nearest government secondary schools are Chinchilla State High School in Chinchilla and Miles State High School in Miles.
