= Nangram, Queensland =

Nangram
- Suburb
- Interactive map of Nangram
- Coordinates: 26.8366°S 150.3152°E
- Country: Australia
- State: Queensland
- LGA: Western Downs Region
- Location: 41.3 km (25.7 mi) SW of Chinchilla; 53.1 km (33.0 mi) SE of Miles; 107 km (66 mi) NW of Dalby; 190 km (120 mi) NW of Toowoomba; 381 km (237 mi) WNW of Brisbane

Government
  - State electorates: Callide; Warrego
  - Federal division: Maranoa

Area
  - Total: 101.9 km^{2} (39.3 sq mi)

Population
  - Total: 0 (2021 census)
  - Density: 0.000/km^{2} (0.000/sq mi)
- Time zone: UTC+10:00 (AEST)
- Postcode: 4416
Suburbs around Nangram
Miles	Columboola	Columboola
Condamine	Nangram	Greenswamp
Condamine	Wieambilla	Crossroads

Nangram is a rural locality in the Western Downs Region, Queensland, Australia. In the 2021 census, Nangram had "no people or a very low population".

== Geography ==
The Condamine River flows through the locality from east (Greenswamp/Crossroads) to west (Miles/Condamine).

The land use is a mixture of irrigated and dry crop farming in the north and west of the locality with grazing on native vegetation in the south and east of the locality.

== Demographics ==
In the 2016 census, Nangram had a population of 8 people.

In the 2021 census, Nangram had "no people or a very low population".

== Education ==
There are no schools in Nangram. The nearest government primary schools are Miles State School in neighbouring Miles to the north-west and Condamine State School in neighbouring Condamine to the south-west. The nearest government secondary schools are Miles State High School in Miles and Chinchilla State High School in Chinchilla to the north-east.
