= Cameby, Queensland =

Cameby
- Suburb
- Interactive map of Cameby
- Coordinates: 26.6347°S 150.4688°E
- Country: Australia
- State: Queensland
- LGA: Western Downs Region
- Location: 21.4 km (13.3 mi) WNW of Chinchilla; 32 km (20 mi) E of Miles; 102 km (63 mi) NW of Dalby; 201 km (125 mi) NW of Toowoomba; 301 km (187 mi) NW of Brisbane

Government
  - State electorate: Callide
  - Federal division: Maranoa

Area
  - Total: 137.2 km^{2} (53.0 sq mi)

Population
  - Total: 53 (2021 census)
  - Density: 0.386/km^{2} (1.001/sq mi)
- Time zone: UTC+10:00 (AEST)
- Postcode: 4413
Suburbs around Cameby
Hookswood	Blackswamp	Blackswamp
Columboola	Cameby	Blackswamp
Goombi	Rywung	Baking Board

Cameby is a rural locality in the Western Downs Region, Queensland, Australia. In the 2021 census, Cameby had a population of 53 people.

== Geography ==
The Warrego Highway and Western railway line are the southern boundary of the locality. The Rywung railway station serves the locality (26.6850°S 150.47189°E).

There is an identified thermal coal resource area known as Davies Road (26.602°S 150.419°E) with reserves estimated at 49.4 megatonnes (48,600,000 long tons; 54,500,000 short tons) within the locality.

The land use is predominantly grazing on native vegetation with some cropping.

== History ==
Cambey Provisional School opened in 1922 and closed circa 1935. It was at 613 Cameby Road (26.63184°S 150.48634°E).

Rywung State School opened on 1 November 1944 and closed on 31 December 1968. It was located on C Kerrs Road near the Warrego Highway north of the Rywung railway station (26.6840°S 150.4727°E). Being north of the Warrego Highway means the school's location is now within Cameby.

== Demographics ==
In the 2016 census, Cameby had a population of 56 people.

In the 2021 census, Cameby had a population of 53 people.

== Education ==
There are no schools in the locality. The nearest government primary schools are Chinchilla State School in Chinchilla to the south-east and Miles State School in Miles to the west. The nearest government primary schools are Chinchilla State High School in Chinchilla and Miles State High School in Miles.
