= Greenswamp, Queensland =

Greenswamp
- Suburb
- Interactive map of Greenswamp
- Coordinates: 26.8002°S 150.4641°E
- Country: Australia
- State: Queensland
- LGA: Western Downs Region
- Location: 19.9 km (12.4 mi) SWS of Chinchilla; 103 km (64 mi) NW of Dalby; 183 km (114 mi) NW of Toowoomba; 313 km (194 mi) WNW of Brisbane

Government
  - State electorate: Callide
  - Federal division: Maranoa

Area
  - Total: 162.3 km^{2} (62.7 sq mi)
- Elevation: 270–390 m (890–1,280 ft)

Population
  - Total: 77 (2021 census)
  - Density: 0.474/km^{2} (1.229/sq mi)
- Time zone: UTC+10:00 (AEST)
- Postcode: 4413
Suburbs around Greenswamp
Goombi	Rywung	Baking Board
Columboola	Greenswamp	Chinchilla
Nangram	Crossroads	Crossroads

Greenswamp is a rural locality in the Western Downs Region, Queensland, Australia. In the 2021 census, Greenswamp had a population of 77 people.

== Geography ==
The locality is bounded to the south-east by the Condamine River. The elevation ranges from 270 to 390 metres (890 to 1,280 ft) with lower land nearer the river and the higher land to the north.

The land use is a mixture of grazing on native vegetation on the hilly land and growing crops on the flatter lower land.

== History ==
Fairy Meadow Road State School opened on 5 November 1915. It closed in 1919. It was on the northern side of Greenswamp Road (approx 26.80917°S 150.41493°E).

Green Swamp State School opened circa 1936. It closed in 1950.

== Demographics ==
In the 2016 census, Greenswamp had a population of 40 people.

In the 2021 census, Greenswamp had a population of 77 people.

== Education ==
There are no schools in Greenswamp. The nearest primary and secondary schools are Chincilla State School and Chinchilla State High School in neighbouring Chinchilla to the east.
