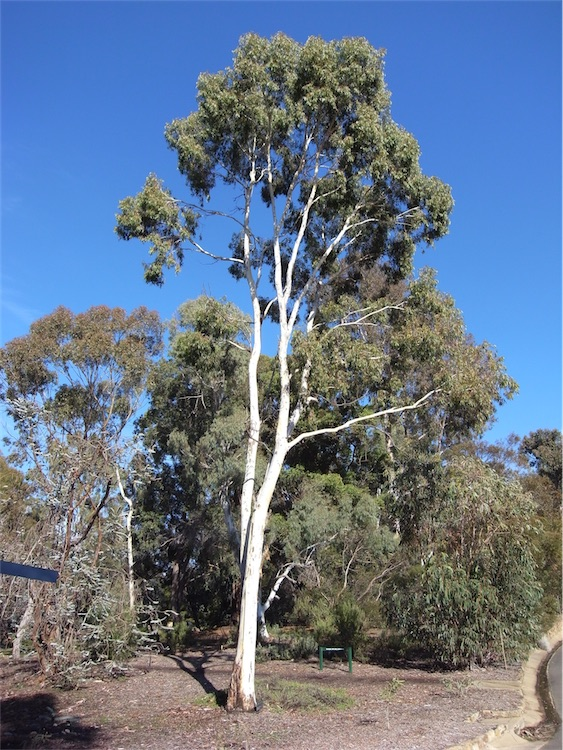
- In the Australian National Botanic Gardens

Conservation status
- Endangered (IUCN 3.1)

Scientific classification
- Kingdom: Plantae
- Clade: Tracheophytes
- Clade: Angiosperms
- Clade: Eudicots
- Clade: Rosids
- Order: Myrtales
- Family: Myrtaceae
- Genus: Eucalyptus
- Species: E. argophloia

Binomial name
- Eucalyptus argophloia Blakely

= Eucalyptus argophloia =

Queensland white gum

Species of eucalyptus

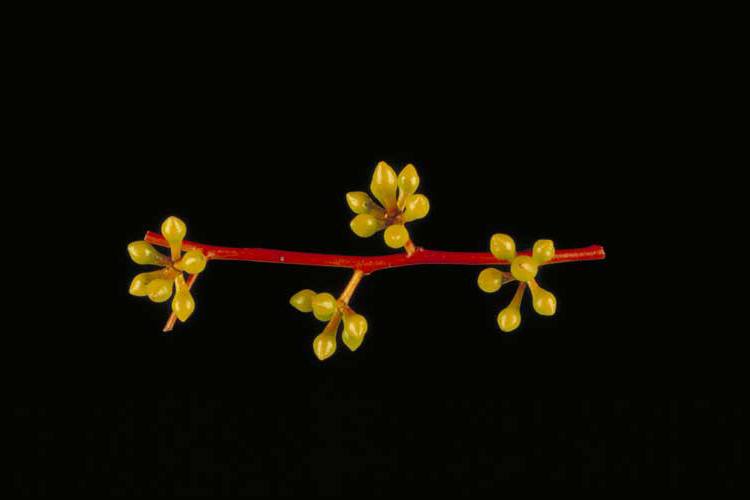
Flower buds

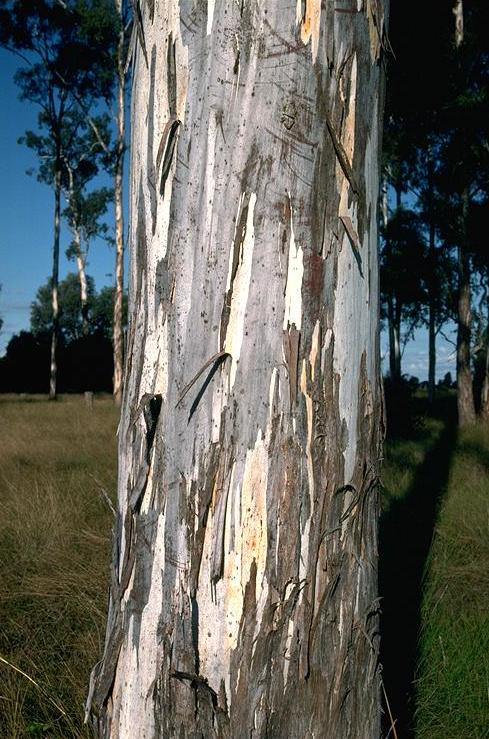
Bark on a tree near Burncluith

Eucalyptus argophloia, commonly known as Queensland western white gum, Queensland white gum, scrub gum, lapunyah, Burncluith gum or Chinchilla white gum is a tree that is endemic to a small area of Queensland. It has smooth white bark ageing to other colours, narrow lance-shaped adult leaves, more or less spherical flower buds in groups of seven, white flowers and small, hemispherical to cup-shaped fruit.

== Description ==
Eucalyptus argophloia is tree that typically grows to a height of 18 to 30 metres (59 to 98 ft) with bark that is white but dappled with grey and brown and shed in long ribbons. Leaves on young plants and on coppice regrowth are arranged in opposite pairs and linear to narrow lance-shaped, 45 to 90 millimetres (1.8 to 3.5 in) long and 1 to 14 millimetres (0.0 to 0.6 in) wide. Adult leaves are lance-shaped, 65 to 140 millimetres (2.6 to 5.5 in) long, 8 to 20 millimetres (0.3 to 0.8 in) wide on a petiole 5 to 15 millimetres (0.2 to 0.6 in) long. The leaves are the same glossy green on both sides. The flowers buds are arranged in groups of seven in leaf axils on a peduncle 5 to 10 millimetres (0.2 to 0.4 in) long, the individual buds on a pedicel 1 to 4 millimetres (0.04 to 0.16 in) long. Mature buds are oval to more or less spherical, 4 to 6 millimetres (0.16 to 0.24 in) long and 3 to 4 millimetres (0.12 to 0.16 in) wide with a rounded operculum. Flowering occurs in May and June and the flowers are white. The fruit is a woody, hemispherical to cup-shaped capsule, 3 to 5 millimetres (0.12 to 0.20 in) long and 5 to 7 millimetres (0.20 to 0.28 in) wide.

== Taxonomy and naming ==
Eucalyptus argophloia was first formally described in 1934 by William Blakely and the description was published in his book A key to the Eucalypts from a specimen collected near Burncluith north of Chinchilla. The specific epithet (argophloia) refers to the bark of this tree species.

== Distribution and habitat ==
Queensland white gum has a limited range and is known only from a small area north east of Chinchilla where it grows in brown to black clay or clay-loam soils. The number of populations and the total number of plants is unknown. It is often found in association with brigalow (Acacia harpophylla) or Eucalyptus microcarpa on flat terrain in areas that were once open forest.

== Conservation ==
This eucalypt is classified as "vulnerable" under the Australian Government Environment Protection and Biodiversity Conservation Act 1999 and under the Queensland Government Nature Conservation Act 1992. The main threat to the species is habitat destruction caused by land clearing and grazing.

== Uses ==
It produces deep red timber, which is strong hard and durable. It is one of the species selected for improvement under the New Zealand Dryland Forestry Initiative.

== See also ==
- List of Eucalyptus species
