= Chinchilla Digger Statue =

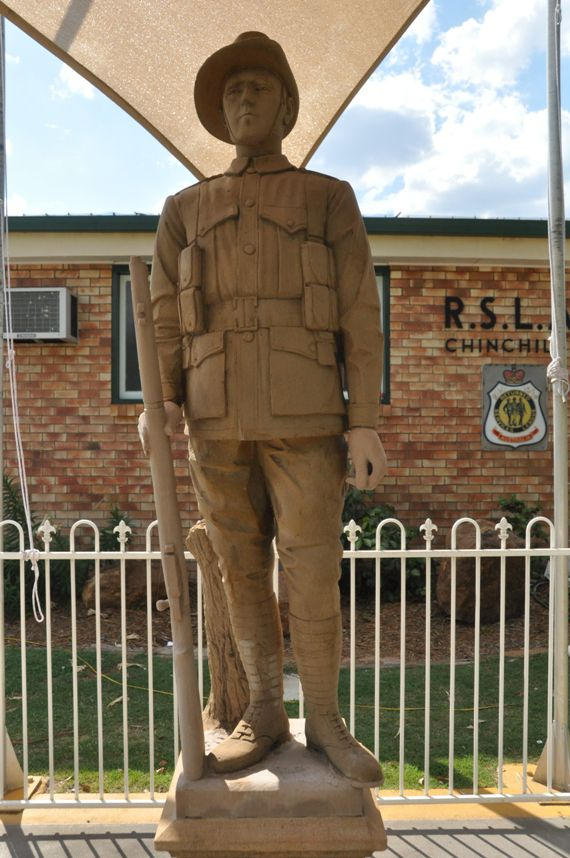
- Digger Statue, 2011

- Location within Queensland Location within Australia
- 26.7421°S 150.623°E
- Location: 57 Heeney Street, Chinchilla, Western Downs Region, Queensland, Australia

History
- Design period: 1914–1919 (World War I)
- Built: 1919

Site notes
- Architect: Andrew Lang Petrie

Queensland Heritage Register
- Official name: Soldier Statue, Chinchilla, Chinchilla WWI Memorial, Chinchilla 'Digger' Statue
- Type: state heritage (built)
- Designated: 1 August 1999
- Reference no.: 601269
- Significant period: 1919–1977, 1992–onwards
- Significant components: memorial – soldier statue, plaque
- Builders: A L Petrie & Son

The Digger Statue is a heritage-listed memorial at 57 Heeney Street, Chinchilla, Western Downs Region, Queensland, Australia. It was designed by Andrew Lang Petrie and built in 1919 by A L Petrie & Son. It is also known as the Chinchilla WWI Memorial and Chinchilla Soldier Statue. It was added to the Queensland Heritage Register on 1 August 1999.

== History ==
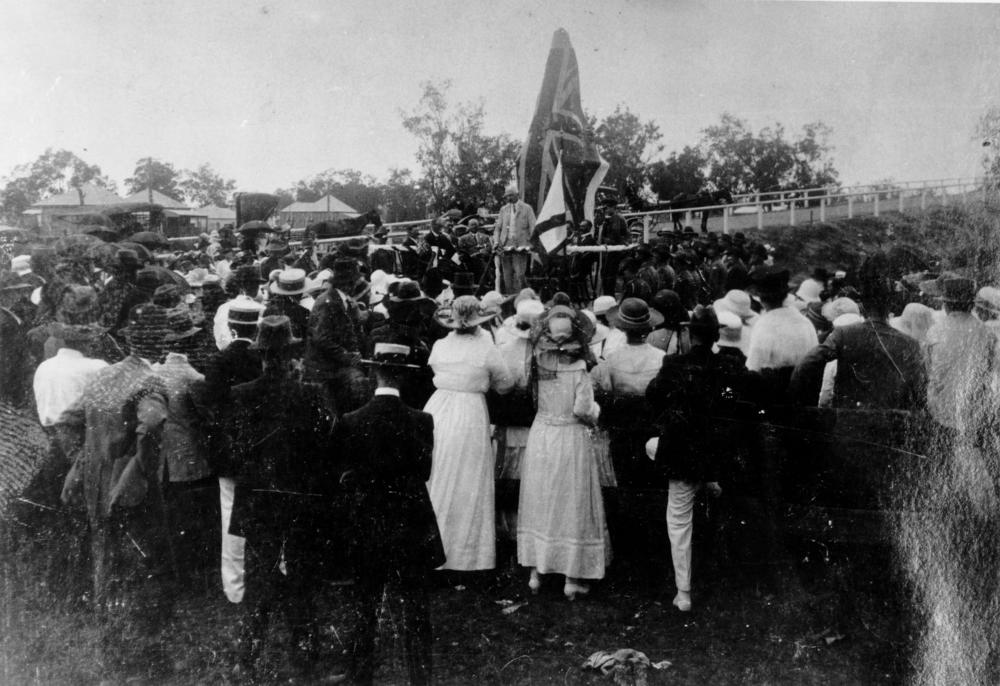
Unveiling of the war memorial by Governor Goold-Adams, 1919

The Chinchilla digger statue was erected as part of the Chinchilla War Memorial, unveiled on 30 January 1919 by the Governor of Queensland, Sir Hamilton John Goold-Adams, GCMG, CB. The memorial was designed and executed by the well-known monumental masonry firm of AL Petrie of Toowong, Brisbane. In 1977 the statue was removed from its original position and separated from its pedestal and base. Part of the pedestal was re-erected in Fuller Place in Heeney Street in 1979, surmounted by a spire; while the statue was kept in storage until re-erected in front of the Returned Services League of Australia (RSL) hall further south on Heeney Street in 1992.

The Chinchilla district, on the northern Darling Downs, had been opened to non-indigenous settlement following explorer Ludwig Leichhardt's journey through this area in late 1844. Pastoral runs (both sheep and cattle) were taken up in the second half of the 1840s, including Matthew Goggs' Chinchilla run (by 1848). At Charley's Creek, on the main dray route from Toowoomba to western Queensland, teamsters regularly camped, and by late 1876 a small township of three hotels, three stores and two butcher shops had been established there. With the Western Railway extension from Dalby to Dulacca constructed in the 1870s, the Chinchilla railway station opened at Charley's Creek in January 1878, and remained the railhead until August that year. The town of Chinchilla was surveyed around the railway station in late 1880/early 1881, and in the last two decades of the 19th century, developed as a railway locomotive depot (mid-way on the Toowoomba–Roma run), and as a service centre to surrounding pastoral properties. In the early years of the 20th century, the town's progress was retarded by the spread of prickly pear throughout the district. In 1917, 1920 and 1922 devastating fires which destroyed many of the commercial buildings in Chinchilla Street (one entire side was destroyed in 1922). Rapid eradication of the prickly pear following the introduction of cactoblastis larvae in the mid-1920s opened the area to closer settlement, and during the 1930s Chinchilla prospered as a district centre, despite worldwide economic depression.

As early as 1915, residents of Chinchilla formed a committee to raise funds for a memorial to the soldiers and a nurse from Chinchilla Shire serving or having given their lives in World War I (1914–18). At the time, war memorials were becoming a feature of the Australian landscape, recording the devastating impact of war on a young nation. By the war's end, some 60,000 Australians had lost their lives from a population of about 4 million, representing one in five of those who served. By 1925 most communities across the nation had a war memorial, a visible expression of grief that cut across class, ethnic and other divisions of Australian society. To those that erected them, war memorials were as sacred as grave sites, substitute graves for the Australians whose bodies lay in battlefield cemeteries in Europe and the Middle East.

For their war memorial, the Chinchilla residents chose a monument to be supplied by the leading monumental masonry firm of AL Petrie of Toowong, Brisbane. The firm was responsible for many of Queensland's war memorials, distributing them via the railways and a network of country agents. Petrie's offered a range of memorial types, but the most common being a digger (soldier) statue standing on a sandstone pedestal which bore a series of marble plates with leaded inscriptions and names; this in turn resting on a granite base. This common type was commissioned for Chinchilla. The cost of such a memorial averaged about £300.

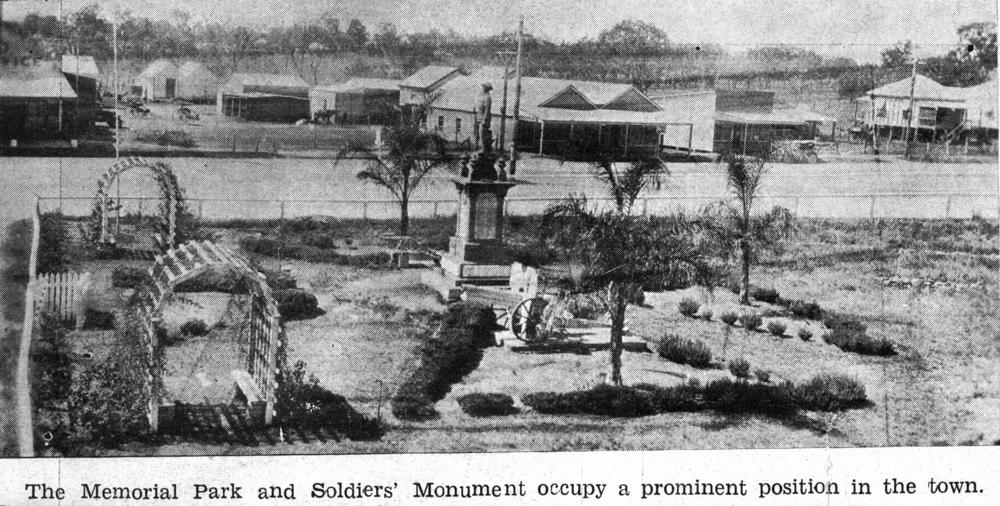
The digger statue in its original park location, 1935

Originally the Chinchilla War Memorial occupied a prominent position in the townscape, in a small memorial park in Chinchilla Street, near the footbridge over the railway line. In the early 1920s the Chinchilla branch of the Queensland Country Women's Association (established 1922), became involved in the landscaping of the park. A 1935 photograph shows a garden with four paths bordered by low bushes, leading to the war memorial, which provided the central focus to the park. Palm trees, trellises and a white picket fence and gate contributed to the park aesthetics. In 1952 nearly half of the memorial park was resumed for road purposes.

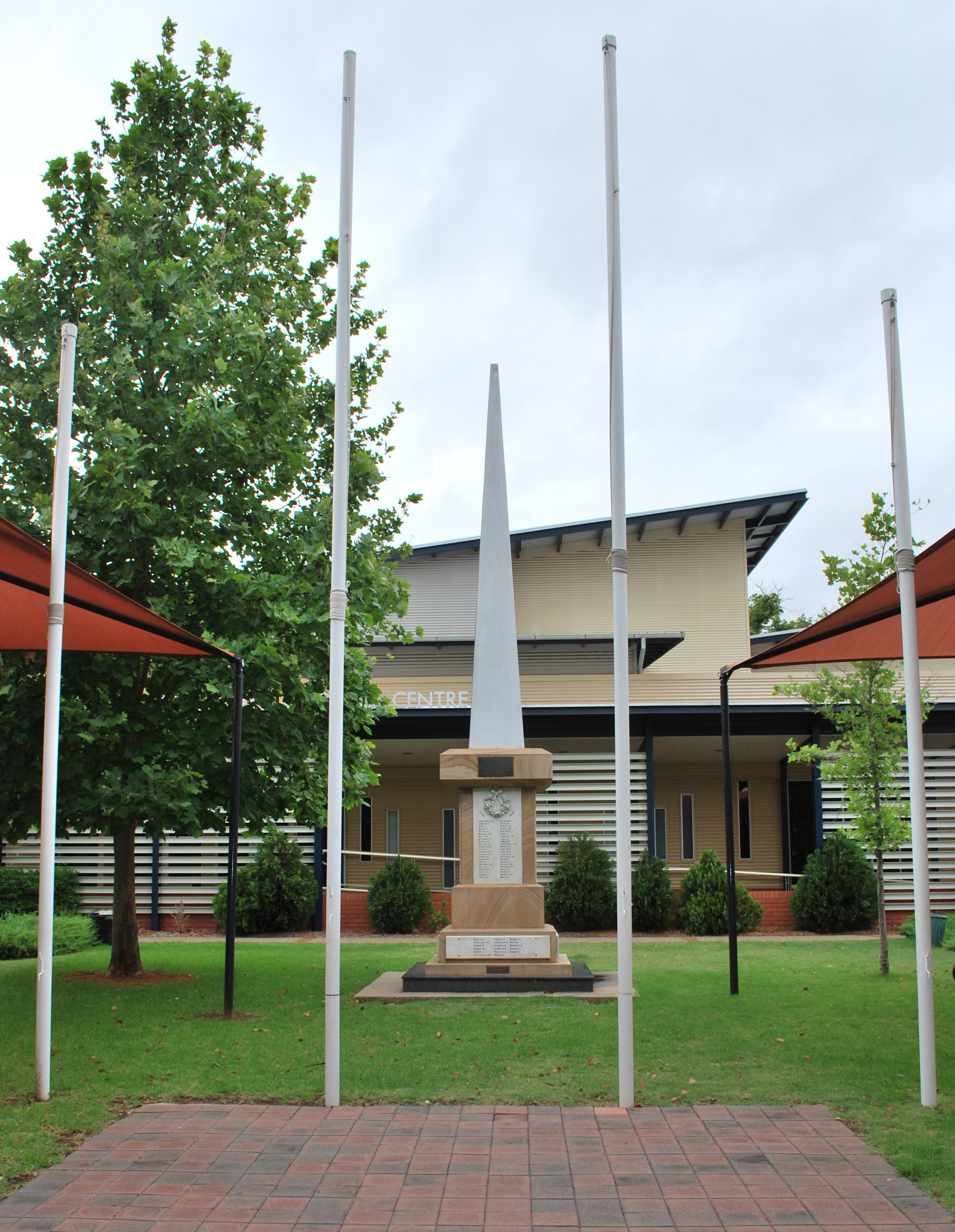
War memorial with aluminium spire, 2008

By the 1970s the town centre had shifted from Chinchilla Street to Heeney Street, south of the railway line; hence in 1977 the war memorial was also relocated. The pedestal, refurbished by the Toowoomba firm of Zeigler's and incorporating the original marble plates but not its four urns, was erected at Fuller Place in Heeney Street, in front of the Chinchilla Civic Centre where it was re-dedicated on 17 March 1979. The new structure was crowned by an aluminium obelisk while the soldier statue, which had been vandalised, was stored at the local museum. In 1992 the Women's Auxiliary of the Chinchilla Sub-Branch of the Returned Services League of Australia raised funds for the restoration of the statue and its relocation to the front grounds of the RSL Sub Branch Hall in Heeney Street, on the opposite side of the road and about a block south from Fuller Place and the official Chinchilla War Memorial.

The Chinchilla statue remains one of an important group of 55 surviving soldier statues, of the 61 erected throughout Queensland during or soon after World War I.

== Description ==
The Chinchilla soldier statue is located in the front grounds of the Chinchilla RSL Hall in Heeney Street, close to the building, and facing the street. It is a slightly smaller than life-sized (1.54-metre (5 ft 1 in)) sandstone statue of an Australian infantryman with slouch hat, standing at ease and resting the butt of his rifle on the ground, supported at the base by a tree stump (as were most soldier statues). The statue stands on a sandstone block, a remnant of the original pedestal, ornamented on the front face with crossed flags carved in relief. The flags, a British Union Jack and the Australian flag, symbolise the dual nature of Australian patriotism at the time and old photographs show that they were originally painted in red, white and blue. This block in turn rests on another, larger and more recent sandstone block, which has a brass plaque on the front face, with the inscription: "Renovated & Relocated by the RSL Women's Auxiliary 1992". The whole rests on a ground-level concrete foundation, and is surrounded by a modern metal fence (not considered of cultural heritage significance). A shade structure has been erected over it, which also is not of cultural heritage significance. Two metal flag poles are bolted to the outer rear corners of the concrete foundation. Unfortunately, the statue has been painted in semi-realistic colours, which was not the original intention, and the hands and rifle have been replaced following earlier vandalism.

The Chinchilla statue is typical of the soldier statues supplied by the firm of AL Petrie throughout Queensland, which depict ordinary Australian infantrymen standing either at ease or attention, or in mourning with arms reversed. The former, as chosen by Chinchilla, was generally used if the memorial bore the names of all who served from a community whereas a figure in mourning was preferred if the memorial bore only the names of the dead. The original pedestal, the "Coomera" type, was crowned by urns (a symbol of death) on all four corners and had corner pilasters with acanthus leaf capitals. It was similar to the pedestals supplied by Petrie's for the war memorials at Upper Coomera (the earliest, in 1918, Gold Coast City Council Local Heritage Register 0073), Cordalba, Moggill, Tingalpa, Kandanga, Gin Gin, Tewantin, Cooroy and Herberton.

== Heritage listing ==
The Chinchilla Digger Statue was listed on the Queensland Heritage Register on 1 August 1999 having satisfied the following criteria.

The place is important in demonstrating the evolution or pattern of Queensland's history.

The Chinchilla Digger Statue, erected in 1919 as part of the local community's memorial to World War I and funded by public subscription, no longer retains its physical association with the official memorial, however it still serves as a reminder of the contribution of the Chinchilla district to the war effort. It has acquired, in its relocation, a more recent association with the local branch of the Returned Services League of Australia.

The statue, now located just outside the local RSL Hall, surrounded by a metal fence, lacking its original pedestal and base - and consequently its associated inscriptions and name plates - and repaired and painted, has lost its landmark and documentary value, and also much of its aesthetic and symbolic value. However, it is one of an important group of soldier statues erected throughout Queensland during or soon after World War I, these being the state's most popular type of war monument.
