= Baking Board, Queensland =

Baking Board
- Suburb
- Interactive map of Baking Board
- Coordinates: 26.6983°S 150.5644°E
- Country: Australia
- State: Queensland
- LGA: Western Downs Region
- Location: 10.6 km (6.6 mi) NW of Chinchilla; 90.6 km (56.3 mi) NW of Dalby; 173 km (107 mi) NW of Toowoomba; 301 km (187 mi) NW of Brisbane

Government
  - State electorate: Callide
  - Federal division: Maranoa

Area
  - Total: 91.2 km^{2} (35.2 sq mi)

Population
  - Total: 114 (2021 census)
  - Density: 1.250/km^{2} (3.237/sq mi)
- Time zone: UTC+10:00 (AEST)
- Postcode: 4413
Suburbs around Baking Board
Cameby	Blackswamp	Red Hill
Rywung	Baking Board	Chinchilla
Greenswamp	Chinchilla	Chinchilla

Baking Board is a rural locality in the Western Downs Region, Queensland, Australia. In the 2021 census, Baking Board had a population of 114 people.

== Geography ==
Baking Board railway station is an abandoned railway station on the Western railway line (26.7075°S 150.5443°E).

== History ==
The locality's name comes from Bakingboard Creek, reportedly so named because a piece of bark was found there and used as a damper mixing board.

Baking Board State School opened on 15 May 1909. It closed for a short period in 1930 due to low student numbers. It closed permanently on 1 August 1961. It was located near the Warrego Highway (approx 26.7082°S 150.5440°E).

In 1914, a Methodist church was opened in Baking Board. By 1965, it had closed and been relocated to Wandoan.

== Demographics ==
In the 2016 census Baking Board had a population of 97 people.

In the 2021 census, Baking Board had a population of 114 people.

== Education ==
There are no schools in Baking Board. The nearest government primary school is Chinchilla State School in neighbouring Chinchilla to the south-east. The nearest government secondary school is Chinchilla State High School, also in Chinchilla.
