= Southern Queensland Institute of TAFE =

Southern Queensland Institute of TAFE (SQIT) is an Australian vocational college for teaching Tertiary and Further Education. The Institute provides training across a significant portion of Southern Queensland with campuses in Toowoomba, Roma, Warwick, Kingaroy, Dalby, Chinchilla, Charleville, Cherbourg and Stanthorpe.

The Cherbourg campus is known by the name 'Nurunderi' which means 'Taught by Great Spirit' and is notable for being the only TAFE campus in Queensland to be built on designated Aboriginal land.

SQIT offers more than 300 courses covering a number of different study areas, and course qualifications vary from Certificate I level, through to Advanced Diploma. The student demographic varies, and includes high school students, to school leavers, international students, through to those seeking a career change. SQIT also works closely with industry to provide tailored training, qualifications, and skillsets to employees.

SQIT students are able to choose from courses covering:

- Arts, entertainment and media
- Building and construction
- Commerce and IT
- Engineering and automotive
- General education and training
- Hairdressing, beauty and massage
- Health and community services
- Horticulture and primary industries
- Hospitality, tourism and events, and
- Mining, resources and infrastructure.

SQIT courses can be taught on-campus or externally and if eligible, students can use Recognition of Prior Learning to gain qualifications. SQIT students can also gain credit towards university degrees, and some SQIT courses offer pathways to university.

Awards:

- 2012 State Finalist – 'Large Training Provider of the Year' – Queensland Training Awards
- 2012 Darling Downs South West Regional Winner – Hauenschild Apprentice of the Year – Queensland Training Awards
- 2012 Darling Downs South West Regional Winner – Bob Marshman Trainee of the Year – Queensland Training Awards
- 2012 Darling Downs South West Regional Winner – Aboriginal and Torres Strait Island Student of the Year – Queensland Training Awards
- 2012 Staff Excellence Award from the Department of Education, Training and Employment
- 2011 MINTRAC - National Meat Industry Training Initiative Award - Kangaroo Harvester Refresher Training program
- 2011 Health and Community Services Workforce Innovation Awards - Excellence in Cultural Inclusiveness in the Workforce SQIT's Indigenous Primary Health Care team
- 2011 Health and Community Services Workforce Innovation Awards - Excellence in Recruitment Aged Care Skills Formation Strategy Toowoomba
