= Indoor netball =

Sport

- Highest governing body: World Indoor Netball Association
- Nicknames: Indoor (cf "outdoor" netball)
- Clubs: Worldwide

Characteristics
- Contact: Non-contact
- Team members: Six or seven players per team on court
- Mixed-sex: Mixed, ladies or mens
- Type: Indoor ball sport
- Equipment: Netball

Indoor netball

Indoor netball is a variation of netball, played exclusively indoors, in which the playing court is surrounded on each side and overhead by a net. The net prevents the ball from leaving the court, reducing the number of playing stoppages. This gives indoor netball a faster pace than netball.

There are two main types of indoor netball, "6-a-side" and "7-a-side". Indoor netball has a larger focus towards mixed-gender matches than netball does, although ladies' games, and to a smaller extent men's games, are ever-present. While the sport does not have as large a following as netball does, its popularity is growing in countries such as England, South Africa, Australia and New Zealand. The sport is administered at an international level by the World Indoor Netball Association (WINA)

== Overview ==
The rules of indoor netball are similar to that of netball, with two teams aiming to score as many goals as possible. An indoor netball game usually consists of four-quarters of 10 minutes. There are two umpires one for each half of the court. The winning team is the one with the most points at the end of the match. In case of a tie in elimination games, two straight 5-minute overtimes are played; if still tied, whoever is up two points will win.

=== 6-a-side ===
In this version the court is divided into halves rather than thirds, and there are six players per team rather than seven. The team is made up of two Centres/Link players, two Attack players, and two Defence players. The two Attack players are located in one half and the two Defence in the opposite half to their Attacking side. Both the Attackers and Defenders are allowed anywhere in their half of the court which includes the shooting circles. The Centre/Link players are allowed to be anywhere on the court except for the shooting circles at either end. Scoring is also different, with some resemblance to Fast5 netball: Attackers can shoot from inside the circle, with a successful shot worth 1 point. Attackers or Centre/Link players can also shoot from circle edge or further back-outside of the circle. A successful shot from this distance or further scores 2 points (much like 3-pointers in basketball). Fundamentally, this changes the game play from normal 7-a-side netball significantly, with the Attack players working to set up the Centre/Link players for the 2-point shot.

Once a goal is scored, a Defence player from the opposition team takes a throw-off from the top of their circle. This makes the game even faster as the ball doesn't have to be sent back to the centre third for a centre pass like 7-a-side.

=== 7-a-side ===
This version is a lot like original netball, with the court in divided into thirds and with seven players similarly positioned. Only 1-point shots are possible, and only from inside the shooting circle.

== Equipment and uniforms ==
The ball shall be a universally accepted Netball or Association Football Size 5 and shall be supplied by the centre.

There are all different rules for Players playing:

- 1a) Players must wear a form of rubber-soled sport shoe or boot which shall be non-marking for Indoor competition and acceptable to the Netball Coordinator.
- b) Teams must wear a uniform which must be registered with the centre. It shall consist of matching shirts/tops and matching skirts/shorts (Men only).
- c) Singlet tops, jumpers or wind-cheaters will be permitted with the Netball Co-ordinators approval.
- d) All players must wear bibs identifying their court position. Players initials are to be included on both the front and back of the bibs. The initials must be a minimum of 200mm in height and clearly visible above the waist when the bibs are worn.
- 2 in the event of two teams having similar or identical uniforms, including bibs, team captains shall determine which team shall wear the neutral bibs supplied by the centre.
- e) Advertising by team sponsors is permitted on the playing bibs but shall in no way encroach upon the initials on the bibs. Advertising is permitted on any other item of the playing uniform.
- f) No jewellery shall be worn with the exception of a wedding ring or medical bracelet which must be taped to the satisfaction of the umpire.
- g) Fingernails shall be cut short or taped (band-aids and the like and electrical tape excluded) to the satisfaction of the Umpire. The Umpire may, at any time, request a player to re-tape their nails. (Gloves may be worn with the Umpires/Netball Co-Ordinators approval).

Penalty: Players in breach of proceeding requirements shall be penalised. The offending player may be removed from the court or a Three Goal penalty will be awarded to the Non-Offending team.

== International competition ==
Internationally Australia and New Zealand have contested the Trans-Tasman Shield on a number of occasions. Following this series, South Africa joined the World Indoor Netball Association, and plans were put in place for the 2001 Indoor Netball World Cup in Australia. In June 2002 Australia and England travelled to South Africa for the WINA Tri-Series. Again Open Ladies, Open Mixed and Open Men were contested at this tournament.

In 2003 New Zealand hosted the World Cup in Auckland, contested between Australia, New Zealand and South Africa. This was the first time that 21-&-Under Ladies was contested at a World Cup level, which has appeared in all subsequent Open events. Also at the 2003 World Cup, the World Indoor Netball Association introduced Over-30 Ladies, Over-30 Mixed and 18-&-Under divisions to their calendar of tournaments. In February 2004, Selected Masters & 18s Australian teams travelled to South Africa. The tour was a success and set the foundations for bi-annual tours to continue, with the next International series being held in 2006.

In 2007 a squad of netball players was selected by the (English) Indoor Netball Association (INA) to represent England at the Tri-Nations Cup, which was held in November 2007 in South Africa. Teams were entered in the U-19, Open Ladies and Open Mixed Categories. Australia won at all three levels of the tournament. Australia hosted the 2008 Indoor Netball World Cup in June on the Gold Coast in Queensland, where all four countries played the inaugural World Cup Series.

In 2010, South Africa held a Tri-Nations tournament for Open Men's, Women's and Mixed as well as U21 teams from South Africa Australia and England.

In 2012 Australia again hosted the Indoor Netball World Cup, in Brisbane, Queensland. Australia won every division (Ladies, Mens, Mixed and U21s) in both the 6-a-side and 7-a-side competitions. New Zealand teams were competitive in all divisions, dominating the grand finals.

In 2013, South Africa held the Tri-Nations Masters Series for Over 30s Mixed, Ladies and U18s Mixed and Ladies. South Africa in Australia competed in all divisions with England competing in the Ladies O30s and U18s.

== National competitions ==
=== Australia ===
In Australia there are two national championships held annually, the Open National Championships and the Aged National Championships. The Opens have four divisions: Men's, Ladies, Mixed and Under-21 Ladies, whilst the Aged Nationals have four divisions: Over 30 Ladies, Over 30 Mixed, Under 18 Mixed and the Under 18 Ladies. From these tournaments the respective All Star teams are chosen as a reflection of the best players in Australia in each division. Indoor Netball is played socially throughout Australia. Various districts, centres or arenas take part in these competitions including the Rec Club Miranda) which is one of Sydney's oldest indoor sports centres.

=== New Zealand ===
In New Zealand there are three major tournaments, held annually: the Northern Superleague competition (based in Auckland, also including Hamilton), The Central Superleague competition (based in Wellington, also including Manawatū, Taranaki and Napier and the Southern Superleague competition (based in Christchurch).

At the end of these seasons there is a National tournament which the best teams from these three competitions enter. This competition consists of a Mixed Grade, Mens Grade, Ladies Grade, Over40s Grade, Over 35s Grade, Over 30s Grade, Under 21s Grade and an Under 19s Grade. This takes place the first weekend of March each year.

=== South Africa ===
In South Africa there are three national championships held annually, the Open & Mixed National Championships, the Overs and Unders Aged National Championships and the Juniors National Championships. The Opens & Mixed have six divisions: Men's, Ladies A & B, Mixed A & B and Under-21 Ladies, whilst the Overs & Unders Aged Nationals have three divisions: Over 30 Ladies, Over 35 Ladies, Over 30 Mixed, the Under 18 and Under 19 Ladies. All Star teams are chosen as a reflection of the best performers during the tournament in each division.

=== England ===
In 2007 INA England competed in its first Tri Nation Tournament in South Africa, against South Africa and Australia. Following on from this success INA England competed in the 2008 Indoor Netball World Cup in Australia.

In 2010 INA competed in its third World Cup tournament again in South Africa with the Women's Open team gaining a silver medal and an INA England player winning 'Player of the Tournament'.

In the 2012 World Championships held in Brisbane, England's U21s squad gained silver medals.

In 2013, England competed in the Masters Tri-Nations tournament entering an over 30s ladies team and Under 18s women's squad. The over 30s ladies squad reach the semi-finals narrowly missing out on a finals place to Australia. INA England won 'Player of the Tournament' in both the Under 18 and Over 30s section for the 7s a side version.
