= Mount Rascal, Queensland =

Mount Rascal
- Suburb
- Interactive map of Mount Rascal
- Coordinates: 27.6319°S 151.9177°E
- Country: Australia
- State: Queensland
- LGA: Toowoomba Region
- Location: 11.9 km (7.4 mi) SSW of Toowoomba CBD; 138 km (86 mi) W of Brisbane

Government
  - State electorate: Condamine
  - Federal division: Groom

Area
  - Total: 7.2 km^{2} (2.8 sq mi)

Population
  - Total: 393 (2021 census)
  - Density: 54.6/km^{2} (141.4/sq mi)
- Time zone: UTC+10:00 (AEST)
- Postcode: 4350
Suburbs around Mount Rascal
Darling Heights	Darling Heights	Darling Heights
Finnie	Mount Rascal	Top Camp
Vale View	Vale View	Hodgson Vale

Mount Rascal is a rural locality in the Toowoomba Region, Queensland, Australia. In the 2021 census, Mount Rascal had a population of 393 people.

== Geography ==
The locality is 12 kilometres (7 mi) from the Toowoomba central business district.

The mountain Mount Rascal is in the west of the locality (27.594°S 152.619°E) with a peak of 734 metres (2,408 ft).

== History ==
The locality was named during the early stages of colonisation in the region, with white pastoralists calling the Aboriginal people who defended the mountain "black rascals" for their armed resistance. In 1841, a stockman named John Hill who worked at the nearby Eton Vale estate was speared at Mount Rascal, later dying from his wounds.

== Demographics ==
In the 2016 census, Mount Rascal had a population of 462 people.

In the 2021 census, Mount Rascal had a population of 393 people.

== Education ==
There are no schools in Mount Rascal. The nearest government primary schools are Drayton State School in Drayton to the north-west and Vale View State School in neighbouring Vale View to the south. The nearest government secondary school is Harristown State High School in Harristown to the north.
