= Finnie, Queensland =

Finnie
- Suburb
- Interactive map of Finnie
- Coordinates: 27.6319°S 151.8844°E
- Country: Australia
- State: Queensland
- City: Toowoomba
- LGA: Toowoomba Region
- Location: 7.2 km (4.5 mi) SW of Harristown; 10.6 km (6.6 mi) SSW of Toowoomba CBD; 138 km (86 mi) W of Brisbane

Government
  - State electorate: Condamine
  - Federal division: Groom

Area
  - Total: 6.1 km^{2} (2.4 sq mi)

Population
  - Total: 69 (2021 census)
  - Density: 11.31/km^{2} (29.3/sq mi)
- Time zone: UTC+10:00 (AEST)
- Postcode: 4350
Suburbs around Finnie
Westbrook	Drayton	Darling Heights
Westbrook	Finnie	Mount Rascal
Wyreema	Vale View	Vale View

Finnie is a rural locality in the Toowoomba Region, Queensland, Australia. In the 2021 census, Finnie had a population of 69 people.

== Geography ==
Finnie is located 11 kilometres (7 mi) from the Toowoomba central business district.

Toowoomba–Karara Road forms the western boundary, and Drayton Connection Road (which links Drayton on the Gore Highway to the New England Highway) passes through the locality from north to south.

== History ==
A railway station in the area, on the Southern railway line, was named Finnie on 29 April 1915 after a studmaster. The station closed on 2 August 1989.

== Demographics ==
In the 2016 census, Finnie had a population of 94 people.

In the 2021 census, Finnie had a population of 69 people.

== Education ==
There are no schools in Finnie. The nearest government primary schools are Drayton State School in neighbouring Drayton to the north, Wyreema State School in neighbouring Wyreema to the south-west, and Vale View State School in neighbouring Vale View to the south. The nearest government secondary school is Harristown State High School in Harristown to the north-east. There are also a number of non-government schools in Toowoomba and its suburbs.
