= Hodgson Vale, Queensland =

Hodgson Vale
- Suburb
- Interactive map of Hodgson Vale
- Coordinates: 27.6652°S 151.9511°E
- Country: Australia
- State: Queensland
- City: Toowoomba
- LGA: Toowoomba Region
- Location: 12.7 km (7.9 mi) SSW of Toowoomba CBD; 138 km (86 mi) W of Brisbane

Government
  - State electorate: Condamine
  - Federal division: Groom

Area
  - Total: 25.8 km^{2} (10.0 sq mi)

Population
  - Total: 1,444 (2021 census)
  - Density: 55.97/km^{2} (145.0/sq mi)
- Time zone: UTC+10:00 (AEST)
- Postcode: 4352
Suburbs around Hodgson Vale
Mount Rascal	Top Camp	Preston
Vale View	Hodgson Vale	Preston
Cambooya	Ramsay	Ramsay

Hodgson Vale is a rural locality in the Toowoomba Region, Queensland, Australia. In the 2021 census, Hodgson Vale had a population of 1,444 people.

== Geography ==
Hodgson Vale is 12 kilometres (7 mi) south of the city centre via New England Highway. The highway passes through the locality from the north (Top Camp) to the west (Vale View/Cambooya).

Hodgson Creek rises just to the north (Top Camp) and flows through the locality to the south-west (Cambooya). It eventually becomes a tributary of the Condamine River (part of the Murray-Darling basin) at North Branch.

== History ==
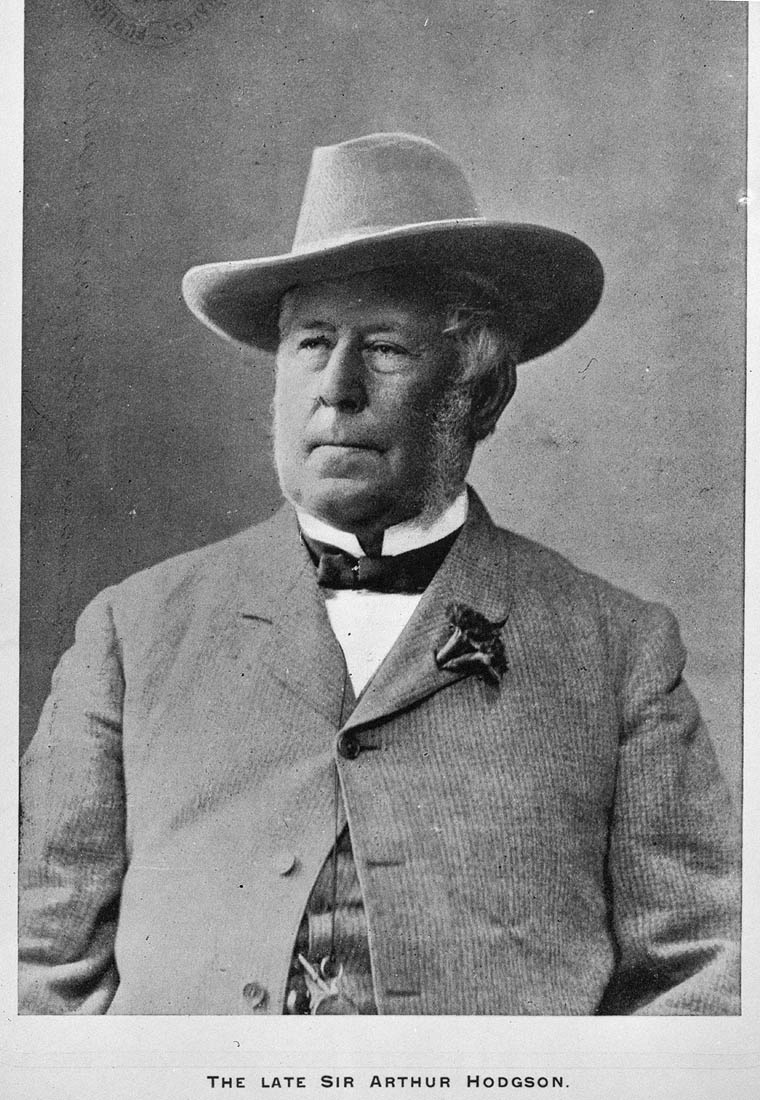
Arthur Hodgson

The locality is believed to be named for Sir Arthur Hodgson, a pioneer and member for the Legislative Assembly seat of Warrego in 1868–1869. In July 1840 he selected the Eton Vale pastoral run (the second pastoral run selected in present-day Queensland). The Eton Vale homestead was beside Hodgson Creek in the present day locality of Cambooya.

Hodgsons Vale Provisional School opened on 14 June 1906. It became Hodgsons Vale State School on 1 January 1909. It closed in 1960. It was at 161 Hodgson Vale Road (27.66479°S 151.94882°E).

== Demographics ==
In the 2016 census, Hodgson Vale had a population of 1,379 people.

In the 2021 census, Hodgson Vale had a population of 1,444 people.

== Education ==
There are no schools in Hodgson Vale. The nearest government primary schools are in neighbouring Vale View and Ramsay. The nearest government secondary schools are Centenary Heights State High School in Centenary Heights and Harristown State High School in Harristown, both in Toowoomba.
