= Greenmount War Memorial =

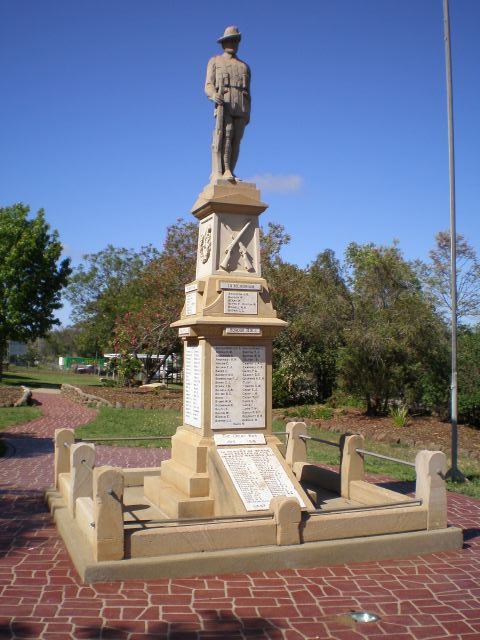
- Greenmount War Memorial

- Location within Queensland
- 27.7867°S 151.9055°E
- Location: Ramsay Street, Greenmount, Toowoomba Region, Queensland, Australia

History
- Design period: 1919–1930s (interwar period)
- Built: circa 1921

Queensland Heritage Register
- Official name: Greenmount War Memorial
- Type: state heritage (built, landscape)
- Designated: 21 October 1992
- Reference no.: 600390
- Significant period: 1921 (social); 1921–1986 (historical, fabric)
- Significant components: views from, memorial – soldier statue, trees/plantings, garden – bed/s, park/green space, flagpole/flagstaff, memorial surrounds/railings
- Builders: William Parkin Prout

Greenmount War Memorial is a heritage-listed memorial at Ramsay Street, Greenmount, Toowoomba Region, Queensland, Australia. It was unveiled 11 December 1922. It was added to the Queensland Heritage Register on 21 October 1992.

== History ==
The Greenmount War Memorial was erected 1922, originally located near the railway station in Pilton Street, the main road between Toowoomba and Warwick. The mason for the monument was William Parkin Prout of Warwick, who was also responsible for monuments in Allora and Killarney.

Greenmount was one of a number of small localities which developed as farming areas when portions of the Eton Vale, Felton and Pilton pastoral estates were resumed by the Government for closer settlement from the late 1860s to the 1880s. Greenmount developed as a township centred on the Greenmount railway station and local store, and grew during the early 1900s. Although the newly formed Cambooya Shire Council decided to erect an Honour Roll for the soldiers of the area in 1915, it was not until January 1921 that the Council decided the money raised should go towards the erection of the Shire memorial at Greenmount. The war memorial was unveiled on Monday 11 December 1922 by the Governor of Queensland, Sir Matthew Nathan.

In August 1952 the Council took over the trusteeship of the monument from the Greenmount Progress Association. It was also around this time that the Council donated money towards having the names of Second World War servicemen included on the monument.

In 1985 the Greenmount Bicentennial Memorial Park was established in Ramsay Street adjoining the Returned Soldiers Hall. The monument, which is believed to be the only intact digger monument by Prout in Queensland, was re-sited in the park which was officially opened in February 1986.

== Description ==
The Greenmount War Memorial (c. 1921) consists of a "Digger" monument centrally located in a memorial park (c. 1985) which slopes gently to the west. The monument comprises a lifesize grey sandstone Digger statue surmounting a tall, finely carved sandstone blocked pedestal which is about twice the height of the statue. It is encircled with garden beds, shrubs and small palms, and is impressively set against the backdrop of the adjacent valley and hills. A tall steel flagstaff is located to the west of the monument.

The monument rests on a concrete platform encircled with small sandstone newels and a steel rail. The stepped sandstone base has a sloping face to the north which bears a leaded marble plaque, and is inscribed with the mason's name. The lower portion of the pedestal has leaded marble honour rolls on each face, and a floriated cornice. The upper portion has curved panels in relief bearing small marble "in memoriam" plaques, surmounted by a white sandstone tapering block with wreaths and crossed guns in relief. This section is topped with a small pediment and steps, upon which the statue is mounted. The grey sandstone Digger statue faces the road, standing with his right foot forward, holding the top of the rifle barrel in his right hand.

The monument in its park setting with a backdrop of hills and valley is an aesthetic contribution to the Greenmount townscape, and the monument itself is in good condition.

== Heritage listing ==
Greenmount War Memorial was listed on the Queensland Heritage Register on 21 October 1992 having satisfied the following criteria.

The place is important in demonstrating the evolution or pattern of Queensland's history.

The Greenmount War Memorial is important in demonstrating the pattern of Queensland's history, as evidence of an era of widespread expression of Australian patriotism and nationalism, during and following the First World War.

The place is important in demonstrating the principal characteristics of a particular class of cultural places.

As a "digger" statue, it demonstrates the principal characteristics of a commemorative structure erected as an enduring record of a major historical event.

The place is important because of its aesthetic significance.

It exhibits aesthetic characteristics which are valued by the community, in particular the fine craft work of the sandstone carving, and its park setting with a backdrop of hills and valley, which makes a strong aesthetic contribution to the Greenmount townscape.

The place has a strong or special association with a particular community or cultural group for social, cultural or spiritual reasons.

The place has a strong association with the community as evidence of the impact of a major historical event.
