= Top Camp, Queensland =

Top Camp
- Suburb
- Interactive map of Top Camp
- Coordinates: 27.6319°S 151.9344°E
- Country: Australia
- State: Queensland
- City: Toowoomba
- LGA: Toowoomba Region
- Location: 8.5 km (5.3 mi) S of Toowoomba CBD; 134 km (83 mi) W of Brisbane

Government
  - State electorate: Condamine
  - Federal division: Groom

Area
  - Total: 4.8 km^{2} (1.9 sq mi)

Population
  - Total: 902 (2021 census)
  - Density: 187.9/km^{2} (487/sq mi)
- Time zone: UTC+10:00 (AEST)
- Postcode: 4350
Suburbs around Top Camp
Darling Heights	Kearneys Spring	Kearneys Spring
Mount Rascal	Top Camp	Preston
Mount Rascal	Hodgson Vale	Preston

Top Camp is a locality in the Toowoomba Region, Queensland, Australia. In the 2021 census, Top Camp had a population of 902 people.

== Geography ==
Top Camp is 9 kilometres (6 mi) from the Toowoomba city centre via the New England Highway. It is immediately to the west of the Great Dividing Range and is at an elevation of 580 to 630 metres (1,900 to 2,070 ft).The highway passes through the eastern part of the locality from north (Kearney Springs) to south (Hodgson Vale).

The land use is rural residential.

== History ==
Top Camp State School opened on 17 June 1947 and closed on 13 June 1960.

== Demographics ==
In the 2006 census, Top Camp had a population of 1.485 people.

In the 2016 census, Top Camp had a population of 852 people.

In the 2021 census, Top Camp had a population of 902 people.

== Education ==
There are no schools in Top Camp. The nearest government primary schools are Darling Heights State School in Darling Heights, Drayton State School in Drayton, and Middle Ridge State School in Middle Ridge. The nearest government secondary schools are Harristown State High School in Harristown and Centenary Heights State High School in Centenary Heights.
