= East Greenmount, Queensland =

East Greenmount
- Town
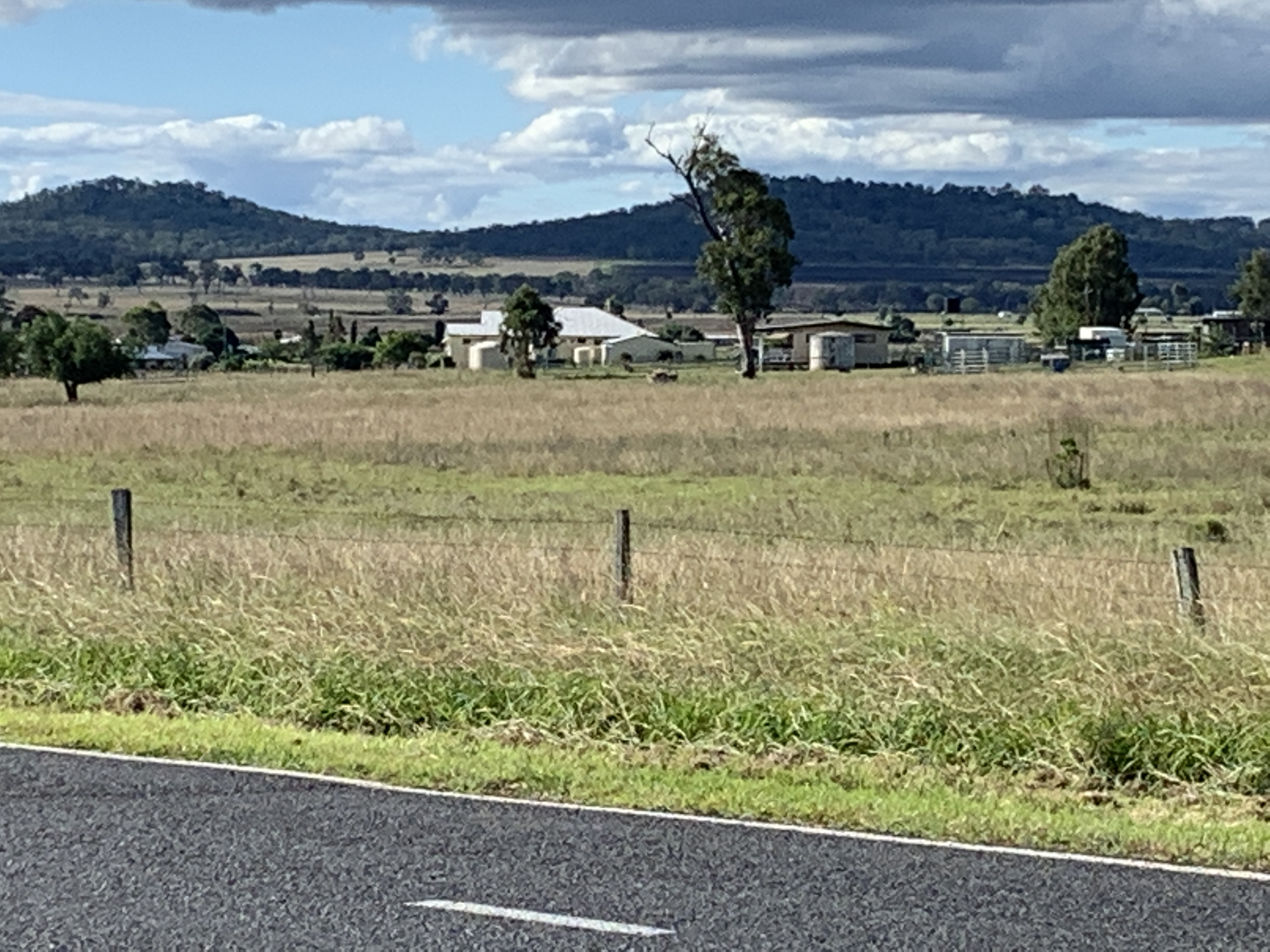
- East Greenmount farmland with the Great Dividing Range in the east, 2022

- Interactive map of East Greenmount
- Coordinates: 27.7802°S 151.9405°E
- Country: Australia
- State: Queensland
- LGA: Toowoomba Region
- Location: 22.7 km (14.1 mi) N of Clifton; 29 km (18 mi) S of Toowoomba; 154 km (96 mi) WSW of Brisbane

Government
  - State electorate: Condamine
  - Federal division: Groom

Area
  - Total: 42.7 km^{2} (16.5 sq mi)

Population
  - Total: 351 (2021 census)
  - Density: 8.220/km^{2} (21.29/sq mi)
- Time zone: UTC+10:00 (AEST)
- Postcode: 4359
Localities around East Greenmount
Cambooya	Ramsay	Ramsay
Greenmount	East Greenmount	Budgee
Nobby	Nobby	Ascot

East Greenmount is a rural town and locality in the Toowoomba Region, Queensland, Australia. In the 2021 census, the locality of East Greenmount had a population of 351 people.

== Geography ==
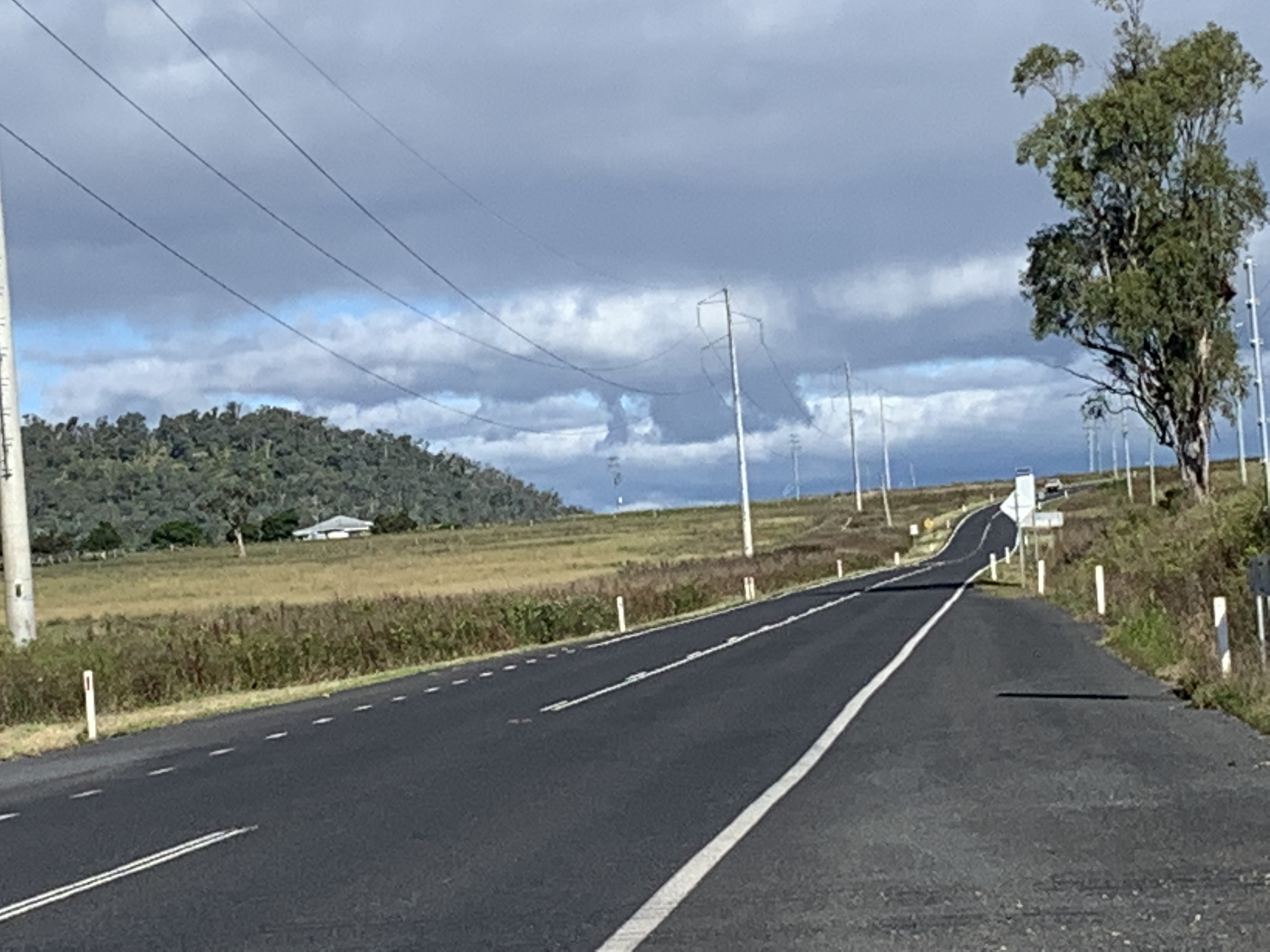
New England Highway in East Greenmount, 2022

East Greenmount is on the Darling Downs and, as its name suggests, to the immediate east of the locality of Greenmount. The town is in west of the locality at the junction of the New England Highway and the Greenmount Clifton Road.

The New England Highway enters the locality from the south (Nobby), passes immediately east of the town and exits to the north-west (Cambooya).

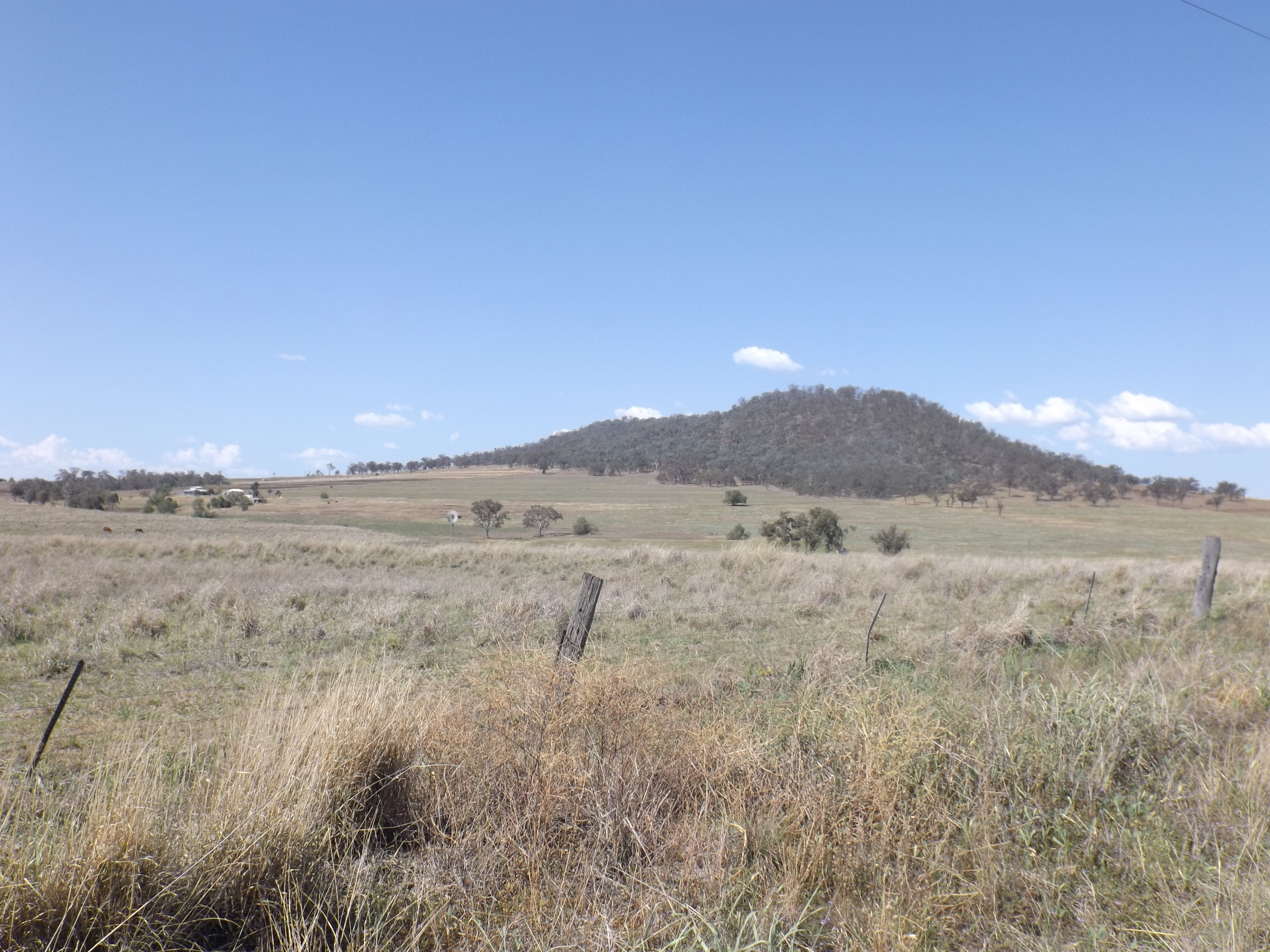
Mount Sibley, 2014

Mount Sibley is an isolated peak in the south-east of East Greenmount (27.8012°S 151.9648°E), rising to 676 metres (2,218 ft) above sea level. The mountain was named after James Sibley, a pastoralist and publican, who leased the Clifton pastoral run in the early 1840s.

Emu Creek commences at the northern boundary of the locality (formed by the confluence of Elliott Creek and Allan Gully in Ramsay) and exits to the west (Greenmount). It is a tributary of Hodgson Creek, which is a tributary of the Condamine River, part of the Murray–Darling basin.

== History ==
The name Greenmount comes from a farm name used by Donald Mackintosh who represented the area as a Member of the Queensland Legislative Assembly for Cambooya from 1899 to 1912 and Pittsworth from 1912 to 1915.

Emu Creek State School opened on 31 May 1875. It takes its name from the creek which flows through the locality and not from the locality of Emu Creek (101 kilometres (63 mi) further north.

Until 13 May 2005, the official name for the locality was Greenmount East.

== Demographics ==
In the 2016 census, the locality of East Greenmount had a population of 361 people.

In the 2021 census, the locality of East Greenmount had a population of 351 people.

== Education ==
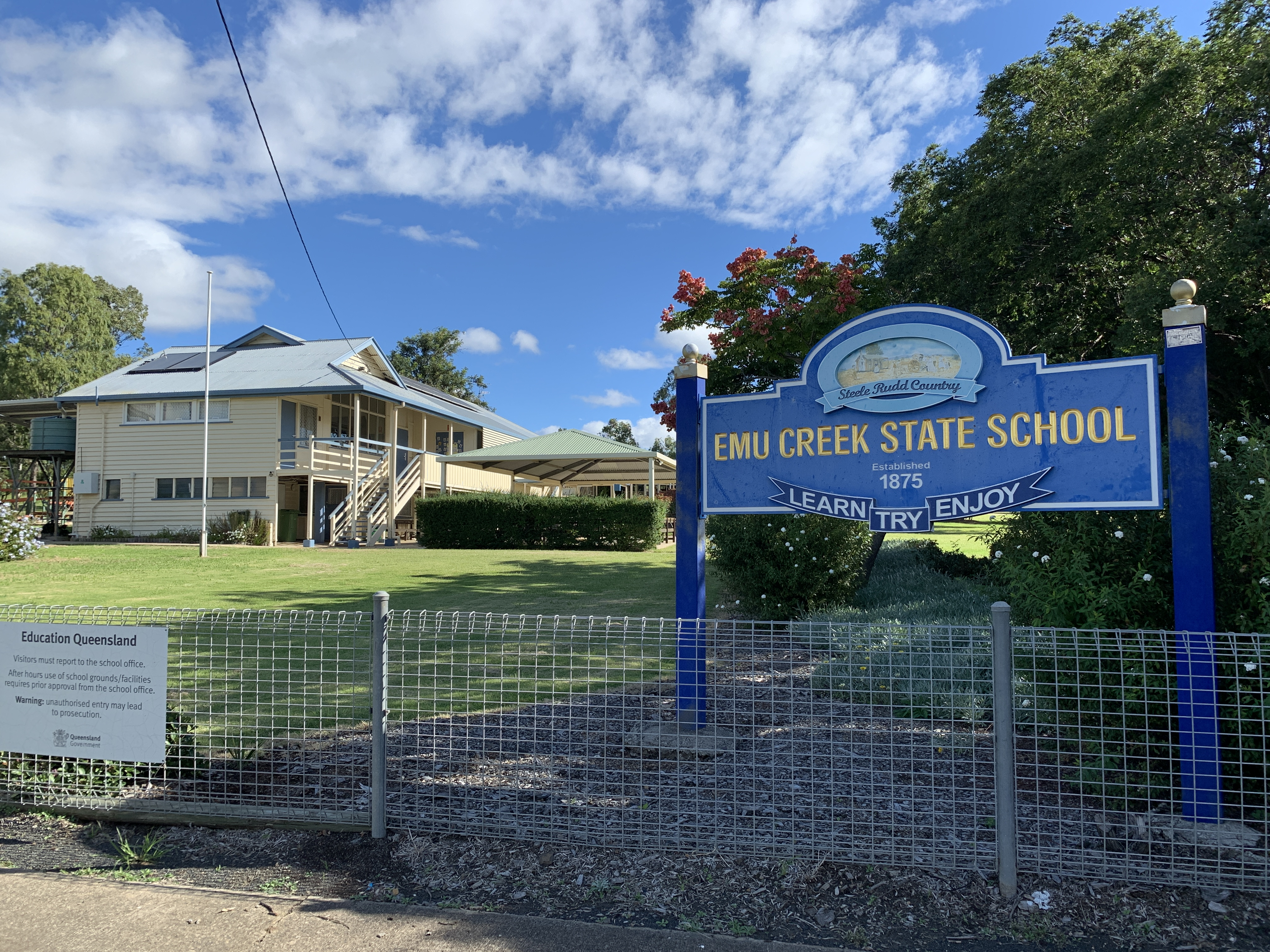
Emu Creek State School, 2022

Emu Creek State School is a government primary (Prep–6) school for boys and girls at 14534 New England Highway (27.7833°S 151.9448°E). In 2017, the school had an enrolment of 24 students with 2 teachers and 5 non-teaching staff (2 full-time equivalent). In 2018, the school had an enrolment of 29 students with 3 teachers (2 full-time equivalent) and 5 non-teaching staff (3 full-time equivalent).

There are no secondary schools in East Greenmount. The nearest government secondary schools are Clifton State High School in Clifton to the south and two schools in Toowoomba to the north: Harristown State High School in Harristown and Centenary Heights State High School in Centenary Heights.

== Facilities ==
Greenmount Waste Facility is at 123 Falknau Road (27.7655°S 151.9269°E). It is operated by the Toowoomba Regional Council.

== Amenities ==
Steele Rudd Park is at 172 Steele Rudd Road (27.7860°S 151.9624°E). It is dedicated to the family of Steele Rudd and features replica historical buildings.
