= Darling Heights, Queensland =

Rural locality in Queensland, Australia

Darling Heights
- Suburb
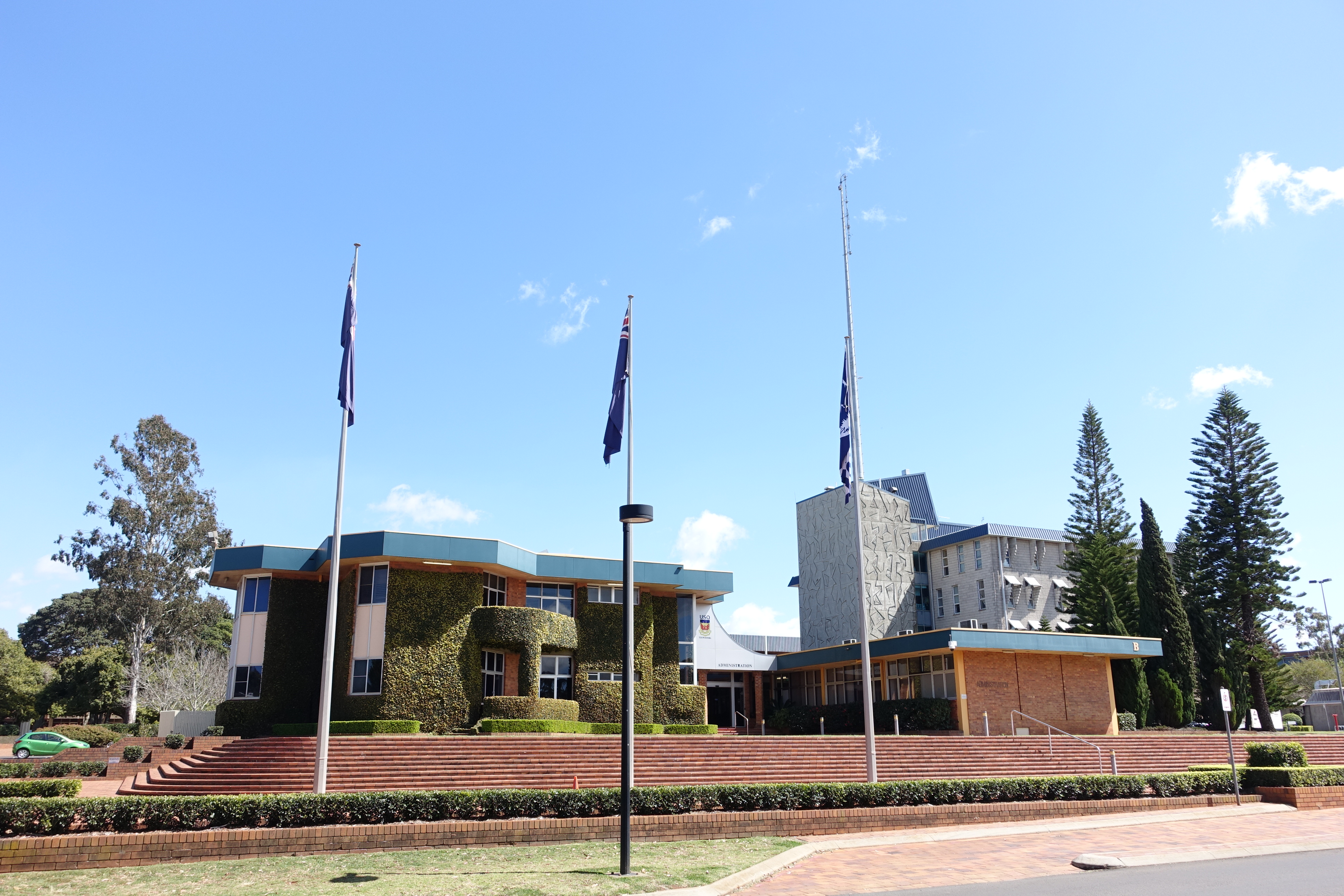
- University of South Queensland's Toowoomba campus at Darling Heights, 2015

- Interactive map of Darling Heights
- Coordinates: 27.6055°S 151.9230°E
- Country: Australia
- State: Queensland
- City: Toowoomba
- LGA: Toowoomba Region
- Location: 5.0 km (3.1 mi) SSW of Toowoomba CBD; 132 km (82 mi) W of Brisbane

Government
  - State electorates: Condamine; Toowoomba South
  - Federal division: Groom

Area
  - Total: 6.0 km^{2} (2.3 sq mi)

Population
  - Total: 5,157 (2021 census)
  - Density: 860/km^{2} (2,226/sq mi)
- Time zone: UTC+10:00 (AEST)
- Postcode: 4350
Suburbs around Darling Heights
Drayton	Harristown	Kearneys Spring
Drayton	Darling Heights	Kearneys Spring
Finnie	Mount Rascal	Top Camp

Darling Heights is a rural residential locality in the Toowoomba Region, Queensland, Australia. In the 2021 census, Darling Heights had a population of 5,157 people.

== History ==
Darling Heights was named by the Queensland Place Names Board on 1 January 1966 with boundaries confirmed on 1 June 1981. The name was originally proposed to be College Heights to reflect the new university college that was being planned for the area, but, when it was expected that the college would be called the Darling Downs Institute of Technology, the name Darling Heights was preferred. In 1992, the institute was renamed the University of Southern Queensland.

Darling Heights State School opened on 29 January 1980.

== Demographics ==
In the 2016 census, Darling Heights had a population of 5,192 people. Aboriginal and Torres Strait Islander people made up 3.9% of the population. 62.9% of people were born in Australia. The most common countries of birth were India 6.8% and Iraq 4.0%. 65.8% of people only spoke English at home. Other languages spoken at home included Arabic 5.4%, Telugu 2.7% and Mandarin 2.1%. The most common responses for religion were Catholic 20.2%, No Religion 18.6%, Anglican 11.8% and Islam 9.2%.

In the 2021 census, Darling Heights had a population of 5,157 people.

== Education ==
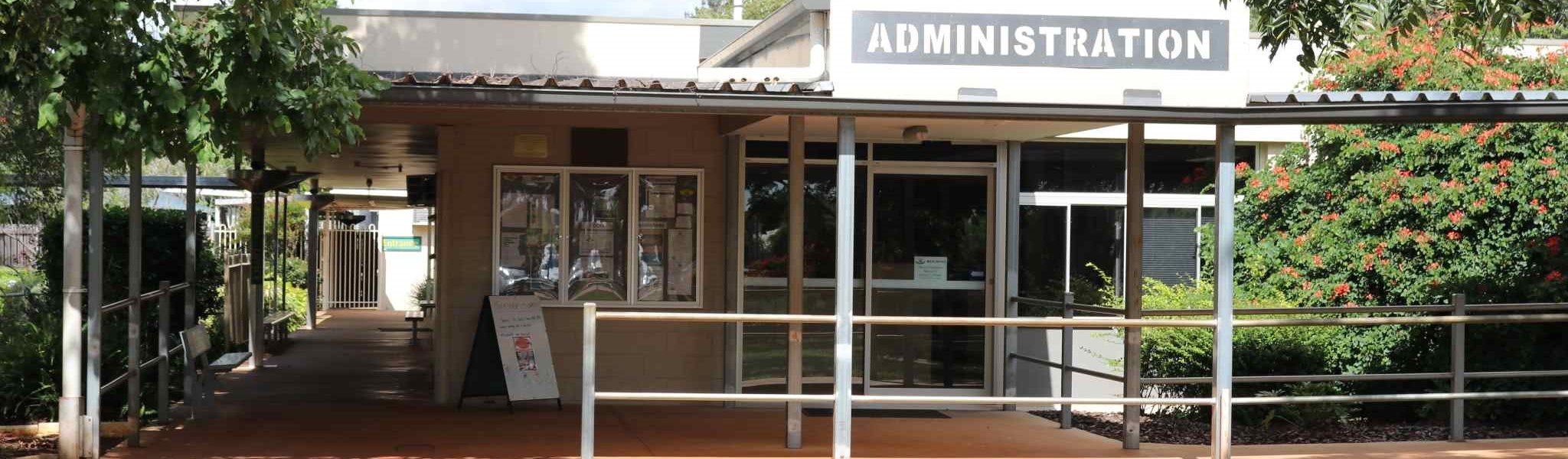
Darling Heights State School, 2024

Darling Heights State School is a government primary (Prep–6) school for boys and girls at Wuth Street (27.5974°S 151.9323°E). In 2017, the school had an enrolment of 690 students with 57 teachers (53 full-time equivalent) and 49 non-teaching staff (33 full-time equivalent). It includes a special education program and an intensive English language program.

There are no secondary schools in Darling Heights. The nearest government secondary school is Harristown State High School in neighbouring Harristown to the north.

The University of Southern Queensland is a campus in Darling Heights; it was the first campus developed for the university.

== Attractions ==
- Ju Raku En Japanese Garden, a 4.5 hectare traditionally designed, Japanese stroll garden.
