= Wyreema, Queensland =

Wyreema
- Town
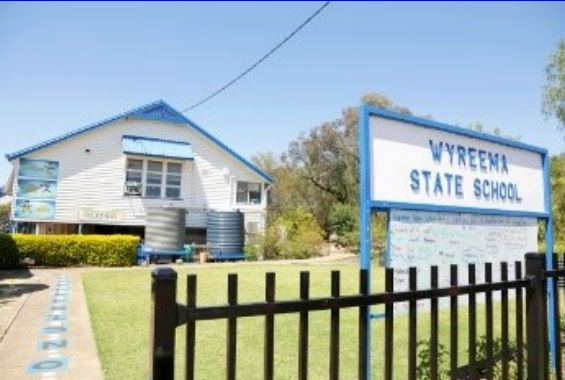
- Wyreema State School, 2021

- Interactive map of Wyreema
- Coordinates: 27.6583°S 151.8605°E
- Country: Australia
- State: Queensland
- LGA: Toowoomba Region
- Location: 25.4 km (15.8 mi) SW of Toowoomba CBD; 145 km (90 mi) W of Brisbane

Government
  - State electorate: Groom

Area
  - Total: 40.5 km^{2} (15.6 sq mi)

Population
  - Total: 2,076 (2021 census)
  - Density: 51.26/km^{2} (132.76/sq mi)
- Time zone: UTC+10:00 (AEST)
- Postcode: 4352
Localities around Wyreema
Athol	Westbrook	Finnie
Umbiram	Wyreema	Vale View
Cambooya	Cambooya	Cambooya

Wyreema is a rural town and locality in the Toowoomba Region, Queensland, Australia. In the 2021 census, the locality of Wyreema had a population of 2,076 people.

== Geography ==
Toowoomba–Karara Road passes through the locality and town from north to south, and Umbiram Road / Newman Road (which links Southbrook on the Gore Highway to the New England Highway) runs from west to east.

The Southern railway line enters the locality from the north-east (Finnie) and exits to the west (Umbiram).

== History ==
The town takes its name from the Wyreema railway station on the Southern railway line; the origins of that name are unclear but it's not an Aboriginal name.

The Southern railway line opened from Gowrie Junction to Hendon on 11 March 1869. Although it passed through present day Wyreema, there was no railway station in the area. On 19 September 1887, the Beauaraba branch railway line branched from the new Beauaraba Junction railway station (27.6531°S 151.8567°E) on the Southern line to Pittsworth (later extending to Millmerran). In October 1893, Beauaraba Junction railway station was renamed Wyreema railway station.

Wyreema Provisional School opened on 21 February 1895. In 1904, it became Wyreema State School.

In 1915, the opening of the Drayton Deviation from Toowoomba via Drayton to Wyreema reduced the distance from Toowoomba to Wyreema and beyond by 15 kilometres (9.3 mi).

A suburban rail motor service from Toowoomba commenced in May 1917. It was extended south to Cambooya and north (from Toowoomba) to Willowburn (a railway station on the Western line at the Harlaxton, Cranley, Rockville tripoint) in 1918. These services ceased around 1923.

== Demographics ==
In the 2016 census, the locality of Wyreema had a population of 1,834 people.

In the 2021 census, the locality of Wyreema had a population of 2,076 people.

== Education ==
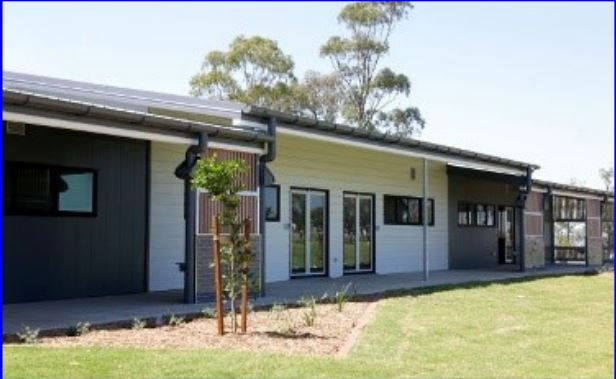
Wyreema State School, 2021

Wyreema State School is a government primary (Prep-6) school for boys and girls at 12 High Street (27.6586°S 151.8550°E). In 2018, the school had an enrolment of 160 students with 14 teachers (10 full-time equivalent) and 9 non-teaching staff (5 full-time equivalent).

There are no secondary schools in Wyreema. The nearest government secondary school is Harristown State High School in Harristown in Toowoomba to the north-east.

== Amenities ==
Library services in Wyreema are provided by the Toowoomba Regional Council's mobile library service. The van visits Wyreema State School every Friday.
