= Vale View, Queensland =

Vale View
- Suburb
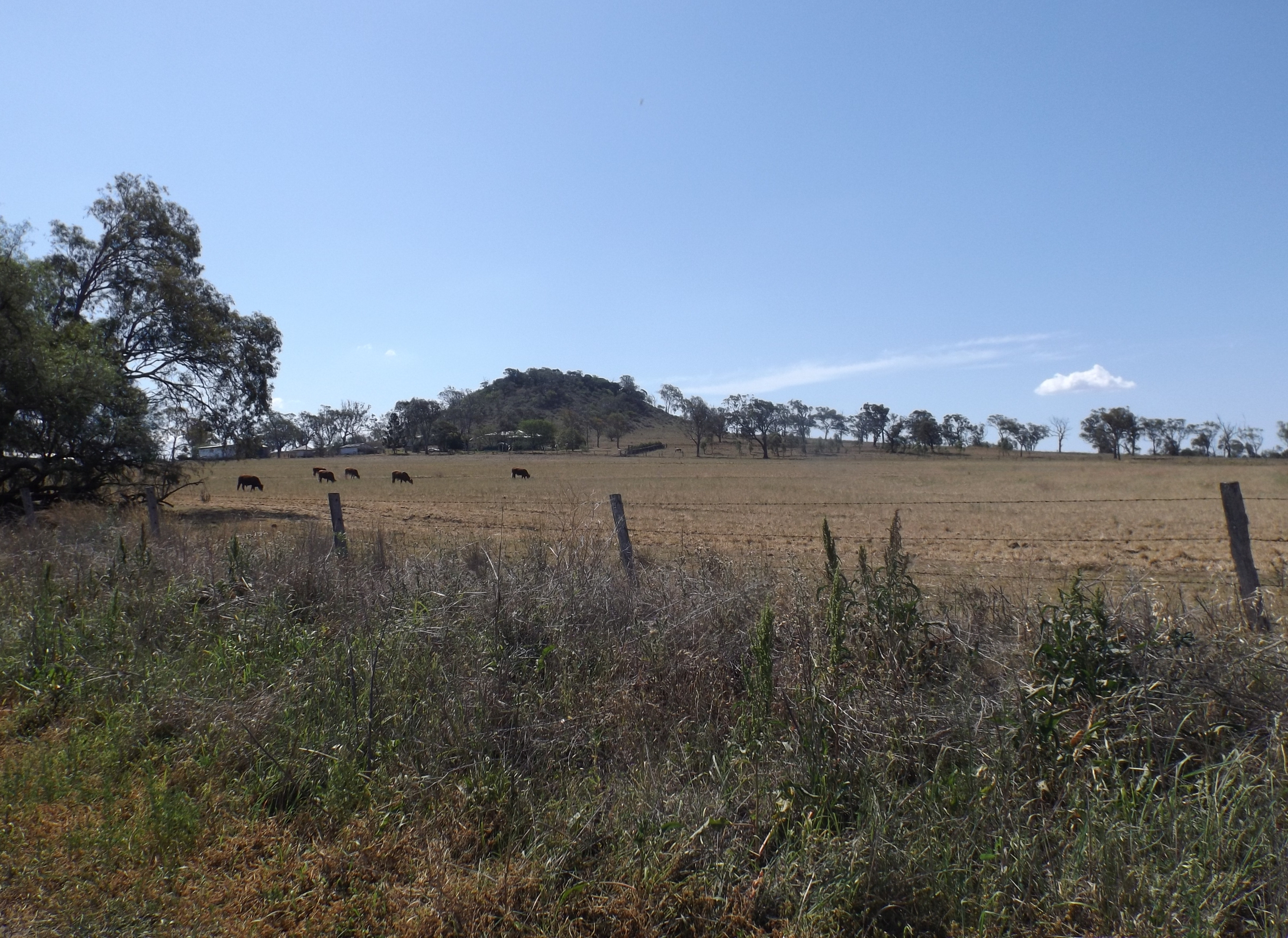
- Paddocks along Franks Road at Vale View, 2014

- Interactive map of Vale View
- Coordinates: 27.6608°S 151.9038°E
- Country: Australia
- State: Queensland
- City: Toowoomba
- LGA: Toowoomba Region
- Location: 15 km (9.3 mi) SSW of Toowoomba CBD; 141 km (88 mi) W of Brisbane

Government
  - State electorate: Condamine
  - Federal division: Groom

Area
  - Total: 14.5 km^{2} (5.6 sq mi)

Population
  - Total: 454 (2021 census)
  - Density: 31.31/km^{2} (81.1/sq mi)
- Time zone: UTC+10:00 (AEST)
- Postcode: 4352
Suburbs around Vale View
Wyreema	Finnie	Mount Rascal
Wyreema	Vale View	Hodgson Vale
Cambooya	Cambooya	Cambooya

Vale View is a rural locality in the Toowoomba Region, Queensland, Australia. In the 2021 census, Vale View had a population of 454 people.

== Geography ==
The Southern railway line marks a small section of the northwest boundary of Vale View. The New England Highway is aligned with the southeast boundary.

Shepperd is a neighbourhood (27.65°S 151.8833°E) around the former Shepperd railway station on the Southern railway line (27.6432°S 151.8794°E).

There is an area of rural residential development in the north of the locality on the southern slope of Mount Shepperd. The rest of the locality is used for a mixture of cropping and grazing on native vegetation.

== History ==
The name Shepperd is a railway station name, assigned by the Queensland Railways Department on 29 April 1915. The name was suggested by the Drayton Shire Council after Samuel Shepperd, the manager of Glengallan pastoral property.

In December 1930, tenders were called to relocate the Pickanjinnie school building to Vale View. Vale View State School opened on 2 March 1931.

== Demographics ==
In the 2016 census, Vale View had a population of 472 people.

In the 2021 census, Vale View had a population of 454 people.

== Education ==
Vale View State School is a government primary (Prep-6) school for boys and girls at 873 Drayton Connection Road (27.6605°S 151.8972°E). In 2018, the school had an enrolment of 86 students with 7 teachers (6 full-time equivalent) and 9 non-teaching staff (4 full-time equivalent).

There are no secondary schools in Vale View. The nearest government secondary schools are Harristown State High School in Harristown to the north and Centenary Heights State High School in Centenary Heights to the north-east, both of them in Toowoomba.
