= Cambooya, Queensland =

Cambooya
- Town
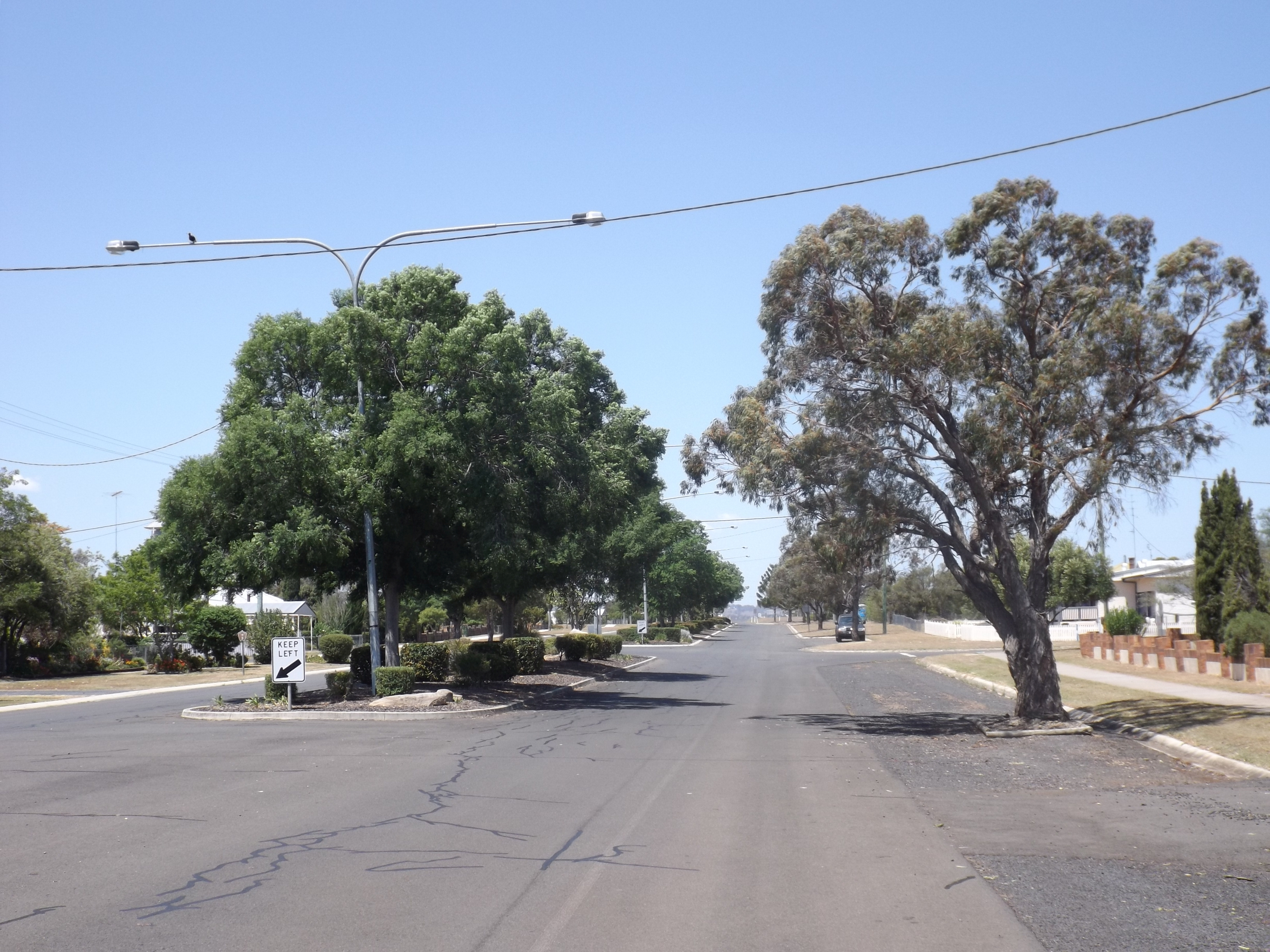
- Eton Street, 2014

- Interactive map of Cambooya
- Coordinates: 27.7077°S 151.8633°E
- Country: Australia
- State: Queensland
- LGA: Toowoomba Region
- Location: 21.0 km (13.0 mi) S of Toowoomba CBD; 29.2 km (18.1 mi) N of Clifton; 31.6 km (19.6 mi) E of Pittsworth; 152 km (94 mi) WSW of Brisbane

Government
  - State electorate: Condamine
  - Federal division: Groom

Area
  - Total: 118.6 km^{2} (45.8 sq mi)
- Elevation: 465 m (1,526 ft)

Population
  - Total: 2,260 (2021 census)
  - Density: 19.06/km^{2} (49.35/sq mi)
- Time zone: UTC+10:00 (AEST)
- Postcode: 4358
Localities around Cambooya
| Umbiram | Wyreema; Vale View | Hodgson Vale |
| Southbrook | Cambooya | Ramsay |
| Felton | Greenmount | East Greenmount |

Cambooya is a rural town and locality in the Toowoomba Region, Queensland, Australia. In the 2021 census, the locality of Cambooya had a population of 2,260 people.

== Geography ==
Cambooya is in the Darling Downs region, 148 kilometres (92 mi) west of the state capital, Brisbane.

Outside of the town, the land use is a mix of dry and irrigated crop-growing and grazing on native vegetation.

== History ==
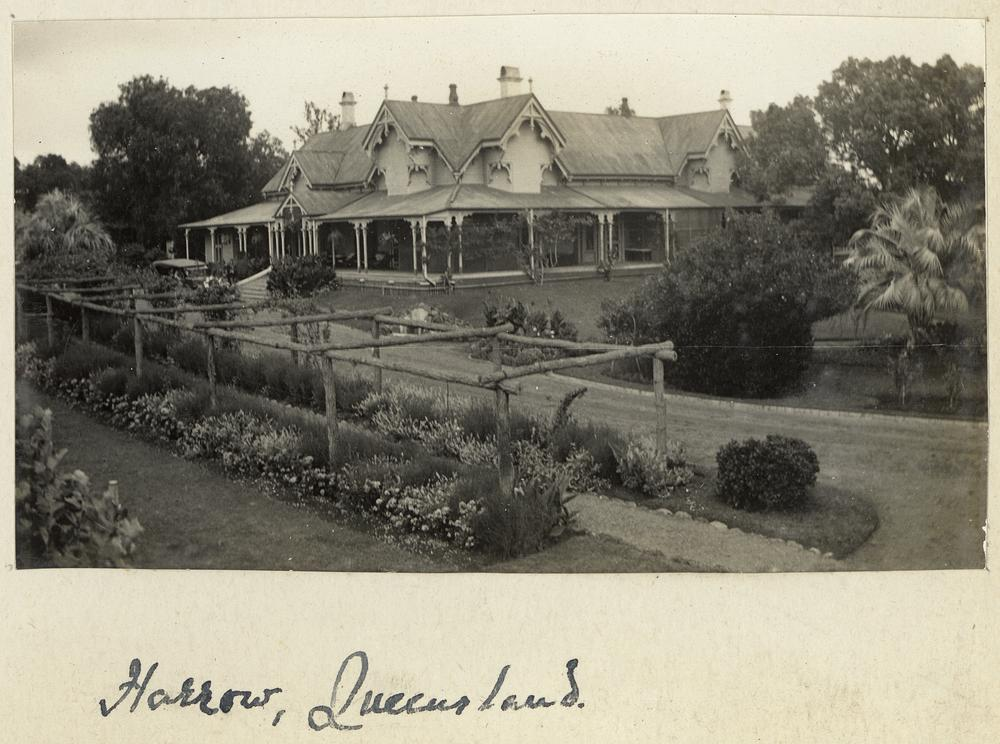
Harrow homestead

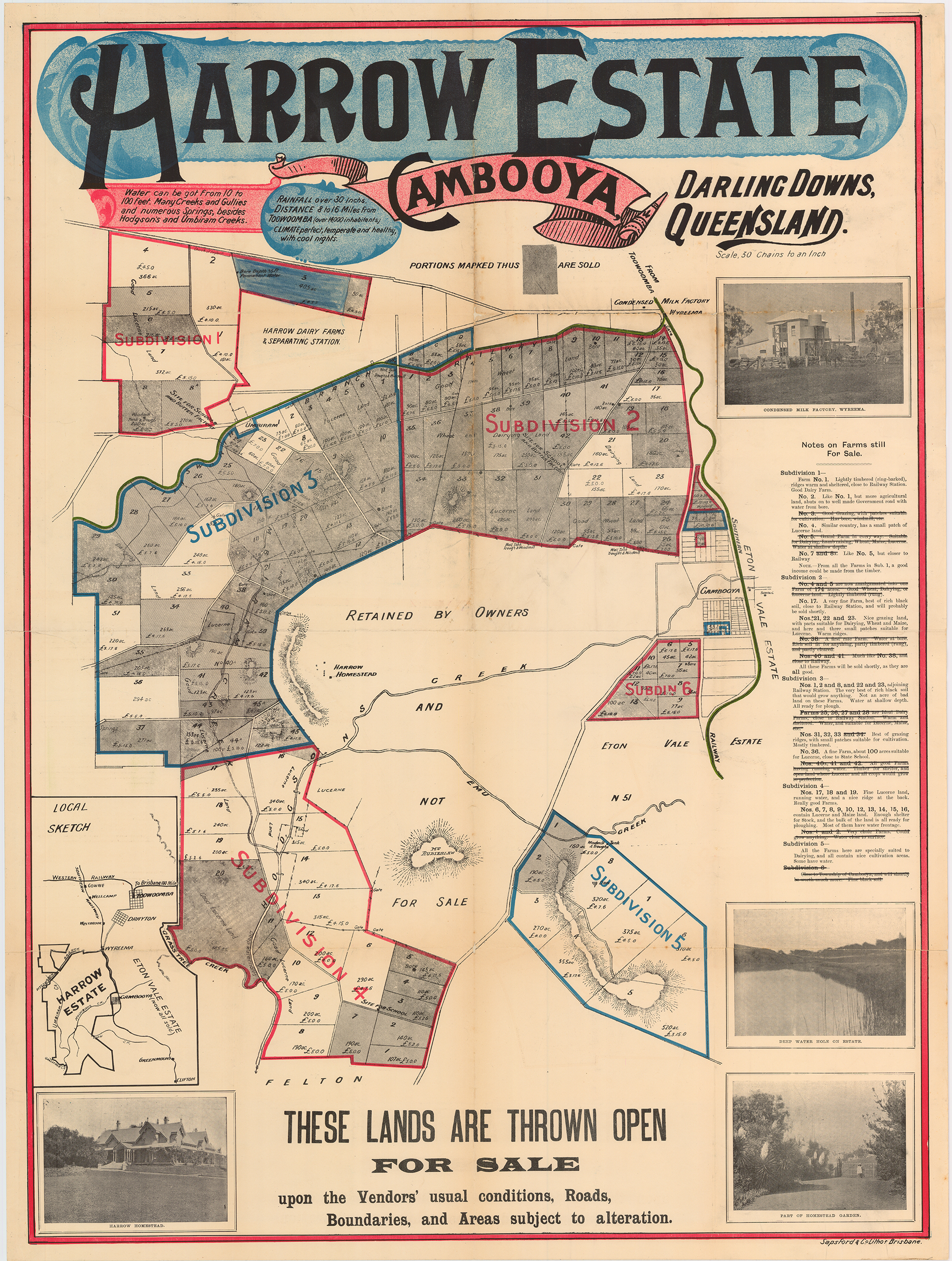
Land sale around Cambooya, circa 1910

European settlement of the area dates from 1840, when Arthur Hodgson chose 65,000 acres (26,305 ha) of prime land, which he named Eton Vale. In 1843 the New South Wales Commissioner of Crown Lands, Christopher Rolleston, carried out a survey and reserved a site on Eton Vale for a township. He named it Cambooya. The origin of the name is unclear. It has been suggested it is a rendering of the Aboriginal word yambuya meaning tubers growing in a water hole. Another theory is that it derives from the Aboriginal word kambuya meaning an egg, skull or head or that it means reeds and rushes, or many winds.

Cambooya was, in its early years, the railway, postal, and general centre of two properties named after two public schools of England, Eton and Harrow. Hodgson had attended Eton, and Ramsay had attended Harrow. Hodgson resisted the formation of a township, and no development occurred until 1868, when the Cambooya railway station (27.7066°S 151.8632°E) was built as the Southern railway line was extended from Toowoomba to Warwick.

Cambooya Post Office opened on 12 March 1869. It was co-located with the railway station.

In 1877, 6,500 acres (2,600 ha) of land was resumed from the Eton Vale pastoral run to establish smaller farms. The land was offered for selection on 17 April 1877.

Cambooya Provisional School opened on 30 October 1882, with 12 students from four local families. Due to growing attendance and an increased population caused by the railway, the school was moved and a building was erected in 1899 at the current school site. On 1 January 1909 it became Cambooya State School, resulting in a new state school building being built in 1910 with the provisional school building then becoming the teacher's residence in 1910.

Eton Vale school was originally a private school on Eton Vale Station, three and a half miles from the Cambooya railway station. Most children who attended the school in 1890 were girls and infants, as they could not travel to Cambooya School with any regularity and the black soil was impassable in wet weather. Eton Vale Provisional School was established circa 1891. Eton Vale became a half-time school with Preston in 1925; Preston School closed shortly after and Eton Vale school closed in 1929.

Harrow State School opened on 24 June 1909 and closed in 1927. Its localtion was describe as "via Cambooya".

All Saints Anglican Church was consecrated on 1 November 1904 by Bishop of Newcastle Jack Stretch. Described as "substantial and ornamental", the church building was 40 by 26 feet (12.2 by 7.9 m) with 13 feet (4.0 m) high walls.

The Darling Downs, including Cambooya, was well known for the production of cheese and other dairy products in the first half of the 20th century. For example, the Ramsay Cheese Factory, during the fourteen months prior to the end of 1906, made 248,686 lb or 111 tons of cheese from 273,003 gallons of milk. By 1912 there were butter an/or cheese factories at Allora, Cambooya, Clifton, Crows Nest, Dalby, Goombungee, Greenmount, Inglewood, Jandowae, Leyburn, Oakey, Pittsworth, Tannymorel, Toowoomba and Warwick. In the late 1930s the Downs' dairy industry peaked at 6500 farms and over 200,000 milking cows.

On Wednesday 6 June 1906 the Cambooya Presbyterian Church was officially opened by the Moderator the Right Reverend James McQueen. The church was 30 by 20 feet (9.1 by 6.1 m) with a porch. It was made of wood by contractor Mr Smith of Toowoomba.

The post office, railway station building and goods shed were destroyed in a fire in the early hours of the morning on 7 July 1908. A new post office was built in 1909 at an estimated cost of £1050.

Nunkulla State School opened in 1912 "via Cambooya" and was closed on 6 December 1959, and the building was transported to Cambooya to become an additional classroom at Cambooya State School. The "new" building was officially opened in December 1960. A new building was constructed in 1985 and officially opened on 3 August 1985 by Tony Elliott, Member for Cunningham. In 1985 the school was officially given six allotments of land, now called Johnson Oval. This oval is used today for cricket, soccer, and athletics. By 1990 there were 104 students and 25 pre-school students enrolled, plus a teaching staff of six teachers and three teacher-aides. Early in 2005 there was an officially opened covered area. Stuart Copeland, Member of Parliament (MP) congratulated the school community for constructing a useful covered area for eating lunches and undercover activities. The school celebrated its centenary in 1982 and 125 years of education at Cambooya State School in 2007.

In April 1914, the Anglican Church at Cambooya was destroyed by cyclonic winds. As reported in the Darling Downs Gazette, "the church was built by the residents some years ago, and was one of the centres of religious life in that small community. A stained glass window in the church was the gift of Sir Arthur Hodgson in memory of the Hodgson family who did much for the Downs and for Queensland; the walls of the little church were beautifully decorated. The seats were tastefully decorated, and the organ, recently paid for, was a very fine instrument. All have been destroyed." The church was rebuilt with funds raised by the community. The foundation stone of the new building was laid on Wednesday 4 November 1914 by Archdeacon Henry Le Fanu, a week before the opening of the new Catholic church. On Sunday 7 November 1915 the new All Saints Anglican Church was officially dedicated by Archbishop St Clair Donaldson.

In October 1913 local Catholics decided to erect a Catholic church in Cambooya. On Sunday 9 August 1914 local priest Father O'Connell performed the stamp capping ceremony for the new church. The church was designed by Harry Marks of Toowoomba and the contractors were Messrs Heiner and Olsen. The Cambooya Catholic Church was officially opened on 9 November 1914 by Archbishop James Duhig, before a crowd of about 600. On Sunday 25 April (ANZAC Day) 1965 a new brick church building was officially opened and blessed by Bishop of Toowoomba William Brennan. The new church is adjacent to the old wooden church. At the centenary celebrations in 2014, descendants of the men who helped build the church were among the crowd for the celebration.

A suburban rail motor service from Toowoomba along the Southern railway line commenced in May 1917, running to Wyreema, 10 miles away. It was extended to Cambooya and to Willowburn in 1918. They ceased around 1923.

The Cambooya War Memorial was unveiled on Sunday 9 October 1921 by William Bebbington, the local Member of the Queensland Legislative Assembly.

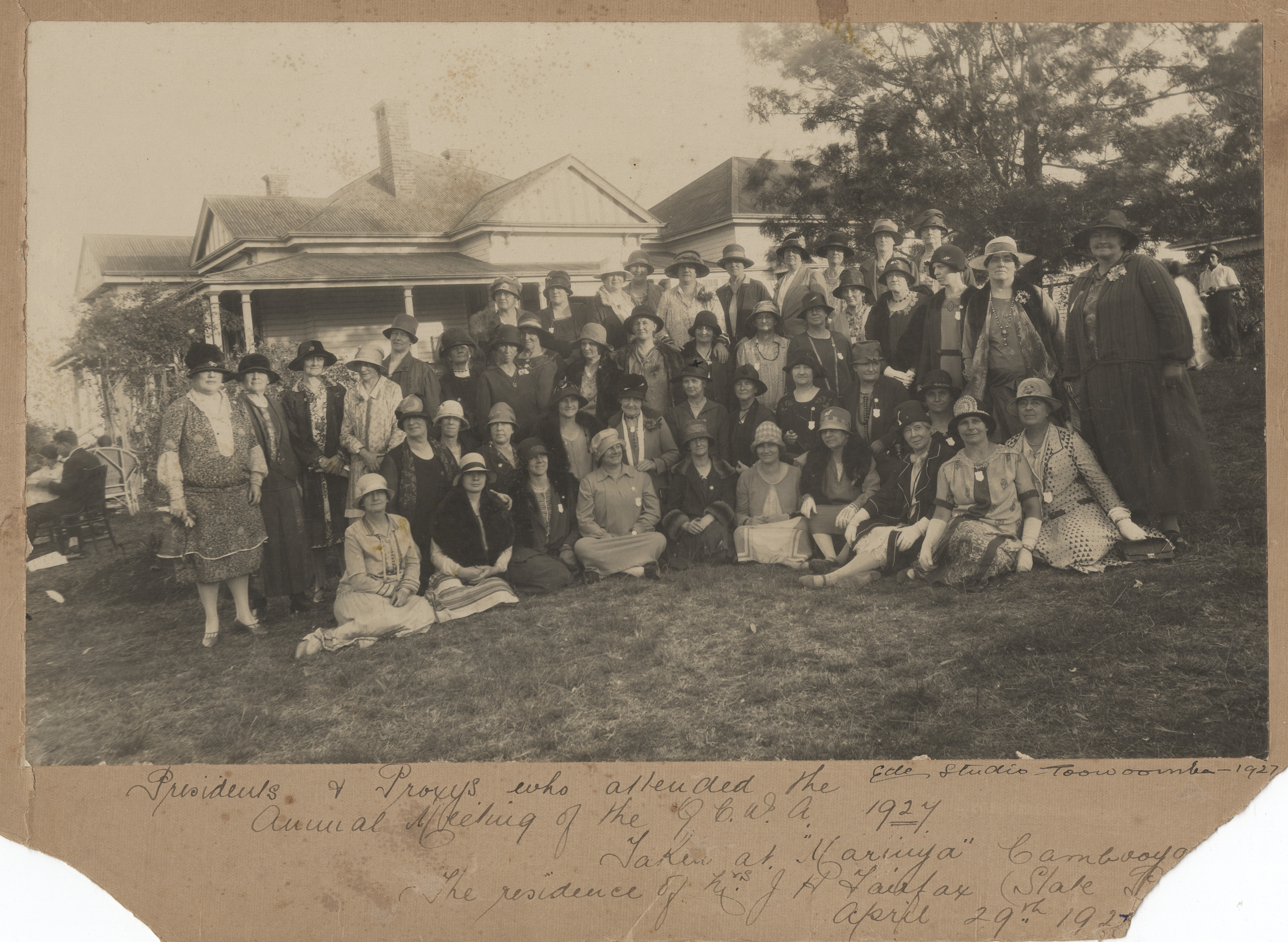
Women attending the annual meeting of the Queensland Country Women's Association at Ruth Fairfax's property Marinya at Cambooya, 29 April 1927

In February 1923 a branch of the Queensland Country Women's Association was formed in Cambooya. More than 50 women attended the meeting. Ruth Fairfax (Queensland president and founder) referred to the "good work than the association could accomplish among country women, emphasis being laid "on what could be done in Cambooya and district. The newly formed branch agreed to devote its energies to assisting the Bush Nursing Association. Ruth Fairfax was elected president, and Miss Middleton secretary and treasurer." There is no longer a branch in Cambooya, although there are a number of branches in the surrounding area, including Toowoomba and Middle Ridge.

== Demographics ==
In the 2016 census, the locality of Cambooya had a population of 1,584 people.

In the 2021 census, the locality of Cambooya had a population of 2,260 people.

== Heritage listings ==
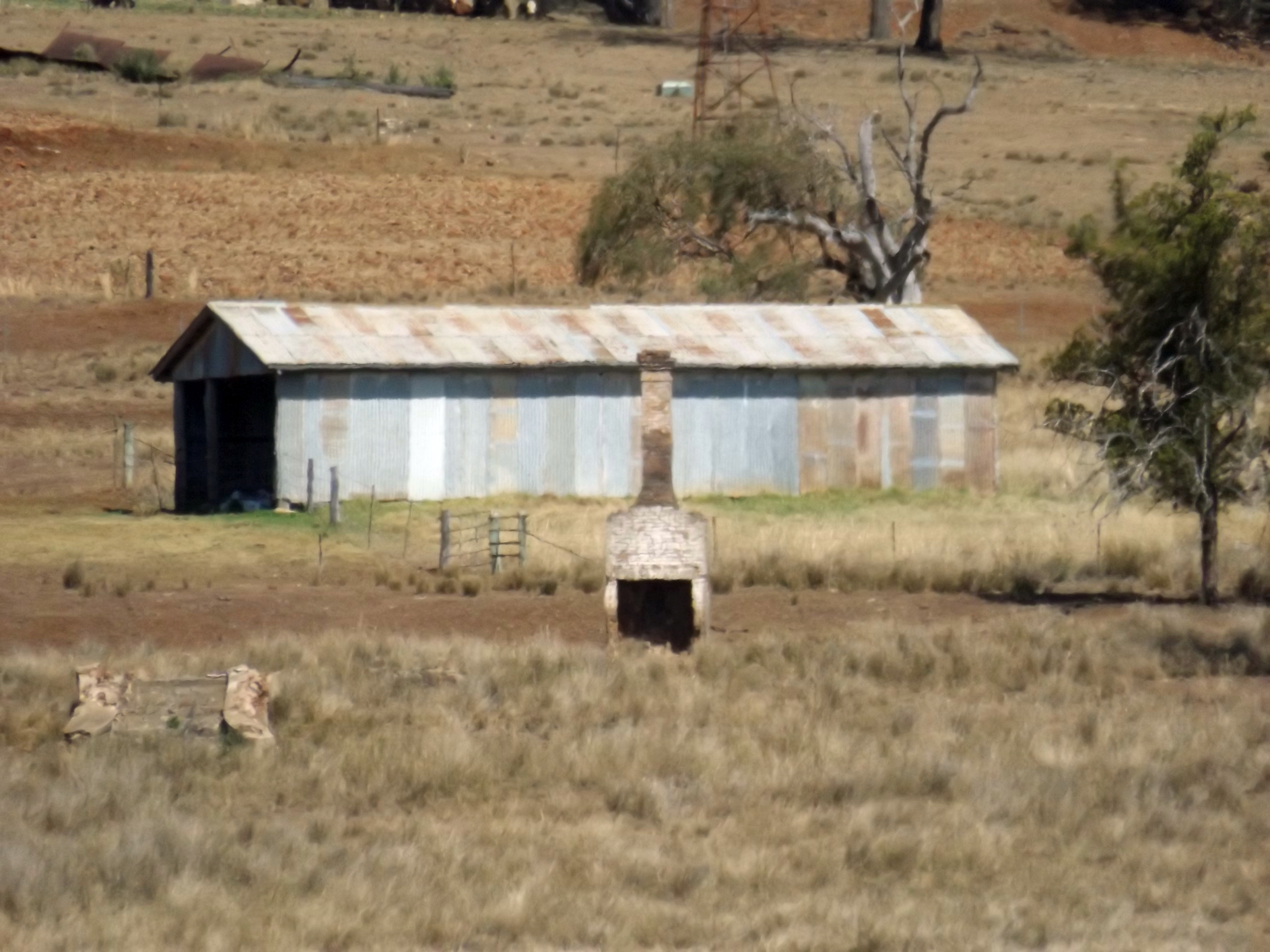
Eton Vale Homestead Ruins, 2014

Cambooya has a number of heritage-listed sites, including:

- Eton Vale Homestead Ruins, New England Highway (27.6981°S 151.9106°E)

== Economy ==
There are a number of homesteads in the locality:

- Airton Vale (27.6757°S 151.9170°E)
- Barnaline (27.7252°S 151.8214°E)
- Barnool (27.7157°S 151.8373°E)
- Braeside (27.7204°S 151.8358°E)
- Bri Bri (27.6876°S 151.9132°E)
- Clemsrese (27.6943°S 151.8421°E)
- Cottonwood Park (27.7145°S 151.8467°E)
- Harrow (27.7083°S 151.7922°E)
- Hillside (27.6890°S 151.8362°E)
- Kerrianvale (27.7460°S 151.8152°E)
- Kilmacrane (27.7105°S 151.8751°E)
- Kinroydy (27.7531°S 151.8186°E)
- Marinya (27.7362°S 151.8369°E)
- Mountside (27.6823°S 151.8153°E)
- Quean (27.6853°S 151.9041°E)
- Rocky Park (27.6943°S 151.8436°E)
- Worrah (27.7275°S 151.8224°E)

== Education ==
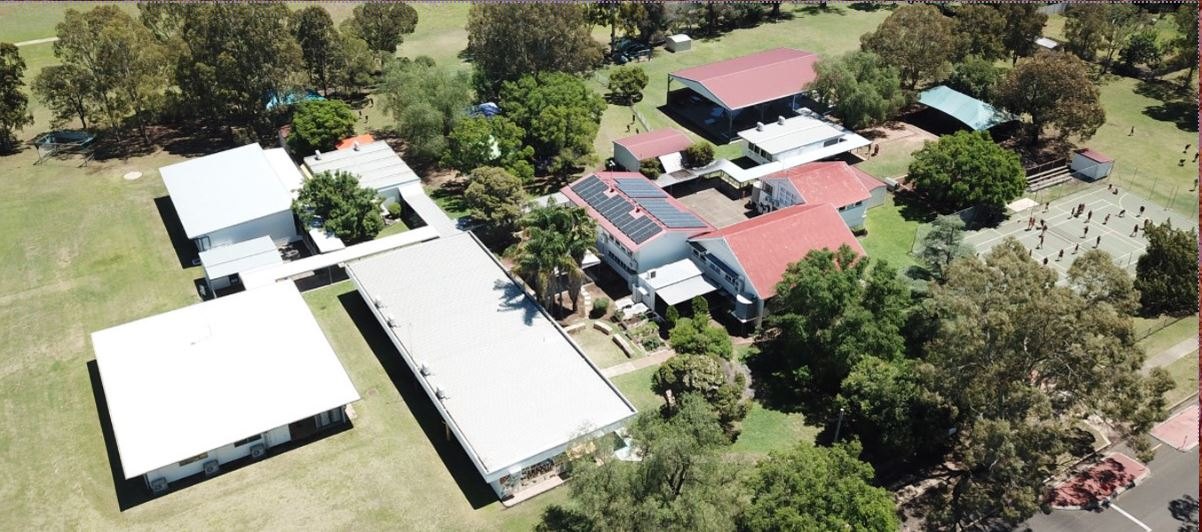
Cambooya State School, 2025

Cambooya State School is a government primary (Prep-6) school for boys and girls at 6 Harrow Street (27.7087°S 151.8668°E). In 2018, the school had an enrolment of 167 students with 10 teachers (8 full-time equivalent) and 9 non-teaching staff (6 full-time equivalent).

There are no secondary schools in Cambooya. The nearest government secondary schools are Harristown State High School in Harristown, Toowoomba, to the north-east, Centenary Heights State High School in Centenary Heights, Toowoomba, to the north-east, Clifton State High School in Clifton to the south, and Pittsworth State High School in Pittsworth to the west.

== Facilities ==
Cambooya Police Station is at 18 Quarry Street, enter via Gray Street (27.7052°S 151.8595°E).

Cambooya SES is on George Street north of the junction with Ernest Street (27.7057°S 151.8671°E).

Cambooya Post Office is located at 53 Eton Street (27.7071°S 151.8653°E).

== Amenities ==
Library services in Cambooya are provided by the Toowoomba Regional Council's mobile library service. The van visits Cambooya State School every Friday.

All Saints Anglican Church is at 12 Eton Street (27.7073°S 151.8715°E).

Sacred Heart Catholic Church is at 11 Eton Street (27.7078°S 151.8700°E) with the former wooden church beside it.

Cambooya Uniting Church is at 19 Eton Street (27.7077°S 151.8690°E).

== Attractions ==
Cambooya has an historic pub called the Bull and Barley at 61 Eton Street (27.7069°S 151.8642°E). It has been featured on the television show Getaway. Originally opened in 1902 as the Cambooya Railway Hotel, it was one of three pubs in the town, but now it is the only hotel in Cambooya. The name was changed to the Bull and Barley Inn in 1978.

Across the road from the pub is the Coominya War Memorial in the Memorial Park (27.7066°S 151.863796°E). It is a 24 feet (7.3 m) high obelisk carved from Helidon freestone featuring sculpted crossed rifles with marble plaques with names inscribed of both those who died and those who served.

== Notable people ==
- Arthur Hoey Davis, famous poet and writer known as Steele Rudd; lived in the district
- Ruth Fairfax, founder of the Queensland Country Women's Association; lived in Cambooya from her marriage until 1931
- Sir Arthur Hodgson KCMG, pioneer settler and prominent politician

== Climate ==
Climate data for Cambooya
| Month | Jan | Feb | Mar | Apr | May | Jun | Jul | Aug | Sep | Oct | Nov | Dec | Year |
|---|---|---|---|---|---|---|---|---|---|---|---|---|---|
| Record high °C (°F) | 41.0 (105.8) | 39.7 (103.5) | 35.6 (96.1) | 34.5 (94.1) | 29.4 (84.9) | 26.0 (78.8) | 26.5 (79.7) | 31.1 (88.0) | 33.5 (92.3) | 38.3 (100.9) | 39.4 (102.9) | 40.5 (104.9) | 41.0 (105.8) |
| Mean daily maximum °C (°F) | 30.1 (86.2) | 29.3 (84.7) | 27.9 (82.2) | 25.1 (77.2) | 21.4 (70.5) | 18.3 (64.9) | 17.7 (63.9) | 19.3 (66.7) | 22.6 (72.7) | 25.8 (78.4) | 28.5 (83.3) | 30.0 (86.0) | 24.7 (76.5) |
| Mean daily minimum °C (°F) | 16.3 (61.3) | 16.1 (61.0) | 14.3 (57.7) | 9.6 (49.3) | 5.7 (42.3) | 3.0 (37.4) | 2.0 (35.6) | 2.7 (36.9) | 5.9 (42.6) | 10.0 (50.0) | 13.0 (55.4) | 15.2 (59.4) | 9.5 (49.1) |
| Record low °C (°F) | 7.8 (46.0) | 4.4 (39.9) | 3.5 (38.3) | −1.0 (30.2) | −5.6 (21.9) | −7.5 (18.5) | −8.3 (17.1) | −7.8 (18.0) | −4.4 (24.1) | −4.5 (23.9) | 1.9 (35.4) | 5.0 (41.0) | −8.3 (17.1) |
| Average rainfall mm (inches) | 97.3 (3.83) | 80.5 (3.17) | 68.1 (2.68) | 42.2 (1.66) | 40.6 (1.60) | 40.9 (1.61) | 38.4 (1.51) | 31.2 (1.23) | 36.5 (1.44) | 64.3 (2.53) | 76.5 (3.01) | 100.6 (3.96) | 717.1 (28.23) |
| Average rainy days (≥ 0.2mm) | 8.5 | 7.9 | 7.6 | 5.4 | 5.6 | 5.9 | 5.7 | 5.1 | 5.2 | 7.1 | 7.9 | 8.7 | 80.6 |
Source: Bureau of Meteorology
