= Kearneys Spring, Queensland =

Kearneys Spring
- Suburb
- Interactive map of Kearneys Spring
- Coordinates: 27.6036°S 151.9408°E
- Country: Australia
- State: Queensland
- City: Toowoomba
- LGA: Toowoomba Region
- Location: 3.6 km (2.2 mi) S of Toowoomba CBD; 130 km (81 mi) W of Brisbane

Government
  - State electorates: Toowoomba South; Condamine
  - Federal division: Groom

Area
  - Total: 6.5 km^{2} (2.5 sq mi)

Population
  - Total: 9,419 (2021 census)
  - Density: 1,449/km^{2} (3,753/sq mi)
- Time zone: UTC+10:00 (AEST)
- Postcode: 4350
Suburbs around Kearneys Spring
Harristown	South Toowoomba	Centenary Heights
Darling Heights	Kearneys Spring	Middle Ridge
Top Camp	Top Camp	Preston

Kearneys Spring is a residential locality in Toowoomba in the Toowoomba Region, Queensland, Australia. In the 2021 census, Kearneys Spring had a population of 9,419 people.

== Geography ==
Kearneys Spring is located 3.6 kilometres (2 mi) south of the city centre via Ruthven Street.

Kearneys Spring is divided into western and eastern portions by the wetlands formed by West Creek.

The land use is predominantly suburban housing with a small area of farmland in the south of the locality used for grazing on native vegetation.

== History ==
The suburb was named for a family who had a dairy farm in the area. An early irrigation scheme consisting of wooden pipes transported water from the springs, providing Toowoomba's water supply.

The Christian Outreach College opened in 1982. On 21 January 2019, the school was renamed Highlands Christian College.

== Demographics ==
In the 2016 census, Kearneys Spring had a population of 8,552 people.

In the 2021 census, Kearneys Spring had a population of 9,419 people.

== Education ==
Highlands Christian College is a private primary and secondary (Prep-12) school for boys and girls at 505 Hume Street on the east of Kearneys Spring (27.6000°S 151.9492°E). In 2017, the school had an enrolment of 473 students with 44 teachers (38 full-time equivalent) and 49 non-teaching staff (29 full-time equivalent).

There are no government schools in Kearneys Spring. The nearest government primary schools are Darling Heights State School in neighbouring Darling Heights to the west, Harristown State School in neighbouring Harristown to the north-west, and Middle Ridge State School in neighbouring Middle Ridge to the west. The nearest government secondary schools are Harristown State High School in Harristown and Centenary Heights State High School in neighbouring Centenary Heights to the north-east.

== Amenities ==
Five small shopping centres are located in the suburb: Toowoomba Plaza and The Ridge Shopping Centre (containing a Woolworths and an ALDI) on the east side, and Westridge and Uni Plaza (opposite University of Southern Queensland's main campus) on the west side. There is also a shopping plaza on Ruthven Street, known as Ruthven Plaza. It contains retailers such as Harvey Norman, Rebel Sport and other similar stores.
