= Greenmount, Queensland (Toowoomba Region) =

Greenmount
- Town
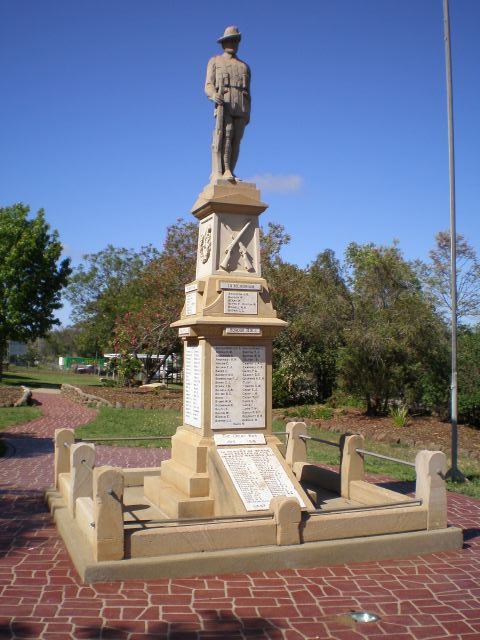
- Greenmount war memorial

- Interactive map of Greenmount
- Coordinates: 27.7858°S 151.905°E
- Country: Australia
- State: Queensland
- LGA: Toowoomba Region
- Location: 19.1 km (11.9 mi) N of Clifton; 29.5 km (18.3 mi) S of Toowoomba; 153 km (95 mi) WSW of Brisbane

Government
  - State electorate: Condamine
  - Federal division: Groom

Area
  - Total: 48.6 km^{2} (18.8 sq mi)

Population
  - Total: 765 (2021 census)
  - Density: 15.741/km^{2} (40.77/sq mi)
- Time zone: UTC+10:00 (AEST)
- Postcode: 4359
Localities around Greenmount
Cambooya	Cambooya	East Greenmount
Felton	Greenmount	East Greenmount
Nobby	Nobby	Nobby

Greenmount is a rural town and locality in the Toowoomba Region, Queensland, Australia. In the 2021 census, the locality of Greenmount had a population of 765 people.

== Geography ==
Greenmount is a rural town on the Darling Downs. It is located just off the New England Highway 32 kilometres (20 mi) south of the regional city of Toowoomba.

== History ==
Greenmount was formerly known as Greenmount West, and prior to that as Emu Creek. It takes its present name from the property owned by Donald Mackintosh, a local farmer and Member of the Queensland Legislative Assembly.

The region was settled by graziers in the 1840s; farming activities remain the chief source of employment in Greenmount today.

In 1879, the post office called Emu Creek Siding was renamed Greenmount, and the post office formerly called Greenmount was renamed Emu Creek.

Greenmount Presbyterian Church opened on Sunday 11 July 1886.

Greenmount Provisional School opened on 10 September 1901. On 1 January 1909, it became Greenmount State School.

The Greenmount War Memorial was dedicated on 11 December 1922 by Queensland Governor, Matthew Nathan.

== Demographics ==
In the 2006 census, the locality of Greenmount had a population of 336 people.

In the 2016 census, the locality of Greenmount had a population of 699 people.

In the 2021 census, the locality of Greenmount had a population of 765 people.

== Heritage listings ==
Greenmount has a number of heritage-listed sites, including:

- Greenmount War Memorial, 13 Ramsay Street (Bicentennial Memorial Park, 27.7866°S 151.9055°E)

== Education ==
Greenmount State School is a government primary (Prep–6) school for boys and girls at 9–11 Haldon Street (27.7893°S 151.9067°E). In 2018, the school had an enrolment of 46 students with 5 teachers (3 full-time equivalent) and 6 non-teaching staff (3 full-time equivalent).

There are no secondary schools in Greenmount. The nearest government secondary schools are Clifton State High School in Clifton to the south and Harristown State High School in Harristown, Toowoomba, to the north.

== Amenities ==
Library services in Greenmount are provided by the Toowoomba Regional Council's mobile library service. The van visits Pilton Street every Friday.

Greenmount features a number of parks, including:

- Bicentennial Memorial Park,13 Ramsay Street (27.7868°S 151.9053°E) features the war memorial, barbeque, basketball half-court and playground
- Violet Brody Park, east end of Ramsay Street (27.7893°S 151.9093°E)
- Jack Derrick Park, 12-14 King Street (27.7851°S 151.9011°E), has playground equipment and picnic facilities

== Notable residents ==
Author Steele Rudd (Arthur Hoey Davis), of Dad and Dave fame, lived in the region and attended Emu Creek State School, a nearby school, until the age of twelve.

Also, Queensland artist Rex Backhaus-Smith lived there with his family in the 1970s.
