= Highlands Christian College =

Highlands Christian College Toowoomba

Location
- 505 Hume Street, Kearneys Spring; Toowoomba, Queensland; Australia; 27°36′2.74″S 151°56′58.04″E

Information
- Type: Private, co-ed
- Motto: Learning. Faith. Life.
- Denomination: Christian
- Established: 1982
- Grades: P–12 (with connection to Early Learning Centre within same campus)
- Colors: Navy, black, gold
- Website: highlands.qld.edu.au

Highlands Christian College, formerly Christian Outreach College Toowoomba, is an independent, non-denominational Christian, co-educational, P-12, school, located in Kearneys Spring, Toowoomba, in Queensland, Australia. It is administered by Independent Schools Queensland, with an enrolment of 661 students and a teaching staff of 53, as of 2023. The school serves students from Prep to Year 12, but are divided into Primary and Secondary.

== History ==
The school was established on 1 January 1982 as Christian Outreach College Toowoomba at the back of Highlands Church, which was founded in 1978.

The school changed its name from Christian Outreach College Toowoomba to Highlands Christian College on 21 January 2019.

== Sporting Houses ==
The college is divided into four 'house groups' – Finney (Red) Liddell (Yellow), Booth (Green), and Wesley (Blue). These house groups compete to encourage interest and involvement in different athletic events held throughout the year.

== Extra-Curriculars ==
The college provides many extra-curricular activities such as TSSS level sporting and athletics, Science and Engineering Challenge, Eisteddfods, school camps, and excursions.
