= Drayton State School =

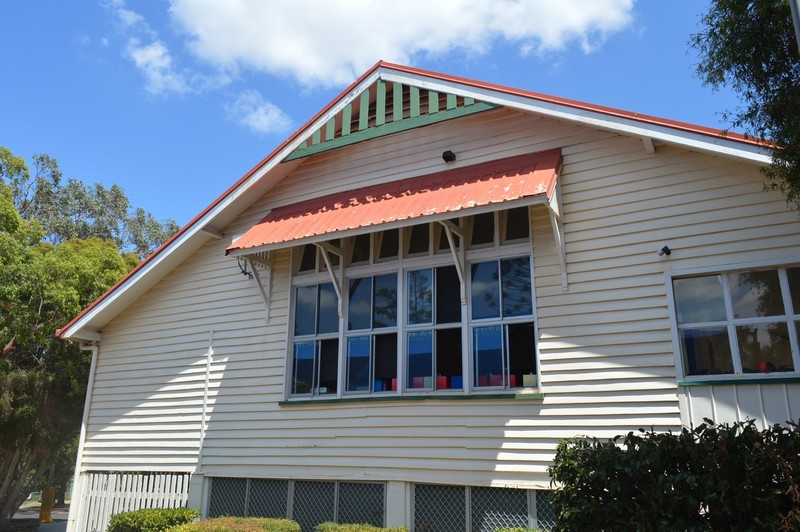
- Block A (1912) from the southwest, 2019

- Location within Queensland
- 27.6021°S 151.9116°E
- Location: 71–89 Brisbane Street, Drayton, Toowoomba Region, Queensland, Australia

History
- Design period: 1900–1914 (Early 20th century)
- Built: 1912

Site notes
- Architect: Department of Public Works (Queensland)

Queensland Heritage Register
- Official name: Drayton State School
- Type: state heritage
- Designated: 28 February 2020
- Reference no.: 650246
- Type: Education, Research, Scientific Facility: School – state (primary)
- Theme: Educating Queenslanders: Providing primary schooling

Drayton State School is a heritage-listed state school at 71–89 Brisbane Street, Drayton, Toowoomba Region, Queensland, Australia. It was designed by the Department of Public Works (Queensland) and built in 1912. It was added to the Queensland Heritage Register on 28 February 2020.

== History ==
Drayton State School (established 1851 as Drayton National School) is located in Drayton, a locality on the south-western fringe of Toowoomba, on the Darling Downs in southeast Queensland. It is important in demonstrating the evolution of state education and its associated architecture in Queensland. The school retains its Department of Public Works (DPW) timber school with two clerestory lights (Block A: 1912), set in landscaped grounds with a school bell (1852, installed c. 1880), date palms (1932) and a Cape chestnut (1956).

Drayton State School is sited within the traditional lands of the Western Wakka Wakka people. Pastoral settlement of the Darling Downs commenced in 1840, and c. 1842 Drayton (initially called "The Springs") began as a camping site near the intersection of Eton Vale, Westbrook and Gowrie pastoral stations, for those travelling from the northern Darling Downs to Brisbane. The settlement became the district's social and commercial centre. The area was known as Drayton by 1849, being the name of early settler Thomas Alford's house, store and post office, in commemoration of his birthplace in Drayton, Somerset.Town allotments were surveyed in May 1849 and land on Darling Street (allotments 9 and 10 of section 4) was set aside for a national school.

In pre-separation Queensland (then part of New South Wales), education was provided initially by fee-charging religious schools and private academies. The standard of education varied and most of these early schools were short-lived. They catered principally for children in the main population centres of Brisbane and Ipswich. A more organised approach to education commenced with Governor Fitzroy's appointment of a National Board of Education in 1848. Modelled on the Irish system, the purpose of the Board was to provide state-assisted secular, elementary education for as many children as possible, particularly in isolated areas. The Board established and administered schools where parents contributed one-third of the building costs and guaranteed an average attendance of at least 30 pupils.

Drayton townsfolk met at the Bull's Head Inn in 1848 to initiate the establishment of such a school. A school committee was elected and fund-raising for a building commenced. Application was made for a suitable site and a "mixed school", to cost £150. Drayton National School opened, on a one acre (0.41ha) site within its current grounds, on 16 August 1851, with 15 girls and 9 boys enrolled. It was the second of two National Schools opened in pre-separation Queensland. The school operated throughout the 1850s with enrolments ranging between 24 and 65 pupils; except in 1855 when it lacked a teacher and temporarily closed. In 1871, the one-acre reserve for a national school in Drayton was proclaimed.

Following separation of the Colony of Queensland from New South Wales on 10 December 1859, the Queensland Government introduced the Education Act 1860, which created a Board of General Education to oversee the development and administration of all schools in the colony. Assuming control of existing national schools, the Board aimed to establish a system of national schools similar to the New South Wales model. Despite minimal resources and a shortage of teachers, the number of public or national schools increased from four schools in 1860 to 230 by 1875.

The settlement of Toowoomba, which had been surveyed as the Drayton Agricultural Reserve in 1849, overtook Drayton as the principal urban centre of the northern Darling Downs by 1859. Nonetheless, Drayton was a centre for the sittings of the Circuit Court, and the Church of England had established a church in the town before 1859 and Drayton continued to grow. It formed a municipal council in 1862 and became the administrative centre of Drayton Shire in 1887. The town's population rose from 321 in1861 to 983 in 1891.

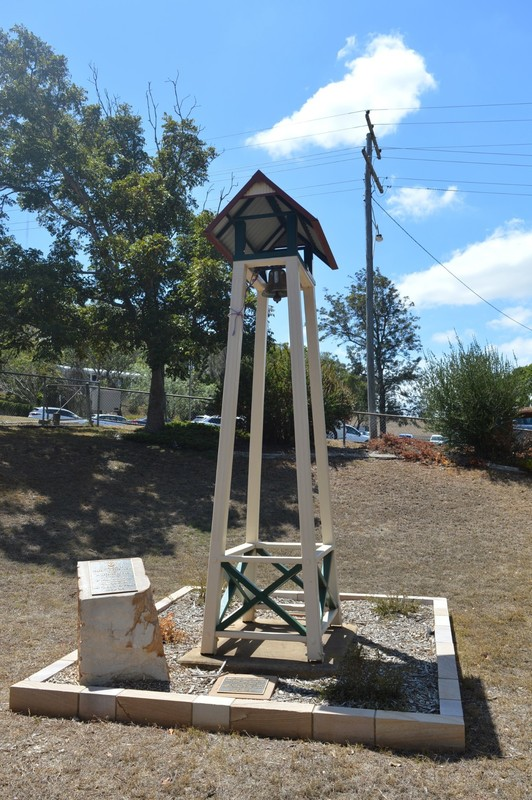
School bell (circa 1852), 2019

Consequently, Drayton State School's enrolments also increased, to about 200 pupils in 1878, requiring more accommodation and facilities, and enlargement of the school grounds for a head teacher's residence. The original school building was reused as the head teacher's residence until 1867 when it was demolished and replaced with a new residence. In 1873, the schoolhouse was extended with the addition of an infants' wing. The teachers residence was replaced three times: in 1867, 1877 and 1907. In 1877, the teacher's residence was replaced on the newly purchased Lots 21–24 of section 1, opposite the school on Darling Street. A play shed was erected within the school grounds in November 1878. A room was added on the western side of the schoolhouse in 1900. The teacher's residence was replaced in 1907. By 1880, the school bell, reportedly donated by the local St Matthew's Church of England (1859) and dating from 1852 when it was installed at the parsonage, had been hung at the school. The bell was donated to the Church of England at Drayton by Mr Watson on 27 January 1852 and was temporarily hung on the verandah of the parsonage, which from November 1851 was used for services until a church was built.

In 1908, one acre (0.41ha) of adjacent land was purchased for the school and the Department of Public Instruction (DPI) decided to construct a modern school building on this more level site. The head teacher's residence and the land on which it stood was sold in 1908.

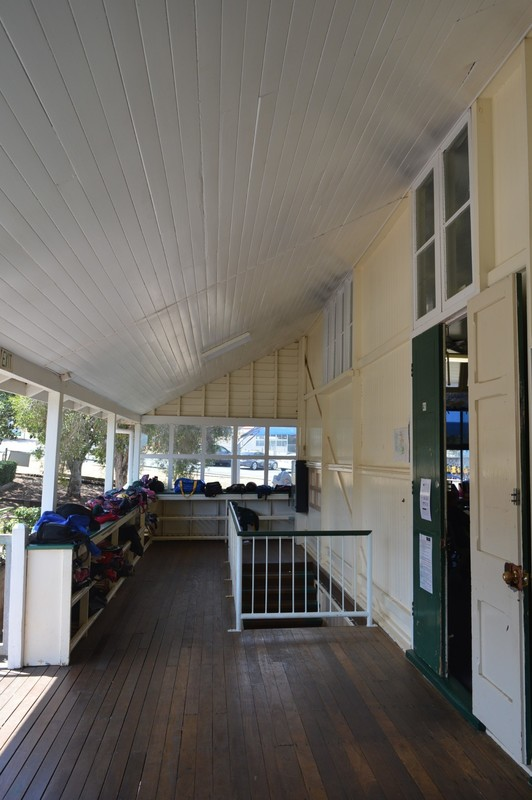
Block A (built 1912) rear verandah, from the west, 2019

The new school building (known as Block A in 2019) was constructed by contractor, A Barr, for £866 and completed in 1912. The design was a standard plan by the Department of Public Works. The building was highset on timber stumps and comprised two open verandahs (10 ft / 3.1m wide) on either side of a single classroom (24 x 50 ft / 7.32 x 15.24m). Its gable roof, sheeted with corrugated iron, had two ridge ventilators and two centrally located clerestory (skillion dormer) windows, facing opposing directions. The external gable end walls were clad in weatherboards and contained large areas of windows arranged in three rows of eight narrow sashes, shaded by timber hoods. The verandahs had hat room enclosures at the southwest end and the verandah walls were left unclad, with framing and bracing exposed. The verandah walls featured centrally located double doors with fanlights, high-level windows, and hinged ventilation boards along the base of the walls.

Access was via sets of timber stairs to the centre of each verandah, with the front (southeast) steps running parallel to the verandah and the rear (northwest) steps arranged perpendicularly, comprising a walkway and short flight of steps to the higher ground at the rear. A spoon drain ran around the rear and sides of the building and the ground beneath the building was concreted.

The classroom had high coved ceilings lined with pressed metal, and timber tie rods were exposed. Walls were lined with vertical jointed (VJ), tongue and groove (T&G) boards which were originally left unpainted. Dual desks sufficient for 120 scholars were provided, and an early photograph shows a stove standing against one wall.

Block A reflected changes in school building design introduced early in the 20th century. In c. 1909 high-set timber buildings were introduced, providing better ventilation as well as additional teaching space and a covered play area underneath. This was a notable new direction and this form became a characteristic of Queensland schools. A technical innovation developed at this time was a continuous ventilation flap on the wall at floor level. This hinged board could be opened to increase air flow into the space and, combined with a ceiling vent and large roof fleche, improved internal air quality and decreased internal temperatures effectively. This type was introduced around 1909 and was constructed until approximately 1920.

From around 1909, windows were rearranged and enlarged to provide a greater amount of gentle, southern light into the room and desks were rearranged so that the light would fall onto students' left hand sides to avoid throwing shadows onto the pages, which presupposed that all students were right-handed. Windows were larger and sills were lowered to let in more light generally. Smaller classrooms were preferred as they were easier to light correctly. Interiors became lighter and airier and met with immediate approval from educationalists. At Drayton State School, Block A's clerestory windows were a recently introduced feature, designed to improve light and ventilation in the centre of the building, and were characteristic of the building type chosen for the school. The building was also constructed with a remodelled window scheme approved after the building's design had been finalised. This was a new arrangement of casement, swing and hopper windows, with transom, to improve lighting.

On 6 July 1912, the Minister for Agriculture (Hon. James Tolmie) officially opened the building at Drayton State School on behalf of the Minister for Public Instruction (Hon. K. M. Grant).

After World War I (WWI) there was a decline in Drayton's population despite the May 1915 opening of the deviation of the Southern railway line to pass through Drayton, but community involvement in the school remained strong, with improvements to the school grounds being a focus. An additional 2 roods (0.2ha) of land was added to the Drayton school grounds in 1922 (allotment 5 of section 4). During the Great Depression, relief workers levelled the tennis court site, and funds were raised for a windmill and bore to supply reticulated water for the school gardens.

An important component of Queensland state schools was their grounds. The early and continuing commitment to play-based education, particularly in primary school, resulted in the provision of outdoor play space and sporting facilities, such as playing fields and tennis courts. Arbor Day celebrations began in Queensland in 1890, and trees and gardens were planted to shade and beautify schools. Aesthetically-designed gardens were encouraged by regional inspectors, and educators believed gardening and Arbor Days instilled in young minds the value of hard work and activity, improved classroom discipline, developed aesthetic tastes, and inspired people to stay on the land.

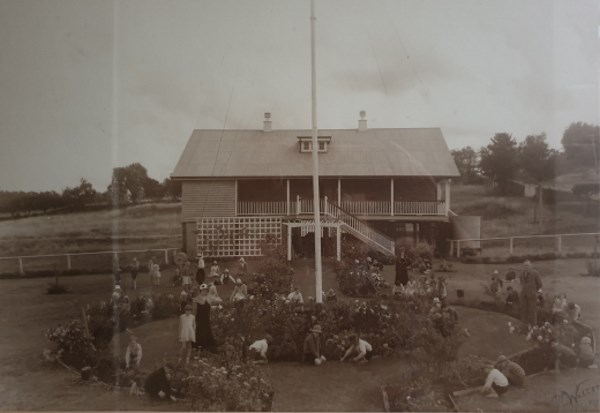
Flag pole and circular rose gardens, circa 1932

Arbor Day was celebrated at Drayton State School from 1890. During the interwar period, Arbor Day plantings augmented a new garden scheme. The school's grounds were re-organised through fortnightly working bees in 1931, which repaired the front fence, realigned the front gate to Brisbane Street, laid a new gravel path and created an elaborate garden of flower beds and lawn occupying the land in front of Block A. Massed rose beds surrounded a central flag pole while two massive rose pergolas stood at each end of the path leading from the front gate to the school steps. Arbor Day planting in 1932 added a row of palms (Phoenix sp.) bordering the front fence.

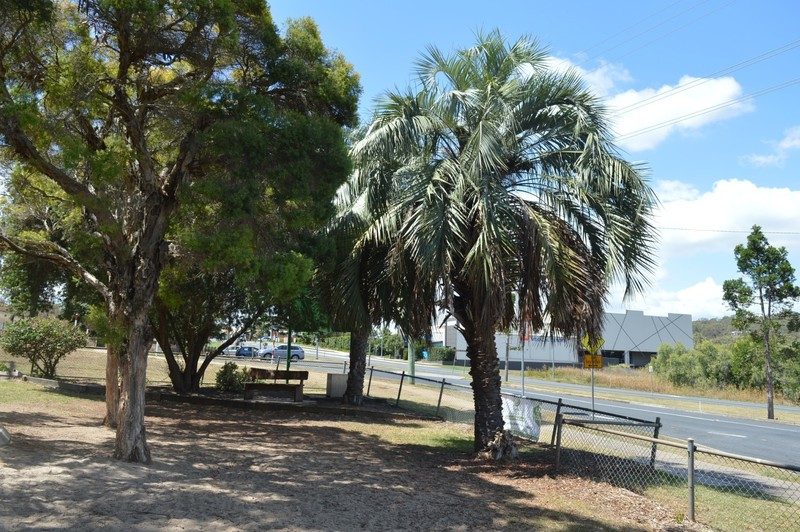
Date palms (planted 1932) at the corner of Brisbane and Darling Streets, from the west, 2019

In the late 1930s, the school acquired further land for its grounds. In 1936, the School Committee leased allotments 1–4 of section 4 from the Drayton Shire Council and used this land in conjunction with allotment 5 of section 4, as a football ground. In 1938–9, Lots 1–4 and 6 of section 4 (one acre / 0.4ha each) were added to the school grounds.

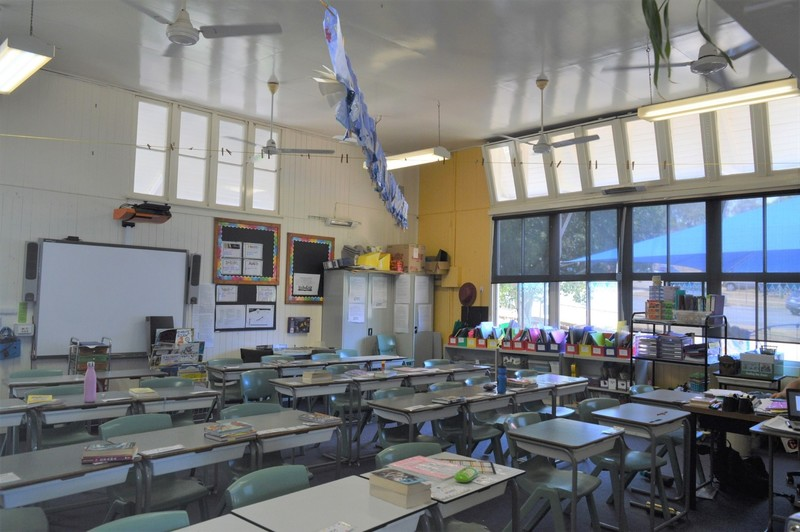
Block A (built 1912) interior from the southwest, 2019

In July 1935, Block A's single classroom was partitioned to create two smaller classrooms, (27.5 ft x 24 ft / 8.38 x 7.32m and 22.3 ft x 24 ft / 6.8 x 7.32m), with desks rearranged so that daylight entered on the left hand side of students. A doorway was inserted in the northwest verandah wall to provide access to the smaller (southwest) classroom. A glazed door in the centre of the partition allowed the head teacher to monitor both rooms.

With the threat of invasion of Australia from the commencement of the Pacific theatre of war during World War II, the Queensland Government closed all coastal state schools in January 1942, and, although most schools reopened on 2 March 1942, student attendance remained optional until the war ended. Typically, schools were a focus for civilian duty during this war. At many schools, students and staff members grew produce and flowers for donation to local hospitals and organised fundraising and the donation of useful items to Australian soldiers on active service. At Drayton State School, the garden maintained by the Poultry Raising and Vegetable Growing Project Club established c. 1934, was enlarged to become the "War Effort Vegetable Garden".

The post-WWII era brought change to Drayton and its state school. In May 1949, Drayton was incorporated into the Greater Toowoomba Area and the Drayton Shire Council ceased to exist. In 1947, Drayton's population was 443 – about the same as in 1921.

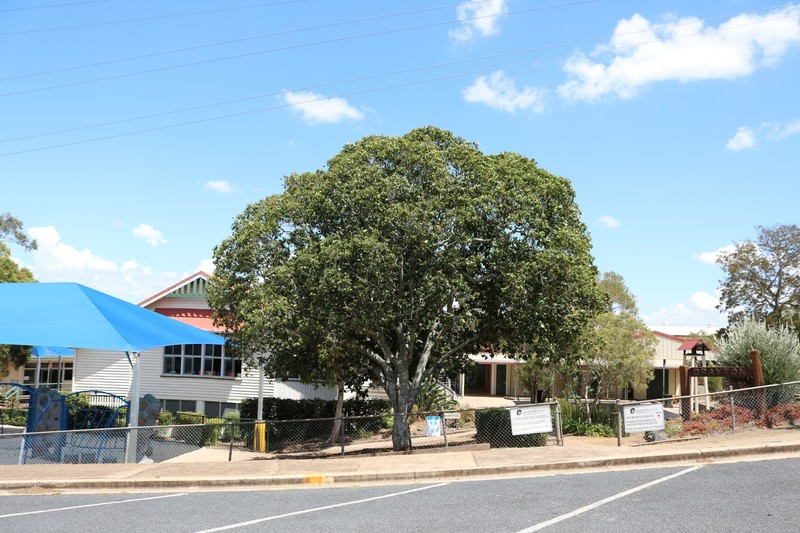
Cape chestnut tree (planted 1956) from the northeast, 2019

Enhancements to the school grounds also took place. A pine lot was planted on 30 May 1951 on the Rudd Street side of the school grounds, but was later removed to form a playing field on the site. A Cape chestnut tree (Calodendrum capense) planted near the Darling Street entrance by teacher Grace Earle in 1956 as part of Arbor Day celebrations, is still thriving in 2019. A site plan of school from 1956 shows the school building, a basket ball court, a water tank, a wind mill, and trees in front of the school. In 1963, three acres (1.2ha) were added to the school grounds on the eastern side of Darling Street. The school grounds comprised 2.93ha, spanning both sides of Darling Street. The parade area and pathways from the roadway to the school entrance were bitumenised in August 1958.

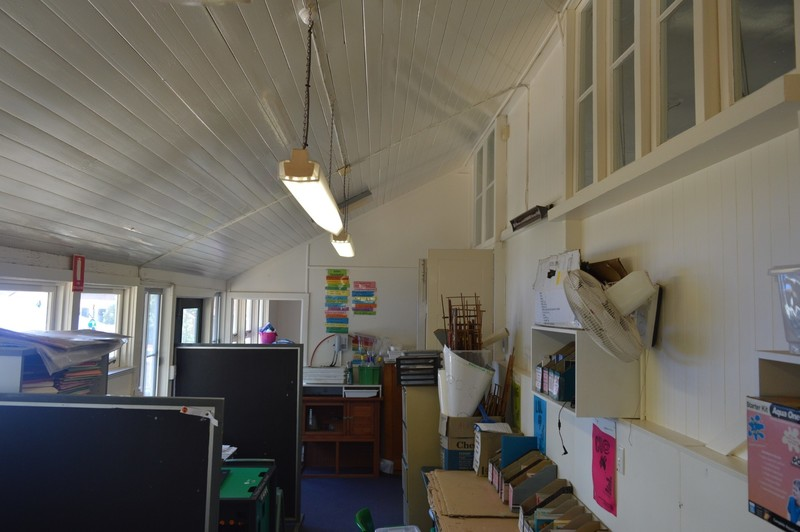
Block A (built 1912) enclosed front verandah from the east, showing single-skin wall, high windows and beaded board ceiling, 2019

Further changes to Block A were made in the post-WWII period. Between 1950 and 1960, the roof fleches were removed. New hat and bag racks approved in October 1958 were added. Before 1960, a doorway to the southwest classroom was inserted in the southeast verandah wall. In 1961, the southeast (front) verandah was enclosed, with weatherboards to sill height and awning windows above, to form a library, staffroom, and storeroom; and a glazed screen was also added to the northeast end of the northwest (rear) verandah. Between 1960 and 1975 the timber stumps were replaced with masonry piers, and louvred walls were added to the understorey. Classroom ceilings were lowered and lined with flat sheeting (potentially leaving the original pressed metal ceiling above), the understorey was reconcreted, and concrete pathways added. The clerestory windows were removed after 1975, possibly when the roof was re-sheeted, which was a common alteration. In 1984, the hat room on the northwest verandah was enclosed to form a store room, and a set of stairs to the understorey was inserted through the northwest verandah floor, leading to a new covered way to Block B. An access ramp was connected to the northwest verandah in c. 1997.

In the late 1960s and 1970s, the school's enrolments rose, requiring additional teachers and classroom accommodation, namely, Blocks B (c. 1969, extended c. 1976, c. 1978) and C (1992), and pre-school buildings. Town water, sewerage and a new perimeter fence were also added in the 1960s. More recently, other buildings have been added to the site.

During the 1970s, extensive changes were made to the school grounds. In 1977, the front of the school was graded and all existing shrubbery removed, except the palm trees on the Brisbane Street boundary. Native trees and shrubs were planted in their place to create an "environmental garden". The tennis court was levelled and sealed in 1978. In 1987, extensive levelling of the netball courts occurred, retaining walls were constructed, and landscaping performed. The grounds were also increased by 0.84ha through addition of Lots 23–26 of Section 4, along Rudd Street in March 1978.

Beginning with fundraising for its establishment, the school has been the focus and site of community interest and events throughout its history. It provided the venue for fetes and celebrations such as school anniversaries and Drayton's welcome home to its soldiers returning from WWI. The community has supported the school through donations, organising and attending events, working bees, and School Committee and Parent & Citizens Committee membership.

Milestones in the school's history, including its 90th, 100th, and 125th anniversaries, which were celebrated with commemorative events, souvenirs and published school histories. In 1950, several hundred former pupils attended the celebration of the school's 90th anniversary as a Queensland state school; a memorial plaque marking the entrance of the original school building was unveiled by Drayton School Committee president, W Peak; and later that year, a Memorial to Steele Rudd was erected in the school grounds. Centenary celebrations were held at the school in March 1960, attracting over 1000 people. In 1975 the school commemorated its 125th anniversary celebrations with a ball, and an anniversary publication. In 2001, an updated history of the school was published.

Block A is one of only two known buildings of its type that remain in the ownership of the Department of Education in 2019. The other building, at Bald Hills State School, has been heavily modified.

In 2019, Drayton State School continues to operate from its original, but expanded, site and has an enrolment of 282 pupils. It retains its 1912 timber school building and its 19th century school bell and is set in landscaped grounds with mature trees and play areas. The school remains important to Drayton and its district, as a key social focus of the community.

== Description ==
Drayton State School is a small school in the locality of Drayton, on the south-western fringe of Toowoomba. It occupies a large, gently sloping site, fronting Brisbane Street, the former main thoroughfare of the area. A complex of buildings stands on the eastern half of the site and a large playing field occupies the west.

=== Block A, 1912 ===
Block A (1912) stands at the eastern edge of the building complex and is surrounded by open space. It is a single-storey, highset, timber-framed and -clad teaching building with a gable roof. It faces southeast to the main road across a treed front garden. Offset from the rear of the building are retaining walls cut into the slope of the hill. The building has verandahs along the southeast (now enclosed) and northwest sides and accommodates two classrooms. It has large windows on its gable end walls (southwest and northeast), providing high levels of natural light and ventilation to the interior. Access to the first floor is via a single set of stairs to the southeast verandah, and by a walkway and second set of stairs to the northwest verandah.

=== Grounds and views ===
In 2019 Block A remains in its original location, fronted by open garden and play space that was historically occupied by formal gardens.

== Heritage listing ==
Drayton State School was listed on the Queensland Heritage Register on 28 February 2020 having satisfied the following criteria.

The place is important in demonstrating the evolution or pattern of Queensland's history.

Drayton State School (established as Drayton National School in 1851) is important in demonstrating the evolution of state education and its associated architecture in Queensland. The place retains a good representative example of a standard government designed school building that was an architectural response to prevailing government educational philosophies, set in landscaped grounds with provision of play areas and mature trees.

The Department of Public Works (DPW) timber school with two clerestory lights (Block A: 1912), demonstrates the evolution of timber school buildings designed by the Department of Public Works to provide abundant lighting and ventilation.

The landscaped school grounds, with provision of play areas and mature trees, demonstrate educational philosophies that promoted the importance of play and aesthetics in the education of children.

The place is important in demonstrating the principal characteristics of a particular class of cultural places.

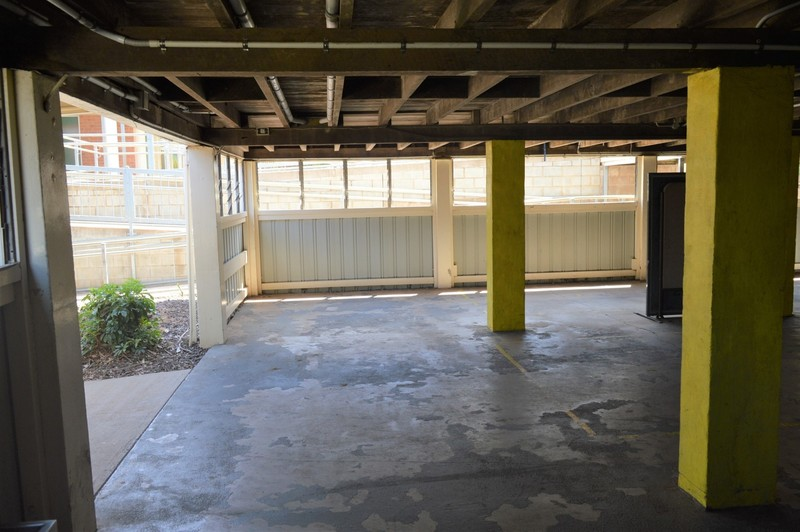
Block A (built 1912) understorey, 2019

Drayton State School is important in demonstrating the principal characteristics of a Queensland state school. These include buildings constructed to standard government designs that incorporate understorey play areas, verandahs, and classrooms with high levels of natural light and ventilation; and a generous, landscaped site with mature trees and play areas. It is a good example of a small country school.

Block A (1912) is a rare and intact example of a Department of Public Works (DPW) timber school with two clerestory lights, with later alterations by the DPW. It is important in demonstrating the principal characteristics of this type, which include: its highset, gable-roofed form; timber-framed and -clad construction with single-skin verandah walls; open understorey play space; verandahs on two sides, with hat rooms; large windows with hoods to gable end walls; high-level windows to verandah walls; hinged timber ventilation boards at floor level; doors; interior linings; and c. 1935 classroom partition.

The place has a strong or special association with a particular community or cultural group for social, cultural or spiritual reasons.

Drayton State School has a strong and ongoing association with past and present pupils, parents, staff members, and the surrounding community through sustained use since its establishment in 1851 in the small rural township. The place is important for its contribution to the educational development of the Drayton community for more than 160 years, with generations of children taught at the school. Since its inception, Drayton State School has served as a venue for social interaction and community focus. The strength of the association is demonstrated through repeated local volunteer actions, donations, and more recently, an active Parents and Citizens Association.
