= Eton Vale Homestead Ruins =

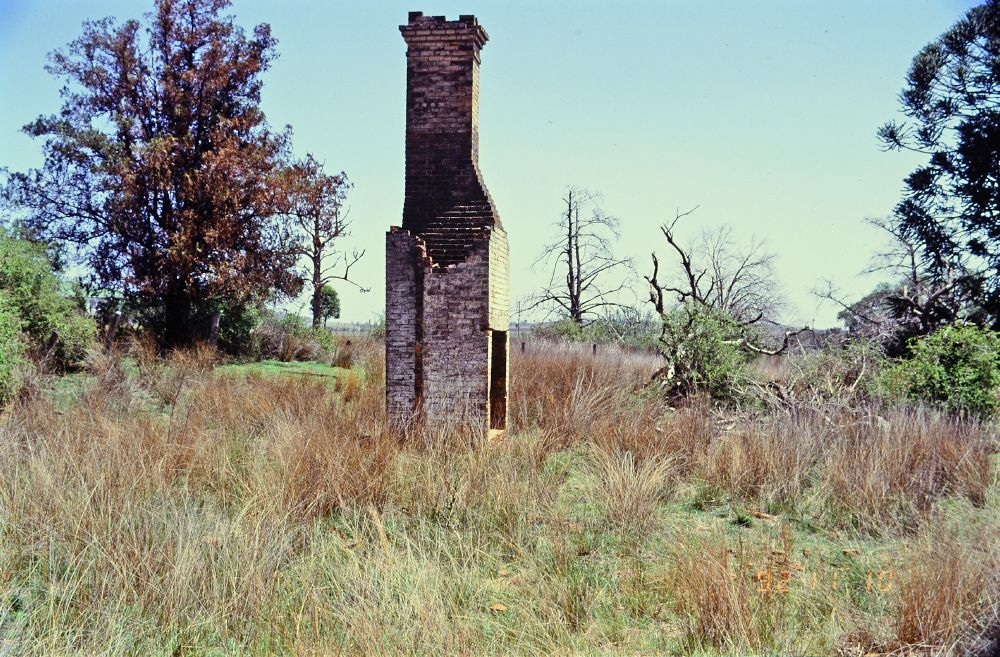
- Chimney remains, 1992

- Location within Queensland Location within Australia
- 27.6981°S 151.9106°E
- Location: New England Highway, Cambooya, Toowoomba Region, Queensland, Australia

History
- Design period: 1840s–1860s (mid-19th century)
- Built: c. 1840–1880

Queensland Heritage Register
- Official name: Eton Vale Homestead Ruins
- Type: state heritage (archaeological)
- Designated: 21 October 1992
- Reference no.: 600391
- Significant period: 1840s (historical); 1840s–1880s (fabric)
- Significant components: steps/stairway, well, wall/s, views from, chimney/chimney stack, views to, ruin/s

The Eton Vale Homestead Ruins are a heritage-listed site on the New England Highway, Cambooya, Toowoomba Region, Queensland, Australia. The former homestead was built from c. 1840 onwards by Arthur Hodgson, and was destroyed by fire in 1912. The site was added to the Queensland Heritage Register on 21 October 1992.

== History ==
Eton Vale Station was squatted in 1840 by brothers Arthur Hodgson and Christopher Pemberton Hodgson who had followed the Leslie Brothers onto the Darling Downs. It was the second run selected in Queensland. At the time it covered an area of 268 square kilometres (103 sq mi). Originally a grazing property, wheat was grown from 1846 and it became a sheep stud in 1850. The slab house, erected soon after 1840 formed the core of a larger brick residence which continued to be added to up to as late as 1880. In the late 1840s, the squatters of the Darling Downs were able to purchase pastoral leases. Darling Downs became known as the 'jewel in the diadem of squatterdom' with an elite class living in comfortable houses.

At its peak the station complex was a village complete with workers' cottages and a school in addition to a number of outbuildings. Hodgson modelled Eton Vale on the English village style, taking a paternalistic interest in the affairs of the estate workers. Hodgson's manager and eventual partner was John Watts, who took on the station from the 1850s onwards. Watts' share was later bought by Robert Ramsay. All three men were prominent in local affairs as well as being members of parliament and cabinet ministers. They all retired to estates in England, Watts in 1867, Hodgson in 1870 and Ramsay in 1883.

The various land acts from 1863 onward slowly reduced the size of the property. In 1877, 6,500 acres (2,600 ha) of land was resumed from the Eton Vale property to establish smaller farms. The land was offered for selection on 17 April 1877. However, Hodgson still held 130 square kilometres (50 sq mi) under numerous tenures and titles in 1897. In that year Eton Vale was partitioned between Ramsay and Hodgson, Ramsay's half was renamed Harrow.

Following the death of Hodgson in 1902, the estate was broken up. In 1906 the homestead and surrounding freehold property were sold to Christian Barth, a German saddler. The homestead was destroyed by fire in 1912. In 1932 Eton Vale was sold to Frederick Robotham whose family still own the property. Robotham built the present farmhouse nearby. The ruins of the earlier homestead have deteriorated over the years.

== Description ==
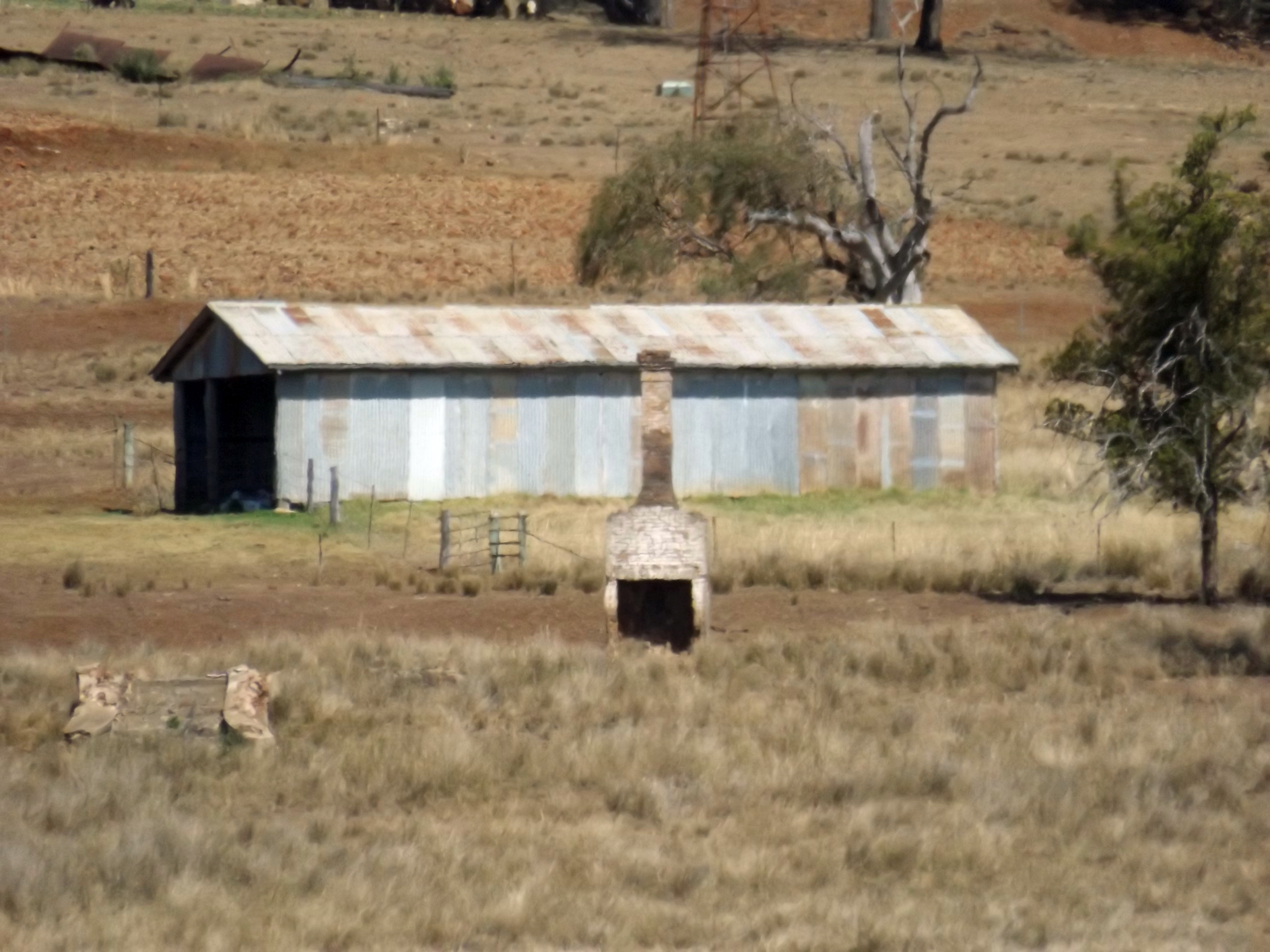
Ruins of staircase and chimney in front of a more recent shed, 2014

Sited on a slope that falls gently towards Hodgson Creek, the Eton Vale homestead would have once overlooked the fields to its west, assuming prominence when viewed from this aspect. A single brick chimney now dominates the ruins, which also include two sets of stairs made of cement-rendered brick on stone and mortar foundations, several hearth beds consisting of stone and mortar foundations, timber stump remains, and scattered fragments of building materials. A well is located to the north-west of the house site.

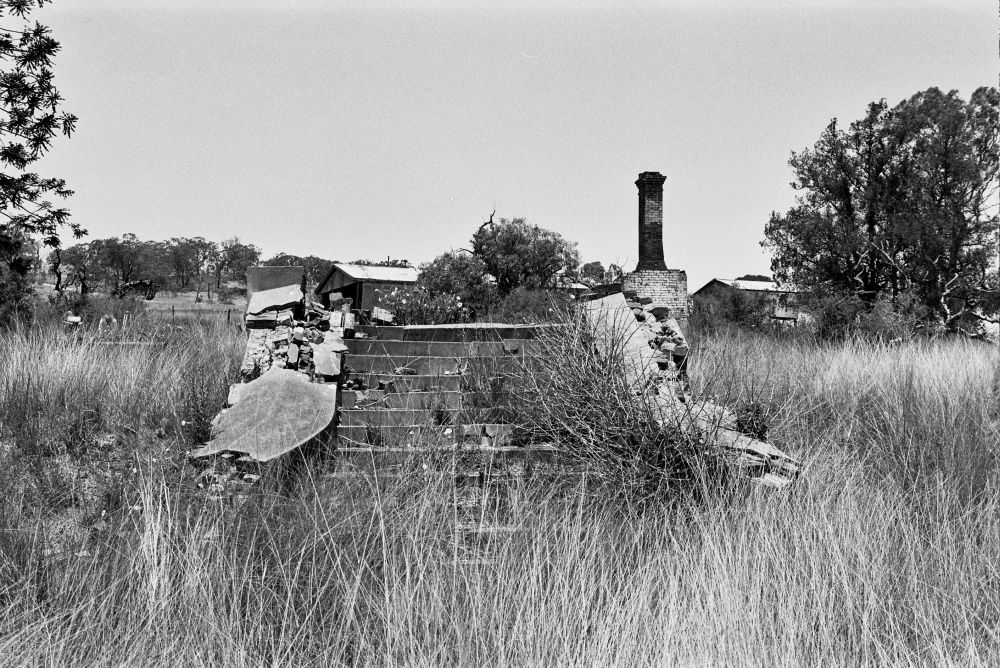
Staircase ruins

The location of the ruins' elements indicate the orientation of the house, with the principal entry stairs and a retaining wall located to the west, secondary stairs to the north, and a large chimney stack (probably associated with the kitchen) at the rear of the site to the east. Five timber stump remnants mark the northern edge of the house. The hearth beds are located between the stairs, stumps and chimney.

The site is littered with bricks, stamped Toowoomba, as well as steel fixings and fragments of glass and terracotta. Two bunya pines, one each immediately to the north and the south of the house site may have been part of the homestead garden. The well is marked with remnants of a steel pulley on a timber frame.

== Heritage listing ==
Eton Vale Homestead Ruins was listed on the Queensland Heritage Register on 21 October 1992 having satisfied the following criteria.

The place is important in demonstrating the evolution or pattern of Queensland's history.

Eton Vale Homestead Ruins on the eastern Darling Downs is important in demonstrating the evolution of Queensland's history, being the surviving remnants of a number of station buildings which were once located on the second oldest and leading property in the area.

The place has potential to yield information that will contribute to an understanding of Queensland's history.

The place has potential to yield information that will contribute to an understanding of Queensland's history, as the ruins give a clear indication where the house was sited and where key elements of the house were located.

The place is important because of its aesthetic significance.

The landscape and garden remnants exhibit aesthetic characteristics valued by the community.

The place has a special association with the life or work of a particular person, group or organisation of importance in Queensland's history.

The ruins have a special association with prominent parliamentarian and early settler, Arthur Hodgson.
