= Toowoomba Region =

- Local government area

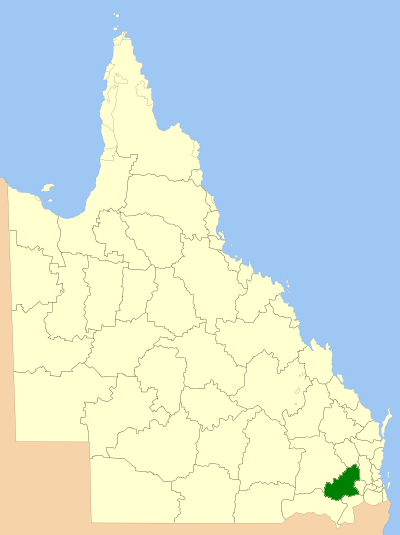
- Location within Queensland
- Interactive map of Toowoomba Region
- Coordinates: 27°34′30.60″S 151°56′48.75″E
- Country: Australia
- State: Queensland
- Region: Darling Downs, South East Queensland
- Established: 2008
- Council seat: Toowoomba

Government
  - Mayor: Geoff McDonald
  - State electorates: Toowoomba North; Toowoomba South; Condamine; Nanango; Southern Downs
  - Federal divisions: Groom; Maranoa

Area
  - Total: 12,957 km^{2} (5,003 sq mi)

Population
  - Total: 186,276 (2025)
  - Density: 14.3765/km^{2} (37.2349/sq mi)
- Website: Toowoomba Region
LGAs around Toowoomba Region
Western Downs	South Burnett	Somerset
Western Downs	Toowoomba Region	Lockyer Valley
Goondiwindi	Southern Downs	Lockyer Valley

Aerial views of the Toowoomba Region

The Toowoomba Region is a local government area (LGA) on the border of Darling Downs and South East Queensland regions of Queensland, Australia. Established in 2008, the LGA was preceded by several other local government authorities with histories extending back to the early 1900s and beyond.

In 2018–2019, it had a A$491 million budget, of which A$316 million is for service delivery and A$175.13 million capital (infrastructure) budget.

In the 2021 census, the Toowoomba Region had a population of 173,204 people. With an estimated population as of 2025 of 186,276 people.

== History ==
Prior to the 2008 amalgamation, the Toowoomba Region existed as eight distinct local government areas: the City of Toowoomba and the Shires of Cambooya, Clifton, Crows Nest, Jondaryan, Millmerran, Pittsworth, and Rosalie.

The City had its beginning in the Toowoomba Municipality which was proclaimed on 24 November 1860 under the Municipalities Act 1858, a piece of New South Wales legislation inherited by Queensland when it became a separate colony in 1859. William Henry Groom, sometimes described as the "father of Toowoomba", was elected its first mayor. It achieved a measure of autonomy in 1878 with the enactment of the Local Government Act. With the passage of the Local Authorities Act 1902, Toowoomba became a town council on 31 March 1903. On 29 October 1904, Toowoomba was proclaimed a City.

The Toowoomba Region also encompassed four of Queensland's 74 divisions created under the Divisional Boards Act 1879 on 11 November 1879: Clifton, Highfields, Jondaryan and Rosalie. On 31 March 1903, these became Shires. Between 1913 and 1917, a number of changes occurred: the Millmerran and Pittsworth areas voted to split from Jondaryan on 24 April 1913, whilst in the same year Crows Nest became a shire, and in 1914, Cambooya followed. On 19 March 1949, Highfields and Drayton were abolished, with their land going to Crows Nest and Toowoomba respectively.

=== 2008 amalgamation ===
In July 2007, the Local Government Reform Commission released its report and recommended that the eight areas amalgamate. Its main reason for recommending such a large area was that the region was a growth area and a new organisation would have political advocacy capabilities on behalf of the region. Two other key factors were that Toowoomba's suburbs had expanded well beyond the City of Toowoomba and a new entity would be able to manage the entire area under one plan. Additionally, environmental and natural resource challenges could, in the Commission's view, be better met by an organisation with "a scale and capacity to undertake... management across the region in an integrated manner." Four of the councils, Jondaryan, Millmerran, Pittsworth and Rosalie were rated as financially weak by the Queensland Treasury. While no council had supported the Commission's model, most were willing to consider some form of amalgamation, and the Commission considered whether Millmerran should be united with Dalby or Toowoomba carefully. In the end, its proposal was unchanged. On 15 March 2008, the City and Shires formally ceased to exist, and elections were held on the same day to elect councillors and a mayor to the Regional Council.

== Council ==
Toowoomba Regional Council is unsubdivided and its elected body consists of 10 councillors and a mayor. Neither the Labor Party nor the Liberal National Party officially endorse candidates for council.

=== Current composition ===
The current council, elected in 2024, is:

Position	Councillor	Party
Mayor	Geoff McDonald	Independent
Councillor	Bill Cahill	Independent
Councillor	Edwina Farquhar	Independent
Councillor	Gary Gardner	Independent
Councillor	Trevor Manteufel	Independent Labor
Councillor	Tim McMahon	Independent LNP
Councillor	James O'Shea	Independent
Councillor	Kerry Shine	Independent Labor
Councillor	Carol Taylor	Independent
Councillor	Melissa Taylor	Independent
Councillor	Rebecca Vonhoff	Independent LNP

== Mayors ==
- Peter Taylor (2008–12). Elected 2008, defeated 2012.
- Paul Antonio (2012–23). Elected 2012, 2016, 2020. Retired 2023.
- Geoff McDonald (2023-current). Elected by council 2023, Elected 2024.

== Election results ==
=== 2024 ===
2024 Queensland local elections: Toowoomba Regional Council
Party	Candidate	Votes	%	±%
Independent LNP	Rebecca Vonhoff (elected)	77,397	7.96	+1.87
Independent	James O'Shea (elected)	60,790	6.25	+0.86
Independent	Melissa Taylor (elected)	60,401	6.21	+1.56
Independent Labor	Kerry Shine (elected)	58,902	6.06	+0.78
Independent	Gary Gardner (elected)	57,155	5.88	+5.88
Independent LNP	Tim McMahon (elected)	56,265	5.79	+2.02
Independent	Carol Taylor (elected)	52,561	5.40	−0.14
Independent	Bill Cahill (elected)	50,050	5.15	−0.17
Independent	Edwina Farquhar (elected)	48,765	5.01	+5.01
Independent Labor	Trevor Manteufel (elected)	39,979	4.11	+4.11
Independent	Andrew Reeson	31,890	3.28	+3.28
Independent	Mark Orford	31,492	3.24	+3.24
Independent	Paul Wilson	30,086	3.09	+3.09
Independent	Scot McPhie	29,207	3.00	+3.00
Greens	Ellisa Parker	28,645	2.95	+2.95
Independent	Eakraj Adhikari	28,163	2.90	+1.62
Say NO to WOKE	Nathan Essex	27,976	2.88	+2.88
Independent	Chris Brameld	27,121	2.79	+2.79
Independent	Michelle McIntyre	24,626	2.53	+2.53
Independent	Robert Relvas	23,951	2.46	+1.34
Independent	David King	23,138	2.38	+0.96
Say NO to WOKE	Adam Carney	22,442	2.31	+2.31
Independent	Gavin Mingay	18,992	1.95	+1.95
Independent Federation	Martin Hartwig	18,801	1.93	+1.93
Westgarths	Leeanne Westgarth	18,438	1.90	+1.90
Westgarths	George Westgarth	13,912	1.43	+1.43
Westgarths	Angus Westgarth	11,315	1.16	+1.16
Total formal votes		972,460	100.00	
Total formal ballots		97,246	89.52	+0.47
Informal ballots		11,384	10.48	−0.47
Turnout		108,630	85.86	+3.79

== Towns and localities ==
The Toowoomba Region includes the following settlements:

=== Toowoomba suburbs ===
- Blue Mountain Heights^{1}
- Centenary Heights
- Cotswold Hills^{2}
- Cranley
- Darling Heights
- Drayton
- East Toowoomba
- Glenvale^{2}
- Harlaxton
- Harristown
- Highfields^{1}
- Kearneys Spring
- Middle Ridge
- Mount Kynoch
- Mount Lofty
- Newtown
- North Toowoomba
- Prince Henry Heights
- Rangeville
- Redwood
- Rockville
- South Toowoomba
- Toowoomba City
- Torrington^{2}
- Wilsonton
- Wilsonton Heights

=== Close Regional Localities ===
- Birnam^{1}
- Charlton^{2}
- Finnie^{3}
- Gowrie Junction^{2}
- Hodgson Vale^{3}
- Mount Rascal^{3}
- Preston^{4}
- Spring Bluff^{1}
- Top Camp^{3}
- Vale View^{3}
- Wellcamp^{2}

^{1} - split with the former Shire of Crows Nest ^{2} - split with the former Shire of Jondaryan ^{3} - split with the former Shire of Cambooya> ^{4} - split with Lockyer Valley Region>

=== Regional localities ===
Cambooya area:

- Cambooya
- East Greenmount
- Greenmount
- Westbrook

Clifton area:

- Back Plains
- Clifton
- Ellangowan
- Kings Creek
- Nobby
- Pilton
- Ryeford
- Spring Creek

Crows Nest area:

- Crows Nest
- Cabarlah
- Cawdor
- Djuan
- Emu Creek
- Geham
- Glenaven
- Haden
- Hampton
- Meringandan
- Pechey
- Pierces Creek
- Ravensbourne

Jondaryan area:

- Oakey
- Athol
- Aubigny
- Evanslea
- Gowrie Mountain
- Grassdale
- Jondaryan

Millmerran area:

- Millmerran
- Bringalily
- Cecil Plains
- Domville
- Lavelle
- Lemontree
- Millmerran Downs
- Pampas
- Tummaville
- Turallin
- Yandilla

Pittsworth area:

- Pittsworth
- Biddeston
- Bongeen
- Branchview
- Brookstead
- Broxburn
- Felton
- Irongate
- Kincora
- Linthorpe
- Mount Tyson
- Nangwee
- North Branch
- Norwin
- Rossvale
- Scrubby Mountain
- Southbrook
- Springside
- St Helens
- Stoneleigh
- Yarranlea

Rosalie area:

- Goombungee
- Acland
- Evergreen
- Glencoe
- Gowrie Junction
- Meringandan West
- Upper Yarraman
- Yarraman

Mixed-area localities:

- Bowenville
- Gowrie Mountain
- Kingsthorpe
- Nobby
- Wyreema

== Economy ==
Economic growth potential in the region has been identified through retail, construction and the development of energy resources found in the Surat Basin and in food processing. As well as the development of the newly built Wellcamp Airport and Second Range Crossing, and proposed Inland Rail the city is set to become one of the largest logistical centres in the country as well as a major inland port.

== Demographics ==
The total population recorded at each census before the foundation of the Toowoomba Region combines the population of its component entities prior to their amalgamation in 2008. Its population was officially recorded for the first time in the 2011 Census.

Year	Total Region	Toowoomba	Cambooya	Clifton	Crows Nest	Jondaryan	Millmerran	Pittsworth	Rosalie	Notes
1933	56,687	26,423	2,047	3,105	2,850	5,231	2,335	3,544	7,095	
1947	62,548	33,290	1,780	2,760	2,361	5,346	3,012	3,599	6,716	
1954	70,430	43,149	1,848	2,542	3,733	5,416	3,473	3,731	6,538	
1961	77,131	50,134	1,732	2,572	3,474	5,785	3,423	3,821	6,190	
1966	81,757	55,799	1,617	2,549	3,244	5,752	3,512	3,713	5,571	
1971	84,295	59,524	1,558	2,378	3,111	5,704	3,435	3,795	4,790	
1976	92,144	66,436	1,676	2,260	3,445	6,576	3,309	3,714	4,728	
1981	94,605	66,698	1,894	2,188	4,125	7,832	3,047	3,605	5,216	
1986	106,596	73,390	2,477	2,354	5,308	9,457	3,115	3,880	6,615	
1991	117,500	81,043	2,860	2,301	6,644	10,308	3,014	4,035	7,295	
1996	124,849	83,633	4,079	2,308	8,644	11,056	2,830	4,264	8,035	
2001	132,868	86,642	4,856	2,327	10,005	12,323	3,935	4,445	8,335	
2006	141,986	90,466	5,652	2,549	12,595	13,965	3,078	4,688	8,993	
2011 census	151,189									
2016 census	160,779									
2021 census	173,204									

== Toowoomba Regional Library Services ==
The Toowoomba Regional Council operates the following libraries:

- Toowoomba City Library
- Toowoomba Local History Library
- Cecil Plains library
- Clifton Library
- Crows Nest Library (also known as the John French Library)
- Goombungee Library
- Highfields Library
- Millmerran Library
- Oakey Library
- Pittsworth Library
- Quinalow Library
- Yarraman Library
- and a mobile library which visits the communities of Bowenville, Cambooya, Cooyar, Gowrie Junction, Greenmount, Haden, Jondaryan, Kingsthorpe, Kulpi, Meringandan West, Mount Tyson, Westbrook, and Wyreema.

The Toowoomba Regional Libraries also provide a range of services including (but not limited to) free computer and internet access, free computer classes, and a Homebound Library Service for those who are temporarily or permanently home bound.
