= Harristown State High School =

Public school in Queensland, Australia

Location
- 341–367 South Street, Harristown; Toowoomba, Queensland, 4350; Australia; 27°34′26″S 151°55′58″E

Information
- Type: Public
- Motto: Recte Crescam (Grow Properly)
- Established: 1955; 71 years ago
- Principal: Dean Russell (acting)
- Staff: 200+
- Grades: 7–12
- Enrolment: 1,693 (2019)
- Colors: Brown and light blue
- Mascot: Hawk
- Accreditation: Council of International Schools
- Website: harristownshs.eq.edu.au

Harristown State High School is a public high school located in Harristown, Toowoomba, Queensland, Australia. It was officially opened in 1955. The school currently has approximately 1700 students and is the largest on the Darling Downs. Some of the Harristown State High School buildings are listed on the Queensland Heritage Register. The school's vision is ariticlutated by the acronym PRIDE: Participation, Relationships, Integrity, Diligence, Enthusiasm and its priorities by the acronym WELL: Wellness, Engagement, Literacy and Learning.

== History ==
The need for another high school in the Toowoomba area first became apparent when the other public high school, Toowoomba State High School was full. In 1953 land was acquired for another High School in the Harristown area, and the first building (B Block) was completed in 1954 prior to the school opening in 1955. The school complex includes seven buildings of significance, initially constructed during 1954–61, which are listed on the Queensland Heritage Register. Harristown State High School has a long history of academic and sporting excellence.

== Sport ==
Harristown is the most successful sporting school on the Darling Downs, having won Darling Downs Sporting School of the Year eight out of the last ten years. It has been Queensland Champion of 9 sports over the past seven years and is traditionally strong in the sports of football, hockey, volleyball and rugby league.

The school has numerous sporting facilities including four fully equipped gymnasiums, cricket nets, heated pool, tennis courts and two expansive outdoor ovals, one of which is an A-grade cricket pitch.

Harristown became the first Queensland school to reach the national open Rugby league grand final in 1992, going down by only one point.

== Notable alumni ==
- Russell Bussian, rugby league player
- Sam Carter, paralympic athlete
- Andrew Dunemann, rugby league player
- Ian Dunemann, rugby league player
- Tony Jensen, rugby league player
- Steve Price, rugby league player
- John Rillie, basketball coach and former player
- Ashley Taylor, rugby league player
- Michael Witt, rugby league player
