= Toowoomba–Karara Road =

Road route in the Toowoomba and Southern Downs regions of Queensland, Australia

Toowoomba–Karara Road Queensland

General information
- Type: Rural road
- Length: 82.5 km (51 mi)
- Route number(s): No shield (Drayton – Cambooya); State Route 48 (Cambooya – Karara)

Major junctions
- North end: Toowoomba Athol Road Drayton
- Cambooya Connection Road; Felton–Clifton Road; Pittsworth–Felton Road; Leyburn–Cunningham Road; Millmerran–Leyburn Road
- South end: Cunningham Highway Karara

Location(s)
- Major settlements: Cambooya, Felton, Leyburn

Toowoomba–Karara Road is a continuous 82.5 kilometres (51.3 mi) road route in the Toowoomba and Southern Downs regions of Queensland, Australia. Most of the route is signed as State Route 48. Toowoomba–Karara Road (number 331) is a state-controlled district road. As part of State Route 48 it provides an alternate route between Toowoomba and Inglewood. It is also part of the shortest route from Toowoomba to Texas.

== Route Description ==
The Toowoomba–Karara Road commences as Old Wyreema Road at an intersection with the Toowoomba Athol Road in Drayton, a suburb of Toowoomba. It runs south-west, becoming Toowoomba-Karara Road as it runs between Westbrook and Finnie. It passes through Wyreema as Wyreema One Mile Road and Balgour Street before again becoming Toowoomba-Karara Road. This runs south to Cambooya, following the Southern railway line. It passes through Cambooya as Railway Street, Quarry Street and Alfred Street before reaching an intersection with Cambooya Connection Road (State Route 48). Here it turns west on William Street as State Route 48, soon becoming Toowoomba-Karara Road again.

The road continues south-west through Felton, Felton South, and Ellangowan before reaching Leyburn. In Felton it passes exits to Felton-Clifton Road and Pittsworth-Felton Road. In Ellangowan it passes the exit to Clifton–Leyburn Road. As it enters Leyburn it passes exits to Leyburn-Cunningham Road (Tourist Drive 12) and Millmerran-Leyburn Road. It runs through Leyburn as Dove Street and turns south as Toowoomba-Karara Road. The road ends in Karara at an intersection with the Cunningham Highway.

Land uses along this road is primarily rural, including some areas of native vegetation.

== State Route 48 ==
State Route 48 starts as Cambooya Connection Road at an intersection with the New England Highway in Cambooya, 5.5 kilometres (3.4 mi) east of Cambooya village. It joins Toowoomba-Karara Road in Cambooya and follows it to Karara.

== Road condition ==
Toowoomba–Karara Road is fully sealed. It has no incline greater than about 4%.

== History ==
Westbrook pastoral run was established in 1841, and Eton Vale pastoral run was established in 1840 in what is now Cambooya. Felton and Felton South were the site of an early pastoral run. Ellangowan pastoral run was established in 1842, and Leyburn was settled in the 1840s. The first roads were cut to provide access to the pastoral runs and new settlements for wheeled vehicles.

In 1877 land was resumed from many pastoral runs to establish smaller farms. These resumptions included Westbrook (11,500 acres (4,700 ha)), Eton Vale (6,500 acres (2,600 ha)), and Felton (7,800 acres (3,200 ha)). These resumptions soon led to closer settlement and a demand for better roads to enable the commercial success of the new farms.

Cambooya was connected by rail to Toowoomba in 1871, and quickly grew as a commercial centre. A post office had opened in 1869, and the first school opened in 1882. The development of new farms led to greater use of the road to Toowoomba.

The site for the town of Leyburn was surveyed in 1852. By 1861 the town had a post office and a police station, and the first school opened in 1862. Despite not having a railway connection the town grew quickly, with a hotel built in 1863, a court house in 1866 and a church in 1871. This placed great reliance on a road connection to Toowoomba. As settlement spread south from Leyburn it was inevitable that a road connection to the Cunningham Highway was established.

== Intersecting state-controlled roads ==
This road intersects with the following state-controlled roads:

- Cambooya Connection Road
- Felton-Clifton Road
- Pittsworth–Felton Road
- Clifton–Leyburn Road
- Leyburn–Cunningham Road
- Millmerran–Leyburn Road

=== Cambooya Connection Road ===
Cambooya Connection Road
- Location: New England Highway, Cambooya to Toowoomba–Karara Road, Cambooya
- Length: 5.5 km (3.4 mi)
- Route number: 48

Cambooya Connection Road is a state-controlled district road (number 3304) rated as a local road of regional significance (LRRS). It is part of State Route 48. It runs from the New England Highway in Cambooya to Toowoomba–Karara Road in Cambooya, a distance of 5.5 kilometres (3.4 mi). This road has no major intersections.

=== Pittsworth–Felton Road ===
Pittsworth–Felton Road
- Location: Gore Highway, Pittsworth to Toowoomba–Karara Road, Felton
- Length: 22.4 km (13.9 mi)

Pittsworth-Felton Road is a state-controlled district road (number 332) rated as a local road of regional significance (LRRS). It runs from the Gore Highway in Pittsworth to Toowoomba–Karara Road in Felton, a distance of 22.4 kilometres (13.9 mi). The road has no major intersections.

=== Clifton–Leyburn Road ===
Clifton–Leyburn Road
- Location: Felton–Clifton Road, Clifton to Toowoomba–Karara Road, Ellangowan
- Length: 25.1 km (15.6 mi)

Clifton–Leyburn Road is a state-controlled district road (number 336) rated as a local road of regional significance (LRRS). It runs from Felton–Clifton Road in Clifton to Toowoomba–Karara Road in Ellangowan, a distance of 25.1 kilometres (15.6 mi). It intersects with Ryeford–Pratten Road in Ryeford.

=== Leyburn–Cunningham Road ===
Leyburn–Cunningham Road
- Location: Toowoomba–Karara Road, Leyburn to Cunningham Highway, Allan
- Length: 52.8 km (32.8 mi)
- Route number: 12

Leyburn-Cunningham Road is a state-controlled district road (number 3306) rated as a local road of regional significance (LRRS). It is part of Tourist Drive 12 and runs from Toowoomba–Karara Road in Leyburn to the Cunningham Highway in Allan, a distance of 52.8 kilometres (32.8 mi). It intersects with Ryeford–Pratten Road (see below) in Old Talgai.

=== Millmerran–Leyburn Road ===
Millmerran–Leyburn Road
- Location: Gore Highway, Yandilla to Toowoomba–Karara Road, Leyburn
- Length: 36.1 km (22.4 mi)

Millmerran–Leyburn Road is a state-controlled district road (number 335) rated as a local road of regional significance (LRRS). It runs from the Gore Highway in Yandilla to Toowoomba–Karara Road in Leyburn, a distance of 36.1 kilometres (22.4 mi). This road has no major intersections.

== Associated state-controlled road ==
The following state-controlled road intersects with Clifton–Leyburn Road and Leyburn–Cunningham Road:

=== Ryeford–Pratten Road ===
Ryeford–Pratten Road
- Location: Clifton–Leyburn Road, Ryegord to Leyburn–Cunningham Road, Old Talgai
- Length: 10.4 km (6.5 mi)

Ryeford–Pratten Road is a state-controlled district road (number 3363), rated as a local road of regional significance (LRRS). It runs from Clifton–Leyburn Road in Ryeford to Leyburn–Cunningham Road in Old Talgai, a distance of 10.4 kilometres (6.5 mi).

== Major intersections ==
All distances are from Google Maps.

LGA	Location	km	mi	Destinations	Notes
Toowoomba	Drayton	0	0.0	Toowoomba Athol Road – west – Westbrook, Athol, Gore Highway northeast – Harristown, Toowoomba	Northern end of Toowoomba–Karara Road (no shield). Road runs south west as Old Wyreema Road.
Toowoomba	Drayton	1.7	1.1	Hanrahan Road – east – Drayton	Road name changes to Toowoomba–Karara Road
Toowoomba	Wyreema	6.9	4.3	Umbiram Road – west – Umbiram, Southbrook	Road continues through Wyreema as Balfour Street, then reverts to Toowoomba–Karara Road.
Toowoomba	Cambooya	13.7	8.5	Cambooya Connection Road – east – New England Highway	Road runs through Cambooya as Railway Street, Quarry Street and Alfred Street. Road turns west as William Street (State Route 48) and then reverts to Toowoomba–Karara Road.
Toowoomba	Felton	27.2– 27.5	16.9– 17.1	Felton–Clifton Road – southeast – Clifton, New England Highway; Pittsworth–Felton Road – west – Pittsworth, Gore Highway	
Southern Downs	Leyburn	57.6– 57.9	35.8– 36.0	Leyburn–Cunningham Road (Tourist Drive 12) – east – Old Talgai, Cunningham, Cunningham Highway; Millmerran–Leyburn Road – north – Millmerran, Gore Highway	Road runs through Leyburn as Dove Street and then reverts to Toowoomba–Karara Road.
Southern Downs	Karara	82.5	51.3	Cunningham Highway – northeast – Thane, Warwick – southwest – Gore, Inglewood	Southern end of Toowoomba–Karara Road (State Route 48).
1.000 mi = 1.609 km; 1.000 km = 0.621 mi: Route transition

== See also ==
- List of road routes in Queensland
- List of numbered roads in Queensland
