= Broxburn (disambiguation) =

Broxburn is a town in West Lothian, Scotland.

Broxburn may also refer to:

- Broxburn, Alberta, Canada
- Broxburn, East Lothian, Scotland
- Broxburn, Queensland, Australia
- Broxburn Athletic F.C., in the town of Broxburn, West Lothian, Scotland
- Broxburn United F.C., in the town of Broxburn, West Lothian, Scotland

See also Broxbourne:

- Broxbourne, a town in Hertfordshire, England
