= Sandy Camp, Queensland =

Sandy Camp
- Suburb
- Interactive map of Sandy Camp
- Coordinates: 27.9819°S 151.8177°E
- Country: Australia
- State: Queensland
- LGA: Toowoomba Region
- Location: 14.5 km (9.0 mi) SW of Clifton; 58.5 km (36.4 mi) SSE of Toowoomba CBD; 174 km (108 mi) WSW of Brisbane

Government
  - State electorate: Condamine
  - Federal division: Maranoa

Area
  - Total: 66.4 km^{2} (25.6 sq mi)

Population
  - Total: 104 (2021 census)
  - Density: 1.566/km^{2} (4.057/sq mi)
- Postcode: 4361
Suburbs around Sandy Camp
| Ellangowan | Ryeford | Clifton |
| Ellangowan | Sandy Camp | Elphinstone |
| Victoria Hill | Victoria Hill | Talgai |

Sandy Camp is a rural locality in the Toowoomba Region, Queensland, Australia. In the 2021 census, Sandy Camp had a population of 104 people.

== Demographics ==
In the 2016 census, Sandy Camp had a population of 85 people.

In the 2021 census, Sandy Camp had a population of 104 people.

== Education ==
There are no schools in Sandy Camp. The nearest government primary schools are Clifton State School in neighbouring Clifton to the north-east and Back Plains State School in Back Plains to the north. The nearest government secondary school is Clifton State High School, also in Clifton.
