= Irongate, Queensland =

Irongate
- Suburb
- Interactive map of Irongate
- Coordinates: 27.6344°S 151.5233°E
- Country: Australia
- State: Queensland
- LGA: Toowoomba Region
- Location: 17.2 km (10.7 mi) NW of Pittsworth; 53.7 km (33.4 mi) W of Toowoomba; 181 km (112 mi) W of Brisbane

Government
  - State electorate: Condamine
  - Federal division: Groom

Area
  - Total: 54.6 km^{2} (21.1 sq mi)
- Elevation: 390–520 m (1,280–1,710 ft)

Population
  - Total: 135 (2021 census)
  - Density: 2.473/km^{2} (6.404/sq mi)
- Time zone: UTC+10:00 (AEST)
- Postcode: 4356
Suburbs around Irongate
Bongeen	Mount Tyson	Mount Tyson
Bongeen	Irongate	Rossvale
St Helens	St Helens	Springside

Irongate is a rural locality in the Toowoomba Region, Queensland, Australia. In the 2021 census, Irongate had a population of 135 people.

== Geography ==
Irongate Conservation Park is a 29.035 hectares (71.75 acres) protected area off Wallingford Road in the south of the locality (27.6575°S 151.5247°E).

The land use is a mixture of crop growing and grazing on native vegetation.

== History ==
Iron Gate State School (also written as Irongate State School) opened on 17 January 1910 and closed on 10 February 1963. It was at 941 Irongate Road (junction with Mondam Road, 27.6269°S 151.5167°E).

Wallingford State School opened on 7 April 1919 and closed on 27 August 1967. It was at 147 Wallingford Road (27.6820°S 151.5451°E).

== Demographics ==
In the 2016 census, Irongate had a population of 119 people.

In the 2021 census, Irongate had a population of 135 people.

== Economy ==
There are a number of homesteads in the locality, including:

- Bonnie Doon (27.6313°S 151.5528°E)
- Chandon Lodge (27.6274°S 151.5521°E)
- Cooleigh (27.6331°S 151.5258°E)
- Craigilee (27.6107°S 151.5162°E)
- Creston (27.5964°S 151.4938°E)
- Farview (27.6526°S 151.5096°E)
- Karinya (27.6646°S 151.5298°E)
- North View (27.6356°S 151.5329°E)
- Plain View (27.6283°S 151.5447°E)
- Taronga (27.6127°S 151.5116°E)
- Westernview (27.6717°S 151.5436°E)
- Willow Glen (27.6215°S 151.5359°E)
- Wondavue (27.6484°S 151.5393°E)

== Education ==
There are no schools in Irongate. The nearest government primary schools are Mount Tyson State School in neighbouring Mount Tyson to the north-east, Pittsworth State School in Pittsworth to the south-east, and Brookstead State School in Brookstead to the south-west. The nearest government secondary school is Pittsworth State High School in Pittsworth.
