= Mount Molar, Queensland =

Mount Molar
- Suburb
- Interactive map of Mount Molar
- Coordinates: 27.8986°S 151.8511°E
- Country: Australia
- State: Queensland
- LGA: Toowoomba Region
- Location: 10.2 km (6.3 mi) NW of Clifton; 47.0 km (29.2 mi) SSW of Toowoomba; 55.3 km (34.4 mi) NW of Warwick; 170 km (110 mi) WSW of Brisbane

Government
  - State electorate: Condamine
  - Federal division: Maranoa

Area
  - Total: 37.4 km^{2} (14.4 sq mi)

Population
  - Total: 117 (2021 census)
  - Density: 3.128/km^{2} (8.10/sq mi)
- Time zone: UTC+10:00 (AEST)
- Postcode: 4361
Suburbs around Mount Molar
Nobby	Nobby	Nobby
Back Plains	Mount Molar	Kings Creek
Ryeford	Ryeford	Kings Creek

Mount Molar is a rural locality in the Toowoomba Region, Queensland, Australia. In the 2021 census, Mount Molar had a population of 117 people.

== Geography ==
The Clifton - Leyburn Road forms the south-east boundary of the locality.

Mount Molar is a mountain in the south-east of the locality (27.9083°S 151.8566°E) rising to 592 metres (1,942 ft) above sea level. The locality presumably takes its name from the mountain. There are 3 other unnamed peaks of 550 metres (1,800 ft) in the west of the locality.

The land use is predominantly crop growing on the lower elevations with grazing on native vegetation occurring on the higher elevations.

== Demographics ==
In the 2016 census, Mount Molar had a population of 115 people.

In the 2021 census, Mount Molar had a population of 117 people.

== Education ==
There are no schools in Mount Molar. The nearest government primary schools are Back Plains State School in neighbouring Back Plains to the west, Nobby State School in neighbouring Nobby to the north-west, and Clifton State School in Clifton to the south-east. The nearest government secondary school is Clifton State High School in Clifton.
