= Stoneleigh, Queensland =

Stoneleigh
- Suburb
- Interactive map of Stoneleigh
- Coordinates: 27.665°S 151.6233°E
- Country: Australia
- State: Queensland
- LGA: Toowoomba Region
- Location: 6.7 km (4.2 mi) N of Pittsworth; 42.9 km (26.7 mi) SW of Toowoomba; 175 km (109 mi) WSW of Brisbane

Government
  - State electorate: Condamine
  - Federal division: Groom

Area
  - Total: 30.3 km^{2} (11.7 sq mi)

Population
  - Total: 124 (2021 census)
  - Density: 4.092/km^{2} (10.60/sq mi)
- Time zone: UTC+10:00 (AEST)
- Postcode: 4356
Suburbs around Stoneleigh
Rossvale	Linthorpe	Linthorpe
Rossvale	Stoneleigh	Linthorpe
Springside	Pittsworth	Pittsworth

Stoneleigh is a rural locality in the Toowoomba Region, Queensland, Australia. In the 2021 census, Stoneleigh had a population of 124 people.

== Geography ==
The terrain is hilly ranging from 460 to 670 metres (1,510 to 2,200 ft) with two similarly-named but distinct peaks:

- Parkers (27.6551°S 151.6176°E) 675 metres (2,215 ft) in the centre of the locality
- Parkers Hill (27.6754°S 151.6205°E) 566 metres (1,857 ft) in the south of the locality

Wyangapinni is a neighbourhood in the north-west of the locality (27.6333°S 151.6166°E). It takes its name from Mount Wyangapinni (which is in neighbouring Rossvale to the north-west).

The Gore Highway forms a small part of the south-eastern boundary of the locality.

The McEwan State Forest is in the south-east of the locality. Apart from that protected area, the land use is predominantly agricultural involving both crop growing and grazing.

== History ==
Stoneleigh Provisional School opened in 1906, becoming Stoneleigh State School on 1 January 1909. It closed in 1919.

In July 1935, local farmer Victor George Hawkes of Turallin shot and killed his wife, his two children and his father-in-law before shooting and killing himself. He had started a fire to try to make it appear to be an accident. He had purchased the rifle earlier that day claiming he needed it to shoot wild cats. It was suggested he acted when in unsound mind, noting his depression from financial losses due to the drought and that he had been severely gassed and shellshocked during World War I.

== Demographics ==
In the 2016 census, Stoneleigh had a population of 119 people.

In the 2021 census, Stoneleigh had a population of 124 people.

== Education ==
There are no schools in Stoneleigh. The nearest government primary schools are Pittsworth State School in neighbouring Pittsworth to the south, Southbrook State School in Southbrook to the east, and Mount Tyson State School in Mount Tyson to the north-west. The nearest government secondary school is Pittsworth State High School, also in Pittsworth.
