= St Helens, Queensland =

St Helens, Queensland may refer to:

- St Helens, Queensland (Fraser Coast Region), a locality in the Fraser Coast Region
- St Helens, Queensland (Toowoomba Region), a locality in the Toowoomba Region
- St Helens Beach, Queensland a locality in the Mackay Region
