= Millmerran railway line =

Railway line in Queensland, Australia

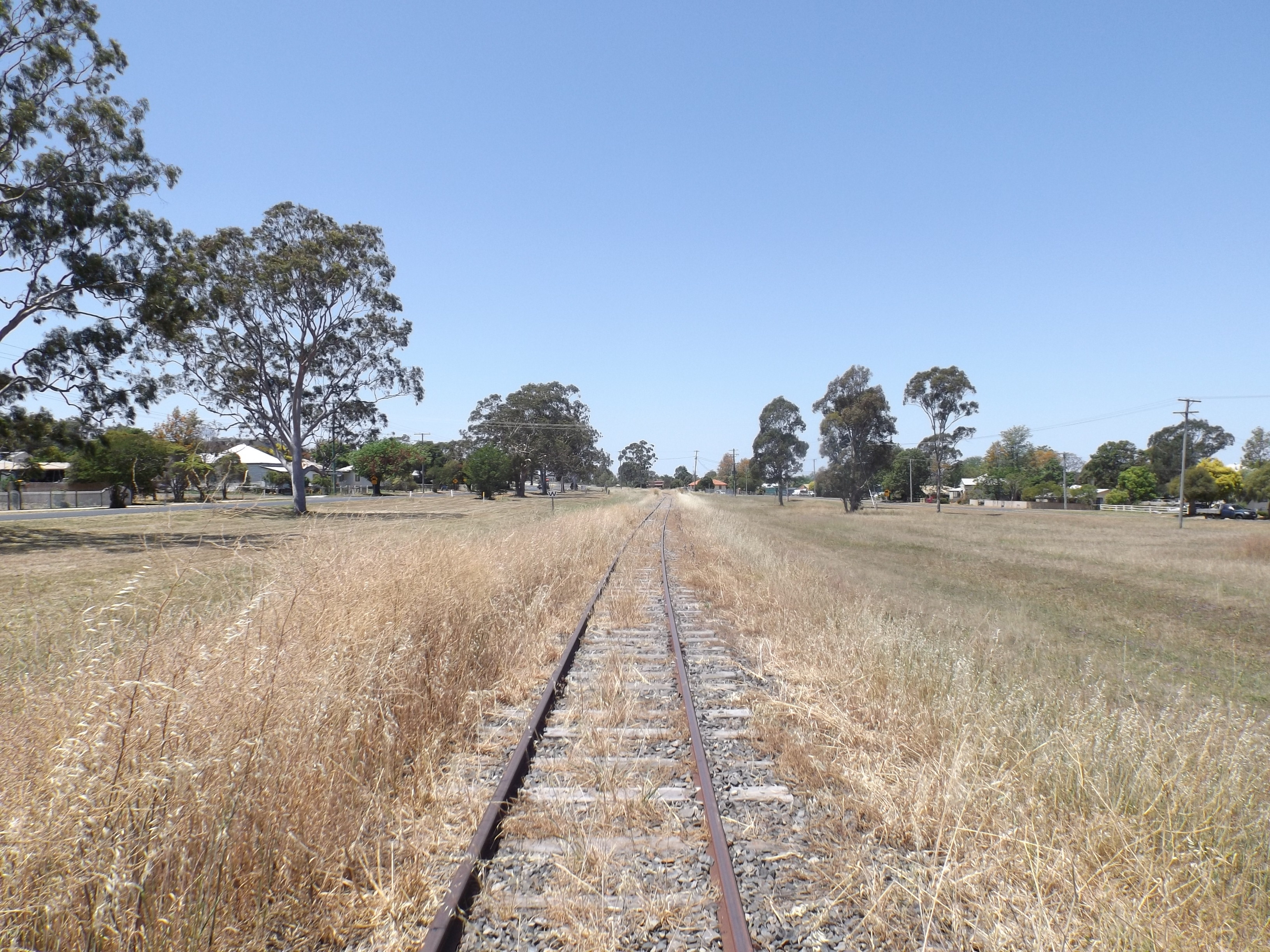
Line at Southbrook, 2014

The Millmerran railway line is a 71-kilometre (44 mi) long branch railway in the Darling Downs region of Queensland, Australia.

== History ==
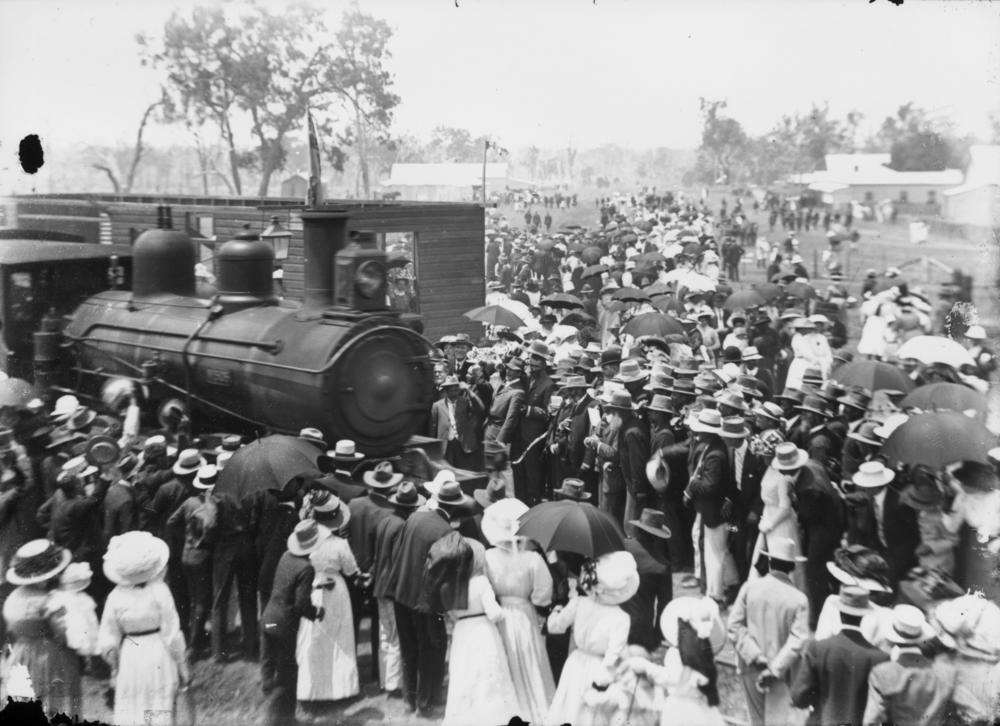
Believed to be the opening of the Millmerran section, 1911. Note the incomplete station building (no roof) behind the loco

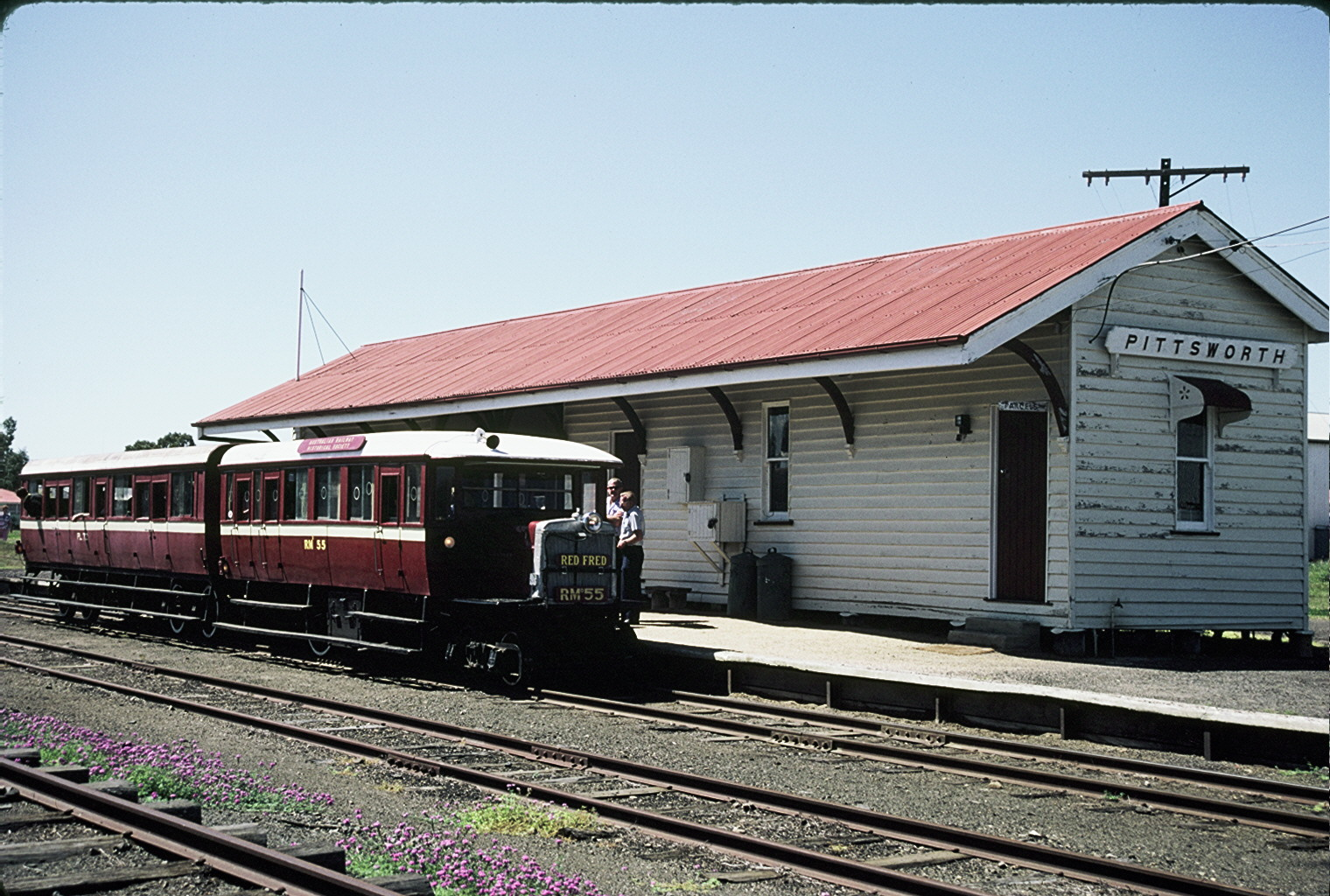
RM55 and trailer pause at Pittsworth Station on a special train to Millmerran to Celebrate the Centenary of the opening of the line to Pittsworth, September 1987

The Queensland Parliament approved a railway line to link Pittsworth with the east via the Southern railway line from Toowoomba in October 1885.

The line branches off the Southern line in the township of Wyreema (then called Beauaraba) 17 km (11 mi) south of the major regional city of Toowoomba and opened on 19 September 1887. The Southern line branched from Gowrie Junction until the opening of the Drayton Deviation from Toowoomba direct to Wyreema in 1915.

Stops were constructed en route to Pittsworth at The Hollows, Umbiram, Southbrook, Greenhills and Broxburn.

An extension to the agricultural centre of Millmerran via Murlaggan, Yarranlea, Cecilvale, Brookstead, Pampas and Yandilla was approved in November 1909 and opened for business on 18 October 1911. Much of the line closely parallels the Gore Highway.

Grain traffic was substantial and has been the branch lifeblood all along. A rail motor service operated between 1928 and 1969. As occurred elsewhere, road transport took over much of the business with the result that only spasmodic grain transport remains.

The line was closed following the 2010–11 Queensland floods. American operator Watco began operating grain trains to and from Brookstead in April 2022 on behalf of GrainCorp.

The line was laid with 30 kg/m rail with an axle load of 15.75 tonnes. The maximum grade is 1 in 50 (2%) and the minimum radius curves are 160 m (520 ft). The line speed is 50 km/h (31 mph) to Brookstead, and 30 km/h (19 mph) beyond.

== See also ==
- Rail transport in Queensland
