= Victoria Hill, Queensland =

Victoria Hill
- Suburb
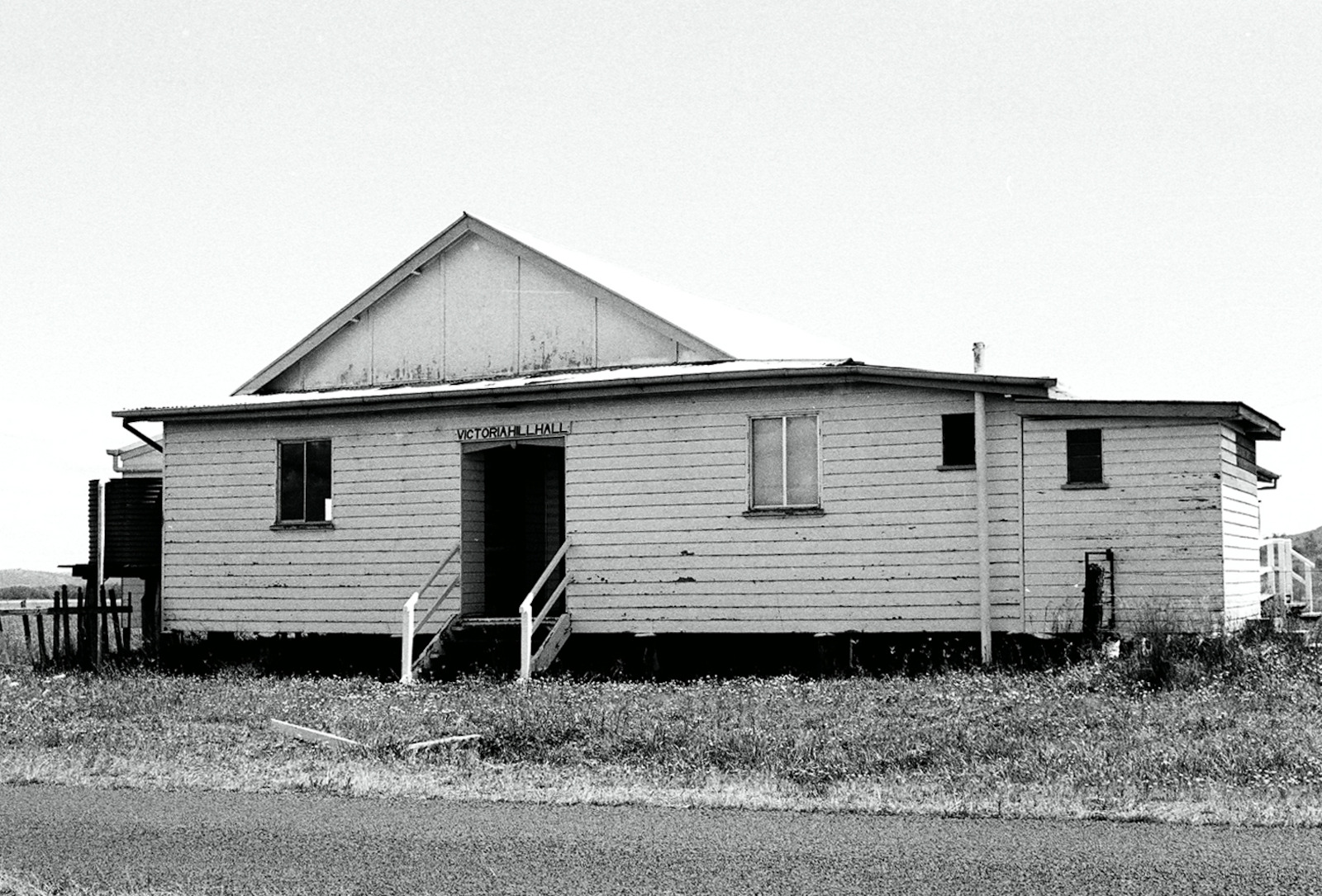
- Victoria Hill Public Hall, 1996

- Interactive map of Victoria Hill
- Coordinates: 28.025°S 151.8061°E
- Country: Australia
- State: Queensland
- Region: Darling Downs
- LGAs: Southern Downs Region; Toowoomba Region
- Location: 21.6 km (13.4 mi) W of Allora; 21.7 km (13.5 mi) SW of Clifton; 45.9 km (28.5 mi) NW of Warwick; 65.7 km (40.8 mi) SSW of Toowoomba; 180 km (110 mi) SW of Brisbane

Government
  - State electorates: Southern Downs; Condamine
  - Federal division: Maranoa

Area
  - Total: 34.9 km^{2} (13.5 sq mi)

Population
  - Total: 48 (2021 census)
  - Density: 1.375/km^{2} (3.56/sq mi)
- Time zone: UTC+10:00 (AEST)
- Postcode: 4361
Suburbs around Victoria Hill
Ellangowan	Sandy Camp	Sandy Camp
Old Talgai	Victoria Hill	Talgai
Pratten	Bony Mountain	Bony Mountain

Victoria Hill is a rural locality spit between the Southern Downs Region and the Toowoomba Region, both in Queensland, Australia. In the 2021 census, Victoria Hill had a population of 48 people.

== Geography ==
The locality is bounded to the west by the Condamine River and partially to the north by Dalrymple Creek.

The terrain varies from 410 to 470 metres (1,350 to 1,540 ft). The land use is predominantly crop growing with some grazing on native vegetation.

Dalrymple Creek Road enters the locality from the east (Talgai) and terminates in the north-east of the locality.

== History ==
Victoria Hill State School opened in July 1911. It closed on 31 December 1963. It was on a 4-acre (1.6 ha) site at 2223 Dalrymple Creek Road (28.01478°S 151.78912°E).

The Victoria Hill Hall was officially opened on Saturday 13 September 1930 by William Deacon, the Member of the Queensland Legislative Assembly for Cunningham. A sports afternoon and ball were held to celebrate the opening.

== Demographics ==
In the 2016 census, Victoria Hill had a population of 30 people.

In the 2021 census, Victoria Hill had a population of 48 people.

== Amenities ==
Victoria Hill Hall is on a 1-acre (0.40 ha) site on Dalrymple Creek Road (28.01515°S 151.79045°E). The Victoria Hill branch of the Queensland Country Women's Association meets at the hall.

== Education ==
There are no schools in Victoria Hill. The nearest government primary schools are Black Plains State School in Back Plains to the north, Clifton State School in Clifton to the north-east, Allora State School in Allora to the east, and Wheatvale State School in Wheatvale to the south-east. The nearest government secondary schools are Clifton State High School (to Year 12) in Clifton and Allora State School in Allora (to Year 10).
