= North Branch, Queensland (Toowoomba Region) =

North Branch
- Suburb
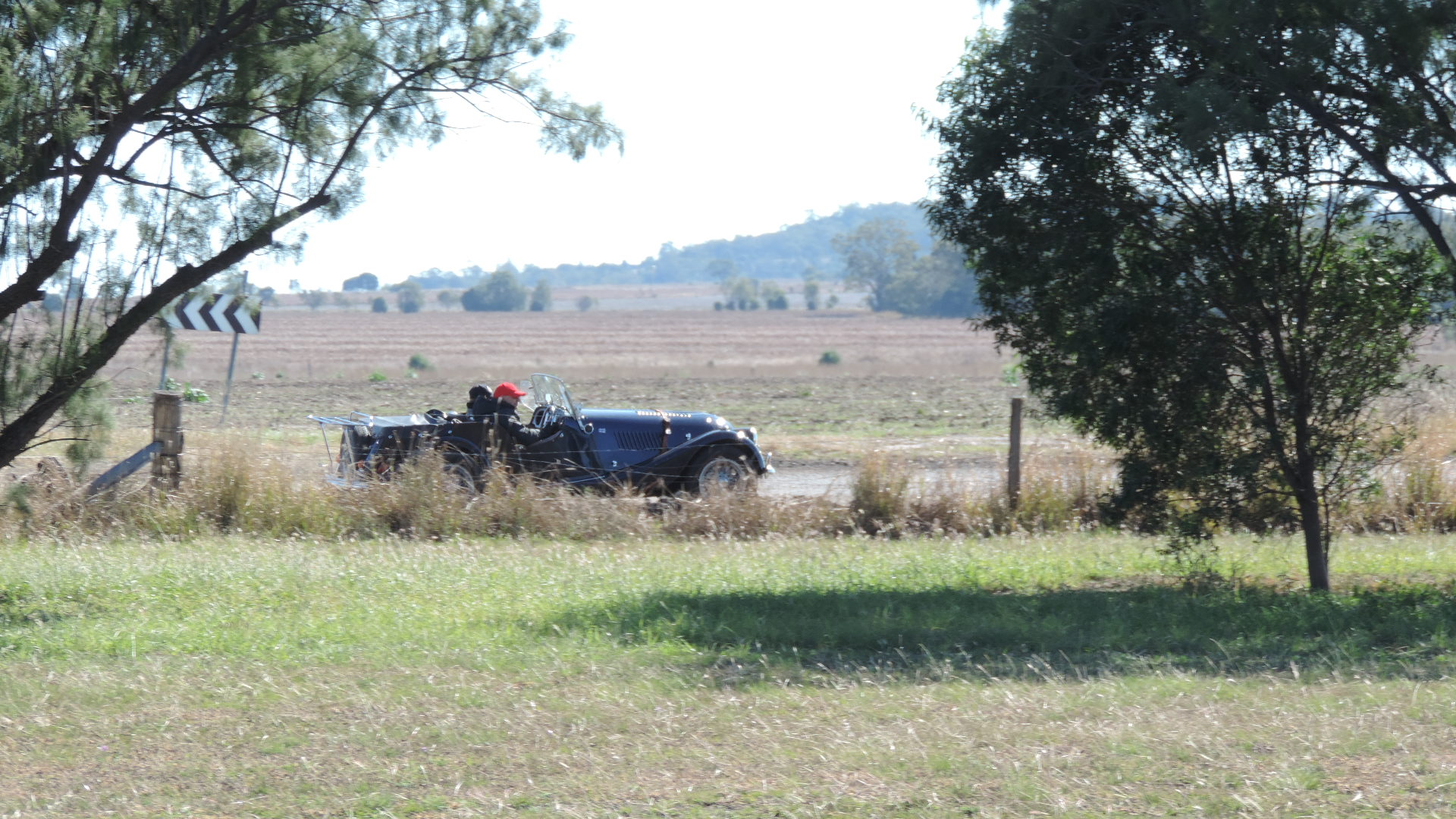
- Classic car rally passing through North Branch on Gunbower Road, 2015

- Interactive map of North Branch
- Coordinates: 27.8538°S 151.6288°E
- Country: Australia
- State: Queensland
- LGA: Toowoomba Region
- Location: 13.4 km (8.3 mi) S of Pittsworth; 53.4 km (33.2 mi) SW of Toowoomba; 78.6 km (48.8 mi) NW of Warwick; 185 km (115 mi) WSW of Brisbane

Government
  - State electorate: Condamine
  - Federal division: Groom

Area
  - Total: 99.5 km^{2} (38.4 sq mi)
- Elevation: 390–498 m (1,280–1,634 ft)

Population
  - Total: 48 (2021 census)
  - Density: 0.482/km^{2} (1.249/sq mi)
- Time zone: UTC+10:00 (AEST)
- Postcode: 4356
Suburbs around North Branch
| Scrubby Mountain | Scrubby Mountain | Pittsworth |
| Kincora | North Branch | Felton |
| Tummaville | Ellangowan | Felton South |

North Branch is a locality in the Toowoomba Region, Queensland, Australia. In the 2021 census, North Branch had a population of 48 people.

== Geography ==
The Condamine River forms part of the locality's south-east border with Felton South before crossing the locality towards the west where it splits into two branches (27.86556°S 151.59238°E). The southern branch remains known as the Condamine River and the northern branch is known as the Condamine River (north branch) and is presumably the origin of the locality name. The two branches rejoin on the boundary of Cecil Plains and Tipton (27.48629°S 151.22145°E) approximately 55 kilometres (34 mi) to the north-west.

The mountain Woolly Butt is in the north-east of the locality (27.7932°S 151.6516°E) rising to 498 metres (1,634 ft) above sea level.

The land use is predominantly crop growing with some grazing on native vegetation.

== History ==
In 1877, 17,500 acres (7,100 ha) of land was resumed from the North Branch pastoral run; it was offer for selection on 17 April 1877.

The first North Branch State School opened circa 1878 at the North Branch homestead. It was 26 by 18 feet (7.9 by 5.5 m). It closed in 1903.

The second North Branch State School opened on 11 November 1926 with an official opening ceremony on Saturday 23 April 1927. The school was on a 4-acre (1.6 ha) block of land donated by George Porter, part of a block of land selected by his father Mr J Porter 55 years earlier. The school reused buildings from the closed Spring Valley school and the Waratah school (at The Gap). The school closed on 3 November 1958. The school was at 55 Kincora Road (27.8045°S 151.6302°E).

== Demographics ==
In the 2016 census, North Branch had a population of 39 people.

In the 2021 census, North Branch had a population of 48 people.

== Education ==
There are no schools in North Branch. The nearest government primary schools are Pittsworth State School in neighbouring Pittsworth to the north-east and Back Plains State School in Back Plains to the east. The nearest government secondary schools are Pittsworth State High School, also in Pittsworth, and Clifton State High School in Clifton to the southeast.

== Facilities ==
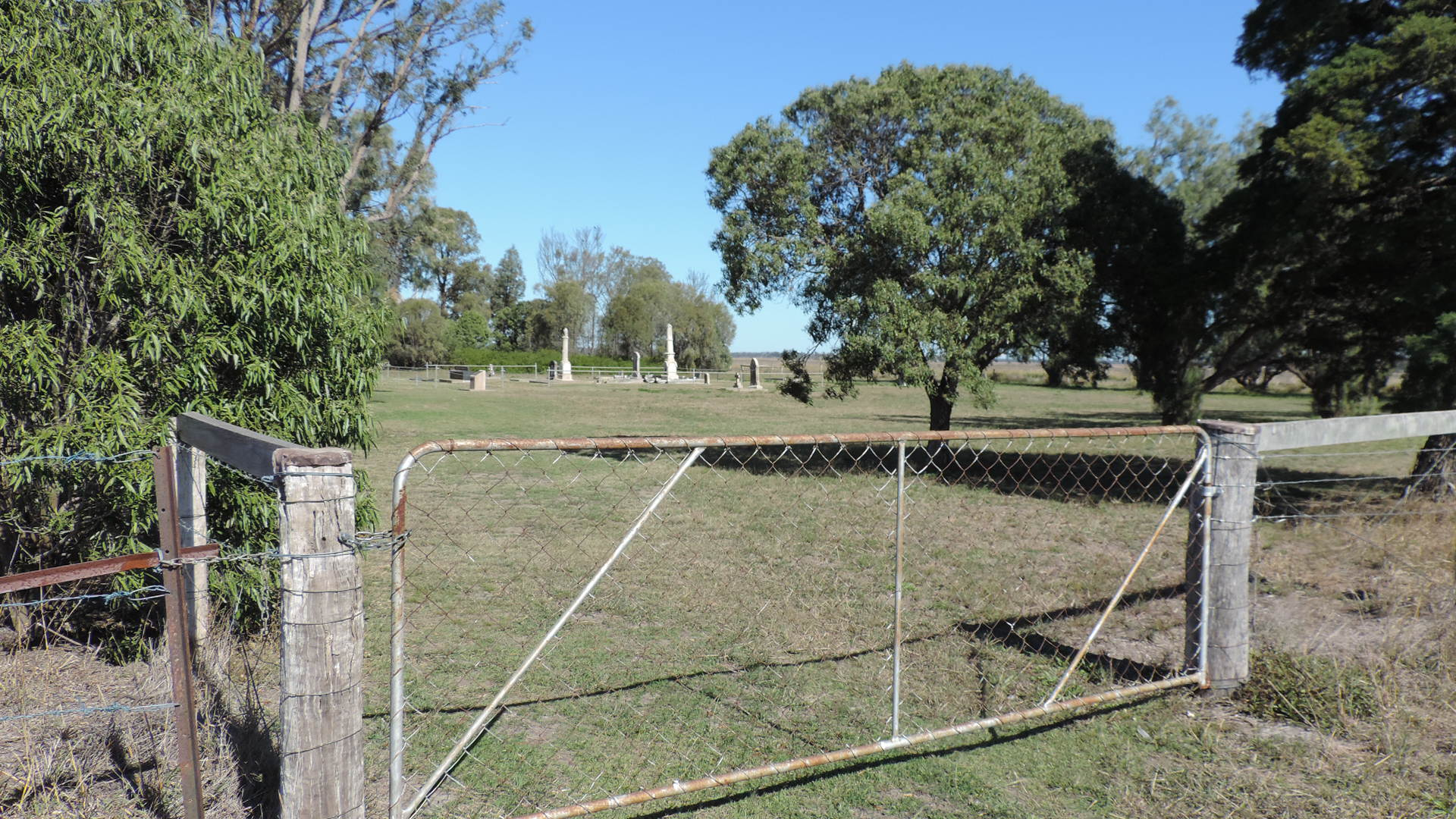
North Branch cemetery, 2015

North Branch Private Cemetery is on Gunbower Road (27.8268°S 151.6166°E).
