= Felton South, Queensland =

Felton South
- Suburb
- Interactive map of Felton South
- Coordinates: 27.8819°S 151.7177°E
- Country: Australia
- State: Queensland
- LGA: Toowoomba Region
- Location: 24.2 km (15.0 mi) WNW of Clifton; 26.7 km (16.6 mi) SSE of Pittsworth; 43.9 km (27.3 mi) SW of Toowoomba CBD; 173 km (107 mi) SW of Brisbane

Government
  - State electorate: Condamine
  - Federal division: Maranoa

Area
  - Total: 68.1 km^{2} (26.3 sq mi)

Population
  - Total: 78 (2021 census)
  - Density: 1.145/km^{2} (2.967/sq mi)
- Time zone: UTC+10:00 (AEST)
- Postcode: 4358
Suburbs around Felton South
| North Branch | Felton | Felton |
| North Branch | Felton South | Back Plains |
| Ellangowan | Ellangowan | Ellangowan |

Felton South is a rural locality in the Toowoomba Region, Queensland, Australia. In the 2021 census, Felton South had a population of 78 people.

== Geography ==
The locality is bounded to the south-west by the Condamine River and to the north-west by Hodgson Creek.

The Toowoomba Karara Road enters the locality from the north-west (Felton) and exits the locality to the south (Ellangowan).

The land use is predominantly crop growing with some grazing on native vegetation.

== History ==
The locality takes its name from the pastoral run name, which was named by pastoralist Charles Mallard in the early 1840s after his English birthplace.

Felton South State School opened in 1929. On Wednesday 5 March 1947, the school was burned down in a fire. The teacher Miss P. Pulbrook and the 14 students of the school used a cottage provided by Mr P. J. Kelleher as temporary premises. Less than two weeks later, the cottage was also burned down, leading to the belief that the fires were deliberately started. While an official inquiry decided the fires were deliberately lit, no suspects were identified. The school closed circa 1952. It was on the western side of the Toowoomba Karara Road (27.86990°S 151.72310°E).

== Demographics ==
In the 2016 census, Felton South had a population of 65 people.

In the 2021 census, Felton South had a population of 78 people.

== Education ==
There are no schools in Felton South. The nearest government primary schools are Back Plains State School in neighbouring Back Plains to the east and Pittsworth State School in Pittsworth to the north. The nearest government secondary schools are Pittsworth State High School in Pittsworth and Clifton State High School in Clifton to the east.
