= Ellangowan, Queensland =

Ellangowan
- Suburb
- Interactive map of Ellangowan
- Coordinates: 27.9319°S 151.6844°E
- Country: Australia
- State: Queensland
- LGA: Toowoomba Region
- Location: 19.0 km (11.8 mi) W of Clifton; 33.5 km (20.8 mi) S of Pittsworth; 55.9 km (34.7 mi) SW of Toowoomba CBD; 59.8 km (37.2 mi) E of Millmerran; 185 km (115 mi) WSW of Brisbane

Government
  - State electorate: Condamine
  - Federal division: Maranoa

Area
  - Total: 122.3 km^{2} (47.2 sq mi)

Population
  - Total: 95 (2021 census)
  - Density: 0.777/km^{2} (2.012/sq mi)
- Time zone: UTC+10:00 (AEST)
- Postcode: 4361
Suburbs around Ellangowan
North Branch	Felton South	Back Plains
Tummaville	Ellangowan	Ryeford; Sandy Camp
Leyburn	Old Talgai	Victoria Hill

Ellangowan is a rural locality in the Toowoomba Region, Queensland, Australia. In the 2021 census, Ellangowan had a population of 95 people.

== Geography ==
The Condamine River forms the south-east boundary of the locality with Sandy Camp and then flows through the locality where it forms part of its northern boundary with Felton South.

The land use is a mixture of crop growing (particularly in areas near the Condamine River) and grazing on native vegetation.

The Toowoomba–Karara Road (State Route 48) runs through the locality from north (Felton South) to south-west (Leyburn).

== History ==
The locality is named after the property of John Thane who established it in 1842.

Ellangowan Provisional School opened on 12 August 1885. On 1 January 1909, it became Ellangowan State School. It closed in 1917, but reopened briefly in 1922 as a half-time school in conjunction with Tooth State School (meaning the two schools shared one teacher). In 1924, it reopened again as a half-time school in conjunction with Strathane State School. Following the permanent closure of Strathane State School in 1927, Ellangowan State School became a full-time school again. Due to low student numbers, it closed in 1952. In 1958, it reopened and then closed finally in 1967. It was on the Clifton–Leyburn Road (approx 27.93980°S 151.72664°E).

Strathane Provisional opened circa 1898. On 1 January 1909, it became Strathane State School. In 1924, it became a part-time school with Ellangowan State School (they shared the teacher between the two schools). Due to low attendances, it closed in late 1926 or early 1927.

== Demographics ==
In the 2016 census, Ellangowan had a population of 121 people.

In the 2021 census, Ellangowan had a population of 95 people.

== Education ==
There are no schools in Ellangowan. The nearest government primary schools are Back Plains State School in neighbouring Back Plains to the north-east and Leyburn State School in neighbouring Leyburn to the south-west. The nearest government secondary schools are Clifton State High School (to Year 12) in Clifton to the east, Millmerran State School (to Year 10) in Millmerran to the west, and Pittsworth State High School (to Year 12) in Pittsworth to the north.
