= Springside, Queensland =

Springside
- Suburb
- Interactive map of Springside
- Coordinates: 27.6733°S 151.5802°E
- Country: Australia
- State: Queensland
- LGA: Toowoomba Region
- Location: 7.5 km (4.7 mi) NW of Pittsworth; 44.5 km (27.7 mi) SW of Toowoomba; 176 km (109 mi) W of Brisbane

Government
  - State electorate: Condamine
  - Federal division: Groom

Area
  - Total: 31.7 km^{2} (12.2 sq mi)

Population
  - Total: 102 (2021 census)
  - Density: 3.218/km^{2} (8.33/sq mi)
- Time zone: UTC+10:00 (AEST)
- Postcode: 4356
Suburbs around Springside
Irongate	Rossvale	Rossvale
Irongate	Springside	Stoneleigh
St Helens	Yarranlea	Pittsworth

Springside is a rural locality in the Toowoomba Region, Queensland, Australia. In the 2021 census, Springside had a population of 102 people.

== History ==
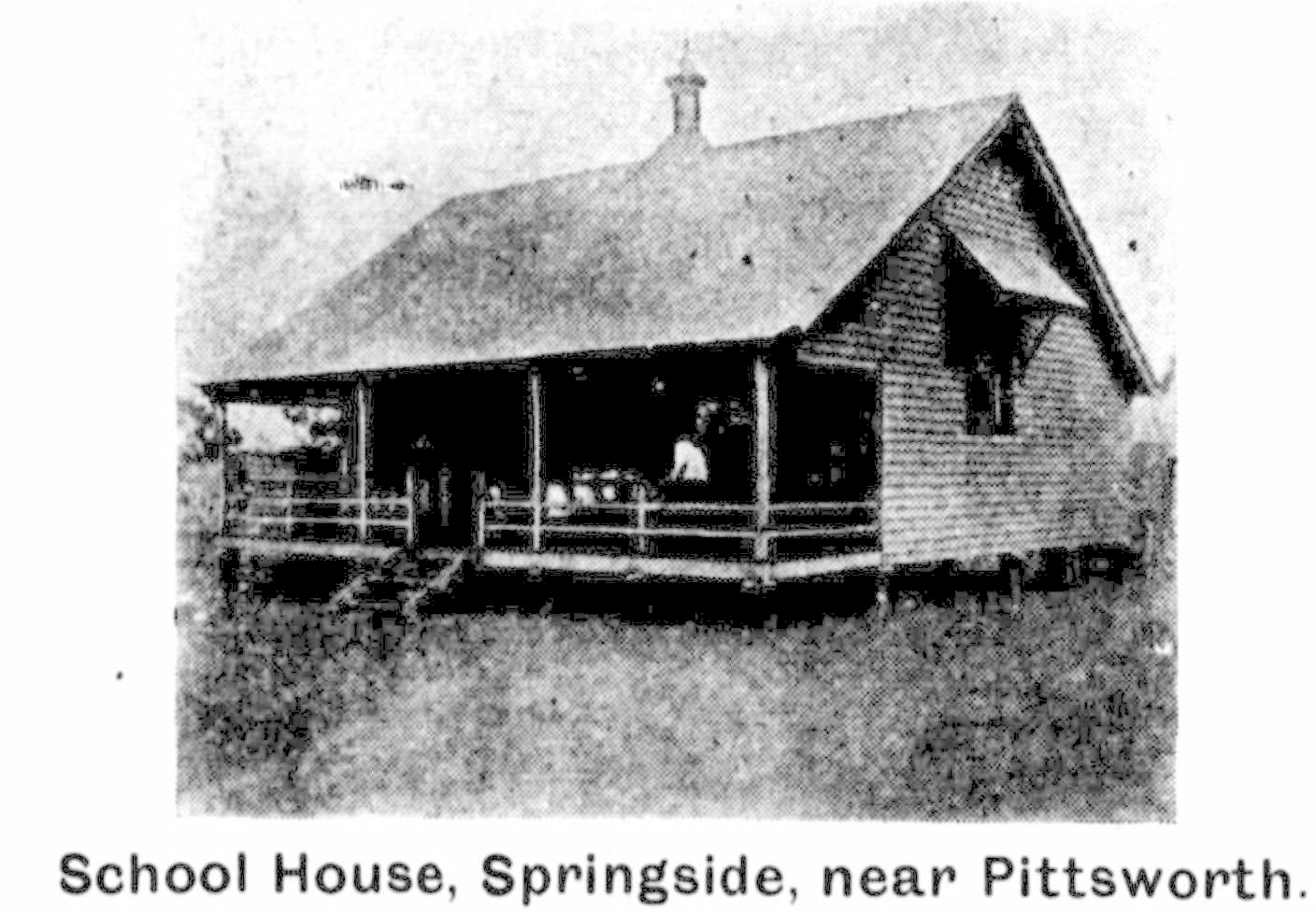
Springside State School, 1901

The first school in Springside was a private school built from slabs on the property of Tom Honor, which was later replaced by larger slab building. Springside Provisional School was built by local parents about one mile south of the earlier school and was opened on 6 February 1888. It became Springside State School in 1897. The school celebrated its diamond jubilee (60th anniversary) on 3 September 1948. It closed on 30 May 1954. It was at 28 Tews Road (27.66823°S 151.58860°E).

St John's Anglican Church was dedicated in 1898 and closed circa 1974. It was at 3237 Oakey Pittsworth Road (27.66860°S 151.59179°E). After closure, the church building was relocated to the site of St Philip's at Mount Tyson for use as a Sunday school and later remodelled as a parish hall. It is now privately owned.

== Demographics ==
In the 2016 census, Springside had a population of 108 people.

In the 2021 census, Springside had a population of 102 people.

== Education ==
There are no schools in Springside. The nearest government primary and secondary schoolsare Pittsworth State School and Pittsworth State High School, both in neighbouring Pittsworth to the south-east.
