= Rossvale, Queensland =

Rossvale
- Suburb
- Interactive map of Rossvale
- Coordinates: 27.6330°S 151.5844°E
- Country: Australia
- State: Queensland
- LGA: Toowoomba Region
- Location: 12.6 km (7.8 mi) NNW of Pittsworth; 45.8 km (28.5 mi) WSW of Toowoomba CBD; 175 km (109 mi) W of Brisbane

Government
  - State electorate: Condamine
  - Federal division: Groom

Area
  - Total: 26.6 km^{2} (10.3 sq mi)

Population
  - Total: 85 (2021 census)
  - Density: 3.195/km^{2} (8.28/sq mi)
- Time zone: UTC+10:00 (AEST)
- Postcode: 4356
Suburbs around Rossvale
Mount Tyson	Mount Tyson	Linthorpe
Irongate	Rossvale	Stoneleigh
Springside	Springside	Stoneleigh

Rossvale is a rural locality in the Toowoomba Region, Queensland, Australia. In the 2021 census, Rossvale had a population of 85 people.

== History ==
Rossvale Provisional School opened on 24 April 1899. On 1 January 1909, it became Rossvale State School. It closed on 31 December 1985. It was at 48 Rossvale Road West (27.6298°S 151.5730°E).

In July 1929, at the Lutheran church in neighbouring Springside, a dispute arose over whether services should be held in German or English, resulting in a split in the congregation. Those wanting English services were prevented from using the church at Springside and decided to establish their own Bethlehem Lutheran church in Rossvale on land donated by William Kelly. A stump-capping ceremony was held on Sunday 25 August 1929. Ross Park (also written as Rosspark) Lutheran Church was opened on Sunday 29 September 1929. It was built at a cost of £340. The church closed in 1966 and was subsequently demolished. The church was at 3 Rosevale Road West (27.63124°S 151.57664°E)

== Demographics ==
In the 2016 census, Rossvale had a population of 75 people.

In the 2021 census, Rossvale had a population of 85 people.

== Education ==
There are no schools in Rossvale. The nearest government primary schools are Mount Tyson State School in neighbouring Mount Tyson to the north and Pittsworth State School in Pittsworth to the south-east. The nearest government secondary school is Pittsworth State High School, also in Pittsworth.
