= Old Talgai, Queensland =

Old Talgai
- Suburb
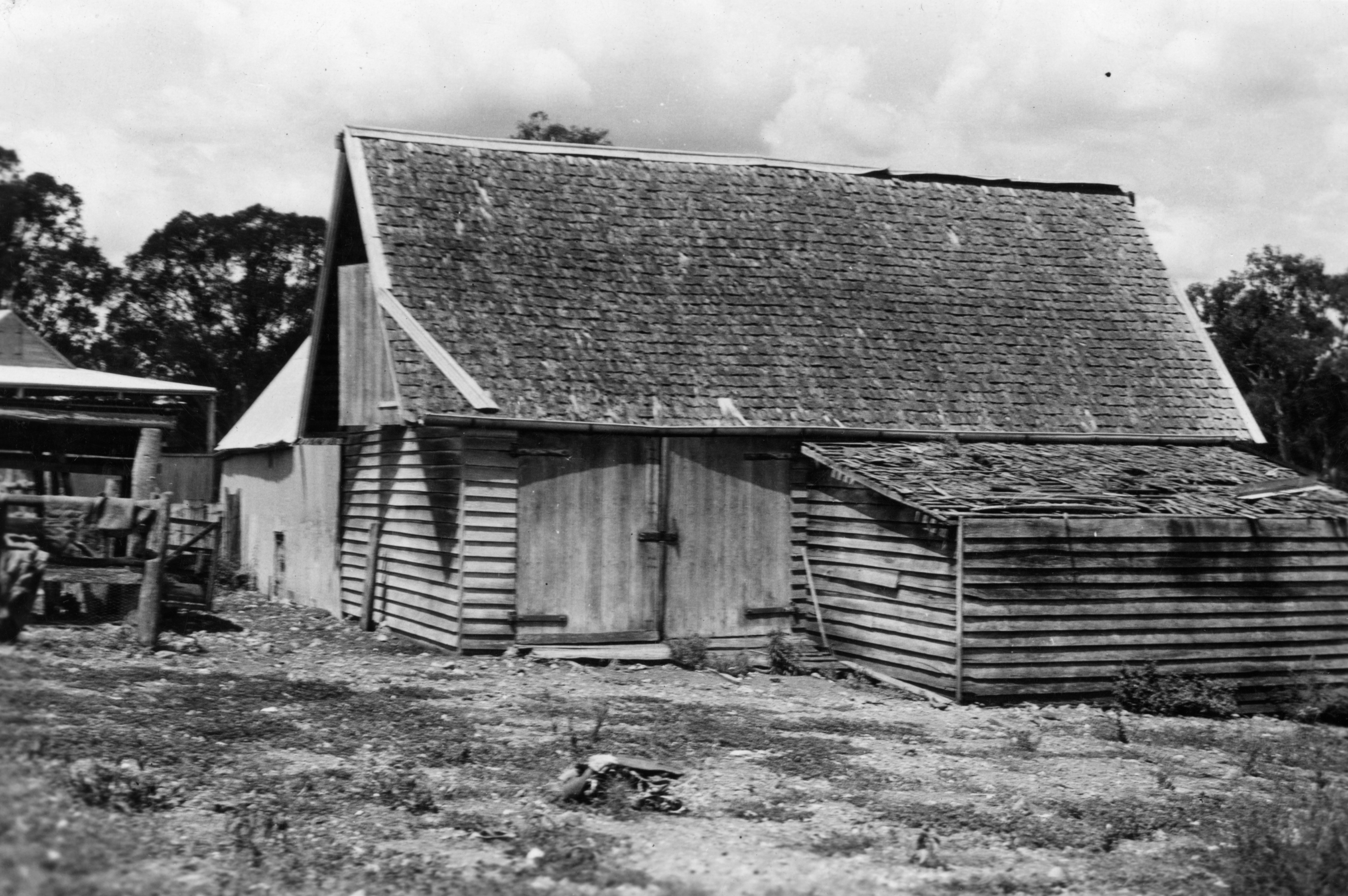
- Old Talgai stable and hayshed

- Interactive map of Old Talgai
- Coordinates: 28.0247°S 151.7244°E
- Country: Australia
- State: Queensland
- LGA: Southern Downs Region
- Location: 21.4 km (13.3 mi) SW of Clifton; 27.8 km (17.3 mi) W of Allora; 44.0 km (27.3 mi) NW of Warwick; 65.1 km (40.5 mi) SSW of Toowoomba CBD; 188 km (117 mi) SW of Brisbane

Government
  - State electorate: Southern Downs
  - Federal division: Maranoa

Area
  - Total: 63.0 km^{2} (24.3 sq mi)

Population
  - Total: 28 (2021 census)
  - Density: 0.444/km^{2} (1.151/sq mi)
- Time zone: UTC+10:00 (AEST)
- Postcode: 4365
Suburbs around Old Talgai
Leyburn	Ellangowan	Ellangowan
Leyburn	Old Talgai	Victoria Hill
Pratten	Pratten	Bony Mountain

Old Talgai is a rural locality in the Southern Downs Region, Queensland, Australia. In the 2021 census, Old Talgai had a population of 28 people.

== Geography ==
The Condamine River forms the eastern boundary of the locality, entering from the south-east (Pratten / Bony Mountain) and exiting to the north-east (Ellangowan / Victoria Hill).

Watts Hill is in the south-west of the locality (28.0425°S 151.7654°E), rising to 510 metres (1,670 ft).

The Leyburn Cunningham Road enters the locality from the west (Leyburn) and exits to the south-east (Pratten).

The land use is predominantly grazing on native vegetation with some crop growing.

== Demographics ==
In the 2016 census, Old Talgai had a population of 26 people.

In the 2021 census, Old Talgai had a population of 28 people.

== Education ==
There are no schools in Old Talgai. The nearest government primary schools are Leyburn State School in neighbouring Leyburn to the west, Back Plains State School in Back Plains to the north, and Wheatvale State School in Wheatvale to the south-east. The nearest government secondary schools are Allora State School (to Year 10) in Allora to the east and Clifton State High School in Clifton to the north-east. There are also Catholic primary schools in Allora and Clifton.
