= Ellinthorp, Queensland =

Ellinthorp
- Town
- Interactive map of Ellinthorp
- Coordinates: 28.0480°S 151.9219°E
- Country: Australia
- State: Queensland
- LGA: Southern Downs Region
- Location: 7.1 km (4.4 mi) W of Allora; 14.6 km (9.1 mi) S of Clifton; 31.5 km (19.6 mi) NNW of Warwick; 66.2 km (41.1 mi) S of Toowoomba; 166 km (103 mi) SW of Brisbane

Government
  - State electorate: Southern Downs
  - Federal division: Maranoa

Area
  - Total: 3.0 km^{2} (1.2 sq mi)

Population
  - Total: 30 (2021 census)
  - Density: 10.0/km^{2} (26/sq mi)
- Time zone: UTC+10:00 (AEST)
- Postcode: 4362
Localities around Ellinthorp
Talgai	Talgai	Talgai
Talgai	Ellinthorp	Talgai
Talgai	Talgai	Talgai

Ellinthorp is a rural town and locality in the Southern Downs Region, Queensland, Australia. In the 2021 census, the locality of Ellinthorp had a population of 30 people.

== Geography ==
Dalrymple Creek forms the southern boundary of the locality and the South Western railway line forms the eastern boundary with the now-abandoned Ellinthorp railway station (28.04856°S 151.92397°E) once serving the town, which is immediately west of the station.

Contrary to the Queensland Government's normal rules that no locality should be an "island" within another locality, Ellinthorp is completely surrounded by the locality of Talgai.

== History ==
The township was known as Talgai before it was renamed Ellinthorp on 19 March 1931. The name Ellinthorp presumably comes from the Ellinthorp railway station, which was originally named Dalrymple after Dalrymple Creek, but which was renamed Ellinthorp on 28 January 1916 after the Tasmanian home of pastoralist brothers Charles George Henry Carr Clark and George John Edwin Clark of Talgai. Although there are over 100 town lots in the town plan, many have not been developed while others are used for farming, suggesting Ellinthorp was expected to be a more populous town.

== Demographics ==
In the 2016 census, the locality of Ellinthorp had a population of 19 people.

In the 2021 census, the locality of Ellinthorp had a population of 30 people.

== Education ==
There are no schools in Elinthorp. The nearest government school is Allora State School (Prep to Year 10) in Allora to the east. The nearest government secondary school to Year 12 is Clifton State High School in Clifton to the north. There are also Catholic primary schools in Allora and Clifton.
