= Felton, Queensland =

Felton
- Suburb
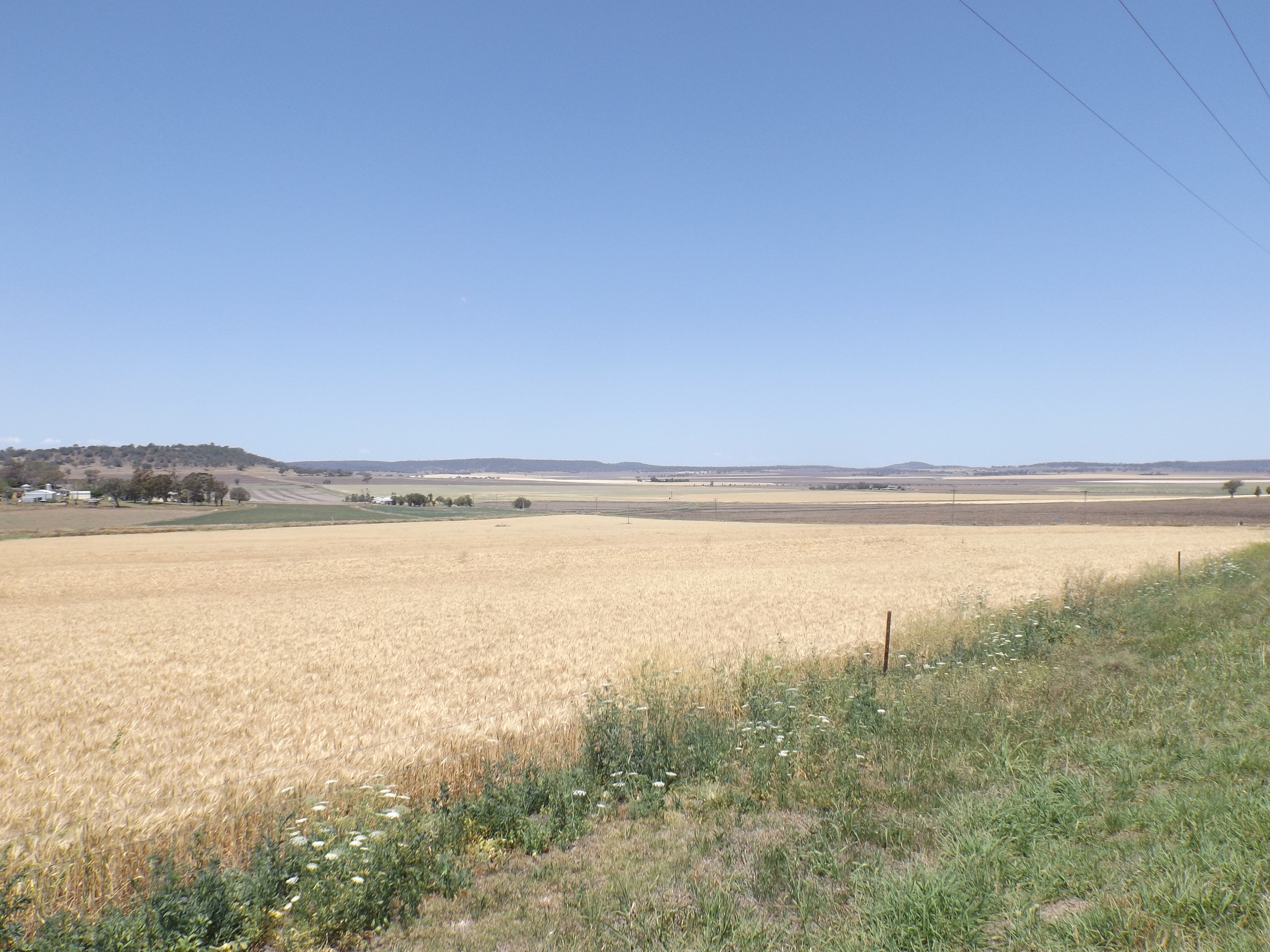
- Farms along Southbrook Road, 2014

- Interactive map of Felton
- Coordinates: 27.7491°S 151.7372°E
- Country: Australia
- State: Queensland
- LGA: Toowoomba Region
- Location: 14.8 km (9.2 mi) SW of Cambooya; 35.6 km (22.1 mi) SW of Toowoomba; 164 km (102 mi) WSW of Brisbane

Government
  - State electorate: Condamine
  - Federal divisions: Maranoa; Groom

Area
  - Total: 172.9 km^{2} (66.8 sq mi)

Population
  - Total: 267 (2021 census)
  - Density: 1.544/km^{2} (4.000/sq mi)
- Time zone: UTC+10:00 (AEST)
- Postcode: 4358
Suburbs around Felton
Broxburn	Southbrook; Cambooya	Greenmount
Scrubby Mountain	Felton	Nobby
North Branch	Felton South	Back Plains

Felton is a rural locality in the Toowoomba Region, Queensland, Australia. In the 2021 census, Felton had a population of 267 people.

== Geography ==
Hodgson Creek flows across the area and forms part of the southwest boundary.

Felton East is a neighbourhood (27.8°S 151.7666°E).

Felton has the following mountains:

- Mount Perkins, named after local politician Patrick Perkins (27.7819°S 151.8141°E) 580 metres (1,900 ft)
- Mount Rolleston, named after Christopher Rolleston, Commissioner of Crown Lands for the Darling Downs (27.7983°S 151.7178°E) 604 metres (1,982 ft)

== History ==
The name Felton is taken from a pastoral run, which was named by pastoralist Charles Mallard, after his birthplace in England.

In 1877, 7,800 acres (3,200 ha) were resumed from the Felton pastoral run and offered for selection on 17 April 1877.

Mount Kent State School opened on 14 May 1883 and closed in 1959. It was on Ted Mengel Road (27.8446°S 151.8292°E).

Nunkulla State School opened in 1912 and closed in 1959. It was at 34 Nunkulla Road (27.77930°S 151.78772°E).

East Felton State School opened in October 1921 and closed in 1967. It was at 2981 Toowoomba Karara Road (27.81674°S 151.75785°E).

Felton Hall was built in 1931. In 2015 a new hall was built by relocating a building from St Anthony's Catholic School in Harristown, Toowoomba.

== Demographics ==
In the 2016 census, Felton had a population of 276 people.

In the 2021 census, Felton had a population of 267 people.

== Education ==
There are no schools in Felton. The nearest government primary schools are:

- Pittsworth State School in Pittsworth to the north-west
- Southbrook Central State School in neighbouring Southbrook to the north
- Cambooya State School in neighbouring Cambooya to the north
- Greenmount State School in neighbouring Greenmount to the north-east
- Nobby State School in neighbouring Nobby to the east
- Back Plains State School in neighbouring Back Plains to the south

The nearest government secondary schools are:

- Pittsworth State High School in Pittsworth to the north-west
- Clifton State High School in Clifton to the south-east

== Amenities ==
Felton Hall is at 2775 Toowoomba Karara Road (27.8018°S 151.7713°E).
