= Scrubby Mountain, Queensland =

Scrubby Mountain
- Suburb
- Interactive map of Scrubby Mountain
- Coordinates: 27.7691°S 151.6011°E
- Country: Australia
- State: Queensland
- LGA: Toowoomba Region
- Location: 12.4 km (7.7 mi) SW of Pittsworth; 50.8 km (31.6 mi) SW of Toowoomba; 183 km (114 mi) W of Brisbane

Government
  - State electorate: Condamine
  - Federal division: Groom

Area
  - Total: 50.7 km^{2} (19.6 sq mi)

Population
  - Total: 203 (2021 census)
  - Density: 4.004/km^{2} (10.37/sq mi)
- Time zone: UTC+10:00 (AEST)
- Postcode: 4356
Suburbs around Scrubby Mountain
Yarranlea	Yarranlea	Pittsworth
Kincora	Scrubby Mountain	Pittsworth
Kincora	North Branch	North Branch

Scrubby Mountain is a rural locality in the Toowoomba Region, Queensland, Australia. In the 2021 census, Scrubby Mountain had a population of 203 people.

== Geography ==
Scrubby Mountain has the following mountains (from north to south)

- Scrubby Mountain (27.7702°S 151.5650°E) rising to 532 metres (1,745 ft) above sea level
- Scrubby Mountain South (27.7747°S 151.5703°E) 537 metres (1,762 ft)
- Gentlemans Seat (27.7948°S 151.6150°E) 543 metres (1,781 ft)

== Demographics ==
In the 2016 census, Scrubby Mountain had a population of 164 people.

In the 2021 census, Scrubby Mountain had a population of 203 people.

== Education ==
There are no schools in Scrubby Mountain. The nearest government primary schools are Pittsworth State School in neighbouring Pittsworth to the north-east and Brookstead State School in Brookstead to the west. The nearest government secondary school is Pittsworth State High School, also in Pittsworth to the north-east.
