= Kincora, Queensland =

Kincora
- Suburb
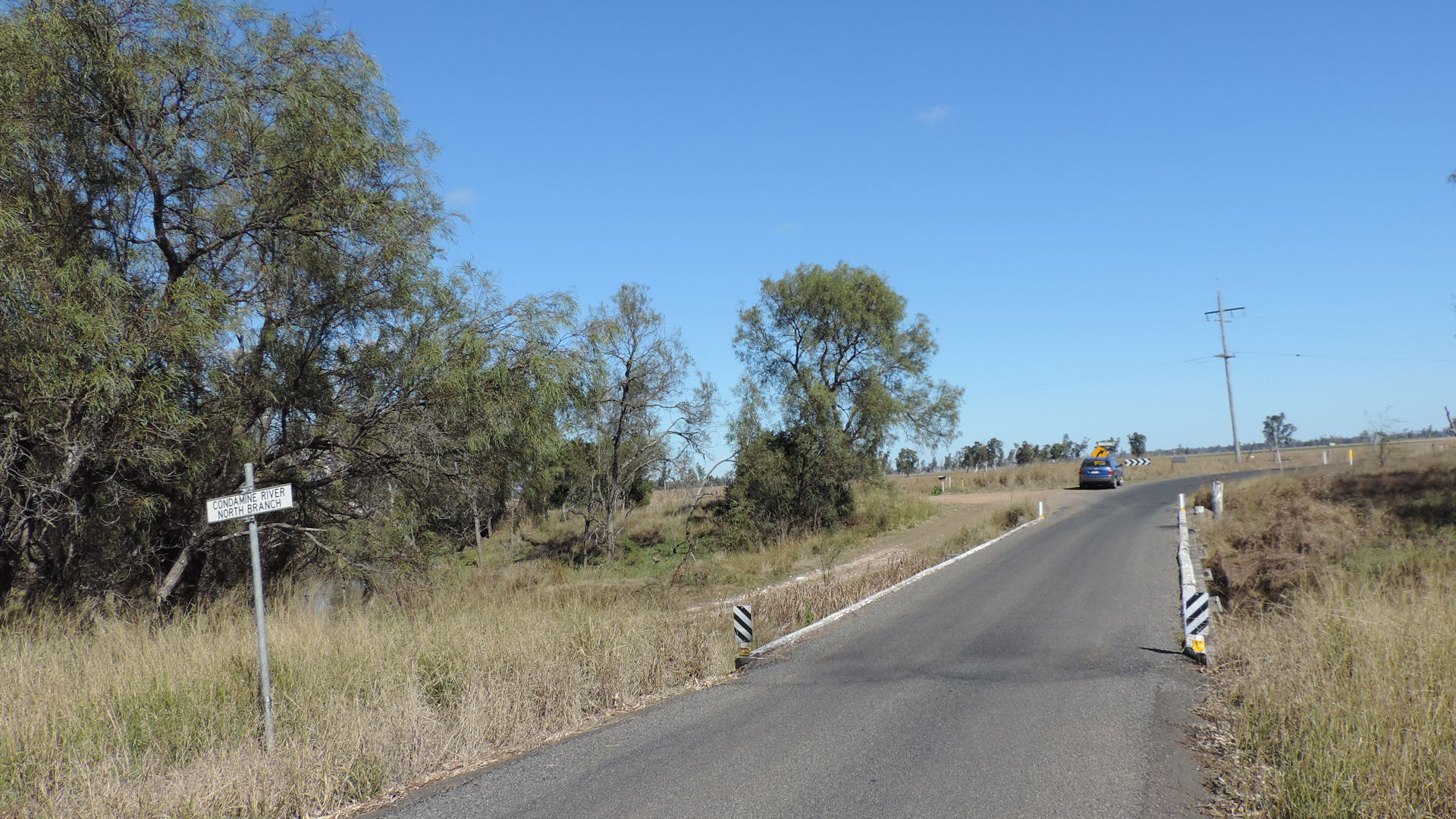
- Looking across the Condamine River from Tummaville towards Kincora, 2015

- Interactive map of Kincora
- Coordinates: 27.7983°S 151.5372°E
- Country: Australia
- State: Queensland
- LGA: Toowoomba Region
- Location: 15.6 km (9.7 mi) SW of Pittsworth; 54.1 km (33.6 mi) SW of Toowoomba CBD; 186 km (116 mi) WSW of Brisbane

Government
  - State electorate: Condamine
  - Federal division: Groom

Area
  - Total: 76.9 km^{2} (29.7 sq mi)

Population
  - Total: 71 (2021 census)
  - Density: 0.923/km^{2} (2.391/sq mi)
- Time zone: UTC+10:00 (AEST)
- Postcode: 4356
Suburbs around Kincora
Brookstead	Yarranlea	Scrubby Mountain
Tummaville	Kincora	North Branch
Tummaville	Tummaville	North Branch

Kincora is a rural locality in the Toowoomba Region, Queensland, Australia. In the 2021 census, Kincora had a population of 71 people.

== History ==
Kincora Provisional School opened on 7 May 1883. On 1 January 1909, it became Kincora State School. It closed on 28 January 1963. It was on a 2-acre (0.81 ha) site on the north-west corner of Janz Road (shown as Keene Road on some maps) and School Road (27.8132°S 151.5584°E).

== Demographics ==
In the 2016 census, Kincora had a population of 57 people.

In the 2021 census, Kincora had a population of 71 people.

== Education ==
There are no schools in Kincora. The nearest government primary schools are Brookstead State School in neighbouring Brookstead to the north-west and Pittsworth State School in Pittsworth to the north-east. The nearest government secondary school is Pittsworth State High School, also in Pittsworth. There is also a Catholic primary school in Pittsworth.
