= Talgai, Queensland =

Talgai
- Suburb
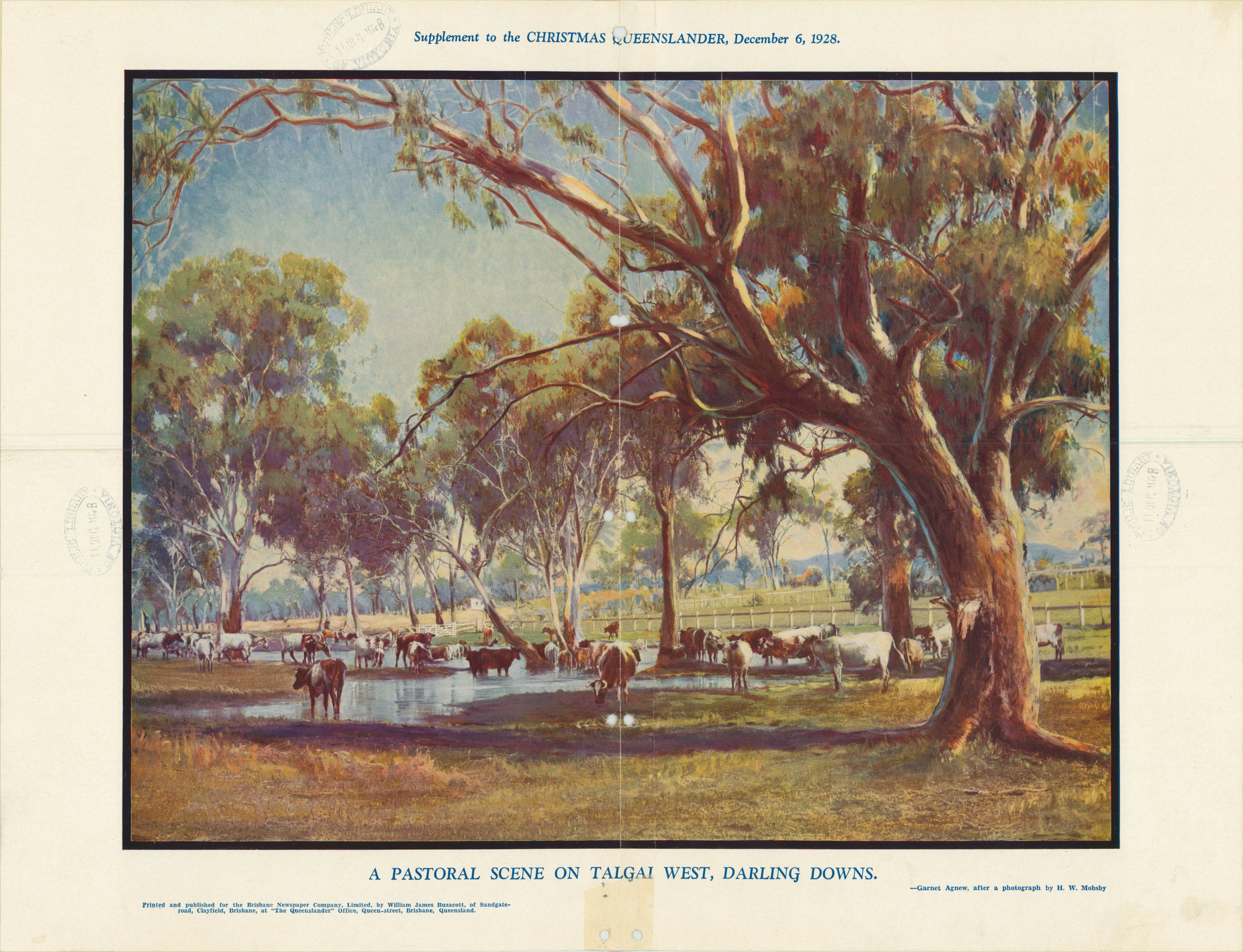
- A pastoral scene on Talgai West, by Garnet Agnew, 1928

- Interactive map of Talgai
- Coordinates: 28.0391°S 151.8819°E
- Country: Australia
- State: Queensland
- LGA: Southern Downs Region
- Location: 9.4 km (5.8 mi) W of Allora; 13.7 km (8.5 mi) S of Clifton; 28.6 km (17.8 mi) NNW of Warwick; 68.5 km (42.6 mi) S of Toowoomba; 168 km (104 mi) SW of Brisbane

Government
  - State electorate: Southern Downs
  - Federal division: Maranoa

Area
  - Total: 77.1 km^{2} (29.8 sq mi)

Population
  - Total: 106 (2021 census)
  - Density: 1.375/km^{2} (3.561/sq mi)
- Time zone: UTC+10:00 (AEST)
- Postcode: 4362
Suburbs around Talgai
| Sandy Camp | Elphinstone | Allora |
| Victoria Hill | Talgai | Allora |
| Bony Mountain | Deuchar | Hendon |

Talgai is a rural locality in the Southern Downs Region, Queensland, Australia. In the 2021 census, Talgai had a population of 106 people.

== Geography ==
The locality of Ellinthorp is entirely contained within the boundaries of Talgai. This is quite unusual in Queensland which does not normally permit such a containment, requiring all localities to have at least two neighbours.

The South Western railway line enters the locality from the north (Elphinstone/Allora) and exits to the south-east (Hendon). The Ellinthorp railway station is an abandoned railway station on the line (28.0486°S 151.9240°E), which, despite the name, is in Talgai but immediately east of the town of Ellinthorp.

== History ==
The locality name derives from the pastoral run name established by G. Gammie who arrived on the Condamine River with stock on 9 March 1841.

Talgai West Provisional School opened on 22 September 1902. On 17 April 1916, it became Talgai West State School. It experienced a number of temporary closures due to low student numbers. On 1 July 1920, it became a half-time provisional school in conjunction with Deuchar Provisional School (meaning a single teacher was shared between the two schools). The school closed on 31 October 1921, reopening on 19 July 1922 as a full-time school. It closed on 27 August 1962, briefly reopened and closed permanently in 1963. It was on the south-eastern side of Dalrymple Creek Road (28.04236°S 151.88648°E).

== Demographics ==
In the 2016 census, Talgai had a population of 106 people.

In the 2021 census, Talgai had a population of 106 people.

== Education ==
There are no schools in Talgai. The nearest government primary schools are Allora State School in neighbouring Allora to the east and Clifton State School in Clifton to the north. The nearest government secondary schools are Allora State School (to Year 10) and Clifton State High School (to Year 12), also in Clifton. There are non-government schools in both Allora and Clifton.
