= Ryeford, Queensland =

Ryeford
- Suburb
- Interactive map of Ryeford
- Coordinates: 27.9319°S 151.8177°E
- Country: Australia
- State: Queensland
- LGA: Toowoomba Region
- Location: 12.6 km (7.8 mi) W of Clifton; 55.8 km (34.7 mi) SSW of Toowoomba CBD; 173 km (107 mi) WSW of Brisbane

Government
  - State electorate: Condamine
  - Federal division: Maranoa

Area
  - Total: 27.3 km^{2} (10.5 sq mi)

Population
  - Total: 54 (2021 census)
  - Density: 1.978/km^{2} (5.12/sq mi)
- Time zone: UTC+10:00 (AEST)
- Postcode: 4361
Suburbs around Ryeford
Back Plains	Mount Molar	Kings Creek
Ellangowan	Ryeford	Clifton
Sandy Camp	Sandy Camp	Sandy Camp

Ryeford is a rural locality in the Toowoomba Region, Queensland, Australia. In the 2021 census, Ryeford had a population of 54 people.

== Geography ==
Kings Creek forms the southern and eastern boundary of the locality.

== History ==
Ryeford State School opened on 8 November 1937. The school celebrated its 50th anniversary with a monument unveiled on 7 November 1987 by Lin Powell, Queensland Minister of Education. It opened on 8 November 1937. In 2016, the school had no children enrolled, having had only 2 children in 2015. It was permanently closed on 12 December 2016. The school was at 968 Clifton Leyburn Road (27.9398°S 151.8134°E). The school's website was archived.

== Demographics ==
In the 2016 census, Ryeford had a population of 57 people.

In the 2021 census, Ryeford had a population of 54 people.

== Education ==
There are no schools in Ryeford. The nearest government primary schools are Back Plains State School in neighbouring Back Plains to the north-west and Clifton State School in neighbouring Clifton to the east. The nearest government secondary school is Clifton State High School, also in Clifton.
