= St Helens, Queensland (Toowoomba Region) =

St Helens
- Suburb
- Interactive map of St Helens
- Coordinates: 27.6775°S 151.4802°E
- Country: Australia
- State: Queensland
- LGA: Toowoomba Region
- Location: 17.9 km (11.1 mi) NW of Pittsworth; 54.9 km (34.1 mi) WSW of Toowoomba CBD; 186 km (116 mi) W of Brisbane

Government
  - State electorate: Condamine
  - Federal division: Groom

Area
  - Total: 46.0 km^{2} (17.8 sq mi)

Population
  - Total: 37 (2021 census)
  - Density: 0.804/km^{2} (2.083/sq mi)
- Time zone: UTC+10:00 (AEST)
- Postcode: 4356
Suburbs around St Helens
Bongeen	Irongate	Irongate
Brookstead	St Helens	Springside
Brookstead	Brookstead	Yarranlea

St Helens is a rural locality in the Toowoomba Region, Queensland, Australia. In the 2021 census, St Helens had a population of 37 people.

== Geography ==
Fourteen Mile Creek enters the locality from the east (Springside) and flows west through the locality, exiting to the west (Brookstead).

The land use is crop growing, some of it irrigated.

== History ==
The name of the locality probably derives from an early pastoral station of N. Gillies.

== Demographics ==
In the 2016 census, St Helens had a population of 22 people.

In the 2021 census, St Helens had a population of 37 people.

== Education ==
There are no schools in St Helens. The nearest government primary schools are Brookstead State School in neighbouring Brookstead to the south, Mount Tyson State School in Mount Tyson to the north, and Pittsworth State School in Pittsworth to the east. The nearest government secondary school is Pittsworth State High School, also in Pittsworth.

There is also a Catholic primary school in Pittsworth.
