= Umbiram, Queensland =

Umbiram
- Suburb
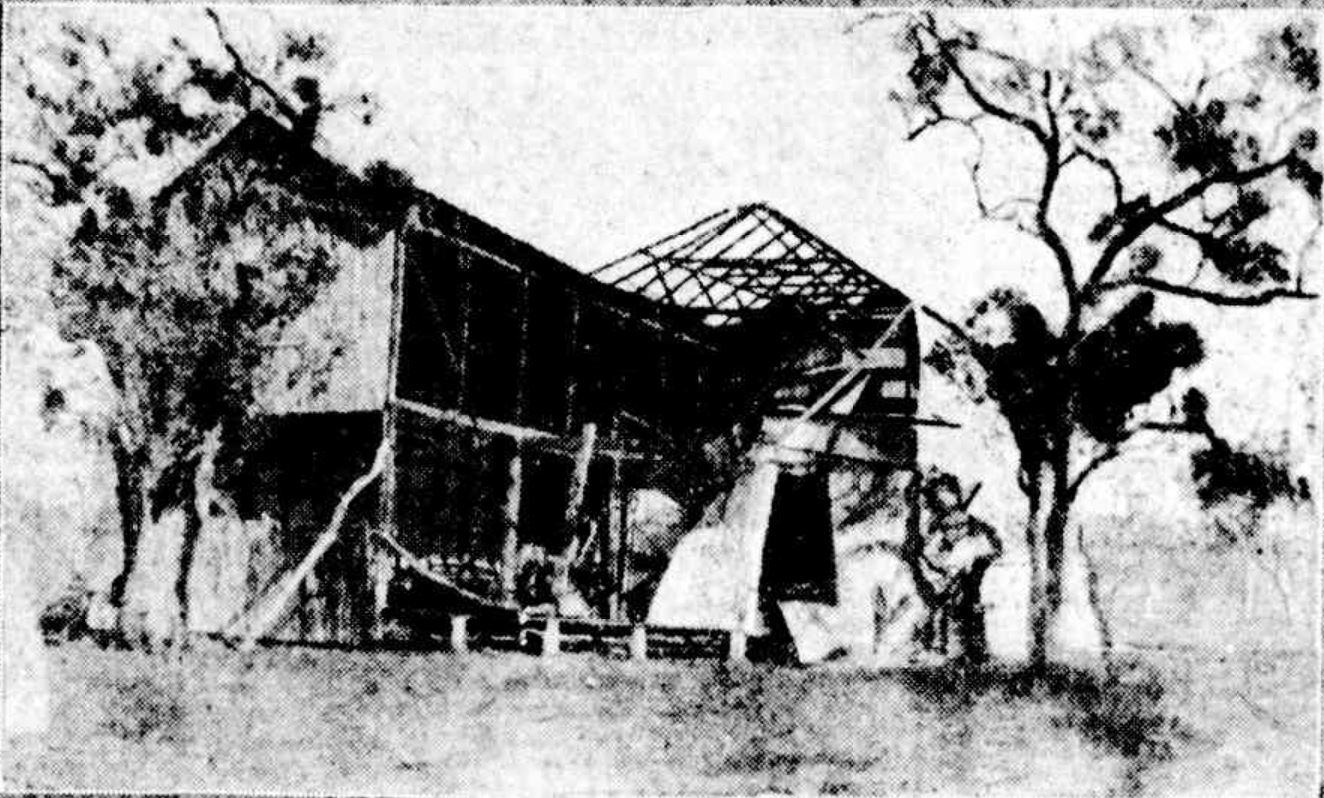
- Storm damage to a shed, Umbiram, 1923

- Interactive map of Umbiram
- Coordinates: 27.6594°S 151.77°E
- Country: Australia
- State: Queensland
- LGA: Toowoomba Region
- Location: 16.4 km (10.2 mi) NE of Pittsworth; 20.0 km (12.4 mi) SW of Harristown; 23.9 km (14.9 mi) SW of Toowoomba CBD; 161 km (100 mi) W of Brisbane

Government
  - State electorate: Condamine
  - Federal division: Groom

Area
  - Total: 36.7 km^{2} (14.2 sq mi)

Population
  - Total: 146 (2021 census)
  - Density: 3.978/km^{2} (10.30/sq mi)
- Time zone: UTC+10:00 (AEST)
- Postcode: 4352
Suburbs around Umbiram
| Southbrook | Athol | Athol |
| Southbrook | Umbiram | Wyreema |
| Southbrook | Southbrook | Cambooya |

Umbiram is a rural locality in the Toowoomba Region, Queensland, Australia. In the 2021 census, Umbiram had a population of 146 people.

== Geography ==
The Gore Highway enters the locality from the north (Athol) and exits to the north-west (Southbrook). The Millmerran railway line enters the locality from the east (Wyreema) and exits to the south-west (Southbrook). The locality was served historically by two railway stations, now both abandoned:

- Umbiram railway station (27.6628°S 151.7730°E)
- The Hollows railway station (27.6569°S 151.8013°E)

The land use is a mixture of crop growing and grazing on native vegetation.

== History ==
The locality, originally named as Umbirom, takes its name from the railway station name, on the Millmerran railway line, which is an Aboriginal word (possibly from the Gooneburra language) meaning winding creek.

The locality was given to be established by W. H. Groom (1833–1901), with some confusion involving Messieurs Arthur Hodgson (1818–1902) and Robert Ramsay (1818-1910).

Eton Vale State School opened on 5 August 1878. In 1888, it was renamed Umbirom State School. In 1909, it was renamed Harelmar State School. It closed on 14 December 1962. It was at 29 Old School Lane (27.6582°S 151.7238°E), within the present-day boundaries of Southbrook.

Flemington Provisional School opened on 18 May 1908. On 1 January 1909, it became Flemington State School. It closed in 1914, but reopened in 1915. In 1918, it was renamed Umbiram State School. It closed on 12 December 1975. It was at 366 Umbiram School Road (27.66082°S 151.77171°E). The school building was relocated to Leslie Dam.

== Demographics ==
In the 2016 census, Umbiram had a population of 139 people.

In the 2021 census, Umbiram had a population of 146 people.

== Education ==
There are no schools in Umbiram today. The nearest government primary schools are:

- Southbrook Central State School in neighbouring Southbrook to the west
- Bunker's Hill State School in Westbrook to the north-east
- Wyreema State School in neighbouring Wyreema to the east
- Cambooya State School in neighbouring Cambooya to the south-east

The nearest government secondary schools are:

- Pittsworth State High School in Pittsworth to the south-west
- Harristown State High School in Harristown to the north-east
