= Athol, Queensland =

Athol
- Suburb
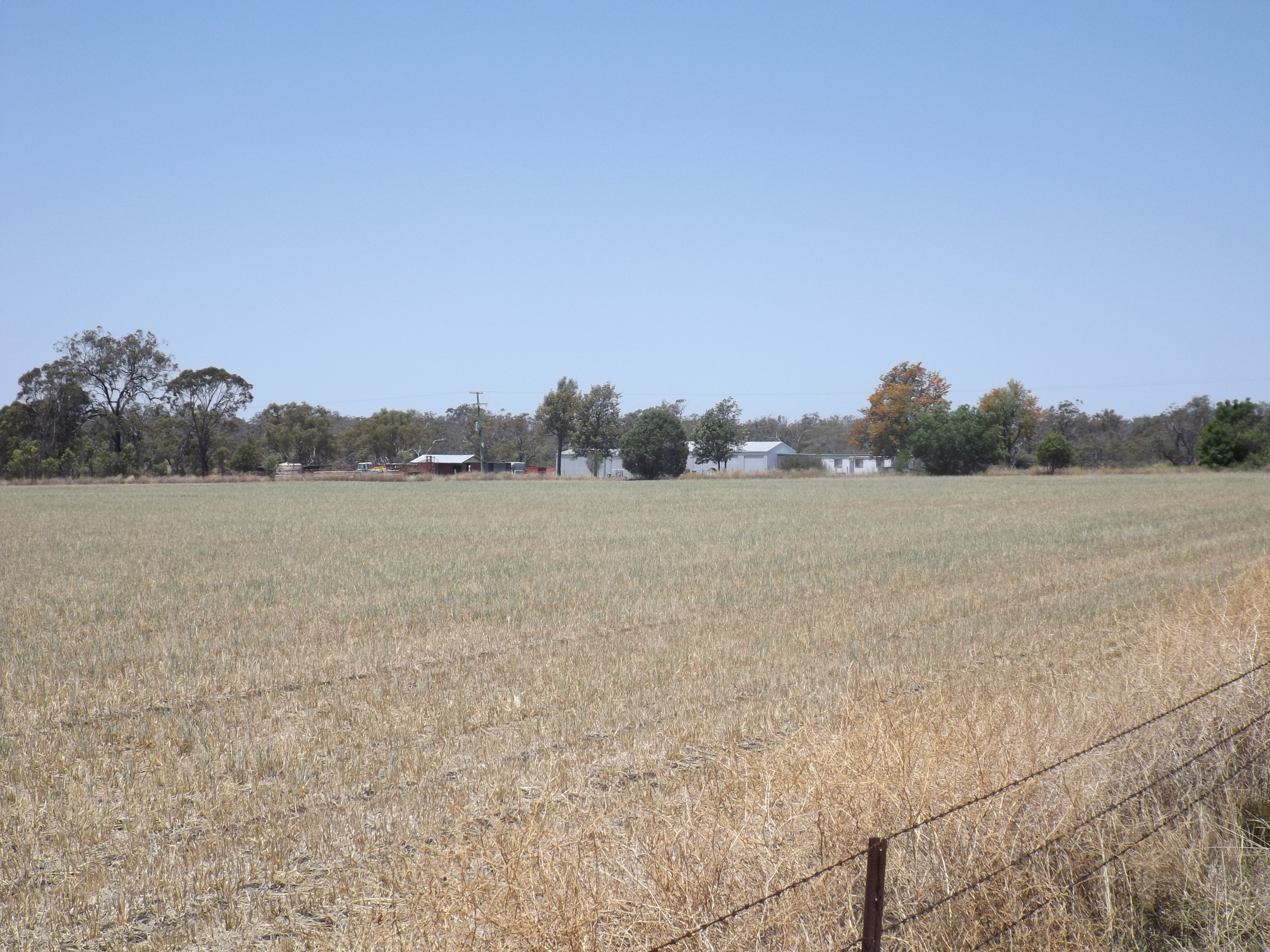
- Fields along Biddeston Southbrook Road, 2014

- Interactive map of Athol
- Coordinates: 27.6194°S 151.7702°E
- Country: Australia
- State: Queensland
- City: Toowoomba Region
- LGA: Toowoomba Region
- Location: 16.5 km (10.3 mi) SW of Harristown; 19.6 km (12.2 mi) NE of Pittsworth; 20.5 km (12.7 mi) WSW of Toowoomba CBD; 155 km (96 mi) W of Brisbane

Government
  - State electorate: Condamine
  - Federal division: Groom

Area
  - Total: 26.5 km^{2} (10.2 sq mi)

Population
  - Total: 139 (2021 census)
  - Density: 5.245/km^{2} (13.59/sq mi)
- Time zone: UTC+10:00 (AEST)
- Postcode: 4350
Suburbs around Athol
Biddeston	Biddeston	Westbrook
Biddeston	Athol	Westbrook
Southbrook	Umbiram	Wyreema

Athol is a rural locality in the Toowoomba Region, Queensland, Australia. In the 2021 census, Athol had a population of 139 people.

== Geography ==
The Gore Highway passes through Athol, with an intersection of the following road segments in the locality. To the north-east the Gore Highway is now part of the Toowoomba Bypass, while to the east is the former Gore Highway alignment, now known as the Toowoomba Athol Road (A139). To the south-west is the unchanged portion of the Gore Highway.

== History ==
Westbrook Provisional School opened on 25 July 1887. In 1903, it was renamed Athol Provisional School and became Athol State School on 1 October 1910. It closed on 20 July 1962. It was located on the north-east corner of Athol School Road and Berghofer Road (27.6043°S 151.7504°E).

== Demographics ==
In the 2011 census, Athol had a population of 277 people.

In the 2016 census, Athol had a population of 134 people.

In the 2021 census, Athol had a population of 139 people.

== Education ==
There are no schools in Athol. The nearest government primary schools are Biddeston State School in neighbouring Biddeston to the north-west, Bunker's Hill State School in neighbouring Westbrook to the east, and Wyreema State School in neighbouring Wyreema to the south-east. The nearest government secondary schools are Pittsworth State High School in Pittsworth to the south-west and Harristown State High School in Harristown to the north-east.
