= Yarranlea, Queensland =

Yarranlea
- Suburb
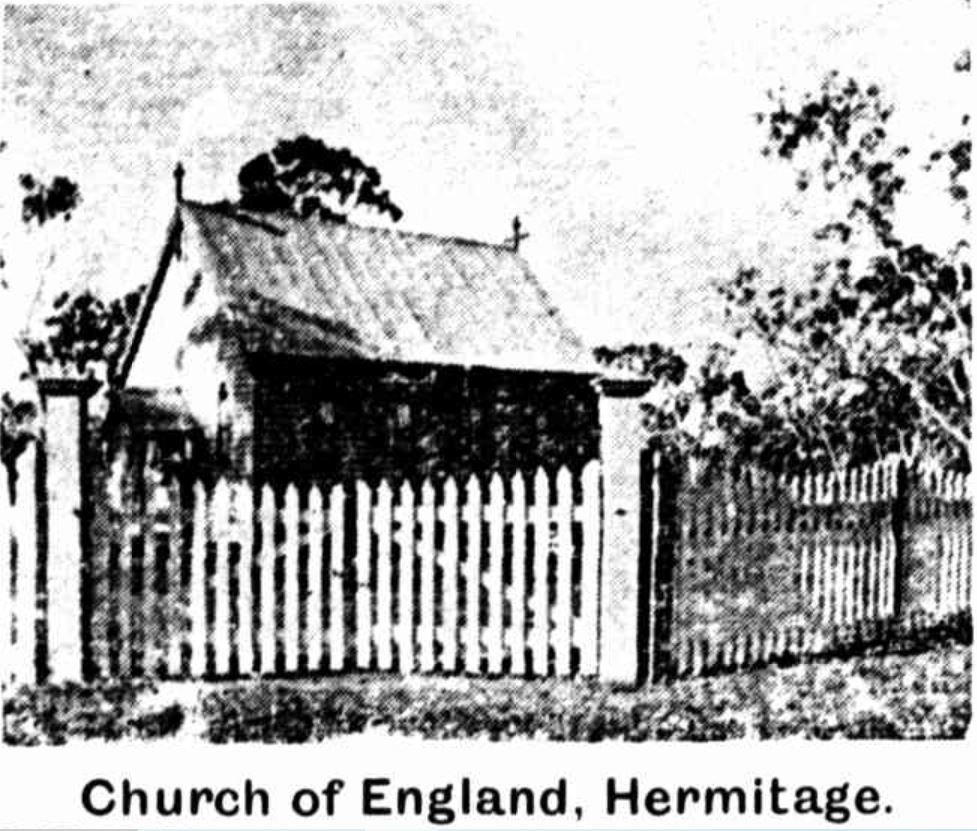
- St Michael's Anglican Church, March 1901

- Interactive map of Yarranlea
- Coordinates: 27.7219°S 151.5552°E
- Country: Australia
- State: Queensland
- LGA: Toowoomba Region
- Location: 14.2 km (8.8 mi) W of Pittsworth; 52.7 km (32.7 mi) SW of Toowoomba; 186 km (116 mi) W of Brisbane

Government
  - State electorate: Condamine
  - Federal division: Groom

Area
  - Total: 58.6 km^{2} (22.6 sq mi)

Population
  - Total: 82 (2021 census)
  - Density: 1.399/km^{2} (3.624/sq mi)
- Time zone: UTC+10:00 (AEST)
- Postcode: 4356
Suburbs around Yarranlea
St Helens	Springside	Springside
Brookstead	Yarranlea	Pittsworth
Kincora	Kincora	Scrubby Mountain

Yarranlea is a rural locality in the Toowoomba Region, Queensland, Australia. In the 2021 census, Yarranlea had a population of 82 people.

== Geography ==
The South Western railway line enters the locality from the east (Pittsworth) and exits to the west (Brookstead) with the locality served by two now-abandoned railway stations:

- Murlaggan railway station (27.7155°S 151.5736°E)
- Yarranlea railway station (27.7262°S 151.5285°E)

The land use is a mixture of crop growing and grazing on native vegetation.

== History ==
Hermitage Provisional School opened in 1883 and by 1900 had become Hermitage State School. In 1901, it was renamed Yarranlea State School. The school closed in 1977. It was at 4688 Gore Highway (27.7530°S 151.5392°E). Note that there was another unrelated Hermitage State School near Warwick. In 1979, the school building was relocated to the Mount Gravatt College of Advanced Education (now Griffith University Mount Gravatt campus) which is located in Mount Gravatt in Brisbane. There the building was initially used as a museum display school, then resumed as a primary school known as Old Yarranlea State School to provide trainee teachers with experience in a one-teacher school setting. Following its closure for cost-cutting reasons, it was re-established as an independent school known as Yarranlea Primary School.

St Michael's Anglican Church was dedicated on 23 February 1891 by Bishop William Webber. On Friday 17 January 1936, it was blown down in a storm. By July 1940, insufficient funds had been raised to rebuild the church. Its altar ornaments were relocated to a children's corner within St. Andrew's Anglican Church in Pittsworth.

== Demographics ==
In the 2016 census, Yarranlea had a population of 90 people.

In the 2021 census, Yarranlea had a population of 82 people.

== Education ==
There are no schools in Yarranlea. The nearest government primary schools are Pittsworth State School in neighbouring Pittsworth to the east and Brookstead State School in neighbouring Brookstead to the west. The nearest government secondary school is Pittsworth State High School in Pittsworth.
