= Broxburn, Queensland =

Broxburn
- Suburb
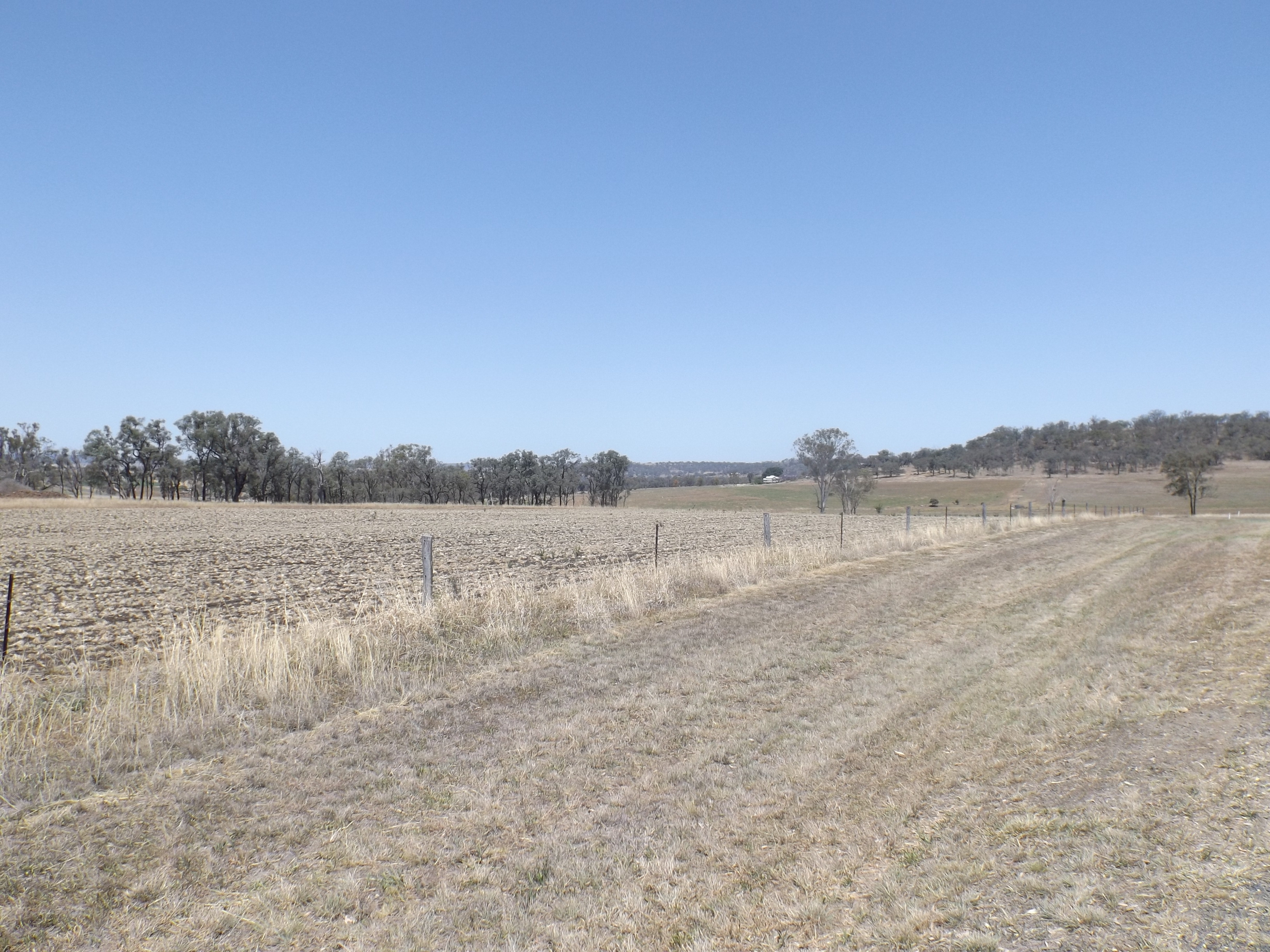
- Farms along Southbrook Road, 2014

- Interactive map of Broxburn
- Coordinates: 27.7316°S 151.7038°E
- Country: Australia
- State: Queensland
- LGA: Toowoomba Region
- Location: 6.7 km (4.2 mi) E of Pittsworth; 37.0 km (23.0 mi) SW of Toowoomba CBD; 171 km (106 mi) WSW of Brisbane

Government
  - State electorate: Condamine
  - Federal divisions: Maranoa; Groom

Area
  - Total: 32.0 km^{2} (12.4 sq mi)

Population
  - Total: 115 (2021 census)
  - Density: 3.594/km^{2} (9.31/sq mi)
- Time zone: UTC+10:00 (AEST)
- Postcode: 4356
Suburbs around Broxburn
Linthorpe	Linthorpe	Southbrook
Pittsworth	Broxburn	Southbrook
Pittsworth	Felton	Felton

Broxburn is a rural locality in the Toowoomba Region, Queensland, Australia. In the 2021 census, Broxburn had a population of 115 people.

== Geography ==
The northwest boundary follows the Gore Highway. Close to the northern boundary is the Millmerran railway line with now-abandoned Greenhills railway station formerly serving the locality (27.6819°S 151.6869°E).

The land use is a mixture of crop growing and grazing on native vegetation.

== History ==
The Broxburn Provisional School opened on 13 June 1898. In 1909, it became Broxburn State School. It closed in 1959. It was on the Pittsworth Felton Road (27.7323°S 151.6746°E), now just within the boundaries of Pittsworth.

Wilga View State School opened on 4 July 1938 and closed in 1959.

== Demographics ==
In the 2016 census Broxburn had a population of 153 people.

In the 2021 census, Broxburn had a population of 115 people.

== Economy ==
There are a number of homesteads in the locality, including:

- Albion Park (27.7167°S 151.6902°E)
- Dalhiem Park (27.7064°S 151.6909°E)
- East Lynne (27.7166°S 151.7195°E)
- Glenhaven (27.6923°S 151.6811°E)
- Greystones (27.6939°S 151.7012°E)
- Helgar Park (27.6976°S 151.6976°E)
- Highland View (27.7166°S 151.6934°E)
- Hulilou (27.7039°S 151.6957°E)
- Nevertire (27.7072°S 151.6907°E)
- Peppertree (27.6978°S 151.7093°E)
- Rockmount (27.7344°S 151.7198°E)
- Rogar Park (27.7515°S 151.7004°E)
- Tullawood (27.7301°S 151.6763°E)

== Education ==
There are no schools in Broxburn. The nearest government primary schools are Pittsworth State School in neighbouring Pittsworth to the west and Southbrook Central State School in neighbouring Southbrook to the north-east. The nearest government secondary school is Pittsworth State High School in Pittsworth.
