= Southbrook, Queensland =

Southbrook
- Town
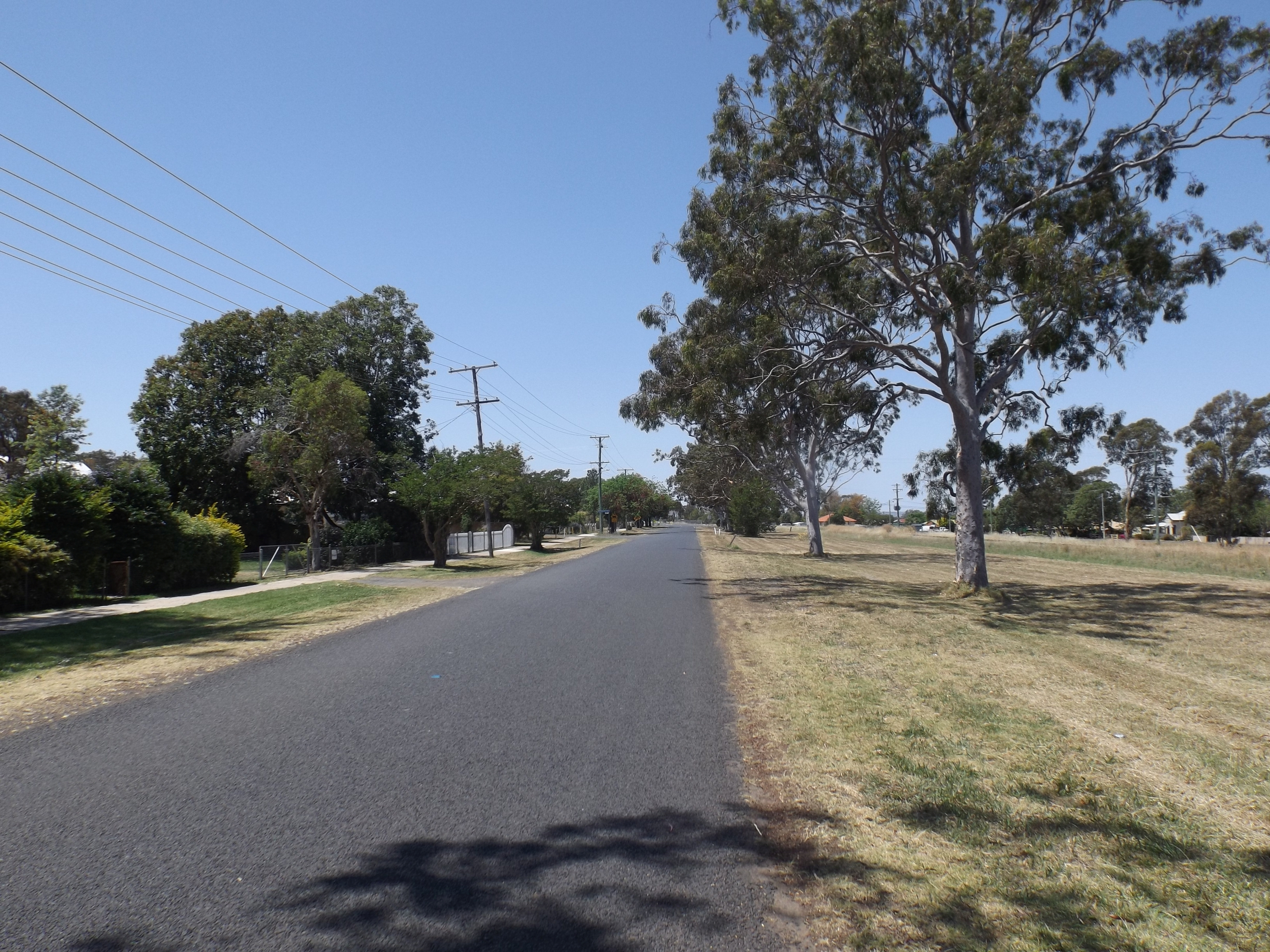
- Oshea Avenue, 2014

- Interactive map of Southbrook
- Coordinates: 27.6783°S 151.7111°E
- Country: Australia
- State: Queensland
- LGA: Toowoomba Region
- Location: 9.8 km (6.1 mi) NE of Pittsworth; 30.4 km (18.9 mi) SW of Toowoomba; 162 km (101 mi) W of Brisbane

Government
  - State electorate: Condamine
  - Federal division: Groom

Area
  - Total: 65.8 km^{2} (25.4 sq mi)
- Elevation: 543 m (1,781 ft)

Population
  - Total: 626 (2021 census)
  - Density: 9.514/km^{2} (24.64/sq mi)
- Time zone: UTC+10:00 (AEST)
- Postcode: 4363
Localities around Southbrook
Linthorpe	Biddeston	Athol
Linthorpe	Southbrook	Umbiran
Broxburn	Felton	Cambooya

Southbrook is a rural town and locality in the Toowoomba Region, Queensland, Australia. In the 2021 census, the locality of Southbrook had a population of 626 people.

== Geography ==
Southbrook is north-east of Pittsworth on the Darling Downs. The Gore Highway passes through the north of the town.

== History ==
Previously under a pastoral run of Eton Vale, the area was further developed in the 1880s when it was used for dairying and cropping. The name has been attributed to be self-explanatory: a running brook or stream.

Southbrook later became a stop on the Millmerran railway line.

Eton Vale State School opened on 5 August 1878. In 1888, it was renamed Umbirom State School. In 1909, it was renamed Harelmar State School. It closed on 14 December 1962. It was at 29 Old School Lane (27.6582°S 151.7238°E).

Southbrook Provisional School opened on 11 September 1882. The first head teacher was George Henry Cooke, from 1 September 1882 to 10 August 1884. On 15 February 1886, it became the Southbrook State School. Whilst celebrating their fifty years golden jubilee with 22 students, the school was closed in 1948. It was on Jimna Springs Road (27.7107°S 151.7317°E).

Circa 1902, the town had a store, a hotel, and two cheese factories.

St Mary’s Anglican Church was dedicated on 30 July 1904 by Venerable A.E. David, Archdeacon of Brisbane. It closed on 12 May 1996. Its closure was approved by Assistant Bishop Wood.

Harrow State School opened on 24 June 1909. It closed in 1927. It was on the western corner of Umbiram Banchory Road and Cambooya Felton Road (approx 27.6953°S 151.7774°E).

Elville State School opened on 31 October 1910 with an initial 35 students. The school was named after the site it was built on. Circa 1916, it was renamed Southbrook Central State School. In 2010, the school celebrated its centenary.

Beauaraba Provisional School opened on 1 January 1919. On 1 October 1920, it became Beauaraba State School. It closed on 24 March 1940.

Southbrook was connected to the National Broadband Network in 2014.

== Demographics ==
In the 2016 census, the locality of Southbrook had a population of 599 people.

In the 2021 census, the locality of Southbrook had a population of 626 people.

== Education ==
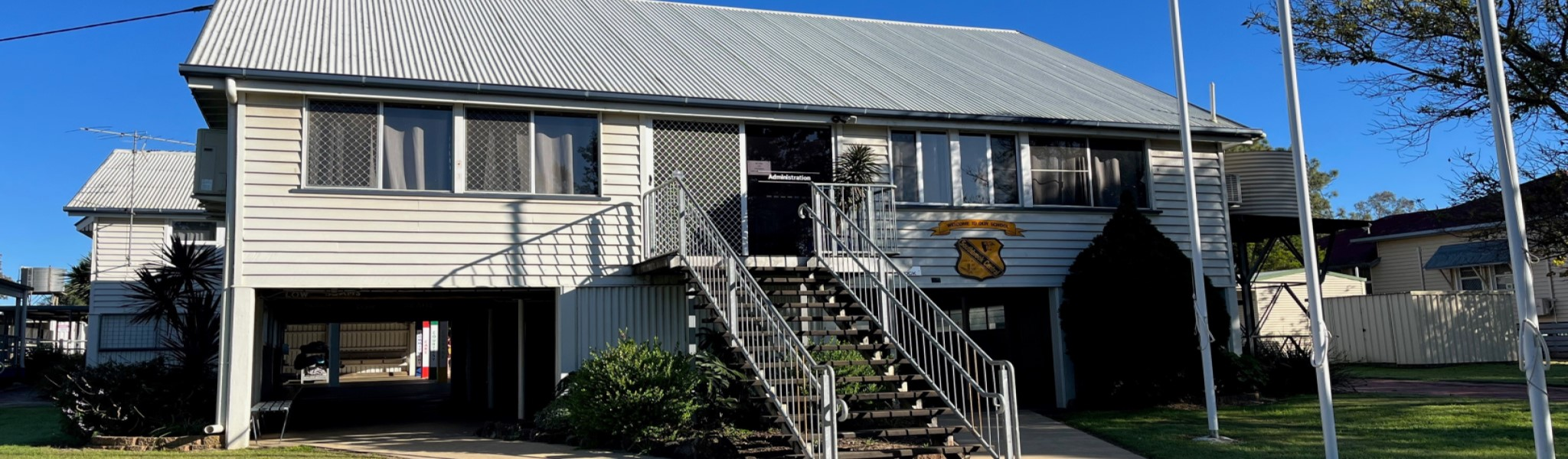
Southbrook Central State School, 2023

Southbrook Central State School is a government primary (Prep–6) school for boys and girls at 1 School Road (27.6781°S 151.7042°E). In 2017, the school had an enrolment of 67 students with 5 teachers (4 full-time equivalent) and 8 non-teaching staff (3 full-time equivalent). In 2018, the school had an enrolment of 64 students with 6 teachers (4 full-time equivalent) and 8 non-teaching staff (3 full-time equivalent).

There are no secondary schools in Southbrook. The nearest government secondary school is Pittsworth State High School in Pittsworth to the south-west.
