= Brookstead, Queensland =

Brookstead
- Town
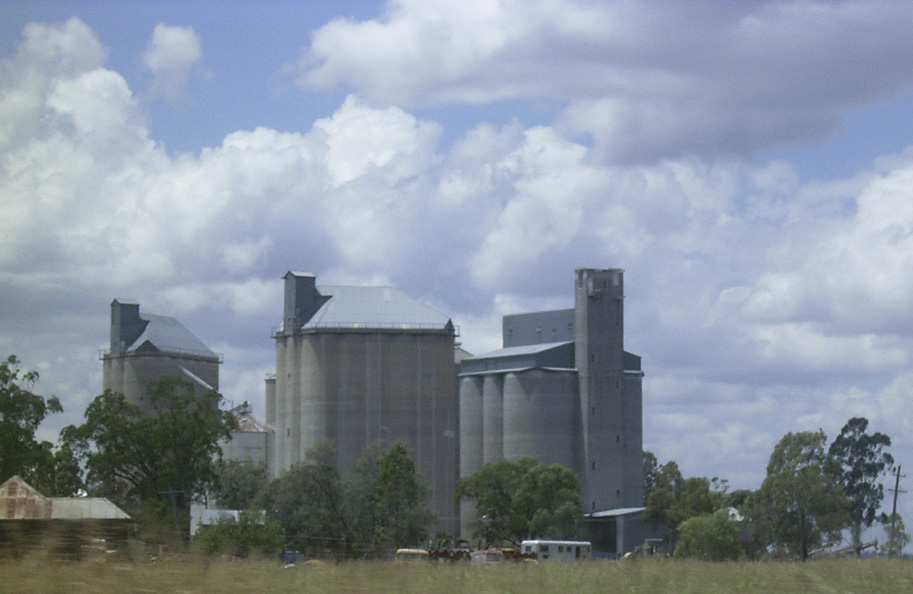
- Grain silos, Brookstead, 2009

- Interactive map of Brookstead
- Coordinates: 27.7580°S 151.4466°E
- Country: Australia
- State: Queensland
- LGA: Toowoomba Region
- Location: 20.8 km (12.9 mi) W of Pittsworth; 59.7 km (37.1 mi) SW of Toowoomba; 192 km (119 mi) WSW of Brisbane

Government
  - State electorate: Condamine
  - Federal division: Groom

Area
  - Total: 150.5 km^{2} (58.1 sq mi)

Population
  - Total: 182 (2021 census)
  - Density: 1.209/km^{2} (3.132/sq mi)
- Time zone: UTC+10:00 (AEST)
- Postcode: 4364
Localities around Brookstead
Branchview	Bongeen	St Helens
Condamine Plains	Brookstead	Yarranlea
Pampas	Tummaville	Kincora

Brookstead is a rural town and locality in the Toowoomba Region, Queensland, Australia. In the 2021 census, the locality of Brookstead had a population of 182 people.

== Geography ==
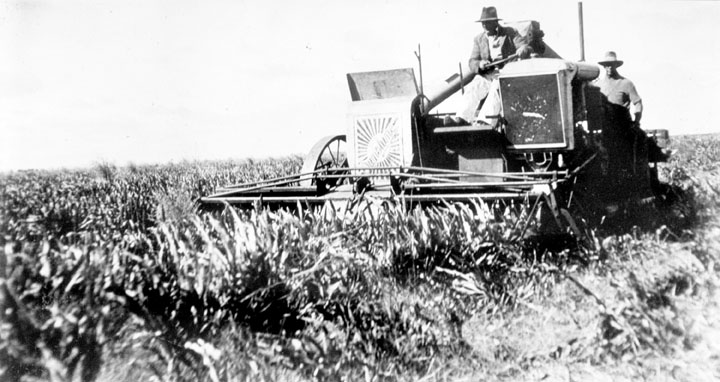
Harvesting sorghum, circa 1938

The town is located in the south-west of the locality. The North Branch of the Condamine River forms the western boundary of the locality. The land is flat freehold farmland (approx 400 metres above sea level) and is used to grow crops, such as sorgum, corn and wheat.

St Ronans is a neighbourhood in the west of the locality (27.7333°S 151.4°E).

The Gore Highway traverses the locality from the south-east to the south-west slightly bypassing the town. At the bypass is the junction with the Brookstead Norworth Road which exits the locality through the north-west. The Millmerran railway line also traverses from the south-east to the south-west through the locality, passing through the town, which is serviced by the Brookstead railway station (27.7603°S 151.4464°E).

== History ==
The name Brookstead is derived from brook indicating creek/watercourse, and stede (Dutch) or stadt (German) indicating place, together meaning a creek-side camping place.

On 21 January 1908, local residents requested a school but there was a dispute about the best location for the school and the government did not proceed with a school. In January 1913, residents again requested a school, but remained divided as to its location. A school inspector visited the district and recommended a specific site on the main Pittsworth Road and the government agreed to erect a 24 by 16 feet (7.3 by 4.9 m) school building. However, the local residents disagreed with the proposed location and instead the local school building committee purchased a 6-acre (2.4 ha) site from B. T. Howells, the secretary of the school building committee. The site was on Pittsworth Road about half a mile east of Brookstead railway station and to the south of the intersection of the railway line and the Gore Highway. Brookstead State School was officially opened on 25 January 1915 by Donald Mackintosh, the Member of the Queensland Legislative Assembly for Pittsworth. The first head teacher was Emily Kate Cottle. Following ongoing problems with the school grounds being waterlogged after heavy rains, in 1951 the school building was relocated to its present site with an adjacent teacher's residence built in 1958. In 1964, the school was enlarged and modernised.

The foundation stone ceremony for St Matthew's Anglican Church was held on Sunday 26 August 1923 with Archdeacon Osborne officiating. The church was opened and dedicated by the Venerable Alfred Davies on 30 March 1924. Its closure circa 2014 was approved by Bishop Cameron Venables.

== Demographics ==
In the 2016 census, the locality of Brookstead had a population of 217 people.

In the 2021 census, the locality of Brookstead had a population of 182 people.

== Education ==
Brookstead State School is a government primary (Prep-6) school for boys and girls at 30 Ware Street (27.7580°S 151.4505°E). In 2016, the school had enrolment of 32 children with 5 teachers (3 full-time equivalent) and 6 non-teaching staff (3 full-time equivalent). In 2018, the school had an enrolment of 25 students with 5 teachers (3 full-time equivalent) and 4 non-teaching staff (2 full-time equivalent).

There is no secondary school in Brookstead. The nearest is Pittsworth State High School in Pittsworth to the east.
