= Back Plains, Queensland =

Back Plains
- Suburb
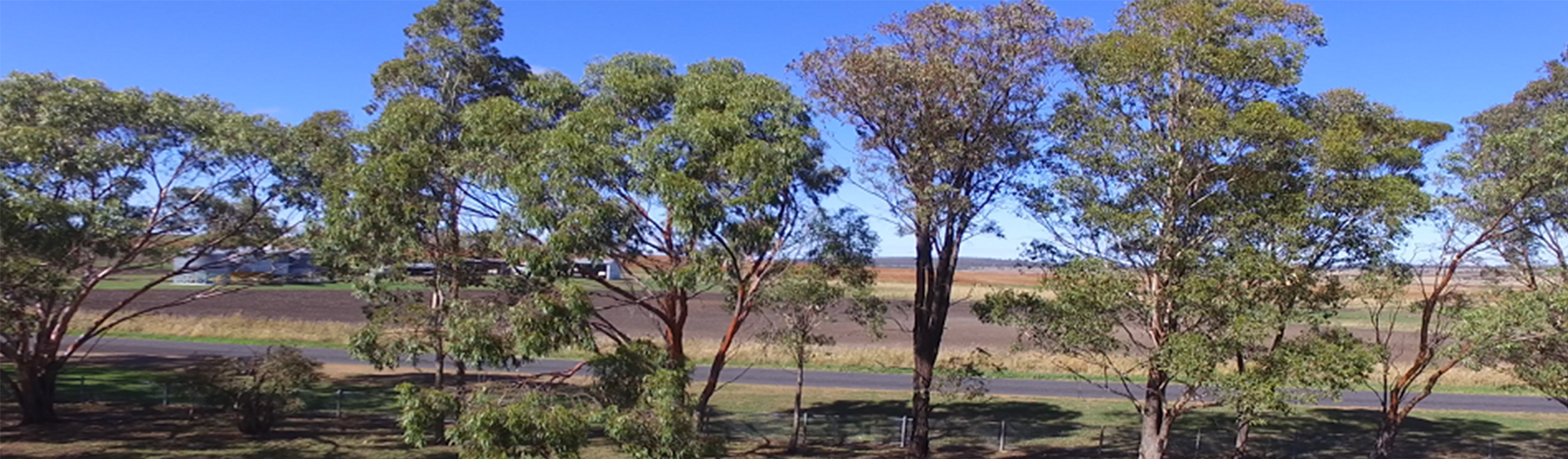
- Back Plains landscape, 2023

- Interactive map of Back Plains
- Coordinates: 27.9°S 151.7833°E
- Country: Australia
- State: Queensland
- LGA: Toowoomba Region
- Location: 14.7 km (9.1 mi) WNW of Clifton; 48.8 km (30.3 mi) SSW of Toowoomba CBD; 177 km (110 mi) WSW of Brisbane

Government
  - State electorate: Condamine
  - Federal division: Maranoa

Area
  - Total: 40.0 km^{2} (15.4 sq mi)

Population
  - Total: 104 (2021 census)
  - Density: 2.600/km^{2} (6.73/sq mi)
- Time zone: UTC+10:00 (AEST)
- Postcode: 4361
Suburbs around Back Plains
Felton South	Felton	Nobby
Felton South	Back Plains	Mount Molar
Ellangowan	Ellangowan	Ryeford

Back Plains is a rural locality in the Toowoomba Region, Queensland, Australia. In the 2021 census, Back Plains had a population of 104 people.

== Geography ==
The land use is predominantly crop growing with some grazing on native vegetation.

== History ==
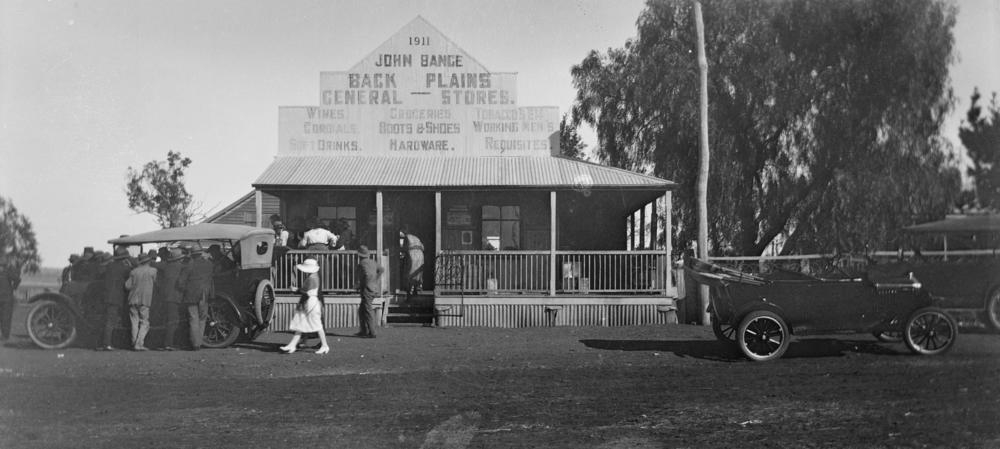
John Bange's general store in Back Plains, circa 1930

Settlement commenced in December 1872. The district was originally known as Clifton Homestead Area Back Plains, from which the present day locality takes its name.

Some of the early farming families were the Naumanns, Rosselers and Lacks.

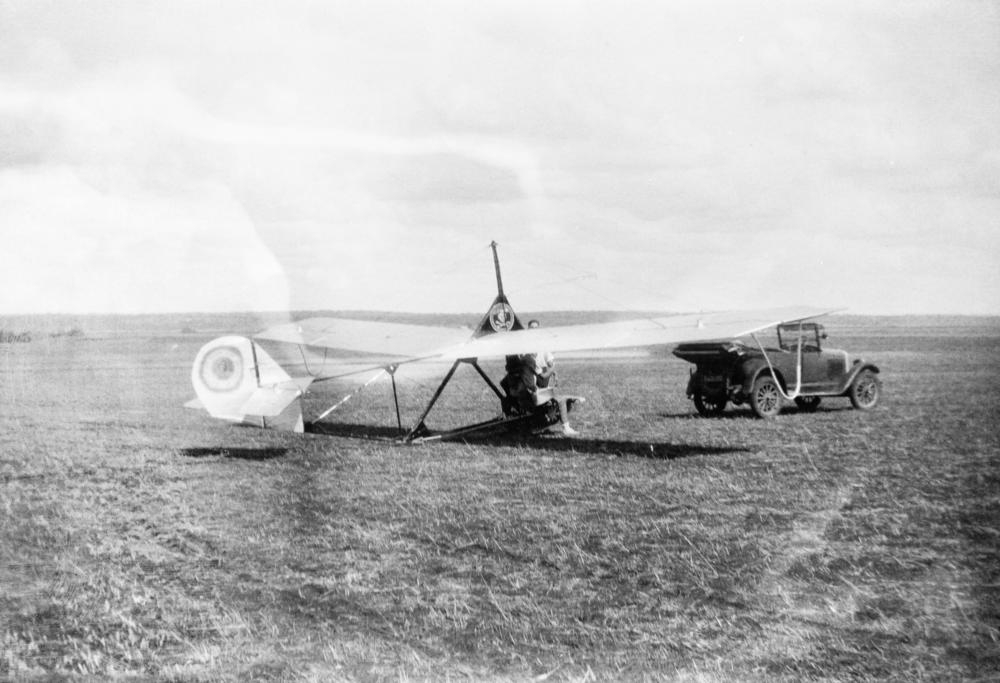
Towing John Bange's glider for launching, Back Plains Clifton district, circa 1930

Clifton Homestead Area School opened on 8 December 1879. It was renamed Back Plains State School in 1918.

St Paul's Church of England was dedicated on 12 February 1892 by Archbishop of Brisbane William Webber. The last service was conducted on 8 August 1943. In 1953 the church building was relocated to Nobby where it was re-established as St Paul's Church of England. The last service at Nobby was conducted circa 11 May 1975. In 1979 the church building was relocated to 12 Jubb Street, Allora to become the Scots Presbyterian Church for those Presbyterians in the district who did not wish to become part of the Uniting Church of Australia. The church in Allora was dedicated on 26 July 1980 by Presbyterian Moderator Rt Rev F. White.

A machinery business operated in December 1892 to 1910. It built threshing machines and steam engines.

A cheese factory was established in August 1896. It became a farmers' cooperative venture in 1910 and closed in 1915.

Sacred Heart Roman Catholic Church opened on Sunday 26 May 1901. It was a 40 by 36 feet (12 by 11 m) hardwood building in the Gothic style with a sacristy behind the altar. The cost of the building including furniture was about £500. It was at 573 Clifton Back Plains Road (27.89546°S 151.80463°E). It was sold in 2002, but, as of February 2024, the building remains on the site.

Johann (John) Bange operated a general store from 1911 to 1924. On 27 October 1935 at Clifton, Bange made his maiden flight in an enclosed-fuselage glider, which he designed and built himself.

Back Plains Presbyterian Church opened on 16 October 1915.

== Demographics ==
In the 2016 census, Back Plains had a population of 74 people.

In the 2021 census, Back Plains had a population of 104 people.

== Education ==
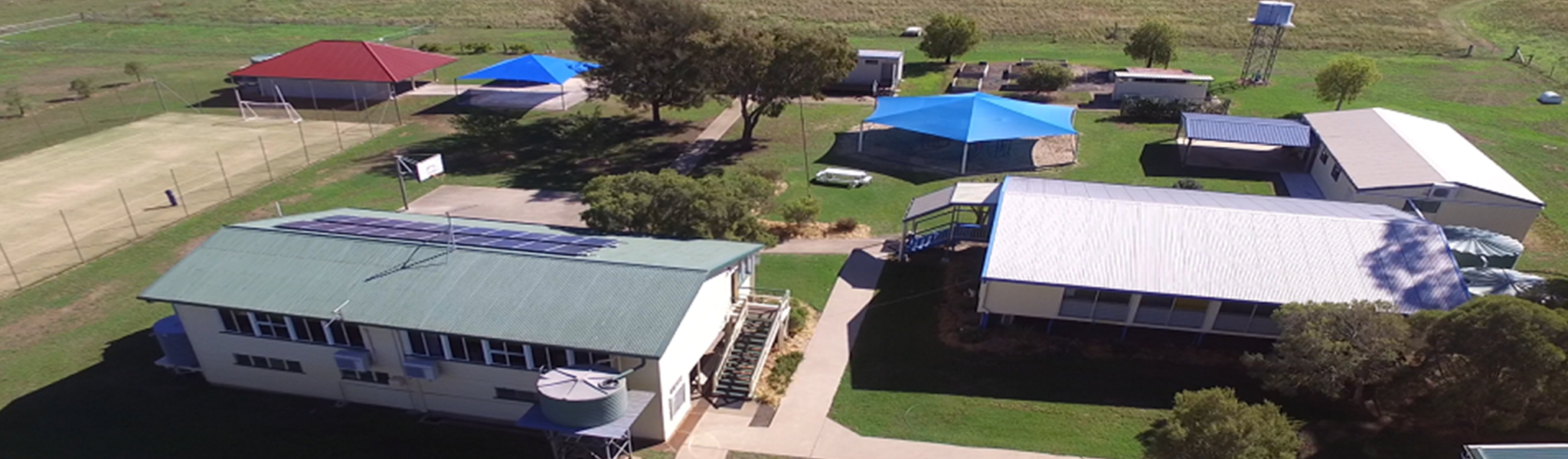
Back Plains State School, 2023

Back Plains State School is a government primary (Prep–6) school for boys and girls at 874 Clifton-Pittsworth Highway (27.8926°S 151.7842°E). In 2017, the school had an enrolment of 17 students with 3 teachers (2 full-time equivalent) and 5 non-teaching staff (2 full-time equivalent).

There are no secondary schools in Back Plains. The nearest government secondary school is Clifton State High School in Clifton to the south-east. There is also a Catholic primary school in Clifton.

== Facilities ==
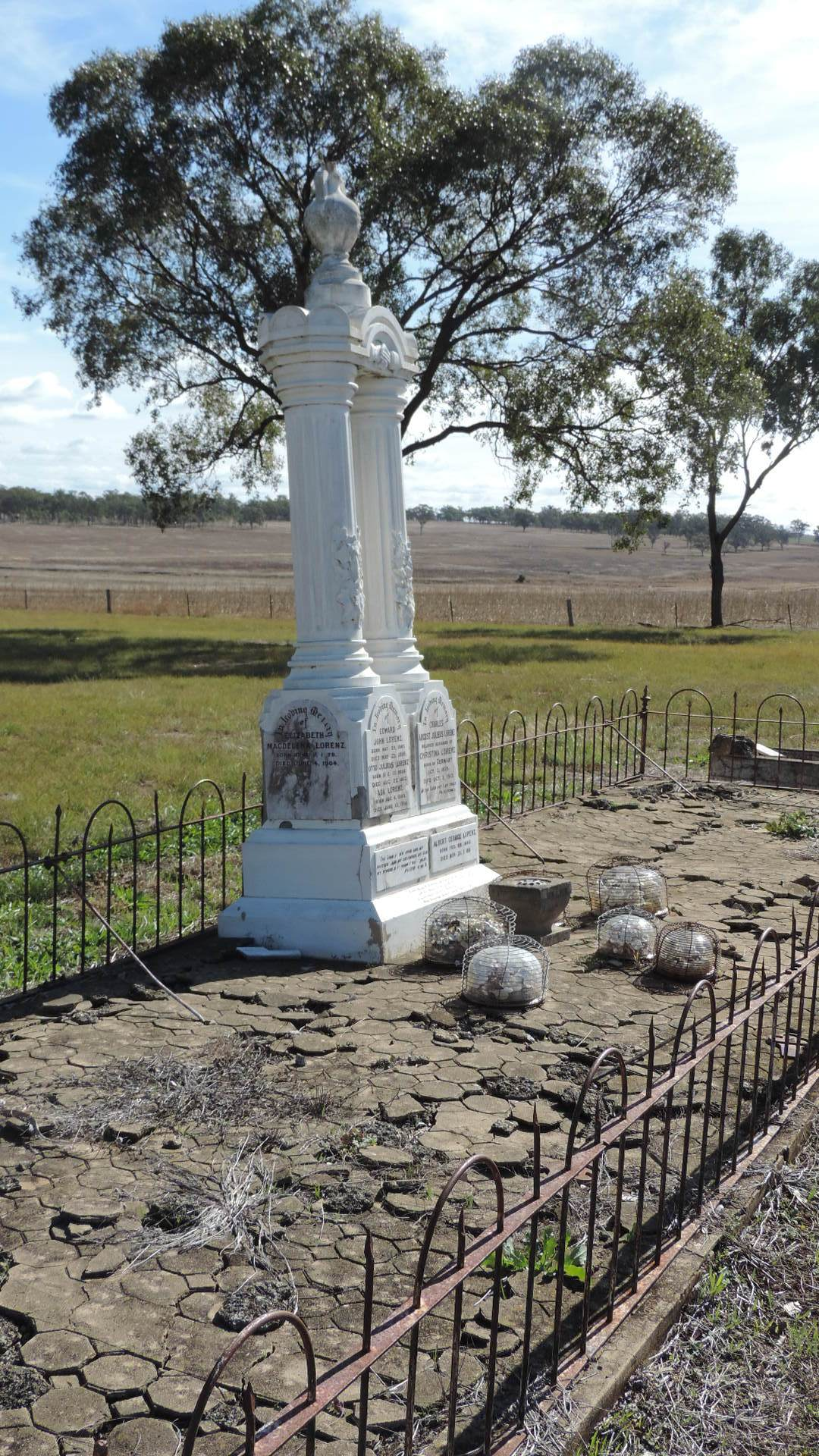
Back Plains Cemetery, 2015

Back Plains Cemetery is on Naumann Road (27.9120°S 151.7979°E). The earliest surviving headstones are from 1899. On 30 September 1944, the Clifton Shire Council became the trustee for the cemetery, which, following local government amalgamations over the years, is now managed by the Toowoowoomba Regional Council. The cemetery is open for burials.
