= Oak Lodge and Spreydon =

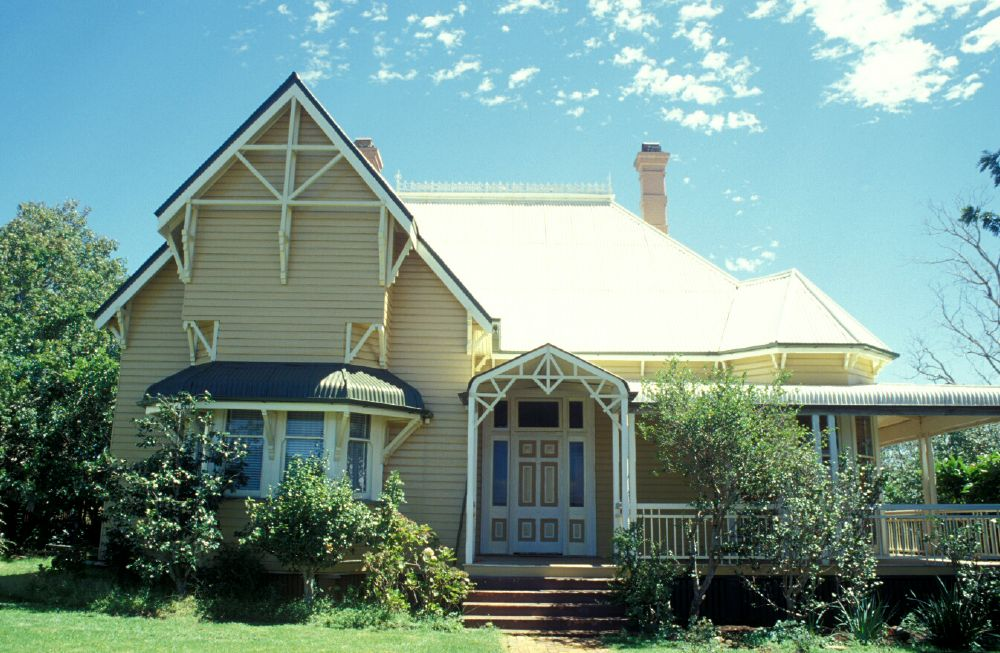
- Oak Lodge

- Location within Queensland Location within Australia
- 27.5564°S 151.9399°E
- Location: 7 Warra Street & 30 Rome Street, Newtown, Toowoomba, Toowoomba Region, Queensland, Australia

History
- Design period: 1870s–1890s (late 19th century)
- Built: 1890s–c. 1923
- Built for: Robert Walker Filshie

Site notes
- Architect: James Marks and Son

Queensland Heritage Register
- Official name: Oak Lodge and Spreydon
- Type: state heritage (built, landscape)
- Designated: 1 October 2003
- Reference no.: 601312
- Significant period: 1890s, 1920s (fabric); 1890s, 1908–1917 (historical, social)
- Significant components: trees/plantings, residential accommodation – main house, garden/grounds

Oak Lodge and Spreydon is a heritage-listed pair of villas at 7 Warra Street & 30 Rome Street, Newtown, Toowoomba, Toowoomba Region, Queensland, Australia. They were designed by architectural firm James Marks and Son and was built from 1890s to c. 1923. They were added to the Queensland Heritage Register on 1 October 2003.

== History ==
Oak Lodge and Spreydon were erected in the 1890s as one house facing Warra Street, at the southwest corner of Warra and Rome Streets, Newtown. The house is believed to have been designed by the prominent Toowoomba architectural firm of James Marks and Son, for plumber and timber merchant Robert Walker Filshie. It was originally a large timber house with a steeply pitched hipped roof and two projecting front gables in the Warra Street elevation. In the early 1920s, the house was divided into two sections, with the southern gabled section and hallway being moved around the corner to face Rome Street, and extended to the west.

Robert Filshie was born near Dumbarton, Scotland. He trained as a plumber and arrived in Queensland in November 1862. Having tried his luck unsuccessfully on the Gympie gold fields he moved to Toowoomba in 1868. In 1870 he established a Toowoomba plumbing business which he conducted for over thirty years. Filshie is better known for the timber merchandising business he established with James Broadfoot and James Marks in 1884, when they acquired the Hampton sawmill as Filshie, Broadfoot & Co. By 1912 this successful firm was one of the largest in Queensland. The Filshie connection with timber ended in 1987 with the closure of a 41-year-old cabinet making business by grandsons Earle and Ian Filshie.

Like many successful businessmen, Robert Filshie was involved with his local community, serving on the local council, and was active as a founder and prominent member of the Toowoomba Caledonian Society, and as a freemason.

In 1885, when sections of rural Newtown were subdivided for closer residential settlement, Filshie took the opportunity to acquire a number of blocks in the area, including over two acres fronting Warra, Rome and Russell Streets, title to which was recorded in his wife's name. Following Mrs Filshie's death in 1887, this property was administered by Robert Filshie until title was transferred to his eldest daughter, Janet Filshie, in January 1893. It is not clear from Post Office Directories or local authority rate books whether Filshie actually occupied any part of this property prior to c. 1904. His home was in Margaret Street in 1887, and he is listed as a Margaret Street plumber in the Directories throughout the 1890s, although this may have been his business address.

By the early 1900s Robert Filshie had erected two adjacent houses on Janet Filshie's property, both fronting Warra Street: the large gabled timber residence at the corner of Rome and Warra streets; and Auchentoshan, at the corner of Russell and Warra streets. Whether Filshie or his family resided in either of these places prior to the early 1900s is difficult to confirm, although he appears to be resident at Auchentoshan, which was also Janet Filshie's residence, by 1905, when he is first recorded in the Post Office Directories as resident at Russell Street, Newtown.

The house at the corner of Warra and Rome streets was a large, imposing, finely detailed timber residence with strong streetscape appeal, likely to appeal to middle class tenants. The distinctive architectural detailing, combined with Filshie's known business association with Toowoomba architect James Marks, suggests that the house was designed by Marks or by the architectural firm of James Marks and Son. James Marks was Filshie's partner in Filshie, Broadbent & Co., sawmillers, established in 1884, which firm likely supplied the timber for the construction.

James Marks was born in England, where he trained as a carpenter, and taught himself building construction, joinery and architectural drawing before emigrating to Queensland in 1866, where he immediately established himself as a builder and architect in Dalby, on the Darling Downs. In 1874 Marks moved to Toowoomba, where he practiced principally as an architect. On his elder son Henry James (Harry) Marks becoming a partner in 1892, the firm of James Marks and Son was established. This firm dominated the architectural profession in Toowoomba and district for more than half a century. James Mark's residential work in Toowoomba includes Weetwood (1888) and Redlands (1888–89), and houses designed by James Marks and Son include Smithfield House (c. 1895) and Vacy Hall (c. 1900).

From April 1893 2 roods (22,000 sq ft; 2,000 m^{2}) at the corner of Warra and Rome Streets (now the site of Oak Lodge) were leased to Margaret Street musical instrument importer George Burnell for 3 years, at £85 per annum. It is possible that the house was constructed by this date, and that Burnell had occupied it as his private residence.

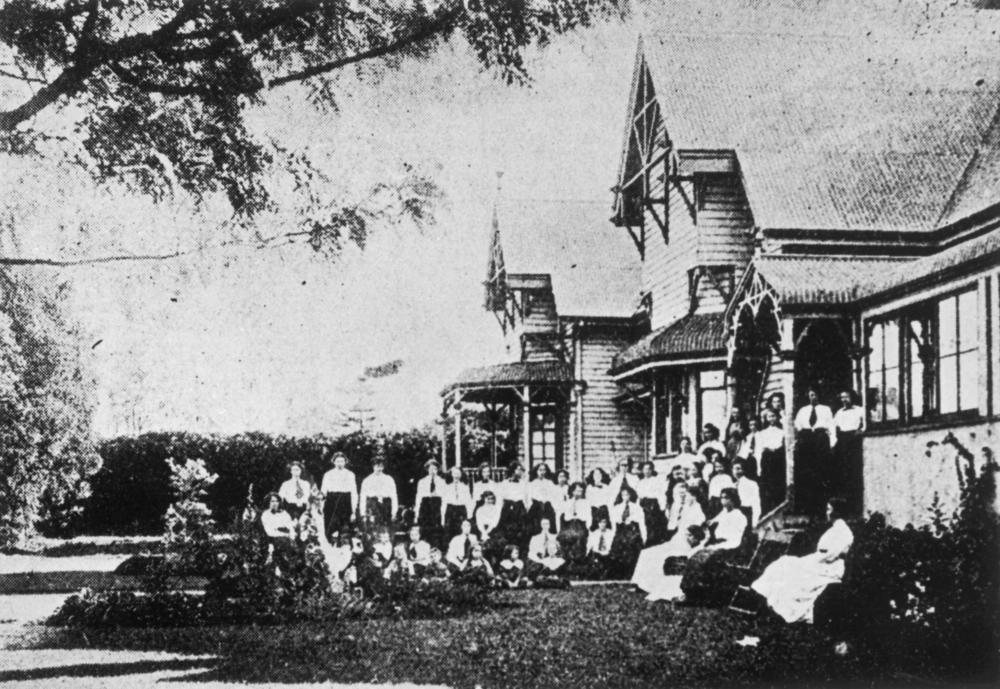
Pupils and staff of Spreydon Girls' College, ca. 1914

Nothing further is known of the occupants of the house until 1908. In 1907 sisters Elizabeth, Jessie and Margaret Thomson of Melbourne moved to Toowoomba, with the idea of establishing a girls' school conducted according to the standards of the Secondary Teachers' Association of Victoria. From its inception in the mid-19th century, Toowoomba had developed as a provincial education centre for southern Queensland, the first girls' school opening there in 1860. At Toowoomba, the Thomsons leased the Filshie house at the corner of Warra and Rome Streets, along with over an acre of land, and on 4 February 1908 opened the place as Spreydon Girls' College, a boarding and day school. The school offered classes from kindergarten to "Sydney Senior Standard". Elizabeth and Jessie Thomson were joint principals, and Margaret was responsible for boarders. The building housed the principals' and boarders' quarters, while a school room, kindergarten and tennis court were established facing Rome Street. Later the house was used for administration, dining and teaching.

The Thomsons sought the patronage of the Presbyterian Church in Brisbane, which was granted in May 1909. Steady growth in numbers necessitated new dormitories being erected early in 1911, with the school's boarding population nearing 16 out of the 60 pupils enrolled.

At Spreydon Girls' College the Thomson sisters established a school conducted on the lines of the Melbourne Presbyterian Ladies' College, with all teachers being specialists, students achieving high academic standards, and girls active in sporting interests and displaying the good manners and Christian standards insisted on by the Misses Thomson. At the end of 1914, however, financial difficulties forced the Thomson sisters to give notice of their intention to resign and return to Melbourne, prompting the Convenor of the Presbyterian Church in Queensland, the Rev. James Gibson, to give an undertaking that the Church would take full responsibility for the running of the school. A private company, The Presbyterian Ladies' College Limited, was established and the name of the school was changed to The Presbyterian Ladies' College, Toowoomba, which opened in January 1915.

Although school enrolments initially declined after the departure of the Thomson sisters the college directors negotiated a new ten-year lease with the owner of the property, Janet Filshie. While the new principal, Miss Amy Carson, faced difficulties such as drought, war and epidemics of influenza and whooping cough, the school grew rapidly in popularity and soon required a larger site. A new property, Fairholme, was acquired on the east side of Toowoomba, and a branch school was opened there in July 1917, under the full control of the Presbyterian Church (now known as Fairholme College). The remainder of the students and some of the Spreydon College buildings had been moved to Fairholme by the beginning of the 1918 school year. Miss Filshie, however, refused to cancel the 10-year lease on the Warra Street property, insisting on receipt of her monthly payments of £8/6/8 until the lease expired in December 1925.

Following Janet Filshie's death in January 1922 her property passed to trustees with the power of sale, who seem to have been responsible for converting the former girls' school into two detached houses, moving the southern gabled third of the building onto that part of the property which faced Rome Street (30 Rome Street) about 1923. This section contained two rooms under the gable, and an adjoining small front room, vestibule and hallway. Once shifted to face Rome Street, extensions, comprising two rooms and western and rear verandahs, were made on the western side of the hallway. The remaining two-thirds of the building still faced Warra Street, and was named Oak Lodge, apparently inspired by a large silky oak tree on the property.

During 1923 William Cattanach moved into Oak Lodge in May and Mrs Martha Hogg and Misses Jessie and Jean Hogg occupied 30 Rome Street in September. Oak Lodge was valued at £1,300 and both properties were subject to the Presbyterian Church lease until 19 December 1925.

=== Spreydon ===
Title to 30 Rome Street (Spreydon) on 1 rood 15.5 perches (1,400 m^{2}) was transferred in October 1924 to William and Richard Hogg of Greenmount, who paid £800 for the property, which was still subject to the lease to the Presbyterian Church. It remained in the Hogg family until title was transferred in 1970 to Dr and Mrs James Syme, who refurbished the house and named it Spreydon. Since 1987 the house has had a number of owners. Verandahs have been enclosed and converted into rooms, including an ensuite bathroom off the main bedroom. The kitchen has been refurbished including walling in the door and fanlight into the hallway and extending the kitchen space to the back wall. A recent addition is a rear deck. Other additions include a skylight on the back verandah side of the hallway, and two rooms, each with a dormer window, created in the roof space in 2001.

=== Oak Lodge ===
Title to 7 Warra Street (Oak Lodge) on 1 rood 31.7 perches (1,810 m^{2}) was transferred in May 1925 to Charlotte Cattanach, wife of William Cattanach, still subject to the lease to the Presbyterian Church. Dentist John Erskin Brown MacLean and his wife Laura acquired title to the house in October 1925 and it remained their family home until 1947. There have been a number of owners of Oak Lodge since.

A Toowoomba Chronicle article of 12 September 1973 stated that Oak Lodge was about 35 squares, still retained beautiful cedar woodwork, three fireplaces and 13-foot (4.0 m) high ceilings enhanced by solid timber cornices. The large living room, over 21 feet (6.4 m) long, featured fine timber panelling which had no exposed joins. The wide verandahs facing Warra and Rome Streets had been closed in, and the original commodious pantry formed part of the modernised kitchen.

Another article published in The Chronicle of 5 December 1998 described Oak Lodge as a residence of imposing grandeur, the formal living room featuring fireplace and bay window with window seat and horizontal wall panels that extended its entire length. Either side of the main entrance were large bedrooms with VJ walls. The dining room opened to the kitchen while step-through windows led to the enclosed side verandah. The plethora of windows allowed ventilation and sunlight to shine on the polished pine floors.

Conservation architect David Roessler described Oak Lodge in 1999. He noted that when part of the house was removed it was carefully done and is not easily noticed. Having generous main rooms, the front gable-roof room was long ago divided into two. The hall and front rooms all feature timber wainscotting and deep cornices, architraves and skirting boards, while all mouldings are of timber and unusually large. The two front bay windows have timber-panelled ceilings and recesses. He particularly noted the impressive timber portal just inside the front door, reminiscent of a Greek temple with its classical entablature with rectangular pilasters and pediment. All of the three timber framed fireplaces are less elaborate than would be expected and all were painted. The building was renovated in 2000.

Oak Lodge was identified in the 1995 Toowoomba Inner Residential Area Heritage Study as a place of special consideration and the Rome and Warra Street precinct was included in the list of places and areas valued by the community.

== Description ==
=== Oak Lodge ===
Oak Lodge is a substantial, single storeyed timber dwelling designed in a picturesque style, located on a large block at the corner of Warra and Rome Streets, Newtown, a suburb of Toowoomba.

The dwelling is asymmetrical in form, with a steeply pitched roof, from which wide gables project on the main elevation and on the eastern side of the building. A corner bay window is carried through into the main roof and is expressed as a chamfered hip. Two tall brick chimneys protrude through the corrugated iron roof and the main section of the roof is capped with cast-iron ridge decoration. A short set of unbalustraded stairs leads to a wide verandah that wraps around to the northern elevation. The verandah is edged with a three-rail dowel balustrade and has a bullnose roof stepped-down from the main roof. The verandah porch is decorated with angular timber members in a pattern of triangles. This stick-style detailing is repeated on the main gable, which is decorated with an angular pattern of timbers which are held by brackets from the gable and barge boards. Under the gable is a bay window with a curved awning which is supported on large decorative timber brackets.

The mature silky oak tree (Grevillea robusta) from which the house derives its name still dominates the front corner, while mature and recent plantings around the house add to its streetscape contribution.

=== Spreydon ===
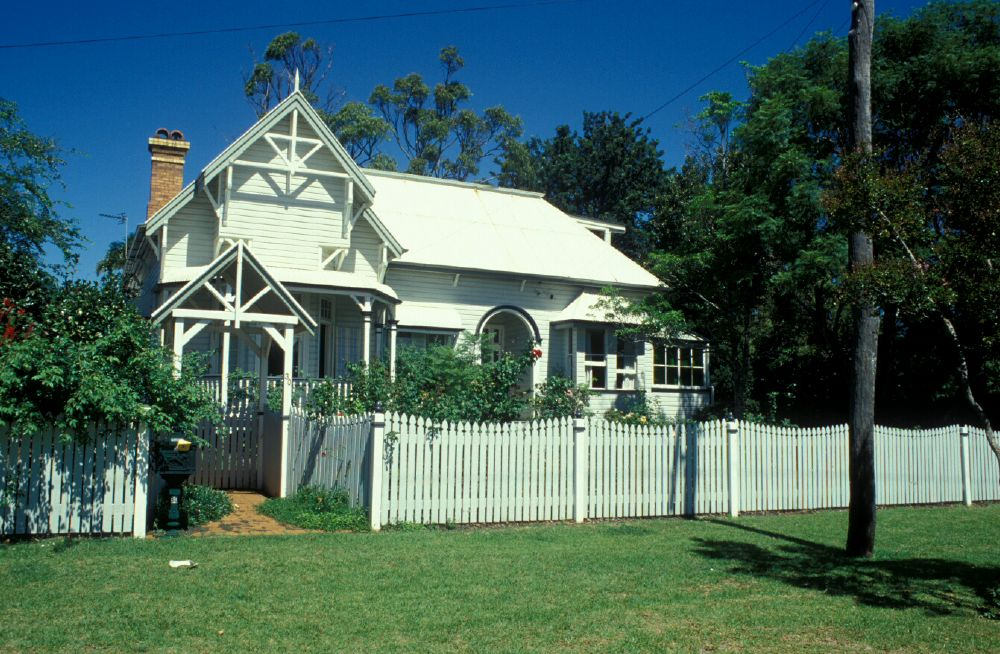
Spreydon

Spreydon is a low-set, single-storeyed timber dwelling facing north on a large block in Rome Street, Newtown, adjacent to but around the corner from, Oak Lodge.

The dwelling is asymmetrical in plan and form with a wide gable to the front and back projecting from a high-pitched roof. Single fretwork brackets support the roof either side on the front gable and eastern elevation. Above a bay in the front gable a rectangular box rises, decorated with timber stick infill. The bay has windows and doors opening onto a narrow bullnosed-roofed verandah which follows the shape of the bay. The skillion-roofed side and back verandahs are stepped down from the main roof and are enclosed with narrow weatherboards and glazing.

Either side of the front entrance porch are windows. That on the east is an 1890s double hung sash window with convex roof supported by fretwork brackets. The window on the west is a 1920s style rectangular bay window with hipped roof. Wide steps lead to the arched porch and recessed front door. Sidelights and fanlights frame the low-waisted four-panel front door.

The front door opens into a passageway one room deep, from which, on the right, a door opens into a small front 1920s room. At the end of the passageway a door on the left opens into an arched, internal vestibule from which doors open to the large 1890s front room on the left, to the adjoining 1890s front bedroom on the north side of the vestibule, to the back verandah, and to a large 1920s room on the right. Dividing this space is a solid timber archway with central pendant. On the rear verandah side there is a skylight.

Internally all walls are lined in timber boarding, with the most complex timber detailing being found in the front gabled room (1890s construction). Moulding above the dado, and framing the fireplace, door and windows, is intricate as are the deep cornices. The cedar corner fireplace has tiles surrounding the iron cob. The box-like bay window, which opens onto a small verandah, has two hinged doors either side of a central window and is surmounted by fanlights.

The 1890s vertically jointed timber tongue-and-groove walls of the passageway and vestibule have a moulded belt rail and cornice that is repeated in the small front bedroom while the southern wall contains French doors with timber and glass panels on either side delineated by a chamfered doorframe. The eastern and northern 1920s walls have no mouldings. The 1920s long back bedroom has been converted into a stairwell and smaller bedroom with the roof space made over into an attic by the insertion of two rooms, both of which have new dormer windows.

The kitchen is located at the southern end of the 1890s gabled section, and shares a corner chimney with the main front room. It has an eastern facing casement window. The original door from the kitchen to the vestibule has been closed in with the same moulded belt rail as the rest of the wall. The core of the kitchen has the 13-foot (4.0 m) ceilings found throughout the house. However, modifications have created two changes of ceiling pitch. The kitchen and skillion roof rear verandah stretches from the kitchen to a western room. This long room is an informal area with doors to the back verandah and laundry. Both the kitchen and back verandah open onto a rear timber deck.

The front yard has a painted picket fence with recessed gabled gateway, from which a path leads to the front door. At the Warra Street end a short drive leads to a later gable-roofed double carport near the back of the house. Behind this is a detached office and to the side is the large back garden.

== Heritage listing ==
Oak Lodge and Spreydon was listed on the Queensland Heritage Register on 1 October 2003 having satisfied the following criteria.

The place is important in demonstrating the evolution or pattern of Queensland's history.

Oak Lodge and Spreydon were erected in the 1890s as a single residence, commissioned by successful Toowoomba businessman Robert Walker Filshie and designed either by his partner in the Toowoomba timber merchandising firm of Filshie Broadfoot & Co., architect James Marks, or by the firm of James Marks and Son. About 1923 the large building was converted into two detached residences on adjoining allotments. As a place, Oak Lodge and Spreydon survive as evidence of the growth and residential expansion of Toowoomba, an important regional centre, in the late 19th and early 20th centuries.

The place is important in demonstrating the principal characteristics of a particular class of cultural places.

They are important in demonstrating the principal characteristics of a particular class of building: a large, well designed and carefully detailed, 1890s timber residence located in a late 19th century subdivision which attracted middle-class residents.

It is one of a number of extant buildings designed by the Marks family, who contributed significantly to the architectural character of Toowoomba and region. The same detailing is evident in the earliest section of Spreydon.

The place is important because of its aesthetic significance.

Oak Lodge is a picturesquely articulated and finely detailed timber building, and with its mature plantings it makes a substantial aesthetic contribution to the streetscape.

The place has a strong or special association with a particular community or cultural group for social, cultural or spiritual reasons.

Oak Lodge and Spreydon are valued by the community for their aesthetic streetscape contribution since the 1890s and for their association with prominent Toowoomba architects James and Harry Marks, the Filshie family, and Fairholme College.

The place has a special association with the life or work of a particular person, group or organisation of importance in Queensland's history.

Because of its size and prestigious location, the home was used during the 1910s as Spreydon Girls' College and The Presbyterian Ladies' College, Toowoomba, and the place is important for this association with the foundation of Fairholme College, an important Queensland school
