= Gladstone House and Cottage =

- Location within Queensland Location within Australia
- 27.5447°S 151.9406°E
- Location: 1B–3 Gladstone Street, Newtown, Toowoomba, Toowoomba Region, Queensland, Australia

History
- Design period: 1900–1914 (early 20th century)
- Built: c. 1908
- Built for: Henry James (Harry) Marks

Site notes
- Architect: Henry James (Harry) Marks

Queensland Heritage Register
- Official name: Gladstone House and Cottage, St Rest
- Type: state heritage (built, landscape)
- Designated: 13 January 1995
- Reference no.: 601303
- Significant period: 1900s (fabric, historical)
- Significant components: shed – storage, trees/plantings, furniture/fittings, clerestory, residential accommodation – main house, residential accommodation – gatehouse/lodge, garden/grounds

Gladstone House and Cottage is a heritage-listed detached house at 1B–3 Gladstone Street, Newtown, Toowoomba, Toowoomba Region, Queensland, Australia. It was designed by Harry Marks for himself and built c. 1908. It is also known as St Rest. It was added to the Queensland Heritage Register on 13 January 1995.

== History ==
This single storeyed timber house, also referred to as St Rest, was completed c. 1908, for prominent Toowoomba architect, Henry James (Harry) Marks. The Cottage, known also as the former Gate-keeper's Cottage, was probably erected at around this time.

Gladstone House is situated on part of Portion 86, originally an area of 93 acres (38 ha) northwest of the central business district of Toowoomba, located in the former Gowrie Shire. Portion 86, acquired by John Shipman, was one of a number of allotments ranging in size from 22–133 acres (54 ha) on the western side of Toowoomba, which were auctioned in February 1858. The sale of these lots was one of a series of land sales at Toowoomba from 1849, and the success of these early sales provided the stimulus for the development of Toowoomba as the principal town of the district.

Shipman's land was known as Eton Farm, described as the best cultivated farm in the district, on which he grew wheat, oats, barley, lucerne and corn. Shipman also established an orchard, a vegetable garden, a dairy, piggery, stockyards, and a small horse stud on his farm.

Shipman died in 1862, and his land was subdivided during the late 1880s. Thomas Jones acquired 90 acres (36 ha) of Portion 86 early in 1889. Jones further subdivided the land into two parts, one of which was transferred to Mrs Ada McDougall, a Toowoomba widow, later in 1889. Mrs McDougall took out several mortgages on the land, before it was acquired by George Wonderley, a Toowoomba solicitor, in 1898.

During the late 1880s and early 1890s, the residential area of Toowoomba rapidly expanded, as large holdings in the smaller shires surrounding Toowoomba were subdivided for residential allotments.

Wonderley commenced the subdivision and sale of the newly created blocks from early 1899. William Robinson acquired six of these blocks, comprising three acres in 1900. Between 1903–1904, Harry Marks and his wife Katharine acquired four adjoining allotments on the west corner of Gladstone and Jellicoe streets (subs 31–34), and three allotments on the opposite corner of Gladstone Street (subs 63–65). The Marks' sold subs 63–65 in 1907.

Born and trained in Toowoomba, Harry Marks had entered into partnership with his father James, in 1892. James had commenced practice as an architect in Toowoomba by the early 1880s, and he and Harry have been described as dominating the architectural profession for more than half a century. Although Harry Marks was responsible for designing a number of buildings on both the Darling Downs and in Brisbane, much of his work was in Toowoomba where he designed a variety of buildings including Rodway, St James Parish Hall, St Luke's Church Hall, additions to the Toowoomba Maltings, and the Darling Downs Co-operative Bacon Factory. Marks was also described as being gifted with inventive genius, and he devised and patented a number of architectural elements, including roof ventilators, windows and a method of stucco wall construction.

Marks incorporated examples of his inventions in the design of St Rest, triangular bay windows and the AUSTRAL window which he designed reputedly for the house.

The Town of Newtown was formed in 1913, from part of the Gowrie Shire area. Marks was an alderman on the Newtown Town Council from 1913 until 1917, when it was absorbed into the Toowoomba City area.

Following Marks' death in 1939, Katharine remained at Gladstone House and commenced subdividing the grounds of Gladstone House during the 1940s. The land on which the Cottage stands was transferred to Marks' daughter KM Muir, in 1951. Katharine died in 1954, and her son Charles Beresford Marks, also a Toowoomba architect, was appointed trustee of the property.

Gladstone House was acquired by Theodore and Doris Hallop in 1955, and the property has since changed hands a number of times. Alterations undertaken to Gladstone House during the 1970s included the addition of a room at the rear of the house. Gladstone House was sold again in 1990.

== Description ==
The property consists of Gladstone House, the Cottage and associated grounds.

=== Gladstone House ===
Gladstone House, a single-storeyed weatherboard residence with a multi-hipped corrugated iron roof and timber stumps with batten infill, is located on a northerly sloping site fronting Gladstone Street to the east. The building has a 1970s split-level addition at the rear.

The strong geometry of the building is reflected in the cruciform plan, consisting of a central octagonal living room with three bedrooms projecting to the northwest, northeast and southeast, and a dining room to the southwest. The inside corner of each projecting wing is infilled with a triangular shaped room, with the main entry to the east, bathroom to the south, bedroom to the north, and originally an open deck to the west which has been enclosed and extended to create a kitchen. The 1970s split-level addition is attached to the west of the kitchen.

Each projecting wing has a hipped roof with finial, the infill rooms have skillion roofs, and the central octagonal room has hipped dormer skylights to the north, east and south, and a central look-out which was originally accessed via a western stair which is no longer extant. The skylights have centrally pivoted hopper widows, and a pot-bellied rendered chimney stack is located above the southwest wing.

The east entry has a central octagonal hipped corrugated iron roofed turret, surrounded by a skillion roofed verandah. The verandah has diagonally patterned timber balustrading, chamfered timber posts and a batten valance, and is accessed via a concrete platform and steps with steel handrails and diagonally patterned balustrade. The entry door is to the side of a central projecting bay, which has a patented Marks' AUSTRAL window, and is flanked by the same to either side.

The eastern projecting wings, and northern infill bedroom, have projecting triangular bay units with sash windows and skillion awnings. The upper section of the walls, between window heads and eaves, is finished with hardboard sheeting with spaced vertical battens giving a horizontal band around the building and separating the higher and lower gutter lines. The southern bathroom has a patented Marks' AUSTRAL window, and the dining room has twin sashes. Internally, the building has timber skirtings and cornices, with vertically jointed boarding to walls to all rooms, except the central octagonal room which has horizontal boarding to the fanlight head height and vertical boarding above. Ceilings are boarded, with the central room having skylights located above the ceiling line forming angled recesses. This room has timber doors with glass panes and glass fanlights located below the north and east skylights, and a fireplace located on the southwest wall with an ornate timber surround with tiled inserts and a boarded chimney stack with timber mantle. A doorway has been inserted to the west of the chimney, and accesses the southwest dining room which may have been the original kitchen. This room has a concrete slab which may have been the hearth of a fireplace backing onto the existing living room fireplace.

The corners of the triangular infill rooms are squared-off to create small cupboards which are accessed from the adjoining projecting wing rooms. The bathroom has been recently refitted, and the rear kitchen area has undergone a number of alterations and currently links into the 1970s addition and opens onto a deck on the northwest.

=== The Cottage ===
The Cottage, now a separate residence, is located at the northeast corner of the northerly sloping site fronting Gladstone Street to the east. This single-storeyed weatherboard structure with a multi-hipped corrugated iron roof with a tall central clerestory skylight, has timber stumps with batten infill, curved timber eave brackets, and sash and casement windows with timber batten brackets and corrugated iron hoods.

The building is symmetrical to Gladstone Street, and has an entrance porch at either corner with the main entry being at the northeast and accessed via a timber stair with metal handrail. A small verandah has been enclosed on the northeast corner, which was formerly a rear entry, and a lean-to laundry has been attached at the rear.

Internally, the building consists of a central living room dominated by a clerestory skylight, with a bedroom to either side and a kitchen and bathroom at the rear. Ceilings are of hardboard sheeting with timber coverstrips, walls have vertically jointed boarding, doors have timber frames with glass panel inserts and ventilation strips above, and the kitchen has early cabinets and fittings.

=== Grounds ===
A driveway accesses the property to the north of Gladstone House, and leads to a recent brick garage built adjacent to the house at the northwest. A chamferboard shed with a corrugated iron skillion roof and timber doors is located to the northwest of the house, and the site contains a number of mature trees, including a large tree to the southwest of Gladstone House.

== Heritage listing ==
Gladstone House and Cottage was listed on the Queensland Heritage Register on 13 January 1995 having satisfied the following criteria.

The place is important in demonstrating the evolution or pattern of Queensland's history.

Erected in the early 20th century, in a then outer part of Toowoomba (previously Gowrie Shire), Gladstone House survives as evidence of the growth and residential expansion of Toowoomba from this time, as formerly large estates and farms were subdivided and sold.

The place is important in demonstrating the principal characteristics of a particular class of cultural places.

Designed by prominent Toowoomba architect HJ Marks as his private residence, Gladstone House and Cottage, erected c. 1908, display an individual inventiveness and creativity typical of Marks' work in their design. Gladstone House includes examples of the AUSTRAL window designed and patented by Marks. The buildings possess highly articulated geometry in plan, elevation and roof form, containing many design elements associated with Marks' work, and reflecting many of his design considerations including the use of natural light and ventilation.

The place is important because of its aesthetic significance.

Gladstone House, the Cottage and the surrounding plantings make a substantial aesthetic contribution to the streetscape of Gladstone Street, and complement the considerable range of extant HJ Marks buildings in Toowoomba.

The place is important in demonstrating a high degree of creative or technical achievement at a particular period.

Designed by prominent Toowoomba architect HJ Marks as his private residence, Gladstone House and Cottage, erected c. 1908, display an individual inventiveness and creativity typical of Marks' work in their design. Gladstone House includes examples of the AUSTRAL window designed and patented by Marks. The buildings possess highly articulated geometry in plan, elevation and roof form, containing many design elements associated with Marks' work, and reflecting many of his design considerations including the use of natural light and ventilation.

The place has a special association with the life or work of a particular person, group or organisation of importance in Queensland's history.

Designed by prominent Toowoomba architect HJ Marks as his private residence, Gladstone House and Cottage, erected c. 1908, display an individual inventiveness and creativity typical of Marks' work in their design. Gladstone House includes examples of the AUSTRAL window designed and patented by Marks. The buildings possess highly articulated geometry in plan, elevation and roof form, containing many design elements associated with Marks' work, and reflecting many of his design considerations including the use of natural light and ventilation.
