= Smithfield House =

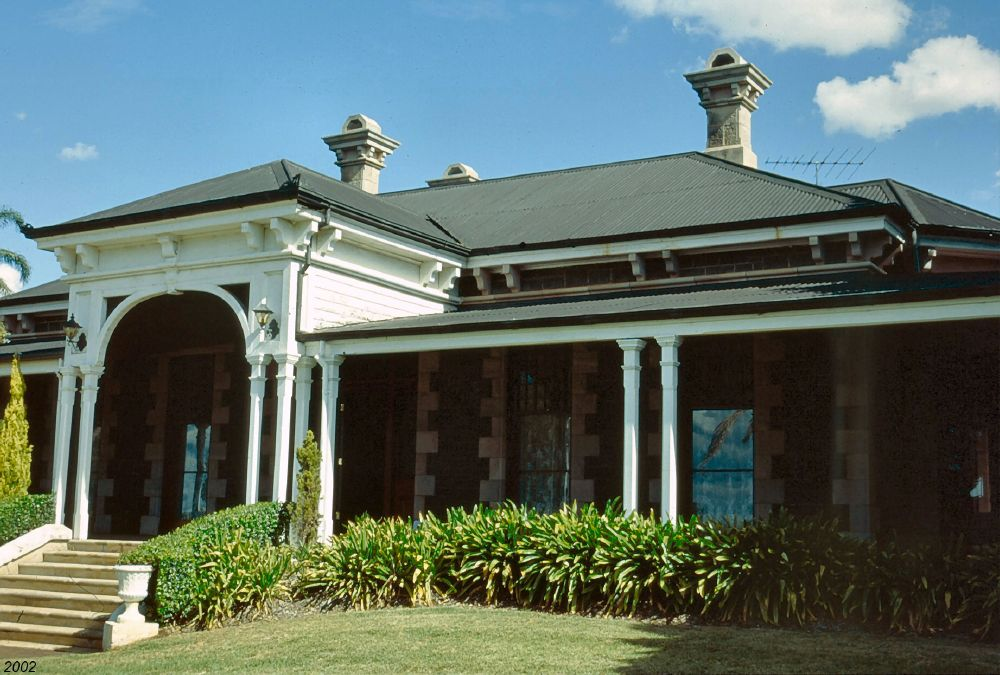
- Smithfield House, 2002

- Location within Queensland Location within Australia
- 27.5855°S 151.929°E
- Location: 8 Panda Street, Harristown, Toowoomba, Toowoomba Region, Queensland, Australia

History
- Design period: 1870s–1890s (late 19th century)
- Built: c. 1895–

Site notes
- Architect: James Marks and Son

Queensland Heritage Register
- Official name: Smithfield House
- Type: state heritage (landscape, built)
- Designated: 21 October 1992
- Reference no.: 600854
- Significant period: 1890s (fabric, historical)
- Significant components: garden/grounds, steps/stairway, residential accommodation – main house

Smithfield House is a heritage-listed villa at 8 Panda Street, Harristown, Toowoomba, Toowoomba Region, Queensland, Australia. It was designed by architectural firm James Marks and Son and built from c. 1895 onwards. It was added to the Queensland Heritage Register on 21 October 1992.

== History ==
Smithfield House was designed by James Marks & Son in 1895 for James Taylor, a wealthy Darling Downs landowner. The contractor was Sydney (Harry) Andrews.

Taylor is considered to have been the driving force behind Toowoomba's development, as he invested heavily in land in Toowoomba particularly during late 1850s. He took a leading role in encouraging the social, cultural and economic development of Toowoomba, donating land to various groups and churches, and he became known as "the King of Toowoomba". Taylor was Mayor of Toowoomba in 1890 and was a Member of Parliament between 1860 and 1893. Smithfield was the third house built by Taylor. It was built on a 300-acre section of land on the southern side of the Toowoomba border, at the edge of the township of Drayton. Taylor planted and tended a fine stand of trees flanking the long carriageway, which, it has been suggested, have been preserved in parkland across from the homestead, though this has yet to be determined.

James Marks was one of the most influential architects in Toowoomba from the late 1860s to the early twentieth century. He and his son Harry Marks with whom he entered into partnership in 1892 came to dominate the architectural profession in the Darling Downs for more than half a century. James Marks' own works include St Patrick's Roman Catholic Cathedral in James St, Toowoomba and St Matthew's Anglican Church in Drayton. Smithfield House was designed under James Marks & Son whose works also include the Bandstand in Toowoomba Botanical Gardens, Ascot House in Toowoomba and Vacy Hall c. 1900. James and Harry Marks have left a significant visible legacy in the buildings of Toowoomba of which Smithfield House is an important example.

James Taylor never lived in Smithfield house; he stayed at Clifford House. Smithfield's first occupant, ca. 1907, was Oscar Flemmich. Flemmich has been described as both a German industrialist and an Austrian nobleman. He built extensive stables on the grounds, but left Smithfield during World War I. His reasons for leaving have been attributed to pressure from anti-German communities in the area.

Part of the Taylor estate was sold to Darcy Winton, a Charleville grazier in 1908, and during the Second World War, the house was used as part of a private school. It was sold to the Anglican Church to house the Glennie Memorial School until 1962. Between 1962 and 1966 the property was leased by the Minter family from the Church of England

In 1966 it was sold for sub-division and during this time suffered a period of decay and attacks by vandals before restoration in the 1970s.

In 1974, Smithfield Homestead was bought by Barwick and Ceisolka. Initial plans to turn the property into a restaurant were objected to by Toowoomba residents, as indicted by letters to the editor in The Toowoomba Chronicle. However, any objections were unsuccessful as Smithfield Homestead was opened as a restaurant in 1975. In 1978 it was sold to Kelvin and Thelma Roche, who continued to operate Smithfield Homestead as a restaurant from 1975 until it was leased to Paul Hughes and Brian Pozzey in the early 1980s. Smithfield Homestead was one of the most popular restaurants in Toowoomba, hosting many functions including weddings and receptions.

The property was sold in 1995 and again in 2002 and 2003. In April 2017, the property was again up for sale with an asking price of $1,235,000.

== Description ==
Smithfield House is located on the corner of Panda and Cheviot Streets, Toowoomba sited on a flat parcel of land. The site is composed of well manicured gardens which constitute what remains of the historical setting of the house.

Smithfield itself is a single storey residence of stone construction. The 0.6-metre (2 ft 0 in) bluestone foundations extend 4 metres (13 ft) deep into the ground. The sandstone was transported from England and the bluestone was quarried locally. The external walls are distinguished by bluestone blocks with rusticated sandstone quoins to door and window openings. The core of the building has a complex roof structure of corrugated iron with four prominent decorated sandstone chimneys. The bracketed eaves on the main roof impart an Italianate quality to the house.

Verandahs surround the north, east and west elevations of the house and are 3.6 metres (12 ft) deep and constructed of crow's ash timber. Sandstone steps lead from the front garden to an elaborate portico which extends through the verandah at the front. Two large bay windows project onto the front verandah at the sides. These large windows consist of one multi-paned fixed upper sash and one sliding lower sash. The verandah roof is separate from that of the main house and is supported on decorative twin timber posts. The centrally located front door is framed between the two bay windows, whose forms are echoed in the main roof form. Decorative leadlight panes also surround the front door.

The front entrance leads into a wide hallway which runs the length the original house and is flanked on either side by symmetrically placed rooms. The hallway features two moulded arch archways as well as moulded cornices. The front easterly room is the main bedroom which includes a fireplace with decorative mantle and features timber inlay borders on the timber floors. Directly opposite this room is another large room used as a lounge with similar features. These rooms gain access to the front verandah via the large bay windows.

Internally the walls are finished in plaster and feature high-quality timber joinery, while the floors are of wide hardwood boards.

A recent addition has been constructed to the rear of the original house during the period it was used as a restaurant and entertainment venue in the 1970s. This rear addition is externally clad in weatherboard and is not visible from the front elevation of the house. The original rear external bluestone wall now sits internally and marks the commencement of the addition from inside the house. Internally the addition is characterised by plasterboard cladding and includes a spacious dining and entertaining area, kitchen, bathrooms and laundry.

== Heritage listing ==
Smithfield House was listed on the Queensland Heritage Register on 21 October 1992 having satisfied the following criteria.

The place is important in demonstrating the evolution or pattern of Queensland's history.

Smithfield House is reflective of the pattern of affluent settlement which occurred in Toowoomba in the late 19th century, demonstrating the transition of the Darling Downs from a sparsely populated rural district to one of prosperity and prominence. It is one of the many fine residences which reflect Toowoomba's leading position during the development of the rich Darling Downs. It is typical of a residence built for wealthy landowners in the Darling Downs during the period.

Also of historical significance is the land on which Smithfield house sits. The relatively large property located amongst small suburban blocks is reflective of the pattern of land settlement in Toowoomba prior to sub-division and close urban settlement which occurred from the mid 20th century onwards. Smithfield originally occupied 300 acres and the current lot is the remnant of this early property.

The place is important in demonstrating the principal characteristics of a particular class of cultural places.

It also demonstrates the principal characteristics of a substantial affluent domestic building of late 19th century in Queensland.

The place is important because of its aesthetic significance.

Smithfield House demonstrates significant aesthetic value as a substantial, well-composed house displaying fine workmanship and detailing. Its spacious gardens complement the house creating a sense of the balance between the substantially sized house and its surrounding environment.

The place has a special association with the life or work of a particular person, group or organisation of importance in Queensland's history.

Smithfield House has special association with the work of prominent Toowoomba architect J. Marks as well as special association with the life of James Taylor who was a prominent figure in Toowoomba's development and Mayor of Toowoomba in 1890.
