= Presbyterian Ladies' College =

Presbyterian Ladies' College (PLC) is the name of several independent girls' schools in Australia, affiliated with either the Presbyterian Church of Australia or the Uniting Church in Australia. Many of these schools are seen as sister schools to Scotch Colleges and The Scots College.

== List of schools ==
Establishments known as Presbyterian Ladies' College include:

- Presbyterian Ladies' College, Armidale, in Armidale, New South Wales
- Presbyterian Ladies' College, Goulburn, in Goulburn, New South Wales
- Presbyterian Ladies' College, Melbourne, in Burwood, Victoria
- Presbyterian Ladies' College, Perth, in Peppermint Grove, Western Australia
- Presbyterian Ladies' College, Sydney, in Croydon, New South Wales
- Presbyterian Ladies' College, Warwick, in Warwick, Queensland

Former establishments known as Presbyterian Ladies' College include:

- Arden Anglican School, in Beecroft, New South Wales (formerly the Presbyterian Ladies' College, Beecroft, a preparatory school of the Presbyterian Ladies' College, Sydney)
- Fairholme College in Toowoomba, Queensland (formerly the Presbyterian Ladies' College, Toowoomba)
  - Oak Lodge and Spreydon (the heritage-listed houses in Toowoomba formerly occupied by the Presbyterian Ladies' College, Toowoomba)
- Pymble Ladies' College, in Pymble, New South Wales (formerly the Presbyterian Ladies' College, Pymble)
- Seymour College, in Glen Osmond, South Australia (formerly Presbyterian Girls' College)

Schools formed by merging with a Presbyterian Ladies' College include:

- Ballarat and Clarendon College in Ballarat, Victoria (Clarendon Presbyterian Ladies' College)
- Kinross Wolaroi School in Orange, New South Wales (The Presbyterian Ladies' College, Orange)
- Penleigh and Essendon Grammar School in Essendon, Moonee Ponds and Keilor East, Victoria (Penleigh Presbyterian Ladies' College)
- The Scots PGC College in Warwick, Queensland (The Presbyterian Girls' College)
