= Presbyterian College (disambiguation) =

Presbyterian College can refer to:

- Presbyterian College, a private liberal arts college in Clinton, South Carolina, USA
- Presbyterian College of Education, Akropong
- The Presbyterian College, Montreal, a theological college affiliated with McGill University
- Presbyterian Ladies' College (disambiguation), several independent girls' schools in Australia
- Category:Presbyterian universities and colleges
