= Gilbert Cory =

Mayor of Toowoomba, Queensland

Gilbert Gostwyck Cory
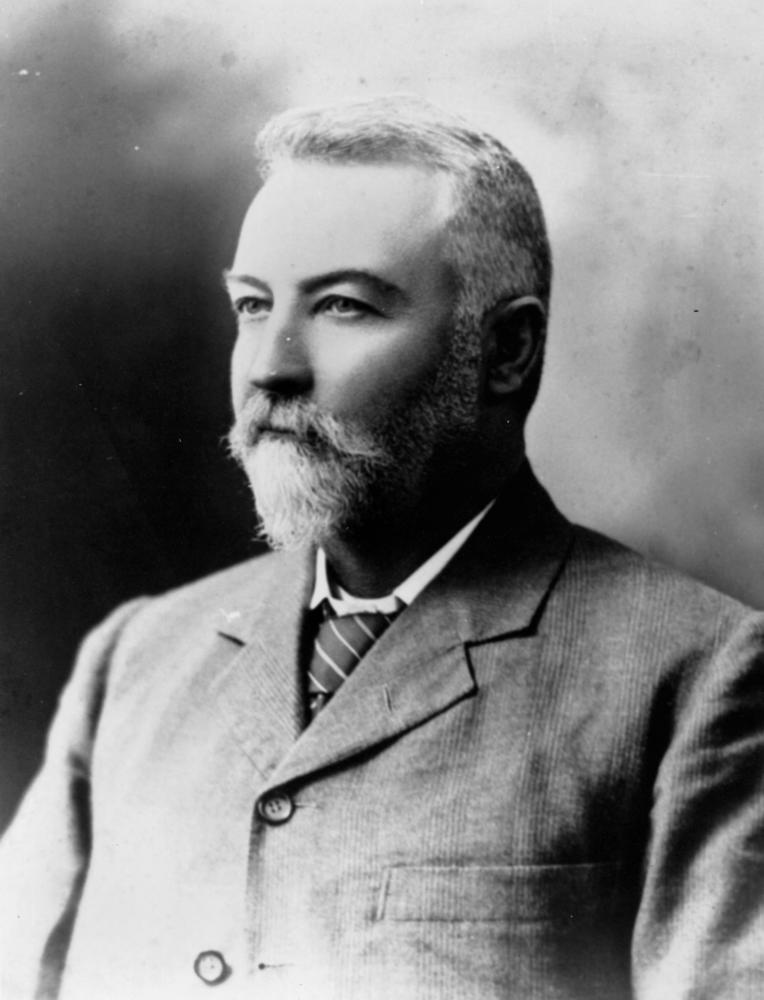
- Gilbert Cory in 1891.
- Born: 1839; Paterson, New South Wales
- Died: 8 August 1924 (aged 84–85)

Gilbert Gostwyck Cory (1839–1924) was the mayor of Toowoomba, Queensland in 1891. Born in Paterson, New South Wales in 1839 and educated at King's School .He became a station manager after moving to Toowoomba in 1858, where he worked for James Taylor, who was also mayor of Toowoomba. Aside from being mayor, Cory served as an alderman on the Toowoomba City Council from 1889 to 1894 and was also active on the Shire of Jondaryan Council, serving as chairman in 1894 and 1895 and an alderman in 1883–1919. He had one son and four daughters. He died on 8 August 1924. His former house, Vacy Hall, is now heritage-listed and used as a boutique hotel.
