= Newtown, Queensland (Toowoomba) =

Newtown
- Suburb
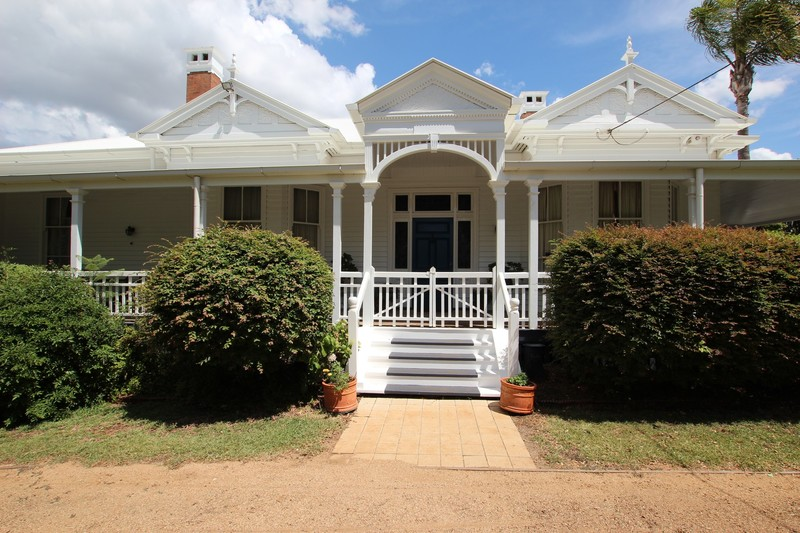
- Elphin (heritage-listed house), 2018

- Interactive map of Newtown
- Coordinates: 27.5541°S 151.93°E
- Country: Australia
- State: Queensland
- City: Toowoomba
- LGA: Toowoomba Region
- Location: 2.0 km (1.2 mi) W of Toowoomba CBD; 129 km (80 mi) W of Brisbane

Government
  - State electorates: Toowoomba North; Toowoomba South
  - Federal division: Groom

Area
  - Total: 5.5 km^{2} (2.1 sq mi)

Population
  - Total: 10,039 (2021 census)
  - Density: 1,825/km^{2} (4,730/sq mi)
- Time zone: UTC+10:00 (AEST)
- Postcode: 4350
Suburbs around Newtown
| Wilsonton | Rockville | Harlaxton; North Toowoomba |
| Glenvale | Newtown | Toowoomba City |
| Harristown | Harristown | South Toowoomba |

Newtown is a residential locality in Toowoomba in the Toowoomba Region, Queensland, Australia. In the 2021 census, Newtown had a population of 10,039 people.

== Geography ==
Newtown is located immediately west of the Toowoomba city centre.

The eastern end of the Gore Highway starts at an intersection with the Warrego Highway in Newtown.

== History ==
The area was the first outside the city centre to be subdivided for residential purposes in 1865.

On 26 February 1899, the foundation stone for St Mary's College was laid by the Roman Catholic Archbishop of Brisbane Robert Dunne. The school opened on 2 October 1899 with 120 students. It was operated by the Christian Brothers until 1997 when the first lay principal was appointed.

Spreydon College commenced on 4 February 1908 in the now-heritage listed Spreydon house. Under the patronage of the Presbyterian Church, the school became The Presbyterian Ladies' College in January 1915. The primary school moved to the house Fairholme in East Toowoomba in July 1917 with the secondary school following in 1918; it is now known as Fairholme College.

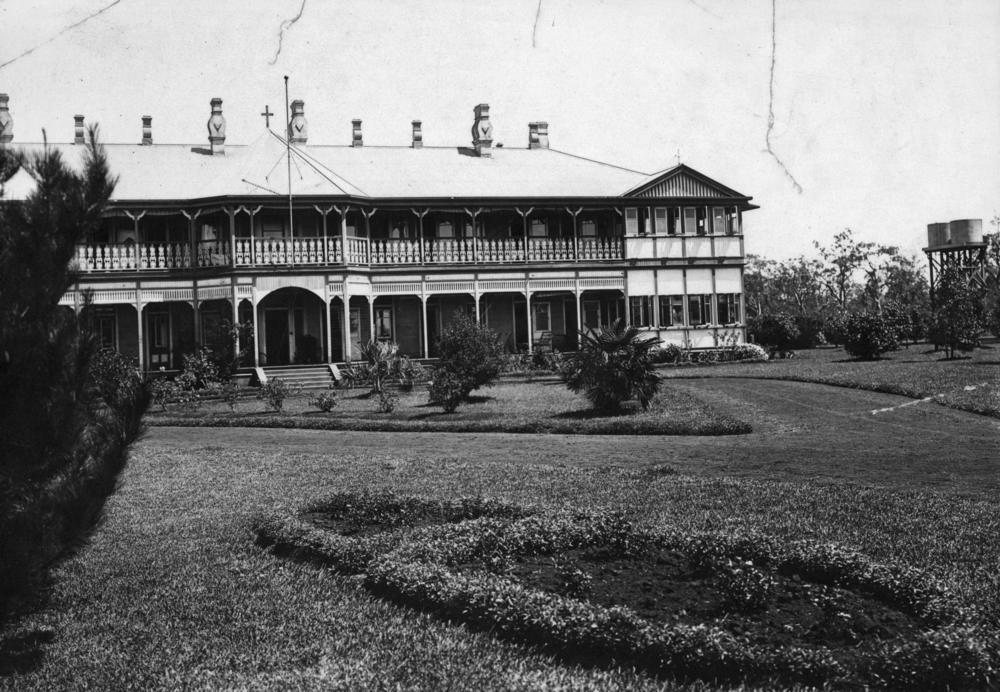
Circular drive in front of Glennie Memorial School, circa 1925

Glennie Memorial School was opened on 27 August 1908 by the Anglican Church. Establishing schools had been a long-term ambition of Benjamin Glennie, the first Anglican priest on the Darling Downs, and he had raised funds for this purpose for many years, but had not achieved his aim before his death in 1900. Glennie was highly respected by the community and the Anglican Synod continued with his fund raising campaign to establish a school to be named in his honour. The school was subsequently renamed The Glennie School.

The Newtown Methodist Church opened in 1911 at 202 Russell Street (27.5566°S 151.9352°E). With the amalgamation of the Methodist Church into the Uniting Church in Australia in 1977, it became the Newtown Uniting Church.The property was sold in December 2013 for $748,000 as part of an amalgamation of three Uniting Church congregations (Newtown, Scots and Westbrook) into the Lifeworks Uniting Church congregation, which opened its first church in Glenvale circa July 2017. The former Newtown Methodist Church is now a childcare centre.

From 1913 to 1917, Newtown had its own local government, the Town of Newtown.

Newtown State School opened on 6 October 1924.

St Ursula's College was established on 2 February 1931 by the Sisters of St Ursula.

The foundation stone for Our Lady of Lourdes Catholic Primary School was laid on Sunday 26 November 1939 by Roman Catholic Bishop of Toowoomba Joseph Roper. The school opened on 6 February 1940 operated by the Sisters of St Ursula.

Toowoomba West Special School opened on 4 October 1975.

Clifford Park Special School opened in 1990 in Robb Street. A second campus (the Denise Kable campus) opened at 58 Ramsay Street, Centenary Heights, in January 1998.

== Demographics ==
In the 2016 census, Newtown had a population of 9,596 people.

In the 2021 census, Newtown had a population of 10,039 people.

== Heritage listings ==
Newtown has a number of heritage-listed sites, including:

- Elphin (residence), 24 Anzac Avenue
- Gladstone House and Cottage, 1B-3 Gladstone Street
- Toowoomba Maltings, 11 Mort Street
- Ascot House, 15 Newmarket Street
- Tor, 396 Tor Street
- Weetwood, 427 Tor Street
- Oak Lodge and Spreydon, 7 Warra Street & 30 Rome Street

== Education ==
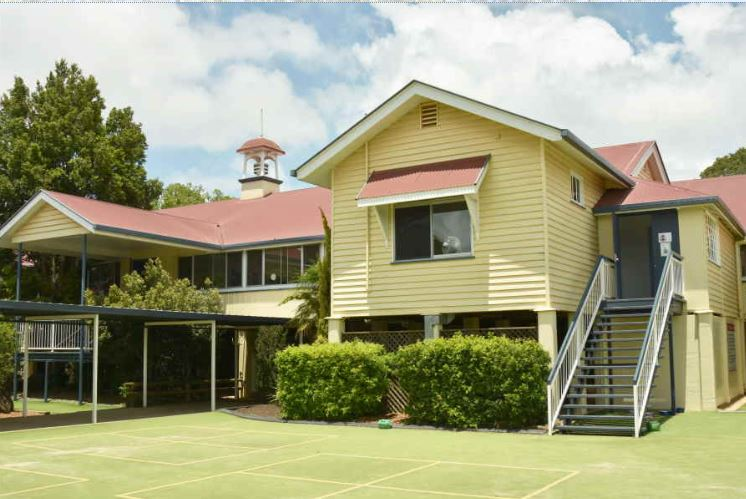
Newtown State School, 2025

Newtown State School is a government primary (Prep–6) school for boys and girls at 24 Albert Street (27.5586°S 151.9352°E). In 2017, the school had an enrolment of 409 students with 33 teachers (28 full-time equivalent) and 28 non-teaching staff (16 full-time equivalent).

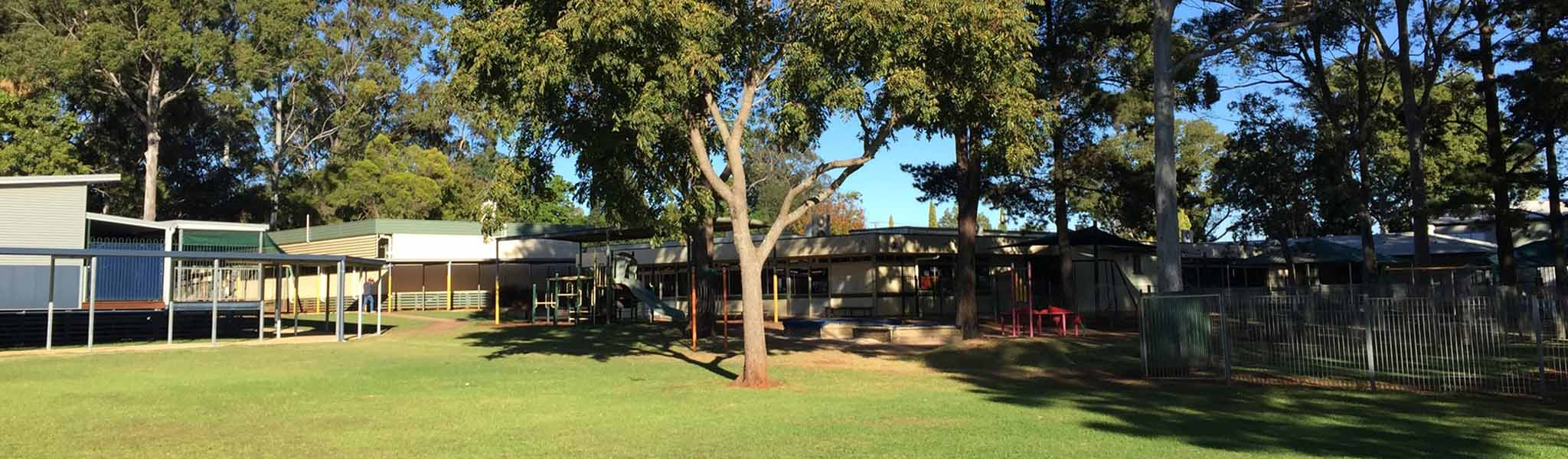
Toowoomba West Special School, 2025

Toowoomba West Special School is a special primary (Early Childhood–6) school for boys and girls at 26 Gladstone Street (27.5476°S 151.9407°E). In 2017, the school had an enrolment of 66 students with 27 teachers (22 full-time equivalent) and 41 non-teaching staff (25 full-time equivalent).

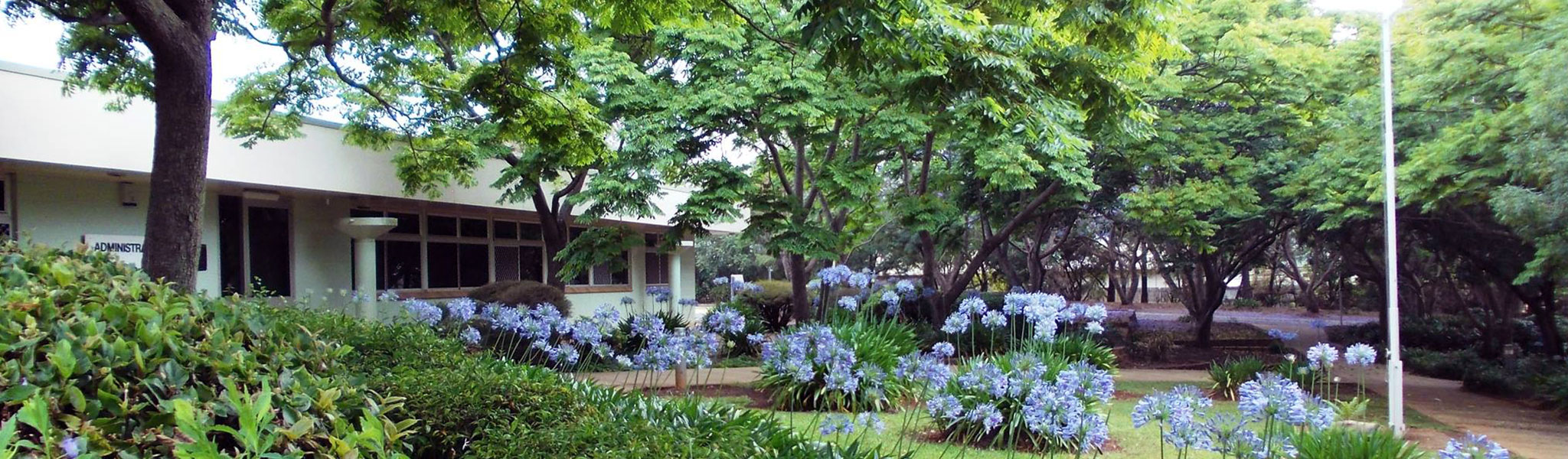
Clifford Park Special School, 2025

Clifford Park Special School is a special secondary (7–12) school for boys and girls at 19 Rob Street (27.5638°S 151.9250°E). In 2017, the school had an enrolment of 120 students with 33 teachers (28 full-time equivalent) and 51 non-teaching staff (31 full-time equivalent). The school has a second campus (the Denise Kable campus) at 58 Ramsay Street in Centenary Heights.

Our Lady of Lourdes Primary School is a Catholic primary (Prep–6) school for boys and girls at 2 Ascot Street (27.5570°S 151.9326°E). In 2017, the school had an enrolment of 378 students with 23 teachers (20 full-time equivalent) and 15 non-teaching staff (7 full-time equivalent).

St Mary's College is a Catholic primary and secondary (5–12) school for boys at 129 West Street (27.5604°S 151.9431°E). In 2017, the school had an enrolment of 820 students with 68 teachers (65 full-time equivalent) and 38 non-teaching staff (31 full-time equivalent).

St Ursula's College is a Catholic secondary (7–12) school for girls at 38 Taylor Street (27.5555°S 151.9410°E). In 2017, the school had an enrolment of 633 students with 60 teachers (58 full-time equivalent) and 40 non-teaching staff (34 full-time equivalent).

The Glennie School is a private primary and secondary (Prep–12) school for girls at 246–248 Herries Street (27.5623°S 151.9361°E). In 2017, the school had an enrolment of 783 students with 70 teachers (64 full-time equivalent) and 58 non-teaching staff (46 full-time equivalent).

There are no government secondary schools in Newtown. The nearest government secondary schools are Harristown State High School in neighbouring Harristown to the south, Wilsonton State High School in Wilsonton Heights to the north-west, and Toowoomba State High School in Mount Lofty to the north-east.

== Facilities ==
- Clifford Gardens Shopping Centre, opened in 1983 (Big W, Woolworths, Coles Supermarkets, Best & Less, Australia Post)
- Clifford Park Racecourse, home to the Toowoomba Turf Club, established in 1862.
- Pure Land Learning College Association Inc. (Buddhist, 2001)
