= St Ursula's College, Toowoomba =

Location
- Toowoomba, Queensland; Australia
- Coordinates: 27°33′22″S 151°56′29″E

Information
- Type: Independent secondary boarding and day school
- Motto: Latin: Serviam
- Religious affiliation: Catholic Diocese of Toowoomba
- Denomination: Roman Catholicism
- Established: 1931; 94 years ago
- Founder: Ursuline Sisters
- Principal: Tanya Appleby
- Years: 7–12
- Gender: Girls
- Colours: Blue, white and green
- Website: www.st-ursula.qld.edu.au

St. Ursula's College is a Catholic independent girls' secondary boarding and day school in Newtown, Toowoomba, Queensland, Australia. The school was established in 1931 by Ursuline nuns. The college is administered by the Catholic Diocese of Toowoomba.

The school is heavily influenced by the teachings of Saint Angela Merici. Many of the school's buildings are named after Italian cities and places such as Brescia and Lake Garda that were part of Merici's life. The college attracts many girls from remote locations throughout Queensland and New South Wales as boarders.

== Notable former students ==
- Charlotte Chimes (actress, known for playing Nicolette Stone in Neighbours)

== AFL Team Achievements ==
=== Senior Female (Years 10–12) ===
- Brisbane Lions State Cup

(gold) Champions: 2011
