= Clifford House, Toowoomba =

Heritage-listed house in Queensland, Australia

Clifford House
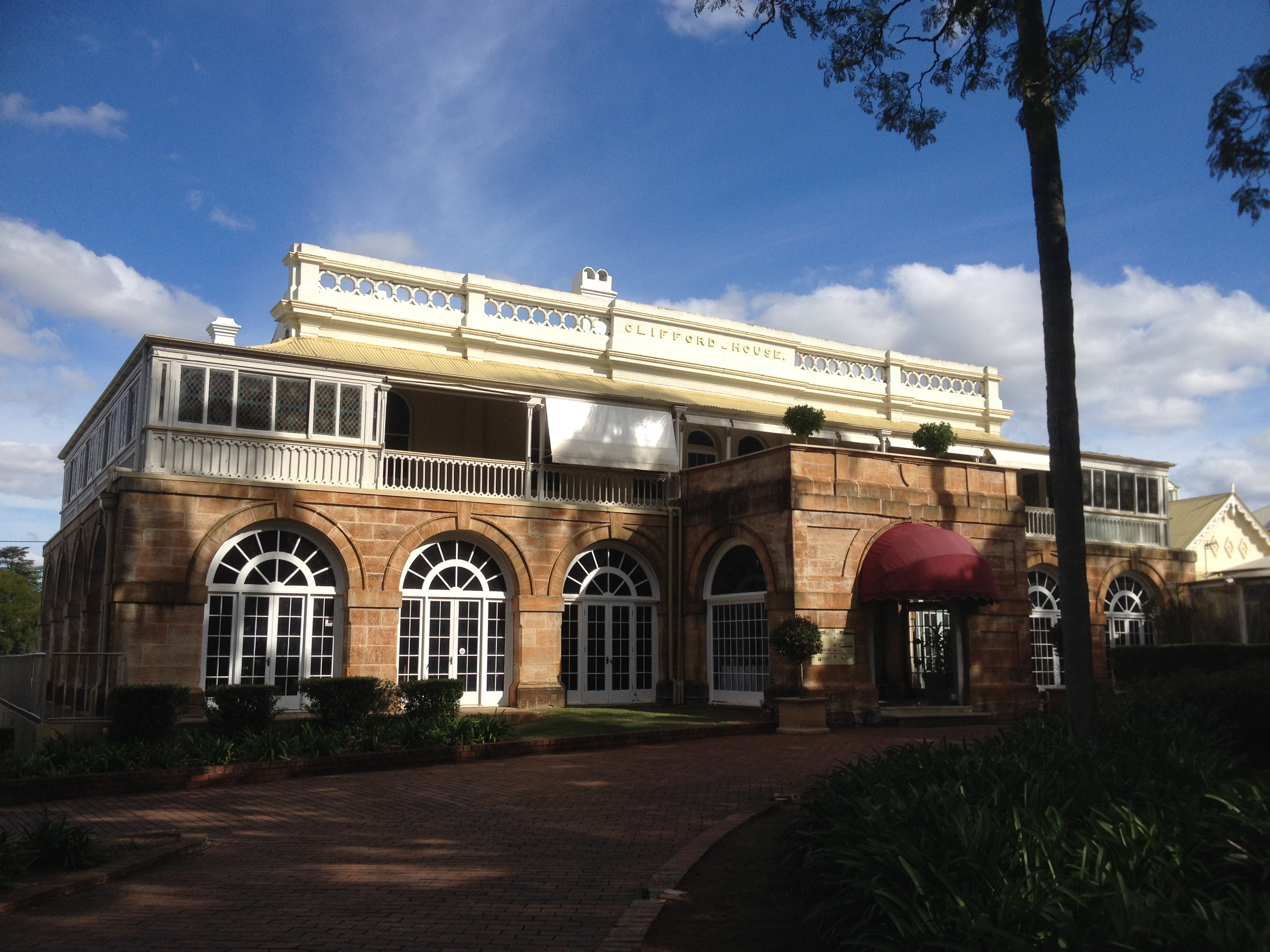
- Clifford House, Toowoomba, 2014

- Location within Queensland Location within Australia
- 27.5587°S 151.9473°E
- Location: 120 Russell Street, Toowoomba, Toowoomba Region, Queensland, Australia

History
- Design period: 1840s–1860s (mid-19th century)
- Built: c. 1865

Queensland Heritage Register
- Official name: Clifford House
- Type: state heritage (built, landscape)
- Designated: 21 October 1992
- Reference no.: 600857
- Significant period: 1860s–1880s (fabric); 1860s–1890s (historical)
- Significant components: portico, carriage way/drive, tank – water, shed – storage, billiards room, lead light/s, tower – water, lawn/s, decorative features, roof/ridge ventilator/s / fleche/s, wall/s – garden, garden/grounds, residential accommodation – main house, service wing

Clifford House, also nicknamed as St James' Palace, is a heritage-listed club house at 120 Russell Street, Toowoomba, Toowoomba Region, Queensland, Australia. It was built c. 1865. It was added to the Queensland Heritage Register on 21 October 1992.

== History ==
This two-storeyed building, intended for use as a gentlemen's club, was erected in the mid-1860s on land owned by the Hon James Taylor in Russell Street, Toowoomba.

The land on which Clifford House stands had been granted to William Horton in 1852, and was acquired by Taylor and his partner in Cecil Plains station, Henry Stuart Russell in 1855. Taylor is considered to have been the driving force behind Toowoomba's development, as he invested heavily in land in Toowoomba particularly during the late 1850s. Taylor took a leading role in encouraging the social, cultural and economic development of Toowoomba, donating land to various groups and churches, and he came to be regarded as "the King of Toowoomba". Taylor was Mayor of Toowoomba in 1890, and was a Member of Parliament between 1860 and 1893.

The first Congregational Church in Toowoomba was built on this site in 1860, when Taylor and Russell gave land to the Rev JT Waraker for building a school house and church. By 1863, the church had outgrown the Russell Street building, and a new Congregational Church was built in Margaret Street and opened in 1864. The land in Russell Street was sold back to Taylor.

In 1865, Taylor sold the land to a group of squatters (which included himself), who wished to start a club similar to the Queensland Club in Brisbane. The building appears to have been erected shortly after, however the club fell into financial difficulties, and the land and building were eventually sold back to Taylor in 1870. Francis Thomas Gregory and his family lived at the club house from 1867 until early 1870 when they moved to Harlaxton House. The building was believed to have been used as the District Surveyor's Office for a number of years prior to 1870, and it is also understood that Taylor used the club house as the Lands Office in his position as Secretary for Public Lands from January 1869 to May 1870.

In 1870, Taylor had the club house reconditioned as Clifford House, named after his father's birthplace in England. Richard Godsall, a prominent Toowoomba builder and later Mayor of Toowoomba carried out the alterations, which were described as being of a very grand scale, and Clifford House was also referred to as "St James' Palace". A billiard room, designed by architect James Marks, was added to Clifford House in 1883.

Taylor died at Clifford House in 1895, and his wife Sarah remained at Clifford House until her death in 1908. The property passed to her son James, who lived there for a number of years, during which time much of the grounds surrounding Clifford House were subdivided and sold. After James Taylor's death in 1939 the property passed to Henrietta Lethbridge, Taylor's cousin. Upon Henrietta's death in 1972, the property passed to the Corporation of the Synod of the Diocese of Brisbane.

Clifford House was acquired by the present owners and converted to a restaurant and reception centre during the 1970s. In 1993 the ground floor of Clifford House was refurbished and leased to the Queensland Government.

== Description ==
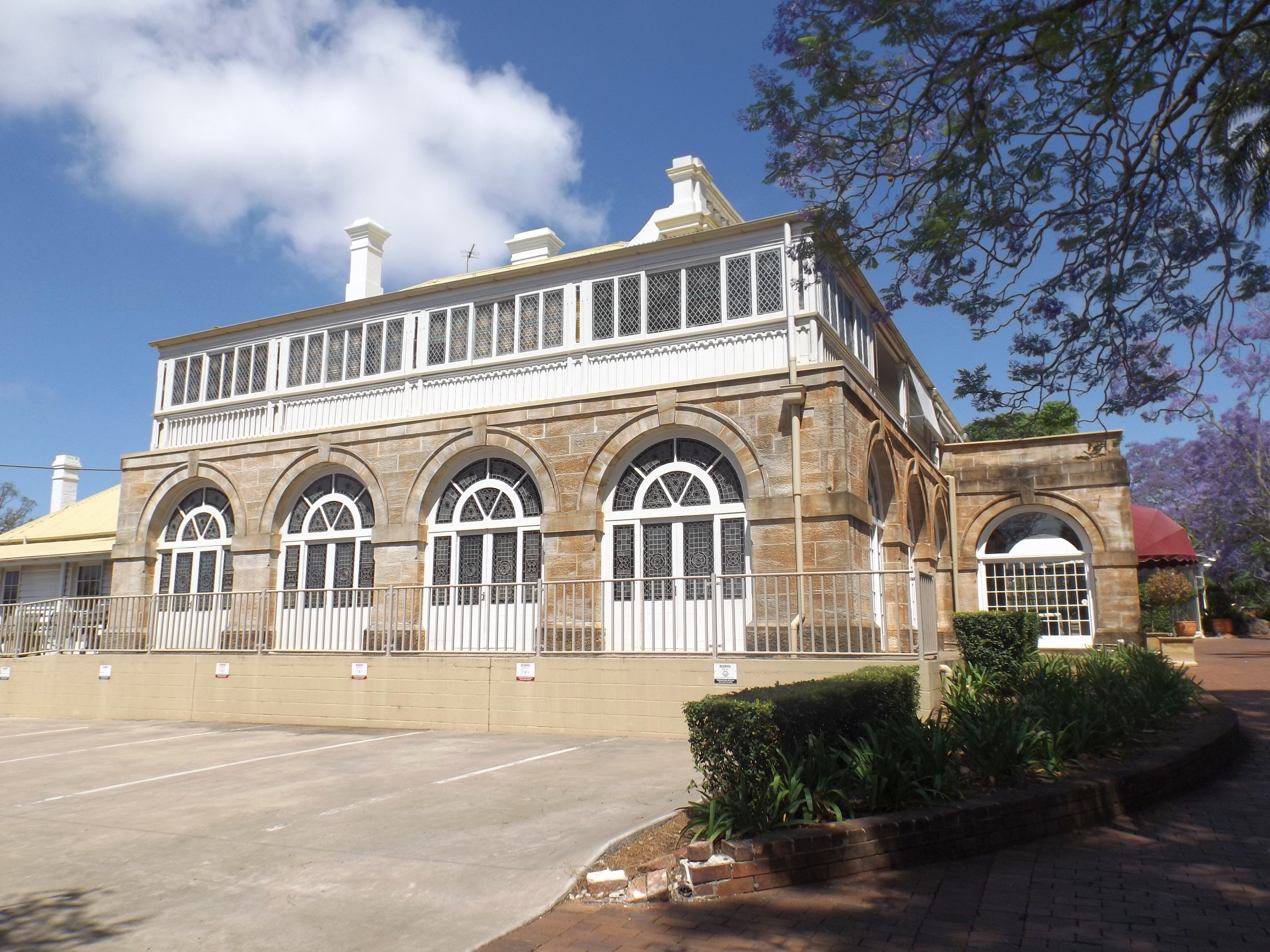
View from Clifford Street side, 2014

Clifford house is a substantial sandstone, brick and timber building set in picturesque gardens on a block bounded by Russell St, Clifford Lane and Isabel St. It comprises a two storeyed residence with a brick and sandstone base and core, timber verandahs to the first floor, and a single storeyed brick Billiard Room to the west. The residence has single-storeyed brick and weatherboard buildings to the rear, either side of a two-storeyed brick water storage tower. The buildings have corrugated iron roofs, with several substantial chimneys rising above the roof lines. The gardens contain mature trees, which contribute to the streetscape of Russell Street.

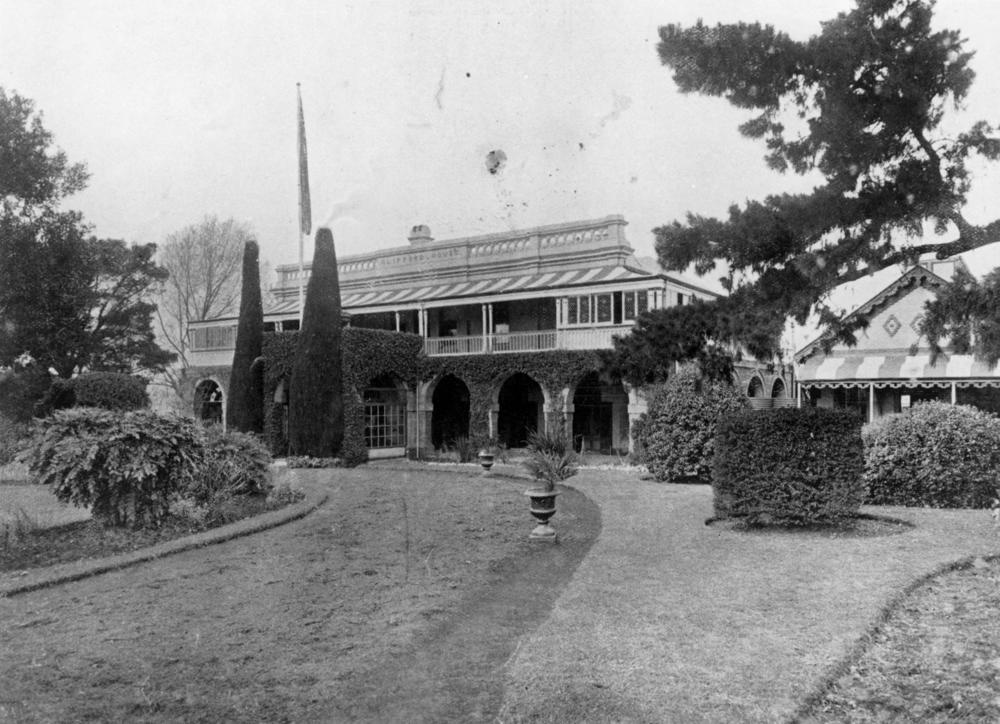
Manicured hedges and lawns at Clifford House in Toowoomba. Queensland, ca. 1908

The residence is set back from the street, and the formal, symmetrical northern frontage is approached via a circular drive. It has a sandstone and vine-covered square entrance portico, with arched openings, and an arcaded sandstone loggia (now enclosed). The verandah above has chamfered posts with square capitals, and timber balustrades with arch patterns, and diamond glazed windows to the eastern edge and north-west corner. The northern elevation is surmounted by a substantial parapet with a central panel with the words "Clifford House", flanked by a decorative balustrade.

The southern frontage of Clifford House comprises brick and timber service buildings. On the western side, a weatherboard and brick building extends out to the south; it contains the kitchen and former servants quarters, and has an enclosed verandah to the east, and a broad verandah to the west with timber stairs covered with a corrugated iron barrel vault. The brick water tower has a pitched corrugated iron roof, and is accessed by steep timber stairs, leading to a windowless room containing steel water tanks. A weatherboard building with a hipped roof, which has been extensively refurbished, adjoins the residence and water tower to the south east.

The Billiard Room adjoins the main building via a (now enclosed) walkway covered with a corrugated iron roof barrel vault with a pressed metal ceiling, which links to an ogee shaped awning supported on decorative fretted brackets to the northern face of the Billiard Room. The building has a simple rectangular form with a pitched roof, with a raised curved portion, and a chimney to the southern end. It has rectangular timber windows with timber louvred shutters, scalloped barge boards to the gable ends, and a scalloped timber trim to the awning. The northern gable is further embellished with projecting brick patterns which trace the outline of the gable, and form three central diamond patterns.

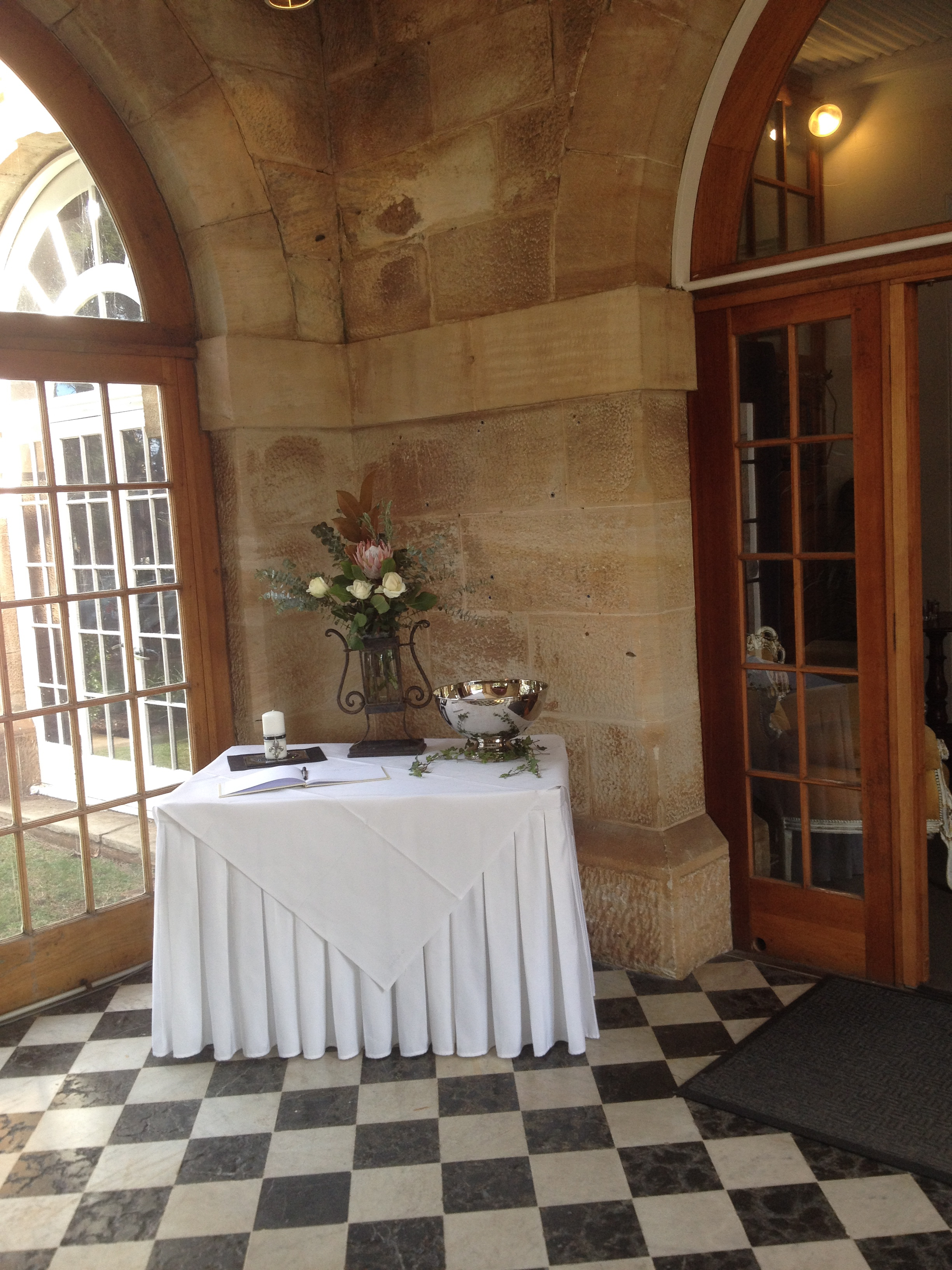
Black-and-white chequered marble tiles, 2014

Internally, the house comprises major rooms to the north opening onto the loggia spaces, either side of central corridor and stair, with smaller service rooms to the south. Upstairs has a similar floor plan. The rooms have a range of fine decorative finishes. The ground floor entrance has black and white chequered marble tiles, whilst the loggia has polished timber floorboards with truncated corner patterns, and ripple iron ceilings. The loggia is accessed via timber double doors with louvres. Internal doors to the grand rooms have delicate hand-painted floral and pastoral scenes. The front rooms have fireplaces with tiled hearths and carved timber surrounds. The north-western room has gridded sheeted ceilings and a pressed metal cornice with elongated floral motifs. Beyond the entry portico, the entrance hall has timber doors with rich coloured glass surrounds, and an arch at the foot of the stairs. The stairs are decorated with carved panels to the sides of the stairs, and have a spiral handrail over the newel post. The half-landing has coloured glass windows.

Upstairs has been extensively refurbished, but retains its arched windows, and verandahs with timber lined ceilings which access onto the roof of the portico.

The Billiard Room is an elegantly proportioned room with timber floors and raked timber lined ceilings, lit by a raised central skylight.

The gardens contain many mature trees, including Jacarandas, Camellias, maples, pines, Plane Trees, oaks, Magnolias and Macadamia trees. The western garden has a lawned area defined by smaller trees, and a sunken garden defined by a rock wall. Out buildings in the garden include a shed and a water tank.

Whilst Clifford House has been extensively refurbished internally, the exterior remains largely intact, retaining its quality as a substantial residence with a finely detailed Billiard Room, in a picturesque garden setting. Some fine internal features remain, including fireplaces, rare handpainted doors, coloured glass windows and the well-proportioned skylit space of the Billiard Room.

== Heritage listing ==
Clifford House was listed on the Queensland Heritage Register on 21 October 1992 having satisfied the following criteria.

The place is important in demonstrating the evolution or pattern of Queensland's history.

Clifford House was erected as a Gentlemen's Club, then acquired and renovated by Taylor who entertained wealthy squatters from the surrounding district.

The place demonstrates rare, uncommon or endangered aspects of Queensland's cultural heritage.

The house contains rare late 19th century handpainted doors.

The place is important because of its aesthetic significance.

The buildings, including the adjoining Billiard Room, have aesthetic quality and the grounds form an integral part of the mature streetscape of Russell Street.

The place has a special association with the life or work of a particular person, group or organisation of importance in Queensland's history.

Clifford House is a substantial 1860s masonry building, which is associated with the life and work of the Hon James Taylor, who played a prominent role in the development of Toowoomba from the 1850s.
