= Toowoomba Maltings =

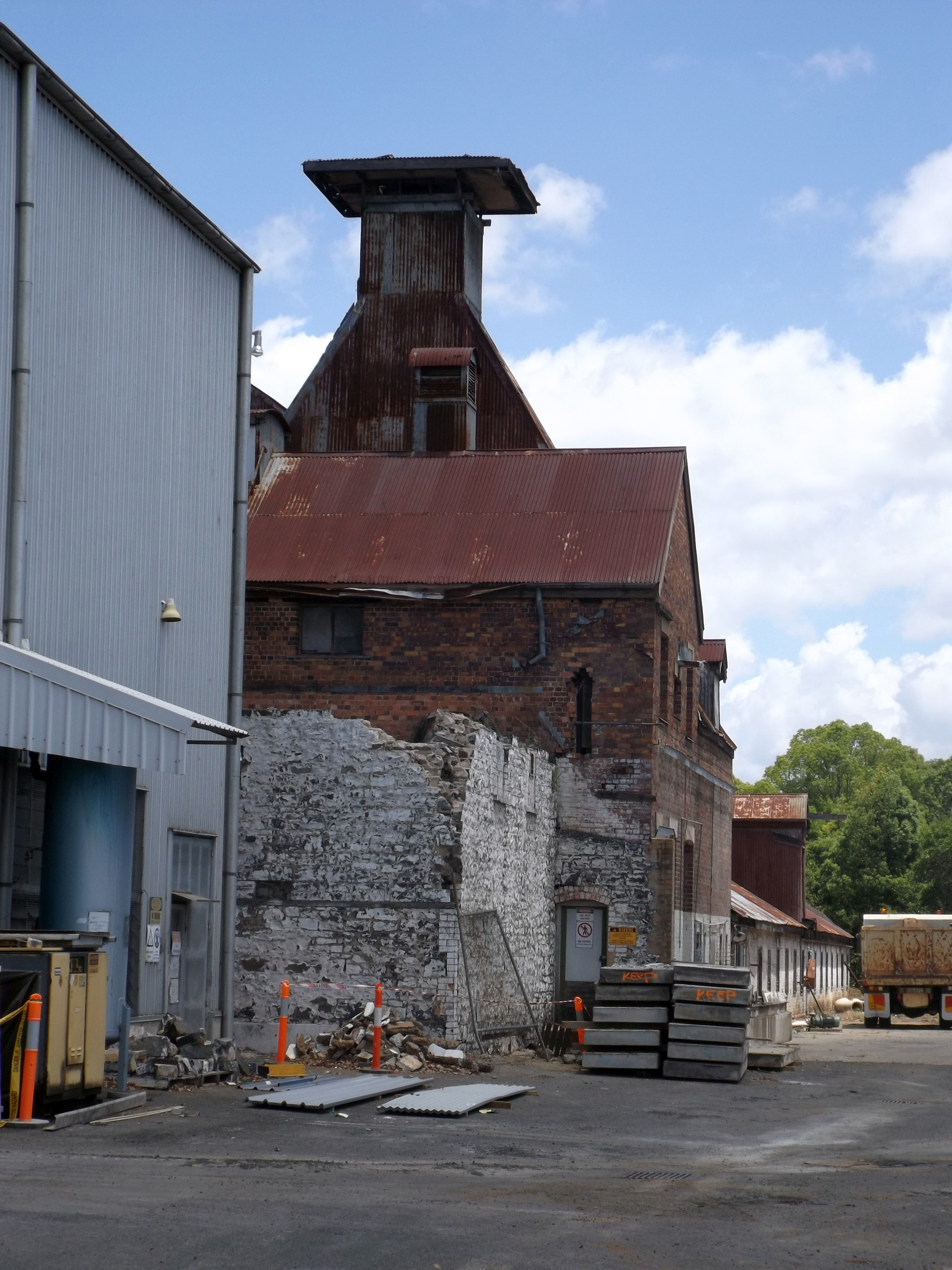
- Remnants of early malting operations in 2014

- Location within Queensland Location within Australia
- 27.5422°S 151.9433°E
- Location: 11 Mort Street, Newtown, Toowoomba, Toowoomba Region, Queensland, Australia

History
- Design period: 1870s–1890s (late 19th century)
- Built: 1899–1907

Queensland Heritage Register
- Official name: Toowoomba Maltings, Black Gully Malthouse, Darling Downs Malting Company Ltd, Paterson Redwood and Co, Queensland Brewery Co, Carlton Maltings, Northern Australia Brewers Ltd, Queensland Malting Company Ltd, Redwood's Maltings, State Wheat Board
- Type: state heritage (built)
- Designated: 21 January 1998
- Reference no.: 600852
- Significant period: 1899, 1907, (fabric); 1899–1923, 1930, 1940s, c. 1951, 1973 (historical)
- Significant components: kiln, railway siding, machinery/plant/equipment – manufacturing/processing, store/s / storeroom / storehouse

Toowoomba Maltings is a heritage-listed malthouse at 11 Mort Street, Newtown, Toowoomba, Toowoomba Region, Queensland, Australia. It was built from 1899 to 1907. It is also known as Black Gully Malthouse, Darling Downs Malting Company Ltd, Paterson Redwood and Co, Queensland Brewery Co, Carlton Maltings, Northern Australia Brewers Ltd, Queensland Malting Company Ltd, Redwood's Maltings, State Wheat Board, and William Jones and Son (Maltsters) Ltd. It was added to the Queensland Heritage Register on 21 January 1998.

== History ==
The Toowoomba Maltings comprises a complex of buildings erected in several stages, in 1899, 1907, and the 1960s at Black Gully, Toowoomba for the purpose of turning barley into malt.

The 1899 and 1907 buildings are remnants of what was a large floor malting operation. The first malt house was erected on the Black Gully site in 1897 for the Darling Downs Malting Company Ltd to the design of architects, J Marks and Son. It was operated by the famous New Zealand malting family, the Redwoods, who were instrumental in developing the malting industry on the Darling Downs and in encouraging Downs' farmers to grow and harvest barley for malting. Alphonso H Redwood was the managing director. The site had ready access to a water supply (Black Gully is a tributary of Gowrie Creek) and to transport (a railway siding known as Redwood's Siding was constructed to link the malthouse with the adjacent main south and west railway lines).

The second malthouse known as the big malt house was erected in c. 1899 on a site adjoining what then became known as the small malt house and was operated by Paterson Redwood and Co. Later called the Queensland Malting Company Ltd, members of the Redwood family were also associated with this company as minor shareholders, with the directors and major shareholders being Francis J Paterson (later Town Clerk of Toowoomba) and Townsville merchant, Samuel Nesbitt Allen.

In 1901, both malthouses were purchased by Vernon Redwood and P O'Brien with Redwood soon after purchasing the interest of O'Brien. The business was then operated under the name Redwood, by Vernon (who had been chief maltster for Perkins and Co in Toowoomba and who later served as Mayor and a Member of the Legislative Assembly) with his father and brothers. The business was purchased in 1904 by English malsters, William Jones and Son (Malsters) Ltd with Vernon Redwood as general manager (1904–13). The company, described as one of the largest malsters in the world, also imported most of the English malt coming into Australia. After federation and the imposition of duty on malt, the company needed to establish themselves in Australia, to maintain that business.

In 1906 major additions were commenced. In addition to the two malthouses, there was already on the site a brewery tower (erected c. 1898) and residential accommodation. The additions costing £6,999 were designed and supervised by Toowoomba architect Harry Marks of James Marks and Son. They comprised the erection of a new malthouse and kilns which were linked to the 1899 malthouse and the conversion of the existing brewery tower to a high water storage reservoir. The new malthouse included steeping tanks, a large polished cement germinating floor, two kilns, malt dressing rooms, and a number of pine storage bins. Elevators and a conveyor belt, which traversed the length of the building, transported the grain in its various stages. The malt storage chamber was fitted with 38 Marks patented reversible casement windows and a number of Marks's roof ventilators. Special kiln top ventilators were also designed by Marks, who was described as being gifted with inventive genius. The new complex, described as the biggest in the Commonwealth, was opened on 1 June 1907. The contractor was Montague Ivory with the plastering (including the cement germinating floor) by WJ Waldron, ironwork by the Toowoomba Foundry, and plumbing by Partridge and Co.

In 1923, the land was acquired by the Crown and was used by the State Wheat Board for the storage of wheat until 1930, when the newly formed Barley Board, established to deal with surplus crops, reopened the malthouse which was leased to Queensland Brewery Co who agreed to malt all barley of malting quality delivered by the Barley Board. During World War II, malting operations ceased and the site was occupied by the defence forces. In 1959 the complex was purchased by the Northern Australian Brewers Ltd, who had leased the complex from 1951. A $1 million modernisation and expansion program was commenced in 1968. This included the erection of new buildings to house automatic malting technology. About this time the 1897 malthouse and part of the 1899 building were demolished.

In 1973, the Maltings were transferred to Carlton United Brewers (NQ) Ltd. In 1987, the portion of land formerly containing the water tower and other associated buildings was sold. The remaining portion containing the floor maltings and the automated maltings has been transferred a number of times since. The floor maltings are no longer in use, however automated malting is still carried out on the site.

== Description ==
Bounded on the north east by Mort Street and the Western railway line and by Black Gully on the north west, the Maltings complex is located in a mixed residential and industrial area of Toowoomba. A railway siding runs between the buildings and the gully.

A rectilinear block of connected buildings consisting of two stone kilns, a malt dressing area, two brick kilns and a brick shed are remnants of earlier malting operations on the site. The present malting plant is housed in large sheds on the eastern and southern sides of the older buildings.

The two 1899 painted bluestone kilns, the oldest surviving buildings, are of coursed rubble construction. Each kiln has two levels with the lower level partly below ground. In the centre of each is a furnace which provided the heat for the drying process which took place on the upper level. A radial timber framed floor separates the two levels. The stone kilns have hipped corrugated iron roofs with large metal clad ventilators located at the peaks.

A gable roofed brick malt-dressing area separates the stone kilns from two slightly larger kilns. Machinery for processing grain (cleaning, moving, grading) is located on timber platforms at different levels connected by timber stairs. Sky lights over this area have rolled iron roofs. Rooms for the collection of dust are located on the upper level.

The two larger 1907 kilns are of similar design to the stone kilns but constructed of brick with brick arches on the furnace level and steel framed floors of perforated cast-iron tiles. Ventilators located at the peak of steep hip roofs have overhanging flat metal tops.

A large brick shed dominated by a corrugated iron gable roof extends to the south west of the kilns. The ground floor of the shed has a polished concrete germinating floor ventilated by timber shuttered windows. Round cast-iron columns in a grid of 14x6 bays support the timber floor and floor framing above.

On the first floor level which is built inside the roof space of the shed are timber framed malt storage bins lined with pine boards on a malthoid paper backing. A central corridor running north east to south west along the length of the shed allows access to the storage bins. On this level in the centre of the north west elevation is a dormered loading bay which opens via double timber doors onto the railway siding.

Above the central corridor under the ridge of the shed roof is a walkway and conveyor belt. The conveyor belt is connected via metal chutes with the storage bins. At the south west end of this reversible conveyor belt, opening onto the germinating floor below, are two large steeping tanks supported on steel girders. Grain elevators are located at the north east end of the conveyor belt in the malt dressing area. The shed roof has numerous skylights and Marks's ventilators.

A new skillion roofed, steel framed shed is attached to the north western side of the old buildings to provide cover for loading operations. Original tools and machinery remain in the buildings.

== Heritage listing ==
Toowoomba Maltings was listed on the Queensland Heritage Register on 21 January 1998 having satisfied the following criteria.

The place is important in demonstrating the evolution or pattern of Queensland's history.

Toowoomba Maltings is important in demonstrating the pattern of Queensland's history, in particular the development of the malting industry on the Darling Downs and the use of floor maltings.

The place demonstrates rare, uncommon or endangered aspects of Queensland's cultural heritage.

As a collection of buildings and equipment associated with the (superseded) technology of floor maltings, it demonstrates a rare aspect of Queensland's cultural heritage.

The place is important in demonstrating the principal characteristics of a particular class of cultural places.

As a collection of buildings and equipment associated with the (superseded) technology of floor maltings, it is important in demonstrating the principal characteristics of floor maltings.

The place is important because of its aesthetic significance.

It is important in exhibiting a range of aesthetic characteristics valued by the community, in particular as an example of a functional industrial aesthetic.

The place is important in demonstrating a high degree of creative or technical achievement at a particular period.

The place is important in demonstrating a high degree of technical achievement in an early 20th century floor malting complex.

The place has a special association with the life or work of a particular person, group or organisation of importance in Queensland's history.

It has a special association with the life and work of Toowoomba architects James Marks and Son, in particular Harry Marks, and is a good example of their industrial work.
