= Weetwood, Toowoomba =

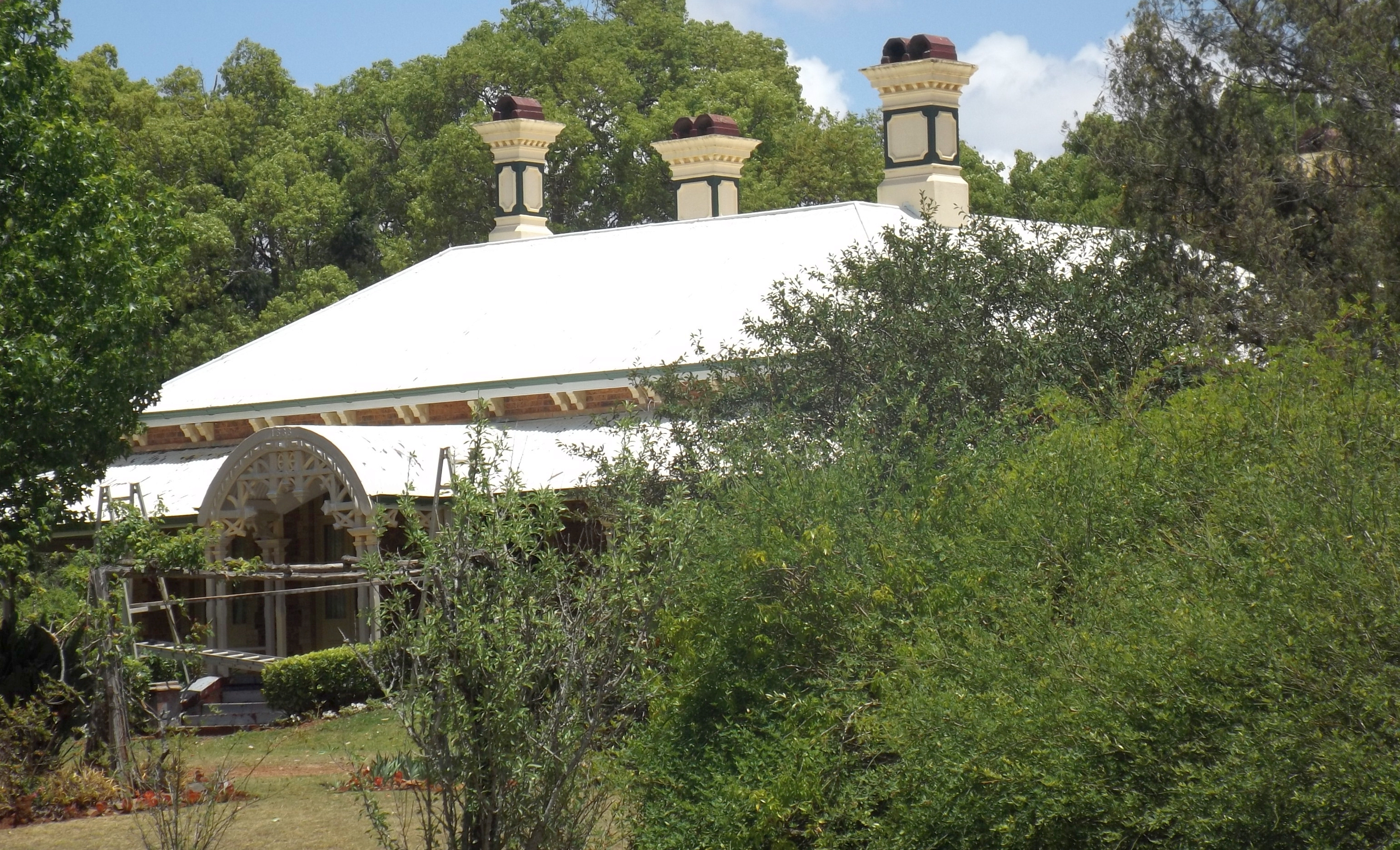
- Residence and gardens, 2014

- Location within Queensland Location within Australia
- 27.5578°S 151.9279°E
- Location: 427 Tor Street, Newtown, Toowoomba, Toowoomba Region, Queensland, Australia

History
- Design period: 1870s–1890s (late 19th century)
- Built: 1888–

Site notes
- Architect: James Marks

Queensland Heritage Register
- Official name: Weetwood
- Type: state heritage (built, landscape)
- Designated: 21 October 1992
- Reference no.: 600870
- Significant period: 1880s–1890s (fabric); 1880s–1930s (historical)
- Significant components: lawn/s, trees/plantings, residential accommodation – main house, kitchen/kitchen house, lead light/s, garden/grounds

Weetwood is a heritage-listed Georgian style villa at 427 Tor Street, Newtown, Toowoomba, Toowoomba Region, Queensland, Australia. It was designed by architect James Marks and built from 1888 onwards. It was added to the Queensland Heritage Register on 21 October 1992.

== History ==
Weetwood, a residence at 427 Tor Street, Toowoomba, is an ornate brick house built in 1888 for Richard William Scholefield.

The allotments on which this residence is situated were originally a part of the land purchased in 1862 as Portion 176, parish Drayton, County of Aubigny (160 acres), by James Taylor, politician and Mayor of Toowoomba in 1890; Thomas George Robinson, stock and land salesman and first Australian-born Mayor of Toowoomba in 1865; and James Watts Grimes, a local auctioneer.

During 1873, the title to Portion 176 was transferred to George Beresford King before it was again sold four years later. Thomas George Robinson was once more registered as a joint owner of the land along with James Williams and Gustavus Hamilton. On 28 March 1883, Robinson died, and the following year Hamilton died, soon after which Williams subdivided the land for sale. Subdivisions 11 to 14 comprising 6 acres were sold to Richard William Scholefield for £200 and registered in his name in December 1884. Scholefield was born in England in 1844, the son of William Scholefield and Charlotte Hay. He arrived in Australia in 1862 and went to Westbrook Station Station for "colonial experience". Between 1868 and 1873 he managed "Avington Downs" and "Alice Downs" on the Barcoo until they were sold. Francis Thomas Gregory, who moved to Queensland in 1862 and subsequently served as a member of the Queensland Legislative Council and as Commissioner of Crown Lands in Toowoomba, then offered Scholefield the job of managing Westbrook Station. He remained there until 1878 when Westbrook was sold and then entered into a partnership with Gregory in a stock and station firm located in Russell Street, Toowoomba.

In Toowoomba, Scholefield quickly acquired a prominent profile. He served as a Justice of the Peace and was a distinguished member of various local clubs, including the Downs Club and the Toowoomba Turf Club. His land in Tor Street adjoined the racecourse (now known as Clifford Park Racecourse), and between 1878 and 1902 Scholefield held the positions of steward, secretary, trustee and committee member with the Turf Club, which instituted the Weetwood Handicap to honour his work. This race is still held annually in March. Scholefield was also a committee member of the Toowoomba Hospital and the Royal Agricultural Society of Queensland.

In the 4 years after acquiring the land on which Weetwood now stands, Scholefield was continually stumping and burning off but it remained unimproved until 1888 when tenders were called for the construction of Weetwood. Scholefield kept meticulous records pertaining to the house, which was designed by James Marks and built by Robert Godsall. Both Marks and Godsall had previously worked together on the construction of St Patrick's Cathedral in Toowoomba and were well known in the area for their work. Marks was one of Toowoomba's most prolific and experienced late-19th century architects and his most significant buildings include the Royal Bank of Queensland building, the Imperial Hotel, and St Stephen's Presbyterian Church.

Of the several grand private residences in Toowoomba designed by Marks, Weetwood remains one of his best. It was constructed to exacting standards, with Marks advising contractors to "take care that no paint or other stains are left on the floors or walls" and that "any damage done ... by the contractors or the man in his employment will have to be made good at his (the contractors) own cost". This exactness was as much a reflection of Marks's professional application as it was an indication that Weetwood was intended to be the perfect home for Scholefield, his wife, Eva Louisa Scholefield, and their three children who were all born at Weetwood. No expense was spared, with the house costing a total of just under £2350 to build and Scholefield having 21 cases of fine furniture for his new house shipped from London on board the Taroba during 1888. With four chimneys set into the U-shaped ridge roof for the six open fireplaces, the verandah roof is particularly striking. Made of corrugated iron, it is penetrated by a distinctive barrel-roofed entry porch with a highly ornate entry pediment. The inscription '1888' adorns the pediment leading to the verandah.

Construction ran smoothly during the latter half of 1888 and Scholefield recorded that he "commenced to reside" at Weetwood on 1 January 1889. The house was named after his father's home in Leeds, England, and the premises included a lawn tennis court and stables described by Scholefield's daughter as "beautifully built with tongue and grooved hardwood timber, and [consisting] ... of three horse stalls, a large buggy shed for two buggies, a harness room, a feed room, and a man's room". On the 6 acres of land the Scholefields also maintained a paddock for horses and cows as well as a fowl yard. The large garden included a variety of fruit trees and vegetables, which was attended to by a full-time gardener, George Smith, who was with the family for 20 years.

Following Scholefield's death in March 1902, his wife continued to reside there until her death in 1939. However, it was not until July 1945 that title to the property was registered in the joint names of Hector Kitchener McPhie and Victor Alexander Carpendale McPhie. Two years later Hector Kitchener McPhie became the sole owner of the estate and in 1948 transferred subdivisions 11 and 12, which left Weetwood standing on the present parcel of 2 acres.

In 1952, title to Weetwood was transferred to dentist Campbell Stuart Jiear, before being bought by Dr Harry Ashton in 1954. In the 30 years Dr Ashton and his family lived in the home, the imposing cedar doors, architraves and skirting boards were refurbished. Weetwood was bought in 1984 by local dentist Kevin Bennett and his wife Kerri, adding an in-ground swimming pool, shed and new boundary fencing. In 2020 the McAllister Family purchased the property and placed it into Weetwood Homestead Trust, restoring the gardens and circular driveway. The magnificent and richly historic home is now available to use for private functions and ceremonies. The original stables for the house are no longer on the grounds, but are located at 11 Tancred Avenue from previous subdivision of the estate

== Description ==
Weetwood is situated on the corner of Tor and Higgins Streets on two large allotments in West Toowoomba. They are each 4,047 square metres (43,560 sq ft) in size and abut the Clifford Park Racecourse to the west. Tor Street has two lanes of traffic running in each direction and is therefore very busy, particularly with a number of large vehicles. The Toowoomba city centre is located approximately 2.5 kilometres (1.6 mi) to the east.

The single storey residence is sited close to the western boundary with the Racecourse, approximately straddling the common boundary of the allotments. This provides a wide buffer of space between it and the road traffic. All exterior boundaries are lined with established trees and planting, allowing only partial glimpses of the house. There are two entries onto the site from Tor Street, however only the one toward the north-east corner is currently in use. The allotments are largely flat, and the house is founded on a base of raised ground, approximately half a metre high. This provides a 1.5-metre (4 ft 11 in) wide skirt of flat ground around the house, the edges of which slope steeply away. The sloped edge is less prominent at the south-east corner. The front facade best reflects the principles of unforced symmetry to which the design of the house largely adheres.

Weetwood's main hipped roof is U-shaped and surrounded on three sides by a curved verandah roof. This is penetrated by a barrel-roofed entry porch and elaborately framed timber pediment. A ridged roof joins the main one on the north-west corner of the building. The exterior walls to the main house are face brickwork. Along the length of the house's west face, is attached a skillion-roofed extension. This is clad externally in chamferboards. Located between the house and the western boundary is a large gable-roofed carport area. At the south-west corner this roof has been halted to allow for a pergola and small gable-roofed shed clad in weatherboards. These recent structures run the full length of the original house.

All roofs are clad in corrugated galvanized iron and the main one is decorated with acroteria. The small overhang to the main U-shaped roof is supported by a series of double, carved timber brackets. These rest on a lip of brick extruded from the external wall. The brackets do not feature on the rear western facade. The eaves of the main roof are lined with painted, shot-edge timber boards. Two double and two single chimneystacks protrude through the main roof, and all are rendered and painted brickwork.

The verandah edges rest on 25-centimetre (9.8 in) high brick walls and are capped with painted timber boards. The posts are divided into two parts by stop chamfering, and have astragals, capitals and carved timber brackets. On the east-facing edge, a low timber seat fits between each post and forms a simple balustrade. The verandah area's floor is clad in narrow shot-edge timber boards and is approximately 3 metres (9.8 ft) wide. The exposed underside of its curved roof is not supported by rafters, except where a hip occurs, such as where the barrel-roofed entry porch intersects with it. The verandah area looking north is partially enclosed by timber framing that supports some fixed glass, a sliding glass door and a low weatherboard-clad balustrade. All timberwork, except that lining the floor, is painted.

A short flight of stairs brings the visitor under the entry portico up to the front door of the house. The portico's pediment timberwork is elaborately framed in a style that James Marks & Sons became renowned for, while the front door has leadlight glass and timber panels to each side and a full-width, semi-circular fanlight above. All rooms overlooking the verandah have one or two sets of double doors with rectangular glass fanlights opening onto it. These double doors are all low waisted. A corbelled pattern of light brickwork, differentiated from the predominant dark speckled brick, surrounds all door and window openings. A large timber panel-clad bay window projects from the northern face of the house into the verandah space.

Interiors Contained beneath the main U-shaped roof are six rooms opening off a central hallway, which is accessed via the front door. This hall is divided in two by an arched opening. The semi-circular arch rests on plasterwork relief capitals. Two rooms open off the first segment of the hallway. These are currently used as bedrooms. The room to the right is extended by the bay that looks onto the north-facing verandah. This bay has two double-hung sash windows in its front face, and one on each of its angled sides. The sill height matches the low waist of the double doors. On the wall it shares with the adjoining room, this room also has an ornately carved timber mantelpiece and fireplace lined with ceramic tiles. A metal fire grate sits on the hearth, which is also lined with ceramic tiles. These walls only feature a plaster picture-rail fixed at approximately 3.5 metres (11 ft). The room opening to the left off the central hallway has a mantelpiece and fireplace without ceramic tiles, also in its west-facing wall. The mantelpiece is decorated with simple, applied timber shapes and the hearth is edged with a low timber rail. A door opens from this bedroom into the next room along the hall.

Four rooms open off the second segment of the hallway. The first on the left is used as a bedroom. It has a mantelpiece and fireplace in the wall it shares with the next room towards the rear of the hall. This mantelpiece and fireplace match those in the bedroom described earlier, however there is no timber guardrail. The last room to open to the left off the hallway again has a simply decorated timber mantelpiece. However, its fireplace does feature an ornate rim and grate. Its guardrail, hearth and sides are lined with tiles, but only a few matching those in the first bedroom remain in place. A full-height, built-in cupboard has been attached to the wall between the fireplace and the exterior wall. It is lined with fibrous cement sheeting and is clearly a later addition as it disturbs the pattern of boards on the floor. In this room's west-facing wall there are a double-hung sash window and a door. These open onto the space contained by the rear skillion roof.

The first room that opens to the right off the second segment of the central hallway is used as a living room. Its fireplace and hearth, back-to-back with that in the first bedroom, are made of brick, while the mantel is of timber. Its walls have a painted timber picture rail fixed at 2.5 metres (8 ft 2 in). The second room off this side of the hallway is used for dining. The design of its mantelpiece and fireplace matches the geometry of those found in the three rooms to the left of the hallway. It is centred on this room's northern wall, which it shares with the kitchen. The skirting in the dining room differs from those found elsewhere. Doors open from this room into the living room, the kitchen and a study to the rear of the house.

The floors throughout the main house are lined with wide, tongue and groove Pine boards. In the dining room and kitchen tiles have been laid over these. The floor to the fourth bedroom, in the south-west corner of the main house, is encircled with three rows of timber boards. The central line of boards is finished with a dark stain. There are eight-inch skirtings throughout, as there are six-inch architraves. All joinery and mouldings are of polished Cedar. The ceilings in each of the six main rooms and in the hallway are approximately 4 metres (13 ft) high. The kitchen, which sits under the ridged roof, also has a ceiling this high. The walls throughout are plaster. The original plaster ceilings in all the main rooms have been lined with fibrous cement sheeting and decorated with simple timber beading. The cornices in the second and third bedrooms, and in the living room are simple scotias. Those in the other rooms are simply timber boards fixed to the ceiling. Square, lattice grills are centred in the ceilings of the second and fourth bedrooms, and the dining room. Metal ones are featured in these and other rooms.

At the rear of the central hallway, a door with plain glass side panels and rectangular fanlight opens onto the space contained under the skillion roof. This opens into the carport area with a door and a number of small double-hung sash windows. The bathroom is situated at the southern end of this corridor of space. And at its northern end are a study opening with two double doors into the dining room, and a laundry opening into the kitchen. The brickwork remains exposed on the rear wall of the main house, which it shares with this corridor. The carport area consists of a very large covered space running the full length of the house and two storage sheds, which sit between it and the rear boundary to the Racecourse. This is where the original service wing would have been located.

Grounds Weetwood is surrounded by a large garden with low planting and many established trees. To the north between the house and the boundary are located a large area of paved driveway and a small gable-roofed shed clad in weatherboards. A vine hedge separates this from a fenced swimming pool. Along the boundary to Tor Street, on either side of the currently unused entry, stand two Norfolk Island pines (Araucaria heterophylla). Between the house and its boundary with Higgins Street stands a large bunya pine (Araucaria bidwillii) in an area fenced off from the rest of the property. There is also a large bougainvillea (Bougainvillea spectabilis) between this tree and the house. In the south-western corner of the second allotment is a smaller fenced-off pen with a timber and iron shelter, which may be the original fowl yard. All boundaries have timber-paling fences.

This property is currently undergoing major alterations and additions. The rear structure chook pen, most large trees and the rear sheds have been demolished.
