= Fairholme College =

Fairholme College, Toowoomba

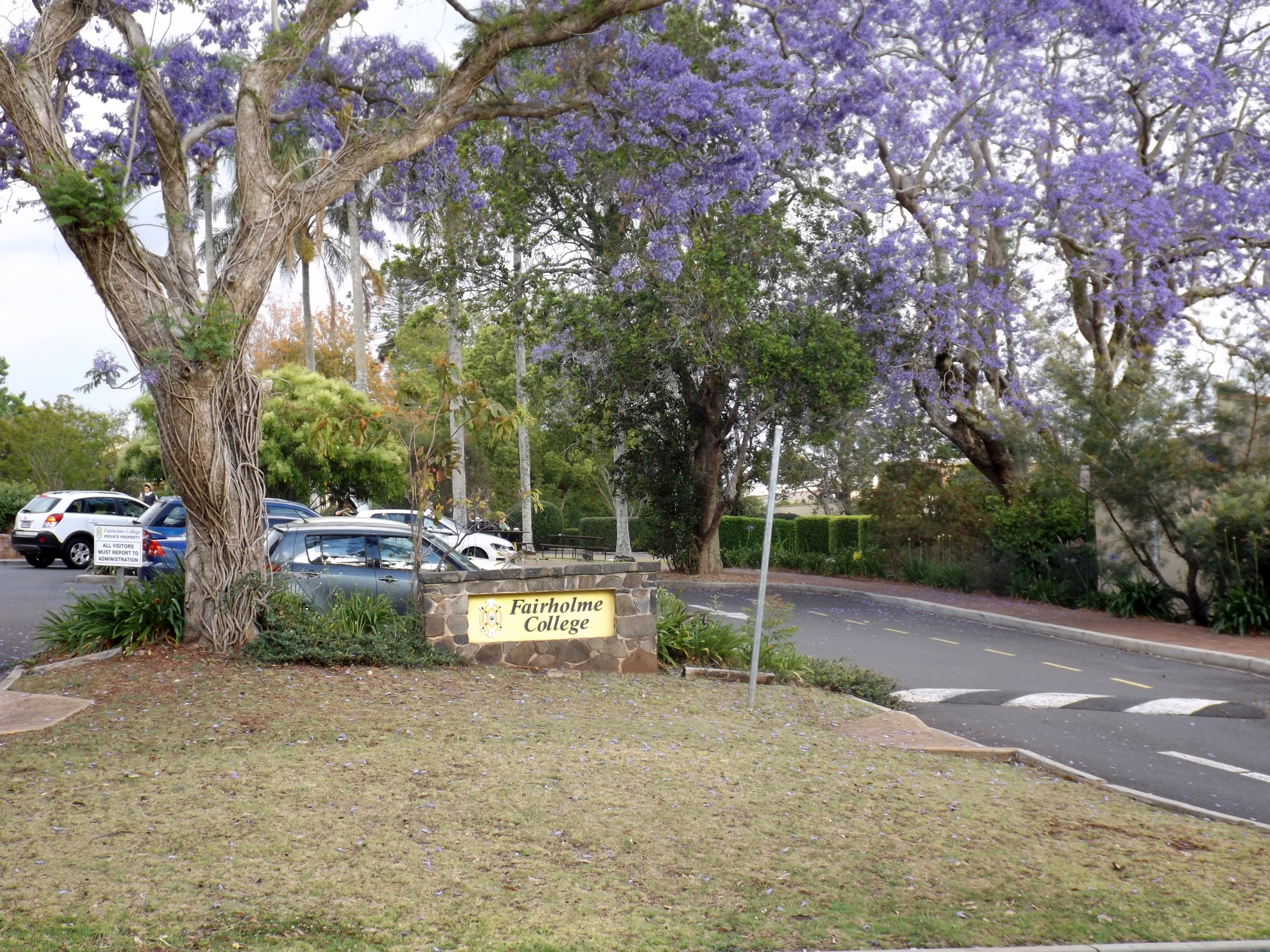

Location
- 40 Wirra Wirra Street; Toowoomba, Queensland, 4350; Australia
- Coordinates: 27.5557°S 151.9780°E

Information
- Type: Independent, day and boarding
- Motto: Latin: Ardens Sed Virens (Burning yet Flourishing)
- Denomination: Presbyterian
- Established: 1908
- Chairman: I.C. Andersen
- Principal: L. Evans
- Chaplain: Catherine Butler
- Gender: Girls
- Enrolment: ~845 (P–12)
- Colours: Navy, black and gold
- Slogan: Faith in her Future
- Website: fairholme.qld.edu.au

Fairholme College is an independent, day and boarding school for girls, located in Toowoomba, one of Australia's largest provincial cities, in South East Queensland, Australia.

Established as Spreydon College in 1908 by sisters Elizabeth, Jessie and Margaret Thomson, the college has a non-selective enrolment policy, and currently caters for approximately 845 students from Kindergarten to Year 12, including 240 boarders in Years 5 to 12. It is the only school associated with the Presbyterian Church of Queensland that is not owned by the Presbyterian and Methodist Schools Association (PMSA), and is one of a small number of Presbyterian schools in Australia.

Fairholme is a member of the Alliance of Girls' Schools Australasia (AGSA), the Junior School Heads Association of Australia (JSHAA), the Association of Heads of Independent Schools of Australia (AHISA), and the Australian Boarding Schools' Association (ABSA).

== History ==
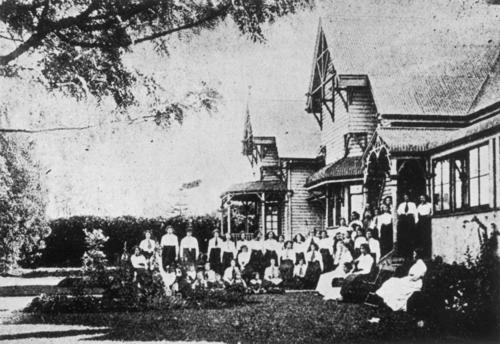
Pupils and staff of Spreydon College, ca.1914

In 1907, sisters Elizabeth, Jessie and Margaret Thomson, all former teachers of the Presbyterian Ladies' College, Melbourne, moved to Toowoomba, with the idea of establishing a girls' school conducted according to the standards of the Secondary Teachers' Association of Victoria. They leased the now heritage-listed house Spreydon, a property with over an acre of land on the corner of Warra and Rome Streets at Newtown in the west of Toowoomba, and on 4 February 1908, opened the privately owned Spreydon College, a Christian boarding and day school for girls. Commencing with a roll of 20 boarders and "quite a number of day girls", the school offered classes from Kindergarten to "Sydney Senior Standard". The Spreydon building housed the Principal and boarders' quarters, while a school room, Kindergarten and tennis court were established facing Rome Street.

The sisters soon sought the patronage of the Presbyterian Church in Brisbane, and this was granted in May 1909. The school proved popular, and steady growth in students numbers necessitated the construction of new dormitories early in 1911, with the school's boarding population nearing 16 out of the 60 pupils enrolled.

The Thomson's established their school along the lines of the Presbyterian Ladies' College, Melbourne, ensuring that all teachers were specialists, that students achieved high academic standards, and that girls were active in sporting interests and displaying good manners and Christian standards. However, at the end of 1914, financial difficulties forced the sisters to resign and return to Melbourne, prompting the Convenor of the Presbyterian Church in Queensland, the Rev. James Gibson, to give an undertaking that the Church would assume ownership of the school. A private company, The Presbyterian Ladies College Limited, was established, and Spreydon College was subsequently renamed and reopened in January 1915 as "The Presbyterian Ladies' College, Toowoomba" (P.L.C). The Church also appointed Amy Carson as Principal that same year.

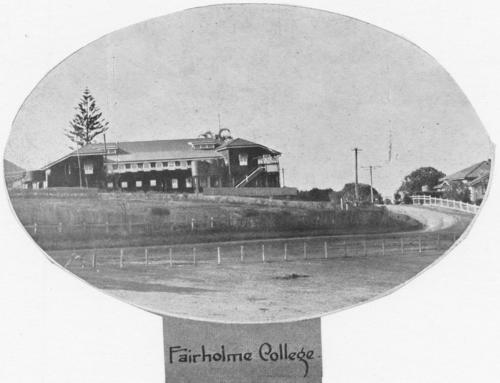
Fairholme College, Toowoomba, 1932

P.L.C flourished under Carson's leadership, and the Spreydon property soon proved too small. Margaret Ann Cameron, the owner of the Fairholme Homestead on the Range in East Toowoomba, soon expressed to the Church her desire to establish a girls' school, having previously taught her daughters and other children in Glen Innes, New South Wales during the 1860s. Cameron passed ownership of her property to the Presbyterian Church, and under a new constitution, Carson, together with the College board, opened the Presbyterian Girls' College, Toowoomba in the Fairholme property with 59 students. The relocation of the school was achieved over two stages: the primary departments moved in July 1917, and the rest of the school in January 1918. The motto which was used at The Presbyterian Ladies College Limited, Ardens sed Virens ("Burning yet Flourishing") was adopted for use at Fairholme.

The Presbyterian, Methodist and Congregational Churches were united in June 1977, to be known as The Uniting Church in Australia. St. Stephen's Church, of which the school was closely related, formed part of this movement and it was therefore presumed that Fairholme would become a College of the Uniting Church. Queensland's Presbyterian schools such as The Scots PGC College, Somerville House, Clayfield College and Brisbane Boys' College, either became Uniting or became part of the Presbyterian and Methodist Schools Association network, while Fairholme remained with the Presbyterian Church of Queensland. Subsequently, it is the only College in Queensland owned by the Presbyterian Church, and it remains one of a very small number throughout Australia, with the only other girls schools being the Presbyterian Ladies' College, Armidale; the Presbyterian Ladies' College, Sydney; and the Presbyterian Ladies' College, Melbourne.

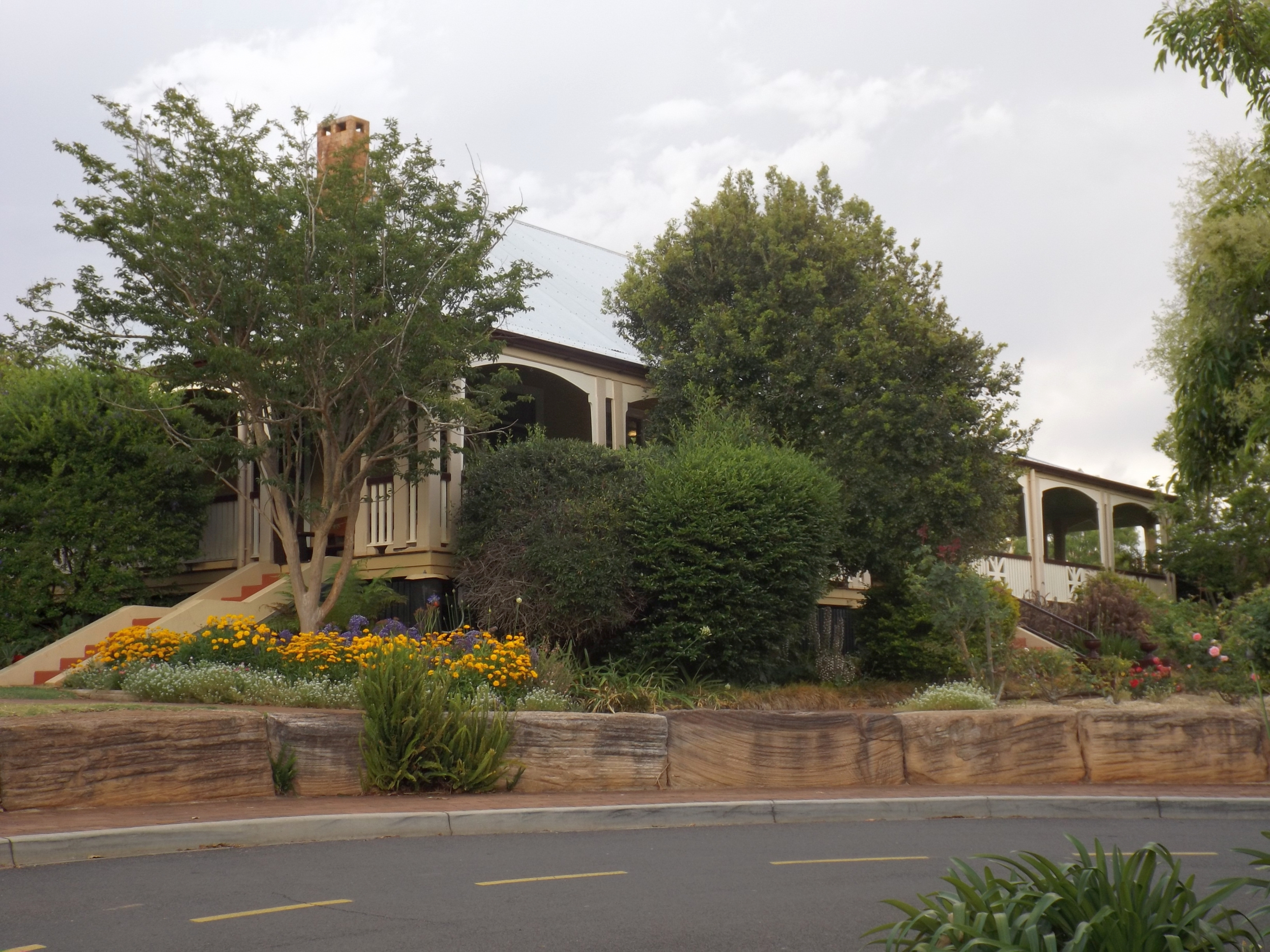
Cameron Homestead, 2014

In March 1978, the name of the College was changed from "Presbyterian Girls' College, Fairholme, Toowoomba" to "Fairholme College, a College of the Presbyterian Church of Queensland". It had however been known as Fairholme since its inception.

== Principals ==
Period	Details
1917–1919	Amy Carson
1920–1921	Nancy Jobson
1922–1940	Daisy Culpin
1940–1948	Jean Tassie
1949–1951	The Revd. Norman Joughin
1952–1953	Revd. Richard Crawford
1954–1968	Nancy Shaw
1969–1972	Pamela Harris
1973–1974	Robert Clinch
1975–1979	Belle Gillies
1980–1994	Allan Faragher
1994–2009	Stan Klan
2009–present	Linda Evans

== House system ==
As with most Australian schools, Fairholme utilises a house system. The houses of the College are:

- Black House (Black) – Named after benefactor W.R. Black.
- Cameron House (Gold) – Named after the original owner of the property "Fairholme", Anne Cameron.
- Powell House (Green) – Named after benefactor Ray Powell.
- Stephens House (Blue) – Named after benefactor, S.G Stephens.

== Notable alumnae ==
Alumni of Fairholme College are known as Old Girls and may elect to join the schools alumni association, the Fairholme Old Girls' Association (F.O.G.A.). Some notable Fairholme Old Girls include:

- Emilee Cherry – winner of Touch Football World Cup; Australian rugby sevens representative
- Gemma Etheridge – winner of Touch Football World Cup; Australian rugby sevens representative
- Cathy Freeman OAM – Olympic gold medallist (athletics) (also attended Kooralbyn International School)
- Sally Kehoe – Olympic rower
- Laurel Martyn OBE – dancer and choreographer; President and Examiner of the Classical Dance Teachers Aust. Inc. (also attended Brisbane Girls Grammar School)
- Libby Munro – actress
- Pippa Savage – Olympic rower
- Emily Tapp – Paratriathlon World Champion

== AFL Team Achievements ==
=== Senior Female (Years 10-12) ===
- AFL Queensland Schools Cup

(silver) Runners Up: 2018

== See also ==
- List of schools in Queensland
- Education in Australia
