= Vacy Hall =

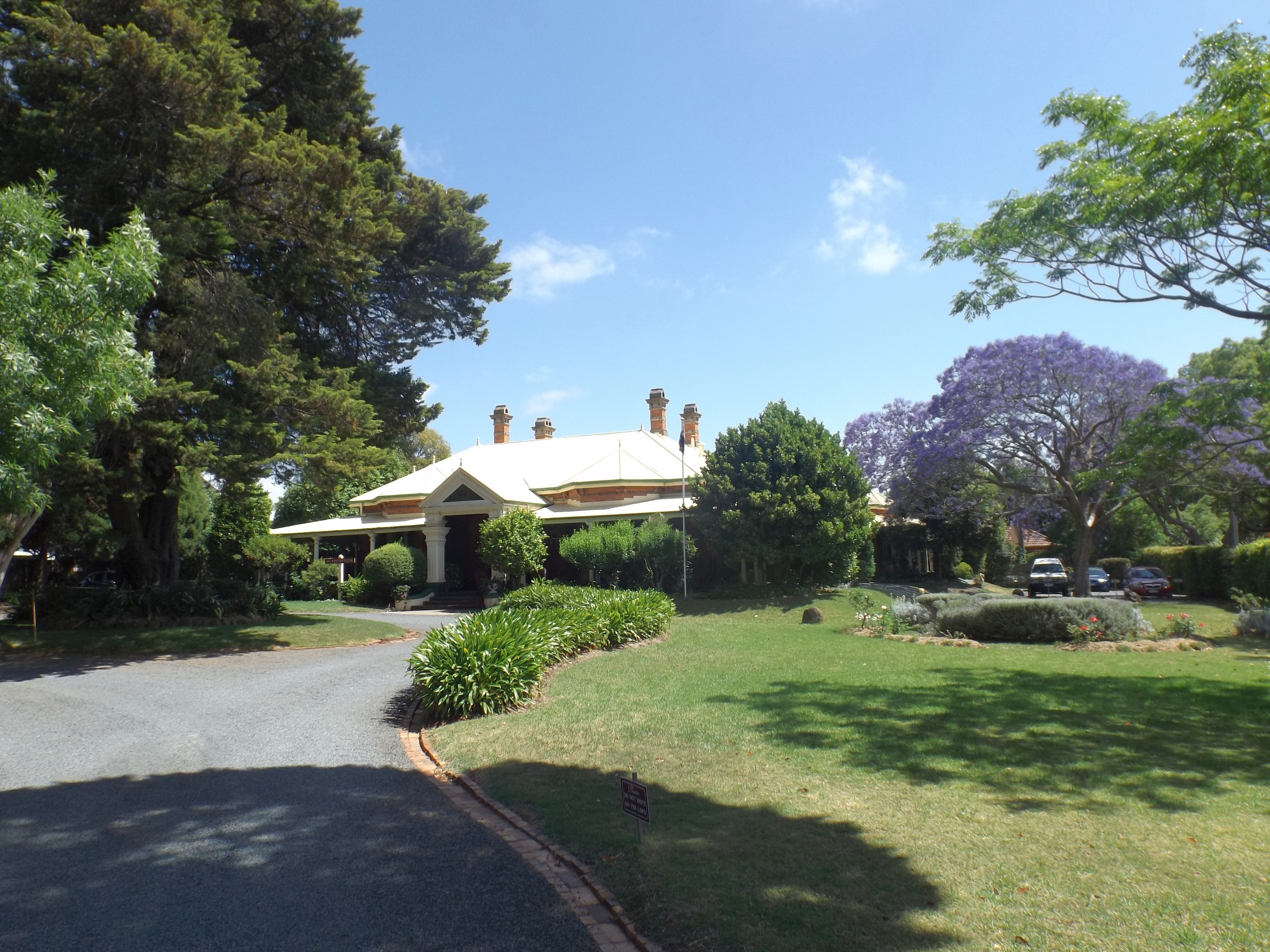
- Vacy Hall and gardens

- Location within Queensland Location within Australia
- 27.5575°S 151.9466°E
- Location: 135 Russell Street, Toowoomba, Toowoomba Region, Queensland, Australia

History
- Design period: 1870s–1890s (late 19th century)
- Built: c. 1899

Queensland Heritage Register
- Official name: Vacy Hall
- Type: state heritage (built, landscape)
- Designated: 21 October 1992
- Reference no.: 600858
- Significant period: 1890s–1920s (historical); 1890s (fabric)
- Significant components: carriage way/drive, residential accommodation – main house, service wing, lead light/s, trees/plantings, steps/stairway, lawn/s, garden/grounds

Vacy Hall is a heritage-listed villa at 135 Russell Street, Toowoomba, Toowoomba Region, Queensland, Australia. It was built c. 1899. It was added to the Queensland Heritage Register on 21 October 1992.

== History ==
This single storeyed brick residence was erected in 1899 for Gilbert Gostwyck Cory and his wife Ann Sophy, daughter of pastoralist and politician James Taylor. It is one of a number of substantial residences erected along Russell Street, including Taylor's own residence, Clifford House. Designed by notable/prolific Toowoomba architect James Marks, and built by Alexander Mayes, a prominent Toowoomba builder and three-times Mayor of Toowoomba, it was the second residence to be erected on this site.

Cory arrived in Toowoomba in the late 1850s, and was employed by Taylor at Cecil Plains Station. Cory later became Taylor's partner and was involved in other pastoral ventures in Queensland. Cory was an active member of the Toowoomba and district community, serving on both the Jondaryan Shire Council, Toowoomba Town Council; Mayor of Toowoomba in 1891; a longstanding member and President of the Royal Agricultural Society; member of the Toowoomba Hospital committee; and a founding member of the Toowoomba Turf Club.

The land on which Vacy Hall stands had been granted to William Horton in 1852, and was acquired by Taylor in 1868, as part of a number of allotments purchased by Taylor and Henry Stuart Russell in the late 1860s. A residence is believed to have been erected in the mid 1870s, possibly as a present from Taylor to his daughter on her marriage to Cory in 1873. This building was damaged by fire late in 1898.

Taylor died in 1895 and the property passed into the hands of trustees, which included Taylor's widow, two of Taylor's sons, and Cory. In 1897 the property was transferred to Ann Cory. Ann died in 1909, and the property passed to Cory, who remained at Vacy Hall until his death in 1924.

Following Cory's death, Vacy Hall had a succession of owners. It remained a private home until the 1950s when it was converted to apartments, offices and finally a boarding house/hostel.

Vacy Hall was acquired by the present owners in 1986, who refurbished the building for guest accommodation. A timber cottage constructed of materials recycled from three derelict timber houses was erected on the site c. 1989, and is used as the Reception office and manager's residence.

== Description ==
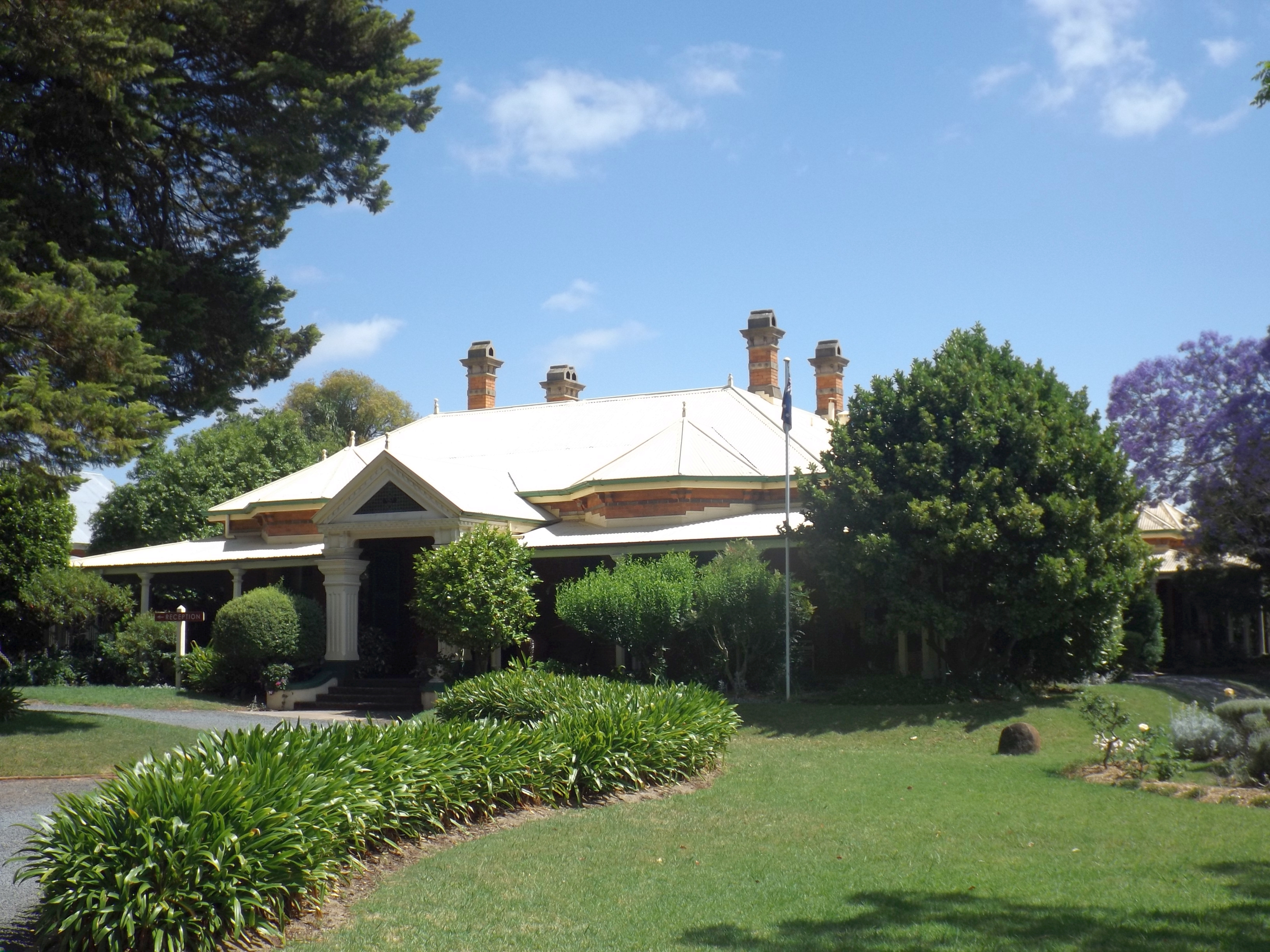
Guest house, 2014

Vacy Hall, set back from Russell Street to the south on a site sloping gently east, is surrounded by gardens and mature trees to the south and east with single-storeyed hostel buildings to the northwest.

This single-storeyed building, L-shaped in plan, has a twin hipped corrugated iron roof with a central box gutter, hipped projecting bays, a gable pediment to the south entrance and a central curved roof section to the northwest wing. The building is encircled by verandahs with lower skillion roofs, fluted square timber verandah posts and timber floors. The south elevation is symmetrical, and the entrance pediment, the central section of which is glazed in leadlight with the inscription VACY HALL, is supported by two large, rendered, square fluted columns framing concrete steps. Step out bays with sash windows and shutters open onto south, west and east verandahs from principal rooms. The panelled entrance door has a fanlight and sidelights with leadlight glazing.

The building has English garden wall bond brickwork, with decorative glazed brickwork features including quoining to corners, bays, windows and doors, arched headers to doors and windows, a circle pattern above the entrance door and stretcher courses to the base, below the sills and below the eaves. The building has six decorative brick chimney stacks and brick eave brackets.

The main section of the building has been refurbished for guest rooms, and the northwest wing, with some sections of verandah enclosed with fibrous cement, consists of a central corridor with hostel rooms and a kitchen.

Internally, the building has cedar joinery including panelled doors with fanlights, architraves, bays with seats, fireplace surrounds and skirtings. The octagonal shaped central hall has ornate plaster mouldings and cornice, faux marble finish to arches and wall panels and a radiating parquet which continues into the front and rear halls. Walls are plastered masonry with wallpaper to dado or picture rail height. Ensuite rooms have been added.

A single-storeyed, rendered concrete block hostel with a skillion roof is built adjacent to the building on the northwest. A single-storeyed weatherboard reception, with a hipped corrugated iron roof and concrete stumps, is located adjacent to the building on the west.

The grounds include a gravel drive from Russell Street with a turning circle and brick edging, mature trees to the south and east, hedges along the south and east boundaries and an expanse of lawn with gardens to the southeast.

== Heritage listing ==
Vacy Hall was listed on the Queensland Heritage Register on 21 October 1992 having satisfied the following criteria.

The place is important in demonstrating the evolution or pattern of Queensland's history.

Vacy Hall, erected in 1899, is important in demonstrating the pattern of Queensland's history, in particular the development of Toowoomba as a prestigious residential location for Darling Downs pastoralists.

The place is important in demonstrating the principal characteristics of a particular class of cultural places.

It is important in demonstrating the principal characteristics of a substantial, late 19th century masonry Toowoomba residence, and exhibits a range of aesthetic characteristics valued by the community, in particular the contribution of the building and grounds, through form, scale, materials and plantings, to the streetscape of Russell Street and to the Toowoomba townscape; and the quality and crafting of the materials and finishes, including decorative brickwork, parquet floor, cedar joinery, plasterwork, and step-out bays.

The place is important because of its aesthetic significance.

It is important in demonstrating the principal characteristics of a substantial, late 19th century masonry Toowoomba residence, and exhibits a range of aesthetic characteristics valued by the community, in particular the contribution of the building and grounds, through form, scale, materials and plantings, to the streetscape of Russell Street and to the Toowoomba townscape; and the quality and crafting of the materials and finishes, including decorative brickwork, parquet floor, cedar joinery, plasterwork, and step-out bays.

The place has a special association with the life or work of a particular person, group or organisation of importance in Queensland's history.

It has a special association with the work of prominent Toowoomba architect, James Marks, who designed a number of residences in Toowoomba; and with James Taylor and Gilbert Cory who were influential in the early development of Toowoomba as a major rural centre.
