= James Marks (architect) =

Australian architect

James Marks (1834–1915) was an architect in Queensland, Australia. A number of his buildings are listed on the Queensland Heritage Register.

== Early life ==
James Marks was born in England in 1834, where he trained as a carpenter, and taught himself building construction, joinery and architectural drawing.

== Career ==
He emigrated to Queensland in 1866, where he immediately established himself as a builder and architect in Dalby, on the Darling Downs. In 1874 Marks moved to Toowoomba, where he practiced principally as an architect. On his elder son Henry James (Harry) Marks becoming a partner in 1892, the firm of James Marks and Son was established. This firm dominated the architectural profession in Toowoomba and district for more than half a century. James' son, Reginald Marks, also worked in the firm.

== Later life ==
James Marks died on 29 October 1915 in Toowoomba. He was buried the following day (30 October 1915) in the Presbyterian section of the Drayton and Toowoomba Cemetery.

== Works ==
James Marks' work in Toowoomba includes:

- Weetwood (1888)
- Redlands (1888–89)
- St Patrick's Roman Catholic Cathedral in James St, Toowoomba
- St Matthew's Anglican Church in Drayton

Houses designed by James Marks and Son include:

- Smithfield House (c. 1895)
- Vacy Hall (c. 1900)
