= Harristown State High School Buildings =

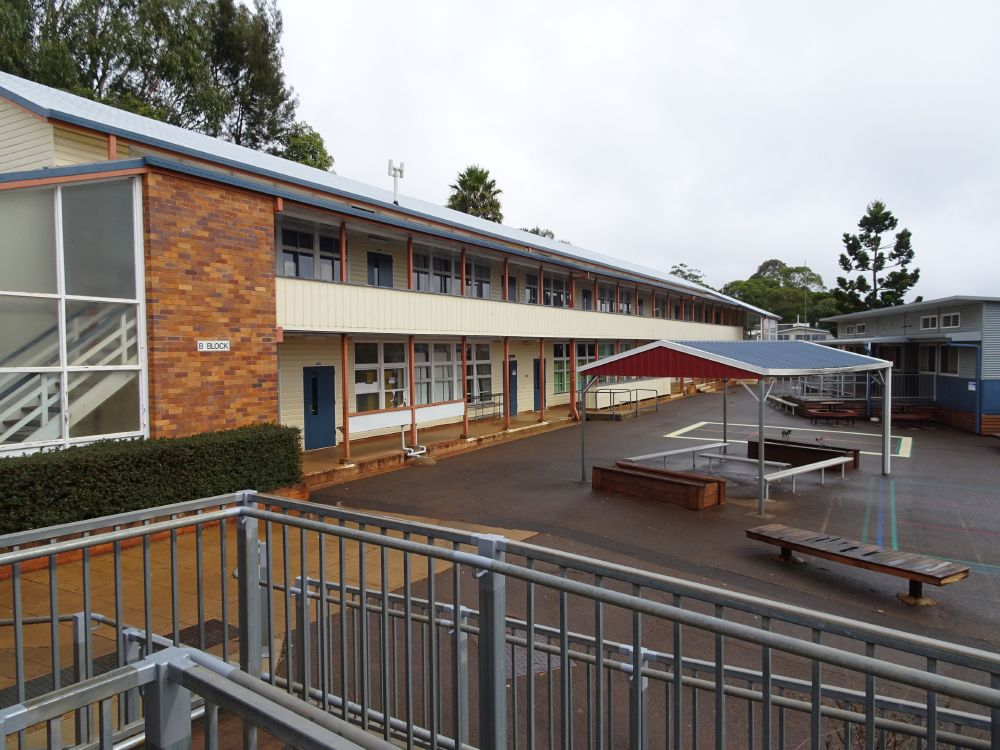
- Block B, north side

- Location within Queensland
- 27.5729°S 151.9323°E
- Location: 341–367 South Street, Harristown, Toowoomba, Toowoomba Region, Queensland, Australia

History
- Design period: 1940s–1960s (Post-WWII)
- Built: 1954–1972

Queensland Heritage Register
- Official name: Harristown State High School
- Type: state heritage
- Designated: 19 August 2016
- Reference no.: 650037
- Type: Education, Research, Scientific Facility: School – state (high)
- Theme: Educating Queenslanders: Providing secondary education

Harristown State High School Buildings is a heritage-listed collection of state high school buildings at Harristown State High School at 341–367 South Street, Harristown, Toowoomba, Toowoomba Region, Queensland, Australia. It was built in 1954, Block B. It was added to the Queensland Heritage Register on 19 August 2016.

== History ==
Harristown State High School (SHS) opened on its present site in 1955, due to post-World War II (WWII) growth in the population of Toowoomba and its suburb of Harristown. As at 2016, Harristown SHS retains seven buildings initially constructed during 1954–1961, some with later extensions. These include:

- Block B (timber school building with timber floor trusses, 1954)
- Block L (former manual training timber vocational building, 1955, extended c. 1957, 1959)
- Block K (former domestic science timber vocational building, 1955, extended 1963, 1972)
- the northern section of the administration block (1957–1958)
- Block C (timber school building with open web steel floor trusses, 1959–1960)
- an Oslo lunch canteen (1959)
- Block D (timber school building with open web steel floor trusses, 1961)

The school also retains its:

- 1950s site planning
- covered links between the administration block and Blocks B and C, and between Blocks B, K and L
- early brick or concrete flower boxes adjacent to the administration block, and Blocks B, C and K
- curved driveway from South Street and pedestrian gates from Hennessy Street
- sports oval; tennis courts; northern playing fields; and mature trees.

The school has been in continuous operation since establishment.

The establishment and growth of Harristown SHS is a direct result of the growth of Toowoomba, Queensland's largest inland city. European settlement of the Toowoomba area, traditional country of the Giabal and Jarowair people, commenced in 1840 when squatters occupied pastoral runs on the Darling Downs. At the junction of two routes to Gorman's and Hodgson's gaps through the Main Range, the small settlement of Drayton evolved from 1842 as a stopping place for pastoralists and travellers. Six kilometres to its north-east was an area known as "The Swamp" – renamed Toowoomba by 1859 – which was first surveyed in 1849 as 12 suburban allotments of Drayton.

Toowoomba grew rapidly, due to its superior land and water supply, support from squatters and land speculators, and, from 1855, an easier route to Brisbane via the Toll Bar Road. Toowoomba was declared a municipality (the Borough of Toowoomba) in July 1860, and by the 1861 census it was clear that Toowoomba had eclipsed Drayton. The Main Line railway arrived in 1867 (connecting to Brisbane in 1876), and Toowoomba's economy diversified to include numerous small-scale manufacturing outlets, while the majority of administrative, service and other government and education functions for the surrounding region were centred on the town. Toowoomba was also popular as a summer retreat for the colony's elite. It was declared the City of Toowoomba in 1904.

Toowoomba was an early centre for education, with the first National School (later known as Toowoomba South State School) opening in 1865. National schools, established in 1848 in New South Wales, were continued in Queensland following the colony's separation in 1859. Following the introduction of the Education Act 1860, Queensland's national and public schools grew from four in 1860 to 230 by 1875. The State Education Act 1875 provided for free, compulsory and secular primary education and established the Department of Public Instruction. Schools became a community focus, a symbol of progress, and a source of pride, with enduring connections formed with past pupils, parents, and teachers.

To help ensure consistency and economy, the Queensland Government developed standard plans for its school buildings. From the 1860s until the 1960s, Queensland school buildings were predominantly timber-framed, an easy and cost-effective approach that also enabled the government to provide facilities in remote areas. Standard designs were continually refined in response to changing needs and educational philosophy and Queensland school buildings were particularly innovative in climate control, lighting, and ventilation. Standardisation produced distinctly similar schools across Queensland with complexes of typical components.

The first school in Harristown was a state school, located about 2 kilometres (1.2 mi) southwest of the centre of Toowoomba, opened in 1911, south of South Street (just southeast of the later SHS site). At this time Toowoomba's population was 10,636. Harristown had been established when subdivisions from the Harristown Estate were sold from 1902. Overcrowding at Harristown State School soon led to the opening of an open air annex building at the school in 1915, and the school was increased to five acres in size in 1919.

Harristown State School's enrolment continued to rise after WWII, increasing from 237 in 1947, when the school was already overcrowded, to 630 in 1960. This reflected Toowoomba's post-war population, which rose by 30% between 1947 and 1957, from 35,194 to 45,900. Toowoomba's municipal boundaries expanded; suburbs developed, and amenities and services increased. Growth in its primary and secondary industries also increased, construction projects provided a boom for the local building industry, and tourist numbers grew. Improvements to the Toowoomba central business district (CBD), delayed by WWII, began in earnest in the 1950s.

The Department of Public Instruction was largely unprepared for the enormous demand for state education that began in the late 1940s and continued well into the 1960s. This was a nationwide occurrence resulting from immigration and the unprecedented population growth now termed the "baby boom". Queensland schools were overcrowded and, to cope, many new buildings were constructed and existing buildings were extended.

In 1953, the Acting Head Teacher at Harristown State School reported to the Department of Public Instruction (renamed the Department of Education in 1957) that there was considerable building activity in the Harristown area; that more families were moving into the "Stephen St Hut area", as previous families moved out; and that "the greater part of the Harristown population consists of young families".

The Stephen Street Hut area was a former military camp. During WWII, two Australian defence facilities, 3 Advanced Ordnance Depot (AOD) and 6 Advanced Workshop (AEME), were established just east of the Gore Highway, to the northwest of the later site of Harristown SHS. The camp for 3 AOD (west of the Gore Highway) was occupied by squatters by 1947, while the Workshop camp's buildings (north of Stephens Street, northeast of the school site) were leased to the Queensland Housing Commission from about 1949 to 1954.

Post-war population growth, including the construction of Housing Commission homes in Harristown, not only impacted on the Harristown State School, but also led to a state high school being established opposite, to the north of South Street.

In Queensland, governments were slow to establish state secondary education, considering this to be of little relevance to Queensland's economy which was based on the primary industries. The Grammar Schools Act 1860 provided scholarships for high-achieving students to attend elite grammar schools, although few were awarded. It was not until 1912 that the government instituted a high school system, whereby separate high schools were established in major towns or, where the student population was too small, a primary school was expanded to include a "high top". High tops were an economical measure that provided essentially the same education while utilising already established facilities. In Queensland generally, high schools remained few in number until after WWII when secondary education was generally accepted as essential and was more widely provided for.

In the 1950s the number of high schools in Queensland increased significantly. In 1954 it was reported that high school enrolments had almost doubled since 1948, from 4500 to nearly 11,000. About 50 sites had been acquired, most with an area of 20 acres (8.1 ha), and by 1954 there were 30 state high schools.

Toowoomba State High School (est. 1919) was no longer sufficient for the city's secondary student population. In late 1954 Queensland's Education Minister, George Devries, noted that state high schools would open at Innisfail, Harristown, and Southport in 1955, as the "pressure of enrolments had made the establishment of high schools necessary at these three centres". At Toowoomba, "the technical and high school was now so large that it was necessary to establish a separate high school".

Reflecting the growth of suburbanisation and a move towards a decentralised population in urban centres, new high schools were located in suburban areas rather than the centre of town. The grounds were large, providing ample room for sports facilities. The general classroom buildings were the same standard types as used for primary schools but high schools also included purpose-built science laboratories, domestic science buildings, workshops for woodwork and metal work, libraries, and gymnasiums. These were also built to standard plans but were specific to their use and not a continuation of previous designs.

Additionally, there was a focus on the fit between the school and its neighbourhood, as well as site planning for expansion and ideal solar orientation. In the early 1950s, architects developed master planning concepts that influenced the design and layout of the whole school. Initially, these plans were broadly based on regular and symmetrical plan forms around a central or prominent axis. This concept was replaced a few years later by architects planning for growth and change. There was a shift away from grid-like layouts to organic layouts. Nuclear plans were designed, centred on a reception building with classroom wings connected to and fanning away from the nucleus. The primary focus was the ideal solar orientation of buildings. Interest was also shown in developing schemes that related to the natural contours and existing vegetation. Unlike the more formal and symmetrical plans of previous periods, new plans were developed that tended to be asymmetrical and more open. The long, narrow buildings were positioned so that the spaces captured between them were triangular, opening out into the landscape. The layout of Harristown SHS appears to have been organic in form, from the beginning.

The Harristown SHS site was reserved c. 1950, and included 21 acres (8.5 ha) of land east of Hennessy Street, between South Street in the South, and Stephens Street in the north. This school reserve, Portion 907 (R1014), absorbed a surveyed road (Rivett Street). A neighbouring 6.6 acres (2.7 ha) to the west was purchased by the Secretary for Public Instruction in 1950, forming the current 27.6 acres (11.2 ha) grounds. Just west of the SHS site was "Redlands", a brick residence built in 1889 on 28 acres (11 ha) for Edmund Wilcox. This land had been dedicated as Concordia Lutheran College, a co-educational Lutheran Boarding School, in 1946.

The construction of Harristown SHS was approved in September 1954, at a cost of £44,014, and the first building (called Block B in 2016) was ready for the start of the 1955 school year. Although a July 1954 site plan of the school shows an administration block to the west of four school buildings (three of them grouped around an assembly area), a curved access driveway from South Street, a sports oval, and four tennis courts, in May 1955 Block B was still the only building on the bare school grounds, and the oval was not yet formed. The 1954 site plan also shows an "existing flagpole", just north of where Block B would be built.

From 1950 the Department of Public Instruction introduced and developed new standard plans for school buildings. These buildings were high-set timber-framed structures and the understorey was used as covered play space. Introduced in 1950, the principal type (F/T4) was a long and narrow building with a gable roof. A semi-enclosed stair connected the understorey to a north facing verandah running the length of the building. Classrooms opened off the verandah and had extensive areas of windows; almost the entirety of the verandah wall and the opposite classroom wall were glazed, allowing abundant natural light and ventilation. This type was the most commonly constructed in the 1950s in Queensland.

In 1954 the type was improved by replacing the proliferation of stumps in the understorey with a timber truss that spanned the width of the classroom and provided an unimpeded play space. This concept was further refined in 1957 by replacing the timber truss with a steel open-web joist that spanned further and removed more understorey stumps. This structural system was employed with reinforced concrete piers to support large loads at minimal costs. This was further refined in 1959 by replacing the concrete piers and open-web joist with a steel portal frame that was employed extensively in the 1960s and 1970s.

Block B was a timber school building with timber floor trusses. This type, built from 1954 to 1960, was highset with either 21-or-24-foot-wide (6.4 or 7.3 m) classrooms, and often had clerestory windows above the verandah wall. Their timber-framed floor trusses provided play space underneath the building.

Block B initially included (from the east end, ground floor) a science lecture room; a store and science store; a science laboratory; an open student recreation area; a cleaner's room, switch room, and girls lavatory; and a boys locker room, boys lavatory, and a staff lavatory. On the upper floor (from the east) was a commercial room 32 by 24 feet (9.8 by 7.3 m), together with four 24-foot-square (7.3 m) classrooms with folding partitions between them. Two temporary staff rooms with temporary partitions occupied a fifth classroom space, and at the west end of the building there was a temporary principal's office and waiting space, occupying a future cloak room, 24 by 12 feet (7.3 by 3.7 m). An 8-foot (2.4 m) verandah ran along the northern side of the building, with enclosed hat and bag racks, and stairs at each end; the west end stairs were enclosed with brick and glass, while the stairs at the east end were temporary. There were centre-pivoting clerestory windows between the northern verandah roof and the eaves; and probably louvre windows in the verandah wall. The southern windows were either centre-pivoting or awning (top-hung) windows.

Harristown SHS soon included manual training and domestic science wings. Vocational education was a Queensland Government priority to support the development of primary industries; and after World War I this led to the establishment of a variety of subjects. Vocational training within primary education began in 1895 with drawing classes and expanded to include domestic sciences, agriculture, and sheet metal and wood working classes. The subjects required a variety of purpose-built facilities and were initially gender segregated. Standard, purpose-designed vocational buildings were first introduced in 1928. In 1936 the Minister for Education permitted students to take vocational subjects in lieu of geography or history in the Junior Examination, increasing the subjects' popularity.

Two timber vocational buildings were constructed at Harristown SHS in 1955. This type, built 1954–55, was usually highset on timber or concrete stumps, with a verandah, and was externally clad in chamferboards. Both buildings were located to the east of Block B, almost at right angles to the earlier building.

The first to be constructed was the manual training block (Block L in 2016), northeast of Block B. Block L was highset on ground sloping down to the north, with brick walls to the east and south sides of the undercroft. Large banks of centre-pivoting and awning windows on the east side were sheltered under strutted eaves. There was a store and staff room in an 8-foot (2.4 m) section at the south end; then a sheet metal room 24 by 24 feet (7.3 by 7.3 m) and a woodwork room 32 by 24 feet (9.8 by 7.3 m). There was a 6.5-foot (2.0 m) wide verandah on the west side, and awning windows on the east side. Bike racks and a timber store were located under the west side of the building.

The domestic science block (Block K in 2016), was lowset on sloping ground, with brick walls to the east and north sides of the undercroft. Located southeast of Block B, it had a lecture room 24 by 20 feet (7.3 by 6.1 m) at the north end, a cookery room 24 by 20 feet (7.3 by 6.1 m), small dining, fitting and staff rooms in a 12-foot (3.7 m) bay and a dressmaking room 24 by 20 feet (7.3 by 6.1 m) at the south end. Blocks K and L were joined to the east end of Block B by a covered and paved area, with a flower box at the northeast corner of Block K. Around this time the present steps down from the first floor of the east end of Block B were added, enclosed in brick and glass with a flower box to the north. There was a 6.5-foot (2.0 m) verandah along the west side of Block K, to which awning windows (not extant in 2016) were added c. 1957, between the verandah posts.

Harristown's new administration block was a result of growth at the school, "where an administrative unit of this pleasing character [had] become necessary". The administration block (the northern section of Block Z in 2016) was added to the west of Block B c. 1957-8. Connected to the northwest corner of the ground floor of Block B by a covered way, it included concrete paved indoor-outdoor areas; a raised concrete dais and a garden plot to the northeast; male and female toilets at the east end of the building; two staff rooms to the west; offices for the Principal and Deputy Principal at the west end of the building; and two brick flower boxes and a raised area of concrete pavers outside the northwest entrance. The building was sheeted with metal, with stone feature walls at the southwest corner and a brick wall at the east end, and had clerestory windows on the south side. The use of stone was a deliberate move to improve the aesthetics of the school. In 1959 it was noted that, as high schools grew, they needed "elements of maturity", the aim being "to develop pride in the school and to supplement academic education with desirable aesthetic experience".

The school continued to grow, requiring additions in the late 1950s. A new 24-by-24-foot (7.3 by 7.3 m) classroom was added to the north end of the manual training timber vocational building, Block L, in 1957; along with bike racks underneath. Stairs at the north end of the verandah descended in front of the temporary masonite sheeted wall used at the north end of the block. Although floor plans at this time showed two additional rooms, the second (northernmost) room was not built until 1959.

A new classroom wing (Block C in 2016) was also constructed c.1959–60, set at an angle to, and north of, Block B and an assembly area. Block C was a timber school building with open web steel floor trusses. This type, built 1957–60, was highset and timber-framed, with classrooms either 24 feet (7.3 m) square or 24 by 21 feet (7.3 by 6.4 m). Like the timber floor trusses on earlier buildings, the open web steel floor trusses provided unimpeded space at ground level. Timber awning windows were used extensively on southern walls, with louvres to the verandah wall (at Harristown, double-hung sash windows were used in the verandah wall instead). External cladding was chamferboards.

When completed, the ground floor of Block C included: a store under the stairs (which were enclosed with brick and wired glass, with a flower box to the north) at the eastern end of the building; girls toilet and locker room; store and staff toilet; covered recreation and assembly area; and a dais (raised area) at the west end. There was also seating set around the perimeter of the open areas. The upper floor, from the east, included: a physics lab 32 by 18 feet (9.8 by 5.5 m), cloakroom and store, a physics lecture room 24 feet (7.3 m) square; then five 24-foot (7.3 m) square classrooms. A 6.5-foot (2.0 m) verandah ran along most of the north side, excluding the east end. The upper floor was supported on open web steel trusses and lozenge-shaped reinforced concrete columns; and brick walls were used at the ends of the building, for parts of the ground floor, and for enclosing the stairs; with metal cladding elsewhere. There were awning windows on the south side, double-hung sash windows to the northern verandah, and clerestory windows above the verandah roof. Block C appears to have been built in two stages: the western four classrooms first, with the remainder added c. 1960.

The manual training timber vocational building, Block L, was also extended to the north in 1959, with a new 24-foot (7.3 m) square classroom; and concrete steps and a flower box (latter not extant 2016) were added at the north end of the verandah. In the same year a new section of covered walkway was constructed between the administration block and the west end of Block C, with the addition of a health services room at the west end of the upper floor of Block C, west of the stairs; and an Oslo lunch canteen to the south of, and separate from, the southwest corner of the ground floor of Block C. The lunch canteen was initially built with three half-height brick walls (being open to the north) with fixed wired glass windows over (to the west, south and east) and the north side has since been enclosed.

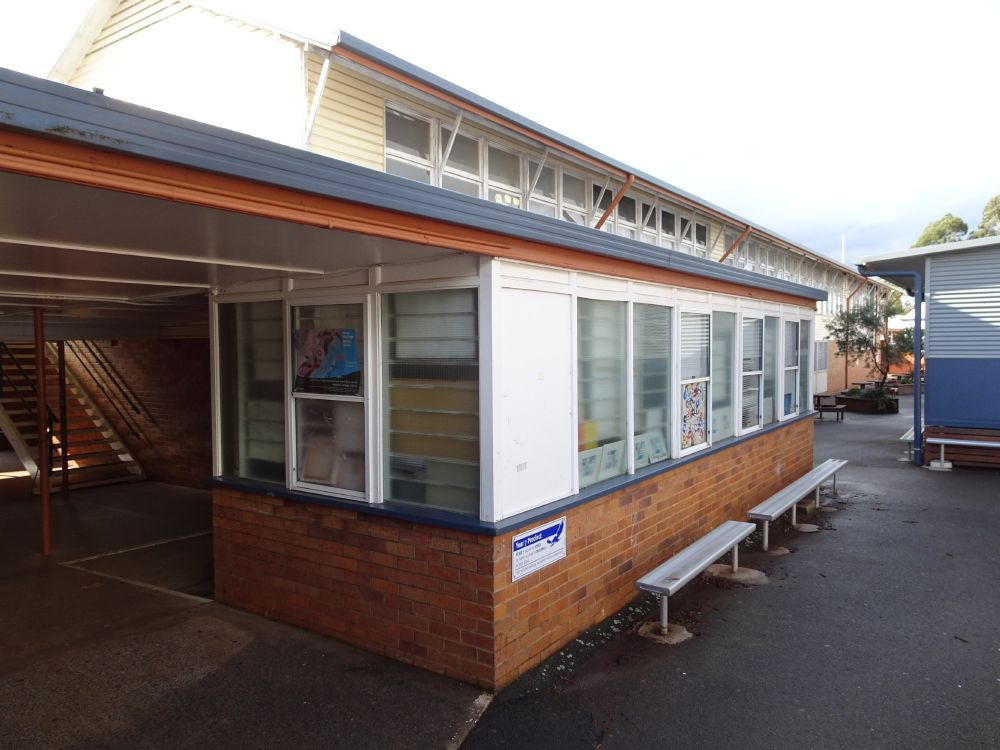
Former Oslo lunch canteen near southwest corner of Block C

Oslo canteens offered healthy lunches, based on the Norwegian nutritious lunch movement. A trial of the "Oslo lunch" in a Victorian school in 1940 found that the lunch, which included a salad sandwich on wholemeal bread, a bottle of milk and a piece of fruit, helped children gain weight, increased their energy, and assisted the healing of minor wounds. The program soon spread around Australia.

In 1961 the complex of school buildings was extended further north with the addition of another timber school building with open web steel floor trusses (Block D in 2016), north of, and connected by a covered walkway to, Block C. Block D had two floors, with brick end walls and metal wall cladding. The ground floor included open space around a tuckshop; with a library and library work room to the east; and toilets, cleaners rooms and stairwells at each end. The first floor had four classrooms in the middle, with store rooms, staff rooms, locker rooms and stairwells at each end. By 1961 the oval had been formed west of the school buildings, and basketball courts constructed south of the oval.

Harristown SHS needed more room in the 1960s, especially since Grade 8 students were transferred to Queensland high schools for the 1964 school year. A number of new buildings and additions were thus constructed in 1963. An additional classroom block (Block A in 2016) was constructed south of Block B; a new manual training block (Block M in 2016) was added north of Block L; and the domestic science timber vocational building, Block K, was extended to the south - two new dressmaking rooms were added, and the existing southern (dressmaking) classroom was reconfigured with new partitions, to incorporate the north end of a new classroom and a new fitting room, store and staffroom. The existing cookery room was extended to the south, and a laundry was created on the site of the old dining room. A new covered way linked Block K to Block A.

A two-storey science block (Block H in 2016) followed c. 1965, to the west of Blocks C and D, although it was not present in a July 1965 aerial photograph. The latter showed the school had seven blocks (Blocks A, B, C, D, K, L and M) by mid-1965, plus the administration block. Five rows of long, narrow structures, north of a vehicle entrance from Hennessy Street to the north of Block M, were probably bicycle sheds.

The school grounds had also been developed by 1965. The oval had tennis courts to the north (extant 2016) and basketball courts (not extant in 2016) to the south. There were also gardens and/or paths between Hennessy Street and the link between Blocks K and L. There was a pedestrian gate to Hennessy Street in this vicinity, marked on a 1972 plan, and two brick piers survive in 2016. Just north of the brick piers, there is another pedestrian gateway in 2016, with a metal archway reading "Harristown State High School", mounted on concrete plinths.

The school grounds also included shade trees. By 1965 there were trees planted either side of the curved driveway from South Street; along South Street east of the driveway; south of Block A; in a line heading southeast from the south end of K Block; and north along Hennessy Street from South Street. Trees were also planted along the street frontage west of the South Street entrance driveway by 1971.

Harristown SHS continued to expand from the late 1960s, with a new classroom block (the west end of Block E in 2016) built in 1966, and extended to the east in 1969. An assembly hall (Block G in 2016) was also built c. 1967. A library (Block J in 2016) was constructed, south of Block A, in 1970–1.

By 1971, when the population of Toowoomba was 59,524, the ground floor of Block B included two classrooms in the former open student recreation area. The western central staff room of the administration block was divided into a typist room and store area. Block C's ground floor covered recreation area and assembly area was enclosed for a TV room at the west end, a projection room, then a "temporary only" girls locker room at the east end; while the western dais was "temporary only" boys lockers.

The domestic science timber vocational building, Block K, was extended in 1972, again to south, with a new dressmaking room, plus two fitting rooms and a storeroom. The northern dressmaking room in the 1963 extension was converted into a cookery room, and a new partition was added to form a dining room south of the cookery room in the 1955 section of block. A toilet block (Block F in 2016) was constructed north of Block E between 1972 and 1974, and the school's three northern sports fields and embankments were also formed c. 1974. A music centre (Block N in 2016) was constructed southwest of the administration block c. 1979; and the administration block was extended to the south c. 1985, with changes to its original room configuration occurring at this time.

Although more buildings have since been added to the school, the complex of 1954–61 buildings with later extensions remains at the core of the school. In 2016, Harristown SHS continues to operate from its original site on South Street. The school is important to the area as a focus for the community, and generations of students have been taught there. With over 1500 students, it is the largest secondary school on the Darling Downs.

As Harristown State High School is located inland, architects at Towill Design Group and builders at FKG Group and Honeywill Consulting understood that enabling cross-flow ventilation was a crucial component of the brief. This building presents itself as a keystone for the campus' front of house facilities, ideal for its corner setting providing connection and street presence for the school. This was a major factor in why louvre windows were specified throughout the building. With extra large spans, louvres allowed for 83.4% free flow air. The inclusion of these hybrid louvres also matched with the school's contemporary design and its surrounding landscaping.

== Description ==
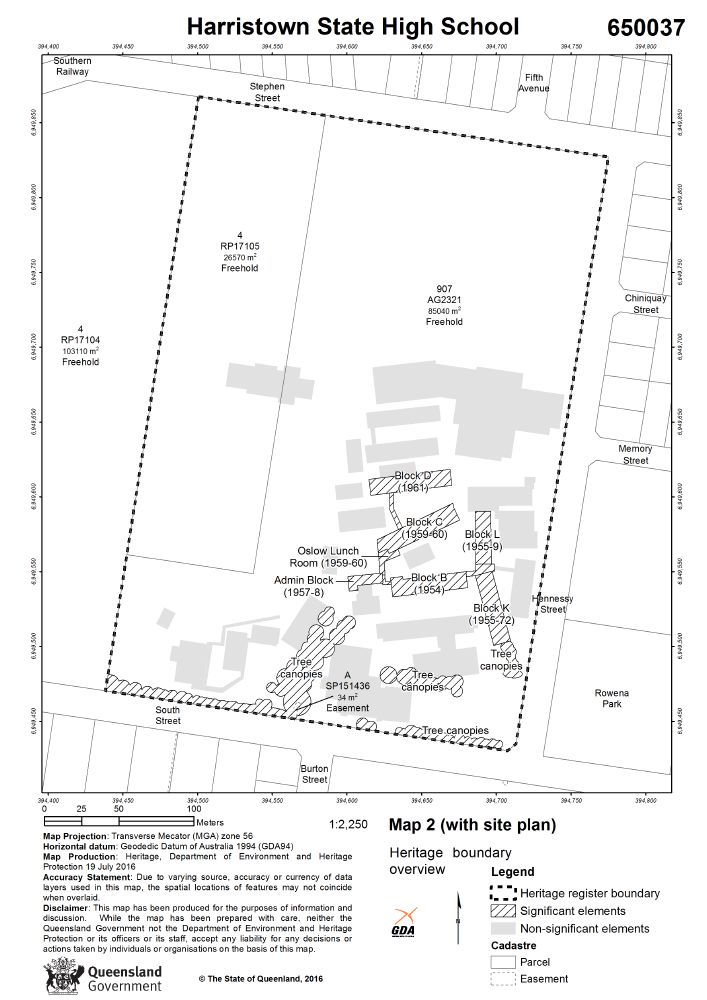
Site map, 2016

Harristown State High School occupies an 11.16 hectares (27.6 acres) rectangular site that is located in the suburb of Harristown, on the western edge of Toowoomba. The site slopes gently down towards the north, and is accessed by a slightly curved driveway leading from South Street at the southern end of the site. The site is also accessed by Hennessy Street (east) and is bounded by Stephen Street (north) and Concordia Lutheran College (west). The school retains a complex of seven buildings (1954–1961, some with later extensions) linked by covered walkways, with courtyard assembly and play spaces between the buildings, located in the southeastern corner of the site. The landscaped grounds are well established, and include mature trees, and playing fields at the western and northern ends of the site.

The seven significant buildings within the school complex are:

- a 1957–58 administration block (northern section) at the head of the entrance driveway
- Block B – a 1954 timber school building with timber floor trusses, axially aligned and east of the administration block
- Block C – a 1959–60 timber school building with open web steel floor trusses, northeast of the administration block
- 1959 Oslo lunch canteen, near the southwest corner of Block C
- Block K – 1955 (extended 1963 and 1972) timber vocational building (former domestic science)
- Block L – a 1955 (extended c. 1957, 1959) timber vocational building (former manual training), perpendicular and northeast of Block B.
- Block D – a 1961 timber school building with Open Web Floor Trusses.

Evidence of early site planning of the school grounds remains and is typical of Queensland schools during the 1950s, with splayed, long and narrow buildings linked around courtyard play spaces and centralised around a nucleus. Blocks B, C, D and the administration block are arranged in a staggered, approximately parallel and axially east–west formation, and Blocks K and L are approximately perpendicular to Block B on a north–south axis. The covered links between the administration block and the west ends of Blocks B and C, and between the east end of Block B and Blocks K and L, are also evidence of early site planning.

With the exception of the administration block and Oslo lunch canteen, the blocks are long, timber and brick buildings with profiled metal-clad gable roofs. Most external walls are clad in timber chamferboards, with some featuring face brick end walls, and face brick and glazed stair enclosures. Most soffits are lined in flat sheeting with rounded cover strips, and all bag racks are timber-framed with profiled metal exterior cladding. All metal-framed windows are modern and are not of cultural heritage significance.

=== Administration block ===
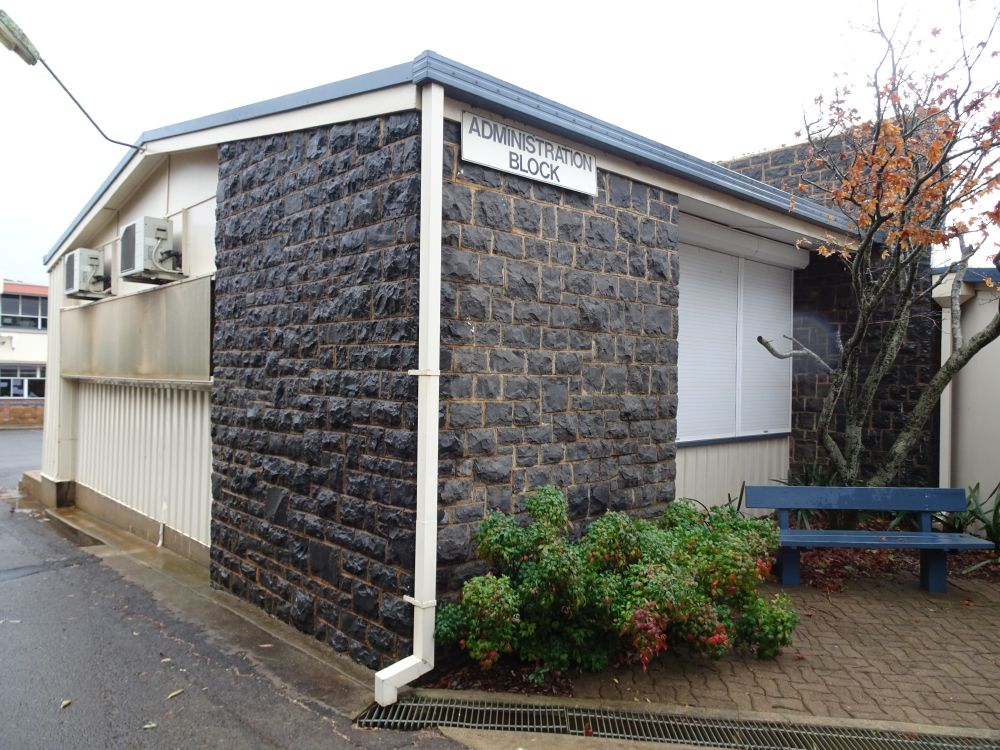
Stone walls at southwest corner of original administration block

The administration block is a lowset, single-story, timber-framed and masonry structure that is sheltered by a low-pitch gable roof clad in profiled metal sheeting. The building consists of two wings: the original, 1957–58 wing to the north; and a later, c. 1985-6 wing to the south (the southern wing is not of cultural heritage significance). The exterior of the northern wing is generally clad in metal sheets, with stone walls featured in the southwestern corner and a facebrick feature wall forming the eastern elevation. Original angled concrete steps, concrete pavers and two face brick flower-boxes have been retained in the northwestern corner of the building, and a concrete garden plot survives east of the building, south of a raised concrete slab.

The original open-plan internal layout of the northern wing is discernible, although lightweight partitions now enclose some of the former circulation and waiting areas. The wing is accessed via two internal corridors: one that runs along the southern edge of the wing, and another, separated by an exposed stone wall, that runs north–south at the western end of the building. The southern corridor has been extended to the west through an opening cut in the stone wall. Opening off the southern corridor are eastern toilets and a cleaner's room, a central (eastern) sick bay, a central (western) office space and a western printing room. Two office spaces are located west of, and modern walls enclose an office to the east of, the western corridor. Interior walls and ceilings are lined in flat sheeting and plaster, with the exception of the exposed stone walls. Modern carpet and linoleum lining the floors and modern cabinetry are not of cultural heritage significance.

Windows retained in the building include timber-framed awnings and louvres. All doors are modern replacements; with the southern location of the door to the southern toilet moved to the west (the original location is identifiable through retained framing).

=== Timber school building (Block B) ===
The timber school building with timber floor trusses (Block B) is a two-storey building that has north-facing verandahs and a timber floor truss system supporting the first floor. Western and eastern timber stairs provide access to the first-floor verandah. The chamferboards are vented at the apex of the gable-end walls and face brick walls enclose the ground floor western amenities (now rendered on the northern face) and ground-floor portion of the western stair. The southern eaves are supported by timber brackets. The stairs are enclosed in large, timber-framed screens of fixed and wired glazing - the eastern stair has been relocated from its original position, and has a brick flower box to its north.

The verandah has a low-pitched roof that is set below clerestory windows and is supported by continuous (ground to ceiling) timber posts. The ground floor verandah has a concrete slab floor and a flat, profiled metal ceiling; while the first floor verandah has a timber floor and a ceiling lined in flat sheeting with rounded cover strips and raked at a low angle. Bag racks form the northern balustrade, with timber three-rail balustrades located adjacent to the stairs.

The interior of the first floor is divided into six classrooms with a narrow office at the western end. The ground floor comprises western amenities, eastern classrooms with dividing store rooms, and central classrooms (enclosing a former open recreation area). The walls and ceilings of most classrooms are lined in flat sheeting with rounded cover strips, and timber portal trusses are visible within the ground floor spaces. Modern carpet, tile and linoleum floor linings are not of cultural heritage significance.

Timber joinery has been retained throughout the building, including banks of timber-framed, top-hung awning windows with centre-pivoting fanlights to the south; half-glazed and panelled timber doors within classrooms, and V-jointed (VJ) timber board-lined interior doors within the bathrooms. Most northern windows remain in the same location, but are modern replacements and most louvres on the ground floor north wall have been replaced with fixed lights (marks within the timber frame indicate the original fixed-louvre configuration). All verandah doors and most verandah windows are modern replacements and door openings between the central classrooms on the first floor have been enclosed with flat sheeting (timber framing indicates their former locations). An early laboratory teaching desk is retained in the easternmost ground floor classroom, and early metal pendant lights are located in the easternmost first floor classroom. Some classrooms also retain cupboards with sloping whiteboards above.

=== Timber school building (Block C) ===
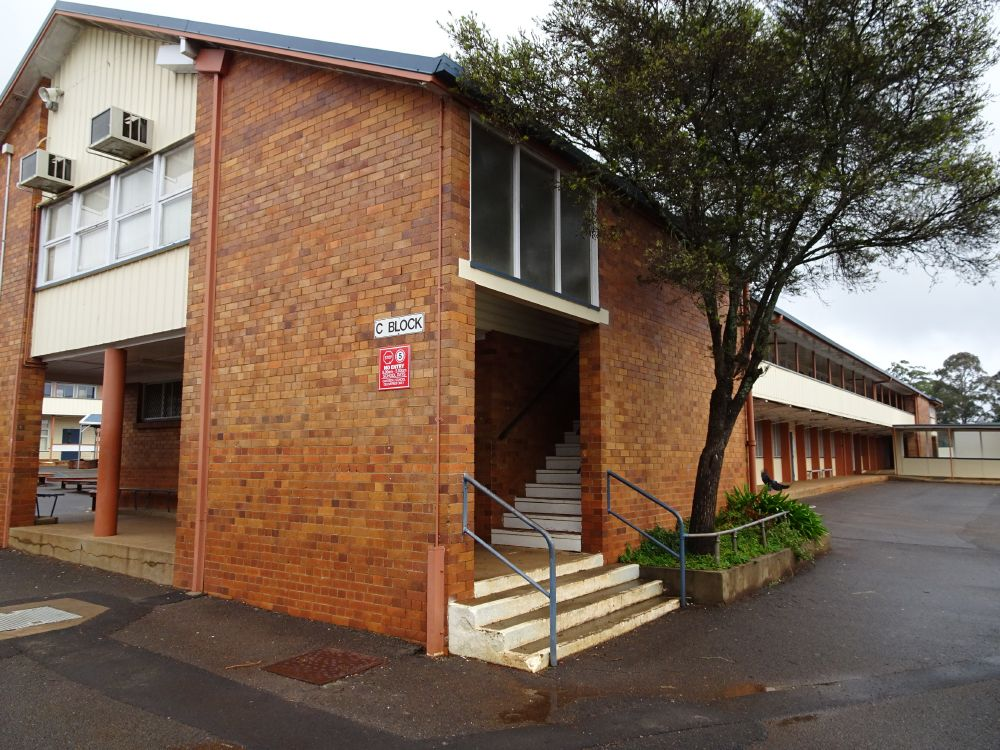
Block C, northeast corner

The timber school building with open web steel floor trusses (Block C) features face brick and profiled metal-clad end walls, and an open web steel floor truss system supported on lozenge-shaped, concrete columns. The ground floor spaces and stairs at the eastern and western ends are enclosed by face brick walls and the southern eaves are supported by timber brackets. There is a concrete garden box north of the eastern stairs. The building's verandahs face northwest, and the masonry addition that connects to the western end of the first-floor verandah is not of cultural heritage significance.

The verandah has a low-pitched roof set below clerestory windows; with the ground floor verandah featuring a concrete slab floor rising in height at the western end, a profiled metal-clad ceiling, and exposed cantilevered trusses. The first-floor verandah has circular metal posts, flat sheet-lined ceilings and bag racks that form the balustrade.

The first floor contains six classrooms separated from a larger eastern classroom by a narrow store. The ground floor interior comprises eastern amenities, and a former recreation area to the west that is now enclosed to form a large storage and office space and a classroom. The floor-level of the storage and office space is set above the remainder of the floor, and the easternmost toilets have been converted to locker enclosures, with timber framing retained and indicating their original location. Most walls on the first floor are lined above dado level in flat sheets with rounded cover strips, below dado level in flat sheeting, and the ceilings are of plaster. The ground floor walls are generally face and painted brick or are lined in flat sheeting. Trusses are exposed in most ground level rooms, although some have been boxed in with plasterboard. The former Physics laboratory retains a timber-framed rolling blackboard.

Windows to the south and east are generally banks of timber-framed awning windows, with the southern windows including centre-pivoting fanlights, and those to the north are timber-framed double-hung sashes. The clerestory windows are timber-framed with centre-pivoting sashes, and windows to the amenities are timber-framed louvres. Timber half-glazed and panelled doors connecting the five westernmost classrooms and the two easternmost classrooms and store are retained. All doors to the verandah are modern replacements.

=== Oslo lunch canteen ===
The Oslo lunch canteen stands to the south of the west end of Block C. It is a small, rectangular building with southern, eastern and western walls of face brick below sill height and fixed, wired glazing above. The northern wall, including windows and doors, is an addition and is not of cultural heritage significance. All double-hung sashes and metal window grates are also modern.

The interior comprises a single room, with a ceiling lined in flat sheets with rounded cover-strips, and painted brick walls. The carpet floor lining is modern.

=== Former domestic science building (Block K) ===
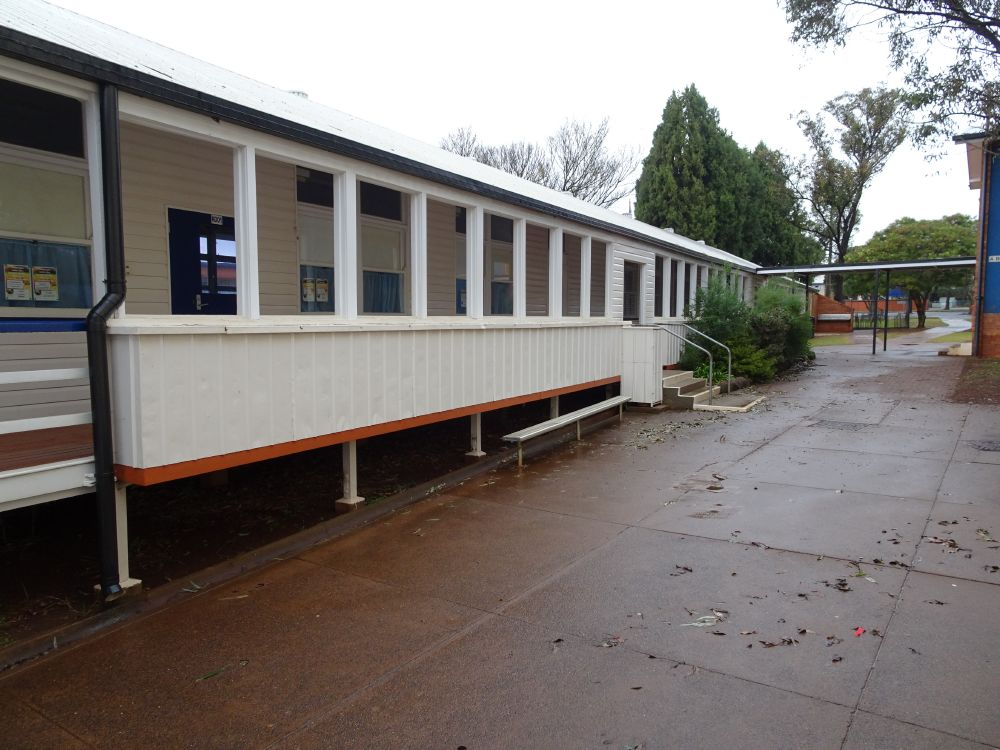
Block K (former domestic science), west side

The former domestic science timber vocational building (Block K) is a lowset, single-storey, timber-framed building with a western verandah. Its northern end-wall is clad in vertical timber weatherboards, the southern end-wall is facebrick, and the eastern eaves are supported by timber struts. The building is accessed via small timber and concrete stairs to the west and north and a modern concrete ramp to the southwest. There is a brick flower box on the northeast corner of the building.

The verandah has a raked ceiling lined in flat sheets with rounded cover strips, square timber posts and bag racks that form the balustrade. The floor is timber, with the exception of the southern end, which is of coloured concrete.

The interior comprises a northern classroom (formerly two): separated from a large, central domestic science (home economics, some dividing walls removed) room by a western store (with a small eastern extension); and two southern classrooms separated by three store rooms (two of which were formerly fitting rooms). The walls and ceilings of the northern classroom and domestic science room are plastered, while those in the southern classrooms are lined in flat sheeting. Some classrooms retain cupboards under sloping whiteboards. The southern wall of the southernmost classroom is face brick. Carpets and linoleum floor linings are modern and not of cultural heritage significance.

The eastern wall has a large, continuous bank of timber-framed awning windows with centre-pivoting fanlights; and the western wall contains timber-framed double-hung sashes with centre-pivoting fanlights. Doors throughout the building are modern replacements, with some verandah doors boarded over with flat sheeting.

=== Former manual training building (Block L) ===
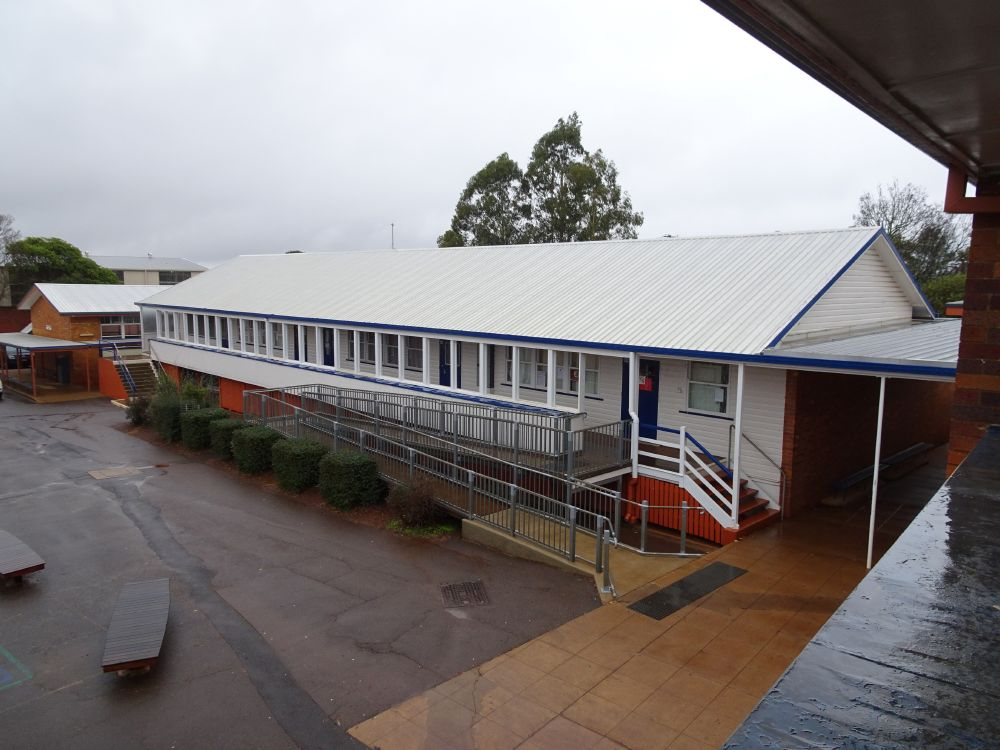
Block L, west side

The former manual training timber vocational building (Block L) is a highset, single-storey, timber-framed building that is set on concrete stumps, and has a western verandah. The southern wall is face brick and extends beyond the building and out to the east; and the eastern eaves are supported by timber struts. The understorey is used as storage space and is enclosed with rendered masonry walls and timber battening. Access to the building is via southern timber stairs, northwestern concrete stairs and a modern ramp at the southern end of the building (the ramp is not of cultural heritage significance).

The verandah has a timber floor, timber posts, balustrades formed by bag racks and a raked ceiling clad in flat sheeting. The northern end is enclosed in wired, fixed glazing.

The interior comprises four classrooms, with two store rooms connected to the southern side of the southern classroom. Doors connect the two southernmost and the two northernmost classrooms. All interior walls are lined in flat sheeting (the two southernmost classrooms have rounded cover strips). The ceilings of the two northern classrooms are of plaster and those in the southern classrooms are lined in flat sheeting with rounded cover strips. Most classrooms retain timber-framed rolling blackboards, or cupboards under sloping whiteboards.

The eastern wall has a large, continuous bank of timber-framed awning windows with centre-pivoting fanlights; and the western wall contains timber-framed double-hung sashes with centre-pivoting fanlights. The three northernmost classrooms retain early timber half glazed and panelled doors, with interior doors in a similar style also retained between classrooms. Panelled, high-waisted timber doors are also retained. Modern doors to the southern ends of the southernmost classrooms are recent replacements and are not significant.

=== Timber school building (Block D) ===
The timber school building with Metal Open Web Floor Trusses (Block D) is a long, two storey building with cantilevered metal open web floor trusses supported on rectangular concrete columns and a northern verandah. The eastern and western end walls and some ground floor enclosures are facebrick, with the remainder of the building's exterior clad in flat sheets and profiled metal. Concrete stairs, located at the eastern and western ends of the building, provide access to the first-floor verandah and classrooms and have metal handrails.

The first floor verandah has a timber floor, square timber posts and bag racks that form a balustrade; while the ground floor verandah has a concrete slab floor, profiled metal ceiling, circular metal posts and bag racks. The first-floor verandah walls are of recent flat sheeting.

The first floor contains three (formerly four; wall removed) central classrooms, with store and staff rooms to the east and west. Walls have been added to the central classroom to form a storeroom; and a wall has been added to one of the eastern storerooms to form two spaces. The ground floor comprises a central storeroom, classroom and tuckshop, with eastern and western toilets, and storerooms located south of the stairwells. A brick wall has been removed from the classroom space, and a modern partition has been added at the eastern end to form an additional store room. A recent wall also extends the tuckshop to the north. Interior walls are generally line with flat sheets with rounded cover strips and plaster. Facebrick walls are exposed in the stairwells and amenities. Floor trusses have been boxed over with plasterboard in some ground floor spaces.

The first floor retains some early panelled and half-glazed timber doors to the verandah, although most interior door openings have been boarded over or are modern replacements. Some timber-framed louvres and awnings have been retained in the southern elevation; although all fanlights and verandah windows are modern replacements.

=== Landscape elements ===
The school grounds are well established, with sporting facilities including a large oval, which is marked by a curved post and rail timber fence, west of the main school building complex; four early tennis courts to the north of the oval; and three playing fields at the north end of the school grounds.

The splayed open courtyard spaces between blocks B and C, and C and D, which were formed as part of the 1950s and early 1960s planning, are sealed in bitumen and are used as open play-space. Metal-framed shade structures with profiled metal roof cladding and concrete slab floors form covered connections between the significant school buildings.

A curved entrance driveway, running approximately northeast from the South Street school entrance to the administration block, is lined on either side by an avenue of established trees. Other mature trees, planted during the school's first 15 years of operation, are located along South Street; in an east–west line south of Block J; and in a line extending southeast from the end of Block K.

A decorative metal archway set on concrete plinths is located at the Hennessey Street entrance and features "HARRISTOWN STATE HIGH SCHOOL" in metal lettering. To the south of the archway are two brick piers at an older entrance.

== Heritage listing ==
Harristown State High School was listed on the Queensland Heritage Register on 19 August 2016 having satisfied the following criteria.

The place is important in demonstrating the evolution or pattern of Queensland's history.

Harristown State High School (established in 1955) is important in demonstrating the evolution of state education and its associated architecture in Queensland. The place retains excellent, representative examples of standard government designs that were architectural responses to prevailing government educational philosophies, set in landscaped grounds with sporting facilities.

The layout of the administration and classroom blocks, the covered links between them and associated open spaces, reflect the early 1950s introduction of master planning, which provided for ordered growth from a nucleus.

The timber school building with timber floor trusses (1954) and the two timber school buildings with open web steel floor trusses (1959–60, and 1961) represent the evolution of Department of Public Works designs during the mid to late 1950s to allow for unimpeded play space under highset timber school buildings.

The former domestic science and manual training timber vocational buildings (both 1955) reflect the Queensland Government's focus on vocational training as a way of ensuring the state's economic prosperity.

The northern section of the administration block (1957–58) represents a move away from the austerity of the early 1950s to a more permanent aesthetic, incorporating masonry elements.

The Oslo lunch canteen (1959) is important surviving evidence of the spread of a Norwegian "healthy lunch" movement through Queensland's schools in the post-World War II (WWII) era.

The place is important in demonstrating the principal characteristics of a particular class of cultural places.

Harristown State High School is important in demonstrating the principal characteristics of a Queensland state high school of the 1950s. These include its 1950s site planning; range of highset and lowset timber-framed teaching buildings of standard and individual designs that incorporated understorey play areas, verandahs, and classrooms with high levels of natural light and ventilation; and a generous, landscaped site with mature shade trees and assembly and sports areas.

Following 1950s site planning principles, the school includes five classroom blocks that all contribute to the general concept of splayed, long, narrow buildings linked around open ended courtyard assembly and play spaces, fanning out from the administration block.

The ground level administration block, the covered links between it and Blocks B and C, and between Blocks B, K and L, and the courtyard spaces between the buildings, are characteristic of 1950s school design in Queensland.

The timber school building with timber floor trusses and the 1959–60 timber school building with open web steel floor trusses are both good, intact examples of their type and demonstrate two iterations of the Department of Public Work's standard designs: incorporating timber floor trusses for unimpeded play space under the classrooms, and later using steel trusses to achieve the same effect. Both buildings retain their: highset character with visible trusses under; large banks of south-facing timber-framed awning windows, with centre-pivoting fanlights; clerestory lighting above the northern verandah roof; and 24-foot (7.3 m) wide classrooms.

The former domestic science and manual training timber vocational buildings both retain their timber-framed construction, set on stumps, with verandahs.

The place has a strong or special association with a particular community or cultural group for social, cultural or spiritual reasons.

Schools have always played an important part in Queensland communities. They typically retain significant and enduring connections with former pupils, parents, and teachers; provide a venue for social interaction and volunteer work; and are a source of pride, symbolising local progress and aspirations.

Harristown State High School has a strong and ongoing association with the Harristown community. It was established in 1955 and generations of Harristown students have been taught there. The place is important for its contribution to the educational development of Harristown and as a focus for the community.

== See also ==
- History of state education in Queensland
- List of schools in Darling Downs
