= Toowoomba South =

Toowoomba South or South Toowoomba may refer to a number of things in Toowoomba, Queensland, Australia, including:

- Electoral district of Toowoomba South, an electorate in the Queensland Legislative Assembly
- South Toowoomba, Queensland, a suburb
- Toowoomba South State School, a former school and heritage-listed building
