= Bussian =

Bussian is a surname. Notable people with the surname include:

- Russell Bussian (born 1973), professional rugby league footballer
- Peter Bussian (born 1962), American filmmaker, photographer, and visual media consultant
