= Harristown, Queensland =

Harristown Toowoomba, Queensland
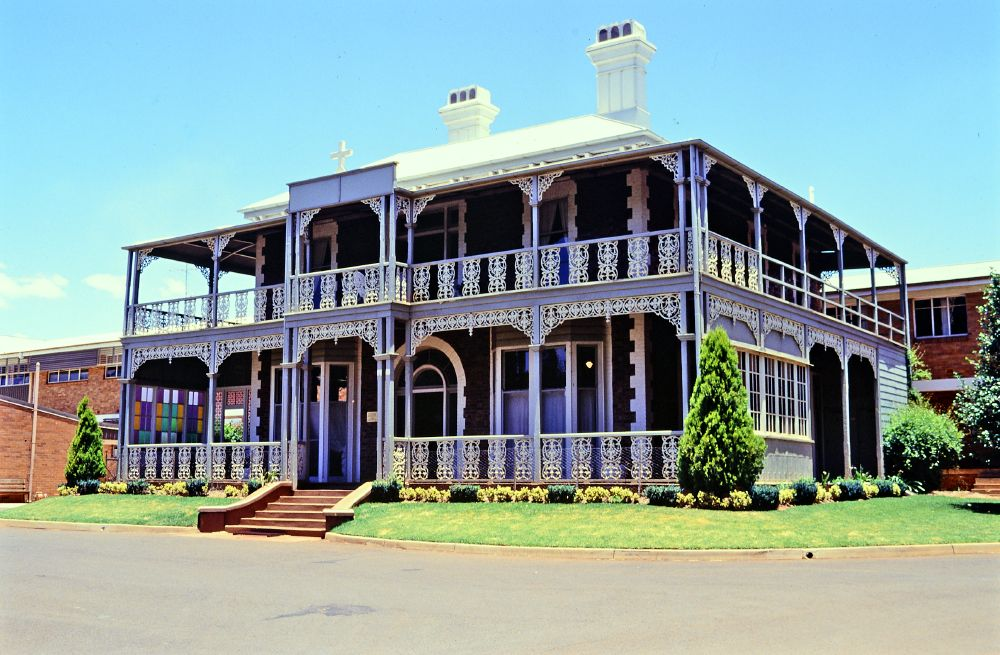
- Redlands, now Concordia Lutheran College Administration Centre, 1992

- Coordinates: 27.5777°S 151.9261°E
- Population: 9,081 (2021 census)
  - Density: 1,261/km^{2} (3,267/sq mi)
- Postcode(s): 4350
- Area: 7.2 km^{2} (2.8 sq mi)
- Time zone: AEST (UTC+10:00)
- Location: 4.4 km (3 mi) SW of Toowoomba CBD; 131 km (81 mi) W of Brisbane
- LGA(s): Toowoomba Region
- State electorate(s): Toowoomba South
- Federal division(s): Groom
Suburbs around Harristown:
Glenvale	Newtown	Toowoomba City
Glenvale	Harristown	South Toowoomba
Drayton	Darling Heights	Kearneys Spring

Harristown is a residential locality in Toowoomba in the Toowoomba Region, Queensland, Australia. In the 2021 census, Harristown had a population of 9,081 people.

== Geography ==
Harristown is located to the southwest of the Toowoomba city centre.

== History ==
The locality is named after George Harris (1831–1891), a Brisbane businessman and Member of the Queensland Legislative Council.

Originally in the Shire of Drayton, the locality was first opened as the Harristown Estate in 1902. The estate consisted of 177 building sites ranging from 16 to 34 perches (400 to 860 m^{2}). Forty blocks were sold at the auction.

Harristown State School opened on 4 September 1911 with 67 students. The official opening on Saturday 30 September 1911 was performed by the acting Secretary for Education Kenneth Grant, by which time the enrolment had already increased to 84 students.

From 1915 until 1993, the suburb had a functioning railway station on the Toowoomba–Wyreema line.

After World War II, the area boomed.

Although the need for Lutheran schooling in Toowoomba had been identified since 1926, the Great Depression followed by World War II prevented a school being established. Concordia Lutheran College opened on 17 February 1946 in the (now heritage-listed) house Redlands on a 25-acre (10 ha) site in Stephens Street with 27 students (23 of them being boarders). In 1964 a primary school campus opened nearby in Warwick Street with an initial 64 students. A second primary school campus (originally called Martin Luther Primary School) was established in 1977 in Hume Street, Centenary Heights.

St Anthony's Catholic Primary School was established in 1954 by the Presentation Sisters. The foundation stone was laid on 21 November 1954, which is a significant day for the sisters as their order celebrates the Feast of the Presentation of Mary in the Temple on 21 November each year. The first classroom was ready in February 1955 and by the end of 1955 there were 116 students enrolled. The Presentation Sisters ran the school until the first lay principal was appointed in 1985, although the sisters continued to teach in the school until the end of 1997.

Harristown State High School opened on 24 January 1955.

== Demographics ==
In the 2016 census, Harristown had a population of 8,555 people.

In the 2021 census, Harristown had a population of 9,081 people.

== Heritage listings ==
Harristown has a number of heritage-listed sites, including:

- Smithfield House, 8 Panda Street (27.5855°S 151.929°E)
- Drayton and Toowoomba Cemetery, corner of South Street and Anzac Avenue (27.5766°S 151.9195°E)
- Harristown State High School Buildings, 341–367 South Street
- Redlands (house), 154 Stephen Street (27.5722°S 151.9296°E)

== Education ==
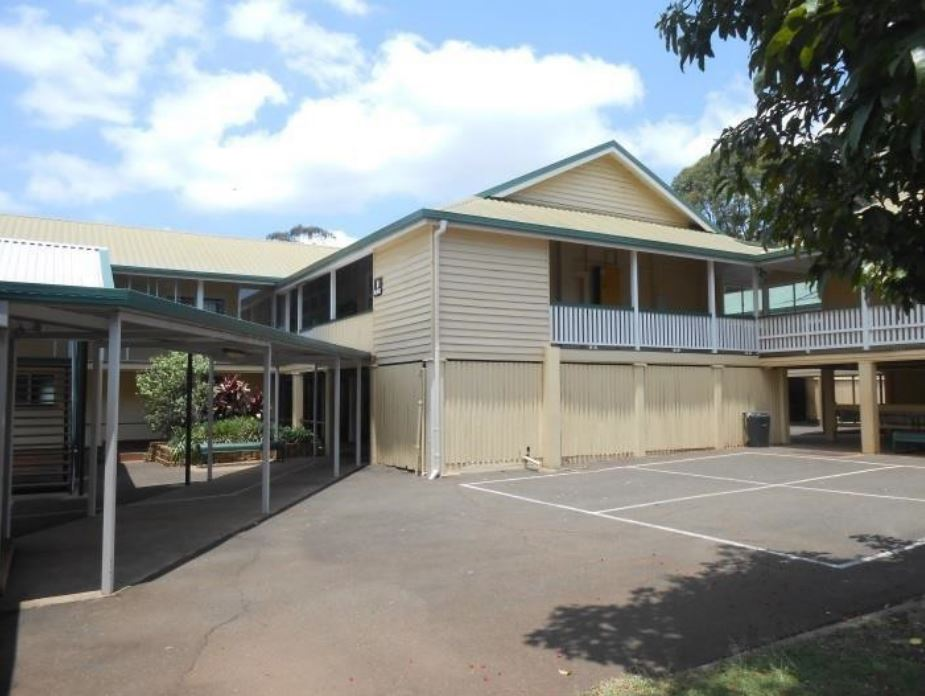
Harristown State School, 2025

Harristown State School is a government primary (Prep–6) school for boys and girls at 332 South Street (27.5752°S 151.9339°E). In 2017, the school had an enrolment of 397 students with 34 teachers (28 full-time equivalent) and 32 non-teaching staff (21 full-time equivalent). It includes a special education program.

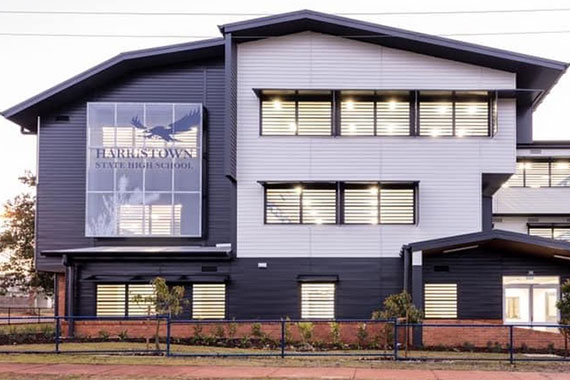
Harristown State High School, 2025

Harristown State High School is a government secondary (7–12) school for boys and girls at 341-367 South Street (27.5746°S 151.9317°E). In 2017, the school had an enrolment of 1,661 students with 142 teachers (130 full-time equivalent) and 57 non-teaching staff (46 full-time equivalent). It includes a special education program and an Intensive English program.

St Anthony's School is a Catholic primary (Prep–6) school for boys and girls at 9 Memory Street (27.5732°S 151.9356°E). In 2017, the school had an enrolment of 244 students with 18 teachers (14 full-time equivalent) and 11 non-teaching staff (7 full-time equivalent).

Concordia Lutheran College is a private primary and secondary school for boys and girls with its primary (Prep–6) campus at 67 Warwick Street (27.5755°S 151.9276°E) and its secondary (7–12) campus at 154 Stephen Street (27.5732°S 151.9299°E). In 2017, the school had an enrolment of 644 students with 68 teachers (48 full-time equivalent) and 75 non-teaching staff (45 full-time equivalent).

== Features ==
- Drayton and Toowoomba Cemetery
- Milne Bay Museum
- Elders and Landmark Saleyards
