= Edwin Godsall =

Edwin John Godsall
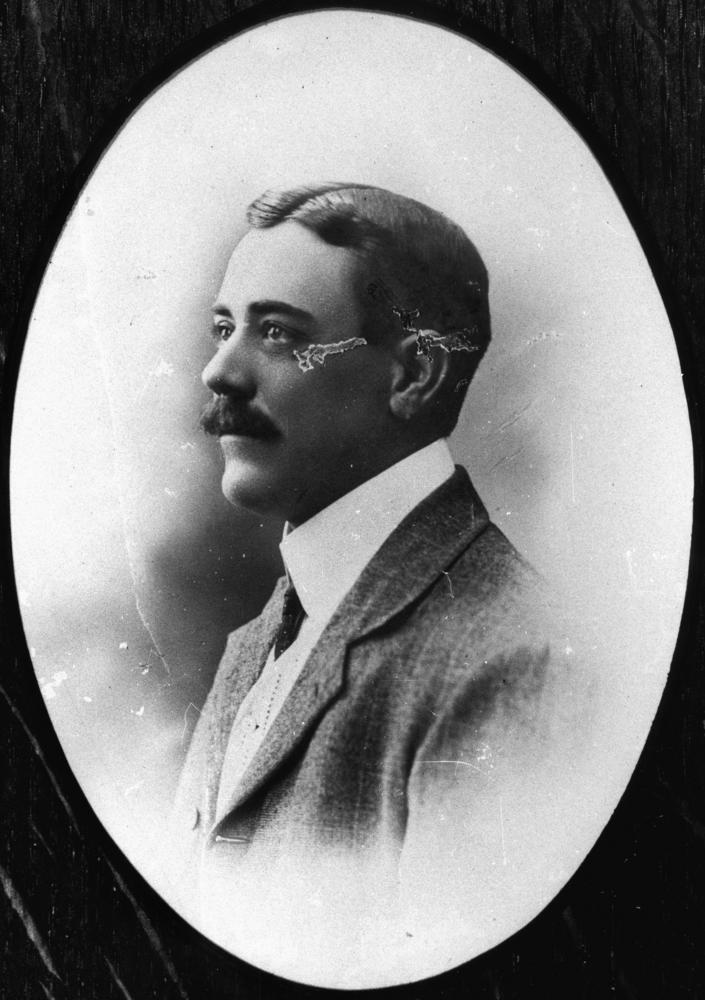
- Edwin John Godsall ca. 1906
- Born: 30 September 1871; Toowoomba, Queensland
- Died: 8 May 1941 (aged 69); Toowoomba, Queensland
- Occupations: Stock & Station Agent

Edwin John Godsall (30 Sept 1871 – 8 May 1941) was a politician and mayor of the City of Toowoomba, Queensland. Born in Toowoomba on 30 September 1871, he was educated at the Toowoomba South State School and Toowoomba Grammar School before going into banking. Later, he managed a stock and station agency before being elected to the City Council of Toowoomba in 1904 and then, from 1906 to 1907, served as mayor of Toowoomba. He died 8 May 1941.
