= Cottage (68 Stephen Street) =

Cottage, 68 Stephen Street
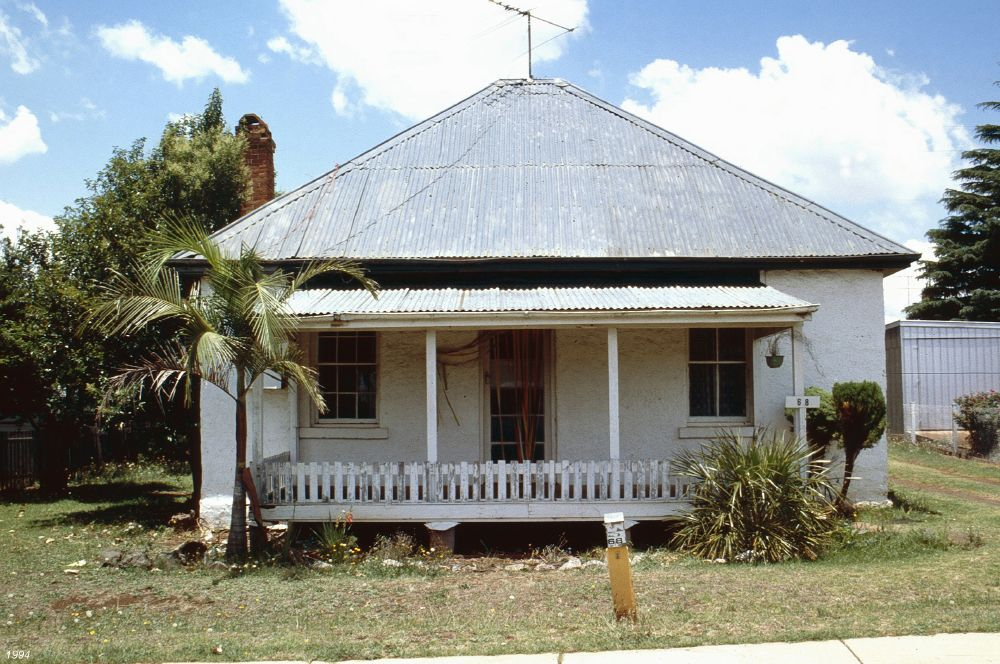
- Cottage, 1994

- Location within Queensland Location within Australia
- 27.5728°S 151.9427°E
- Location: 68 Stephen Street, South Toowoomba, Queensland, Australia

History
- Design period: 1840s–1860s (mid-19th century)
- Built: 1860s–1920s

Queensland Heritage Register
- Official name: Cottage (68 Stephen Street)
- Type: state heritage (built)
- Designated: 20 February 1995
- Reference no.: 601313
- Significant period: 1860s, 1910s–1920s (fabric); 1860s (historical)
- Significant components: extension/s or addition/s, residential accommodation – main house, furniture/fittings

68 Stephen Street is a heritage-listed cottage in South Toowoomba, Queensland, Australia. It is one of the earliest surviving dwellings in Toowoomba, the land having been part of one of the first subdivisions when the town was developed. It was built by the mid-1860s for Charles Taylor, who was described in his will as a "well-sinker", and was constructed using laterite, an uncommon material in Toowoomba buildings.

The building was originally recorded as being a single-storey four-room stone cottage. The original calico ceilings were lined in the 1910s and the exterior of the cottage was rendered at about this time. A new bathroom, and kitchen/dining area appears to have been added to the rear of the cottage during the 1920s. A toilet and laundry block has also been added at the rear of the cottage. It was added to the Queensland Heritage Register on 20 February 1995.

== History ==
Records indicate that this single-storeyed stone cottage was erected by the mid-1860s, replacing an earlier timber building. Erected on part of Portion 46, initially an area of 27 acres (11 ha) acquired by William Shuttlewood and Charles Taylor during the late 1850s, it survives as evidence of the development of Toowoomba from this time.

Settlement of the area commenced at Drayton in the early 1840s, Thomas Alford opening a general store in 1843. In the same year, residents of Drayton petitioned the Governor to form a township at Drayton, and a survey of the town was prepared in 1849. In laying out Drayton, Government Surveyor James Charles Burnett was also instructed to mark out suburban allotments for garden and agricultural purposes; his ideal site for the "Drayton Swamp Agricultural Reserve" was an area approximately three to four miles northeast of Drayton where two swampy creeks joined to form the headwaters of Gowrie Creek. The reason for Burnett's selection of this area has been attributed to an incident whereby Shuttlewood, a timber-getter then living in Drayton, was one of two men sent by William Horton to cut reeds from the nearby swamp, and who upon returning to Drayton, had gossiped ... about the potential of the area and been overheard by Burnett. The Agricultural Reserve included 12 allotments bounded by the left bank of the west swamp, and the present Bridge, West and Stephen streets.

Six of the 12 "Swamp allotments" were first offered at auction in November 1849, however not all the allotments were sold until 1853 at which time Shuttlewood acquired Suburban Allotment One (SA 1), the southernmost of the Swamp allotments. Further allotments at the Swamp were surveyed in 1856. Portion 46, described as a Suburban Farm, located parallel to, and on the southern side of Shuttlewood's SA 1, was acquired in July 1858 by Shuttlewood and Taylor.

By late 1857, the name "Toowoomba" had gradually taken over from "The Swamp", as the town continued to expand. At the time of its incorporation into a municipality in November 1860, Toowoomba had well outgrown Drayton. Shuttlewood appears to have been actively involved in the development of Toowoomba, in matters including the establishment of the boundaries of the town (possibly because his major land purchases were situated in the vicinity of the proposed southern boundary). In January 1861, Shuttlewood was one of nine aldermen elected to the first municipal council of Toowoomba. Following Shuttlewood's death in 1894, he was described as ...one of the first to arrive in Toowoomba and take up his residence here. From the earliest period of its existence he has known the town and has watched its growth and development. ... he took a very prominent interest in all pertaining to the welfare of the district.

Little is recorded about Taylor. He appears to have been acquiring land at The Swamp during the 1850s. In 1857, Taylor acquired from Shuttlewood, the western half (15 acres (6.1 ha)) of SA 1, opposite Portion 46. Taylor's name appears immediately below Shuttlewood's on a petition published in the local newspaper in 1859. Taylor's will described him as a well-sinker of Stephen Street.

Shuttlewood and Taylor entered into a Deed of Partition in November 1859, at which time Taylor acquired sub A of portion 46, the western portion of the allotment. Although there are no further references to Shuttlewood in the title documents pertaining to this land, rates records refer to Shuttlewood as the "owner" of the property until the mid-1860s during which period there appears to have been an earlier building on the land, described as a slab and shingle house.

Taylor took out a mortgage on the land in February 1866; according to the mortgage documents, the money was used to subdivide the land. Although money was taken for 26 of the 31 allotments auctioned in April that year, not all purchases were paid in full at that time. A deposit was paid on the allotment on which the cottage is located by James Jennings, whose name is recorded in the rate books for the property for 1868–69. Jennings however, does not appear to have ever paid the final balance due on the land.

A new building appears to have been erected by the late 1860s, at which time rates records refer to a four-room stone cottage. The stone used for the construction of the cottage has been identified as laterite, a reddish rock material rich in iron and aluminium oxides which is produced through the processes of weathering. Laterite, a soft and easily cut material when quarried, dries and hardens with exposure to the atmosphere, forming an extremely durable brick. Extensive deposits of Laterite, which typically occurs in humid, tropical conditions as well as some drier areas, are found in Toowoomba, including visible deposits at the top of the "Old Toll Bar Road" on the east escarpment of the Main Range. Although no comprehensive survey of stone buildings has been undertaken to establish how many, if any, other dwellings constructed of laterite are extant in Toowoomba, it is considered that this is an uncommon building in Toowoomba.

Taylor died in June 1866, and Samuel George Stephens and Thomas Perkins were appointed as Trustees. The resolution of Taylor's estate was a complex process, and was not finalised until 1902, when the estate was bought under the provisions of the Real Property Act. Rate records indicate continuing occupancy of the cottage during this period from the 1860s to the 1900s, although it is unclear as to the claim the persons being rated may have had on the property. Sale of the allotments on the estate commenced in 1903.

The allotment on which the cottage is located was acquired by Ellen Clubley in 1903, and has continued to change hands a number of times. The ceilings, originally calico, were lined during the early 1910s, and the exterior of the cottage was rendered at about this time. A new bathroom, and kitchen/dining area appears to have been added to the rear of the cottage during the 1920s. A toilet and laundry block has also been added at the rear of the cottage. (The cottage was acquired by the present owners in 1975).

== Description ==
68 Stephen Street, a small single-storeyed rendered laterite stone cottage with a steeply pitched hipped corrugated iron roof, is located fronting Stephen Street to the north.

The symmetrical northern street facade has a verandah with a corrugated iron skillion awning supported by timber posts, with a timber floor and batten balustrade. The central entry has a timber framed door with glass panels, and is flanked by a sash window to either side. There is a single brick chimney stack on the eastern side, and the building has timber sash windows with arched headers. The laterite stone has been rendered and painted, but the southwest corner wall exhibits evidence of stone coursing and the rough pitted surface of the laterite stone. The walls display large bulges and variation and texture. A timber addition is attached to the rear of the building, and consists of a corrugated iron gabled roofed structure with another timber free standing structure to the south.

Internally, the plan consists of four rooms with a central rear foyer. Walls are rendered and painted laterite stone, and display large bulges and variation in texture. The building has boarded ceilings, narrow skirtings, and doors have timber frames. The northeast room has a large fireplace with recessed storage boxes either side, and the floors consist of boards with carpet over.

The rear addition contains a kitchen and bathroom, with an early recessed stove and a terrazzo bath and basin. The walls and ceilings are lined with hardboard sheeting with timber cover strips. The rear structure contains a laundry and toilet.

A driveway is located on the western side of the house, accessing the rear of the property.

== Heritage listing ==
The Cottage at 68 Stephen Street was listed on the Queensland Heritage Register on 20 February 1995 having satisfied the following criteria.

The place is important in demonstrating the evolution or pattern of Queensland's history.

The cottage survives as one of the earliest dwellings in Toowoomba, and is important in demonstrating the evolution of Toowoomba from an agricultural reserve to an important municipal centre, from the 1850s.

The place demonstrates rare, uncommon or endangered aspects of Queensland's cultural heritage.

The stone building, an uncommon example of a Toowoomba dwelling constructed of laterite, also represents an unusual use of laterite as a building material in Queensland.

Located in one of Toowoomba's earliest residential subdivisions, the cottage is important in demonstrating unusual 1860s methods of design and construction and makes an aesthetic contribution to the Stephen Street streetscape.

The place is important because of its aesthetic significance.

Located in one of Toowoomba's earliest residential subdivisions, the cottage is important in demonstrating unusual 1860s methods of design and construction and makes an aesthetic contribution to the Stephen Street streetscape.
