= Redlands, Toowoomba =

Redlands
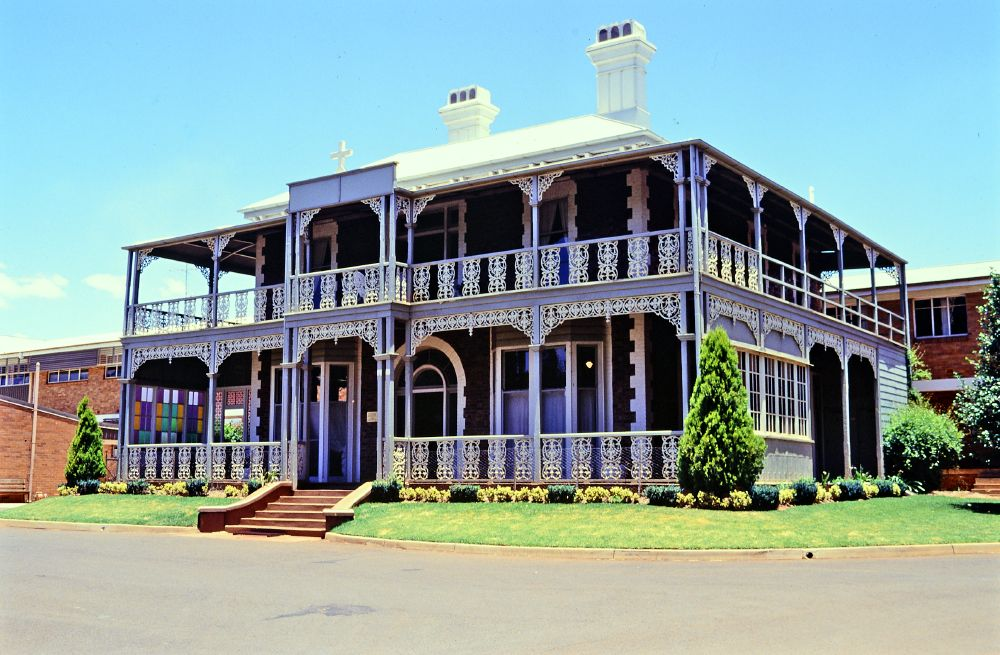
- Redlands, now Concordia Lutheran College Administration Centre, 1992

- Location within Queensland Location within Australia
- 27.5722°S 151.9296°E
- Location: 154 Stephen Street, Harristown, Toowoomba, Toowoomba Region, Queensland, Australia

History
- Design period: 1870s–1890s (late 19th century)
- Built: 1889–1930s circa
- Built for: Edmund Wilcox

Site notes
- Architect: James Marks

Queensland Heritage Register
- Official name: Concordia College Administration Centre, Redlands
- Type: state heritage (built, landscape)
- Designated: 21 October 1992
- Reference no.: 600869
- Significant period: 1880s–1910s (historical); 1880s–1930s? (fabric); 1940s– (social)
- Significant components: lead light/s, garden – bed/s, lawn/s, residential accommodation – main house, sports field/oval/playing field, tree groups – avenue of, carriage way/drive, garden/grounds

Redlands is a heritage-listed villa at 154 Stephen Street, Harristown, Toowoomba, Toowoomba Region, Queensland, Australia. It was designed by architect James Marks and built from 1889 to c. 1930. It is also known as the Administration Centre of Concordia Lutheran College. It was added to the Queensland Heritage Register on 21 October 1992.

== History ==
Redlands, a two-storeyed brick residence, was designed by Toowoomba architect James Marks and built by Henry Andrews in 1889 for Edmund Wilcox, a merchant and prominent citizen of Toowoomba. Redlands was originally built on about 28 acres of land near the Drayton Road, approximately 1.5 miles (2.4 km) from Toowoomba.

Wilcox received his early business training with the firm of Messrs Cribb and Foote of Ipswich and with Holberton's of Toowoomba. Later, Wilcox together with his brother Robert founded the firm Wilcox Brothers merchants, located in Ruthven Street for a number of years. Wilcox Brothers eventually sold out to Messrs Laidlaw and Peak.

The outbuildings originally included a 3-stalled stable, harness room, carpenter's shop, two bedrooms, fodder room, coach house and hay loft; battened fowl house, piggery, and cow pens, to accommodate Wilcox's interest in farming pursuits as a hobby at Redlands.

The foundations of Redlands are reputedly of local bluestone, the bricks supplied by the local brick and tile company, the glass by Exton and Gough of Brisbane, and the iron railing for the balcony and cresting by the Toowoomba Foundry. Redlands is said to still have the original corrugated iron roof which was imported from England and which bears the stamp of its producer on every sheet.

The avenue of Norfolk and bunya pines lining the approach to Redlands was planted when the house was constructed. It is thought that Wilcox also created the "teardrop" garden at the front of the building, complete with fountain, at around the same time. The original fountain has since been replaced.

In 1919, some time after his retirement, Wilcox sold Redlands to Dr Alexander Horn. In 1921 Redlands was sold to Mr Edward Farmer, a grazier. In 1945 the Lutheran Church resolved to purchase Redlands from Farmer's widow, for a sum of approximately £5000.

On 10 February 1946 (the 400th anniversary of Martin Luther's death), Redlands was dedicated as Concordia Lutheran College, a co-educational Lutheran Boarding School.

Since the establishment of Concordia College, Redlands has served a number of purposes including a residence for the first headmaster and his family, offices and other uses associated with the college. A major building program commenced in the 1960s with the addition of several school buildings in the grounds of the college. Redlands is presently used as the central administration block for the College.

== Description ==
Redlands, a two-storeyed brick building, is located on a level site facing a formal garden and is approached via a long avenue of mature pine trees to the north. The building has a U-shaped hipped corrugated iron roof with a central valley, paired eave brackets and verandahs on the east, north and west with unlined curved corrugated iron awnings.

The symmetrical north elevation has a projecting double storeyed porch, with a flight of stone steps, surmounted by a cross. The verandahs have timber posts with cast iron balustrade, brackets and valance. The northeast and northwest corners of the ground floor verandahs have decorative coloured glass and pressed metal screens and infill panels.

The building has Flemish bond brickwork with painted quoining, step-out sash bay windows on the ground floor and a central arched entry to the north with stained glass fanlight and sidelights. The first floor also has a central entry of French doors with stained glass inserts, featuring painted birds, fanlight and sidelights. The south elevation has been cement rendered.

Internally, the building has a central hall with a carved cedar staircase at the south. The ground floor has rendered walls, elaborate pressed metal ceilings of varying designs and cedar joinery. The northwest room has a black marble fireplace surround with hand painted tiles depicting birds. The northeast room has a white marble fireplace surround and other rooms have carved timber surrounds, all with painted tiles. The foyer has an arched internal doorway with patterned glass fanlight and sidelights. The first floor has papered walls, panelled or boarded ceilings and cedar joinery.

The formal garden to the north forms a turning circle and consists of a central fountain, flagpole, hedge border, garden beds in the form of the school's initials and areas of lawn.

A covered path links the building to a more recent classroom and staff block immediately to the south. Other school buildings built since the late 1950s, predominantly of two-storeyed brick, are built to the east, south and west. Playing fields are located either side of the entrance drive to the north, leaving the building's northern outlook open.

== Heritage listing ==
Redlands was listed on the Queensland Heritage Register on 21 October 1992 having satisfied the following criteria.

The place is important in demonstrating the evolution or pattern of Queensland's history.

Redlands, erected in 1889, is important in demonstrating the pattern of Queensland's history, in particular the pattern of Toowoomba's growth during the late 1880s.

The place is important in demonstrating the principal characteristics of a particular class of cultural places.

It is important in demonstrating the principal characteristics of a large, late 1880s residence.

The place is important because of its aesthetic significance.

It is important in exhibiting a range of aesthetic characteristics valued by the Toowoomba community, in particular the decorative composition of the building's facade; the quality and craftsmanship of the cedar joinery, pressed metal ceilings, marble fireplace surrounds and stained glass; and the formal layout of the building, north garden and avenue of pine trees and their contribution to the streetscape of Stephen Street and to the Toowoomba townscape.

The place has a strong or special association with a particular community or cultural group for social, cultural or spiritual reasons.

Redlands has a strong association with the development of the Concordia College, as the college's original building and site of dedication.

The place has a special association with the life or work of a particular person, group or organisation of importance in Queensland's history.

It has a special association with the life of prominent Toowoomba businessman Edmund Wilcox; and with Toowoomba architect James Marks as a major example of his residential work.
