= Russell Bussian =

Australian rugby league player

Personal information
- Full name: Russell Bussian
- Born: 26 June 1973 (age 53) Toowoomba, Queensland, Australia
- Height: 188 cm (6 ft 2 in)
- Weight: 94 kg (14 st 11 lb)

Playing information
- Position: Fullback, Centre
Club
Years	Team	Pld	T	G	FG	P
1993–94	Gold Coast Seagulls	13	7	0	0	28
2002	Saint-Gaudens Bears	1	0	0	0	0
2010	Limoux Grizzlies	1	1	0	0	4
	Total	15	8	0	0	32

Russell Bussian (/bʊsɪæn/) (born 26 June 1973) is a former professional rugby league footballer who played in the 1990s and 2000s. He played at club level for the Gold Coast Seagulls , North Queensland Cowboys, North Sydney Bears, Ipswich Jets, Saint-Gaudens Bears, and the Limoux Grizzlies.

== Playing career ==
Bussian grew up in Toowoomba where he attended Harristown State High School. He was graded by the Seagulls in 1992. He made his first grade debut from the bench in his side's 48−4 loss to the Canberra Raiders at Bruce Stadium in round 9 of the 1993 season. In the 1994 season, Bussian played in 11 games and scored 7 tries finishing as the season second to Wayne Bartrim as club's top try scorer. Bussian signed for the North Queensland Cowboys in their inaugural year and later North Sydney Bears.

In 2000, 5 years after his stint with the Seagulls ended, Bussian headed to France to play for French side the Saint-Gaudens Bears in the Elite One Championship. He was player/coach in Saint-Gaudens championship win against UTC in 2004. Bussian later played for Elite One Championship side the Limoux Grizzlies in the 2010 season at 37 years of age. Bussian's last game in first grade was against Lezignan in 2023 aged 49.Bussian still continues to play and live in France.
