= South Toowoomba, Queensland =

South Toowoomba
- Suburb
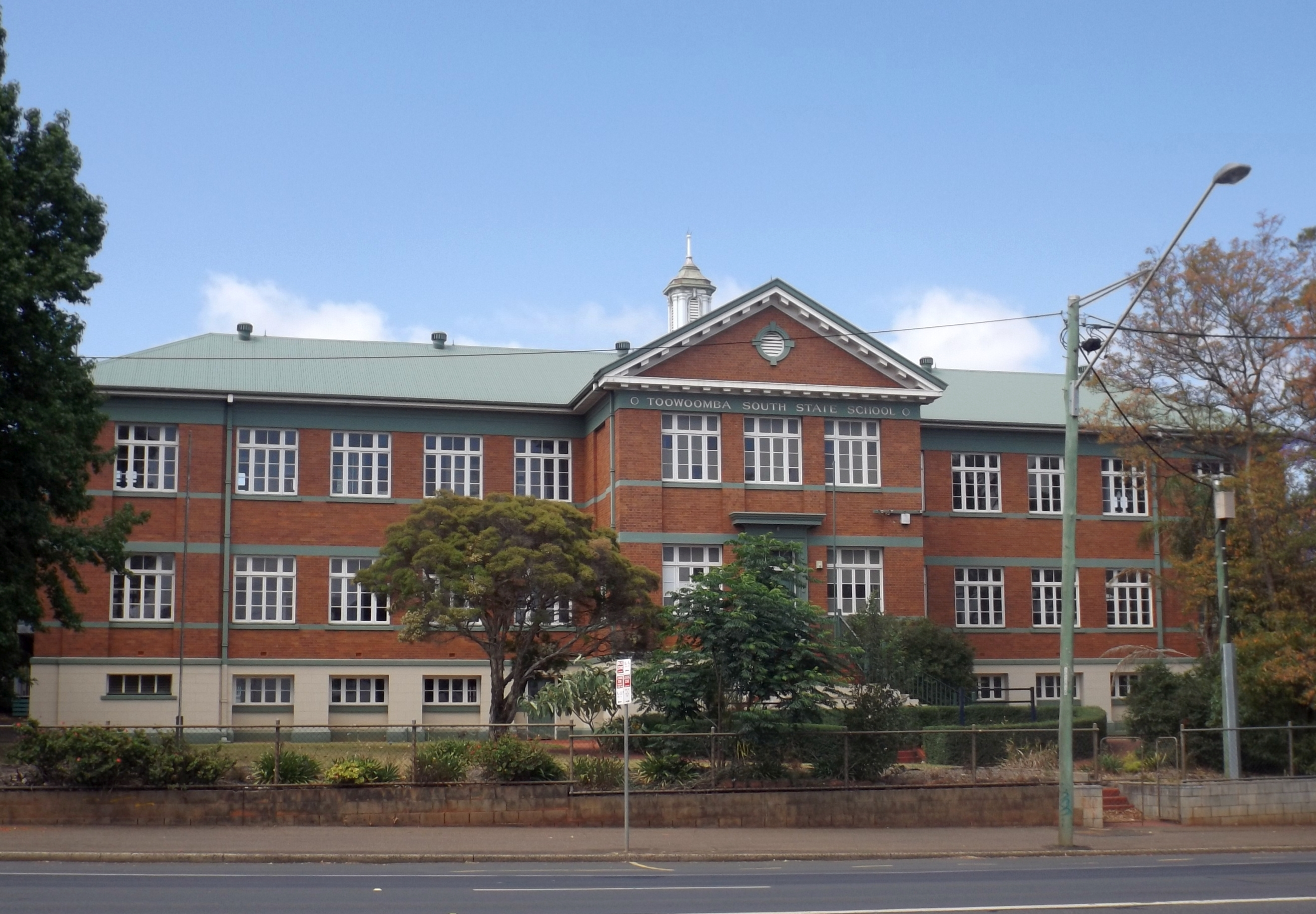
- Toowoomba South State School, 2014

- Interactive map of South Toowoomba
- Coordinates: 27.5761°S 151.9538°E
- Country: Australia
- State: Queensland
- City: Toowoomba
- LGA: Toowoomba Region
- Location: 1.8 km (1.1 mi) S of Toowoomba CBD; 128 km (80 mi) W of Brisbane

Government
  - State electorate: Toowoomba South
  - Federal division: Groom

Area
  - Total: 3.7 km^{2} (1.4 sq mi)

Population
  - Total: 5,512 (2021 census)
  - Density: 1,490/km^{2} (3,860/sq mi)
- Time zone: UTC+10:00 (AEST)
- Postcode: 4350
Suburbs around South Toowoomba
Newtown	Toowoomba City	East Toowoomba
Harristown	South Toowoomba	Rangeville
Harristown	Kearneys Spring	Centenary Heights

South Toowoomba is a suburban locality in Toowoomba in the Toowoomba Region, Queensland, Australia. In the 2021 census, South Toowoomba had a population of 5,512 people.

== Geography ==
South Toowoomba is located immediately south of the Toowoomba city centre.

== History ==
Giabal is an Australian Aboriginal language. The Giabal (Paiamba, Gomaingguru) language region includes the landscape within the local government boundaries of the Toowoomba Regional Council, particularly Toowoomba south to Allora and west to Millmerran.

St Patrick's Catholic Primary School opened in 1863 at St Patrick's Catholic Church with lay teachers but from 1873 was operated by the Sisters of Mercy. St Patrick's Secondary School for Girls opened in 1914 and was renamed The Cathedral School in 1938. In 1959 the two schools were renamed St Saviour's Primary School and St Saviour's Secondary School. Subsequently the secondary school was renamed St Saviour's College. From 1989 the secondary school came under lay administration. In 1994 the primary school also came under lay administration.

Toowoomba South State School opened in 1865. It was divided into Toowoomba South Girls and Infants School and Toowoomba South Boys School in 1869. On 1 April 1878 the Girls and Infants School split into Toowoomba Middle Girls State School and Toowoomba Middle Infants State School, but on 1 March 1880 they were merged to create Toowoomba Middle Girls and Infants State School. On 22 January 1883 the school was split again into Toowoomba South Girls State School and Toowoomba South Infants State School, being merged back on 1 October 1900 into Toowoomba South Girls and Infants School. In 1983 the Girls and Infants School and the Boys School were merged to re-establish Toowoomba South State School. The school closed on 31 December 2013. Over the many years and the splits/mergers, the physical footprint of the school (as a whole) has changed. At its commencement, the school was on the north-east corner of Ruthven Street and Lawrence Street (27.5702°S 151.9523°E), later expanding through James Street. At its closure, the school was at 158 James Street (27.5697°S 151.9526°E). During much of its history, the school also occupied 152 James Street (corner of Neil Street, 27.5694°S 151.9546°E). This series of maps shows some of the changes. The school's website was archived.

Special education ("opportunity classes") commenced at Toowoomba South State School in 1923. On 26 January 1960, these classes moved to the new Toowoomba Opportunity School (later Toowoomba Special School) in Centenary Heights.

== Demographics ==
In the 2016 census, South Toowoomba had a population of 5,224 people.

In the 2021 census, South Toowoomba had a population of 5,512 people.

== Heritage listings ==
South Toowoomba has a number of heritage-listed sites, including:

- James Street: St Patricks Cathedral
- 158 James Street: Toowoomba South State School
- Pechey Street: Toowoomba Hospital
- 68 Stephen Street: Cottage

== Education ==
St Saviour's Primary School is a Catholic primary (Prep–6) school for boys and girls at 14 Lawrence Street (27.5708°S 151.9530°E. In 2017, the school had an enrolment of 409 students with 25 teachers (21 full-time equivalent) and 19 non-teaching staff (9 full-time equivalent).

St Saviour's College is a Catholic secondary (7–12) school for girls at Neil Street (27.5721°S 151.9535°E). In 2017, the school had an enrolment of 158 students with 24 teachers (21 full-time equivalent) and 15 non-teaching staff (11 full-time equivalent).

There are no government schools in South Toowoomba. The nearest government primary schools are:

- Harristown State School in neighbouring Harristown to the west
- Toowoomba North State School in neighbouring Toowoomba City to the north
- Toowoomba East State School in neighbouring East Toowoomba to the north-east
- Rangeville State School in neighbouring Rangeville to the east
- Middle Ridge State School in Middle Ridge to the south-east

The nearest government secondary schools are:

- Harristown State High School in neighbouring Harristown to the west
- Centenary Heights State High School in neighbouring Centenary Heights to the south-east

The University of Queensland operates a Rural Clinical School in located at Toowoomba Hospital.

== Amenities ==
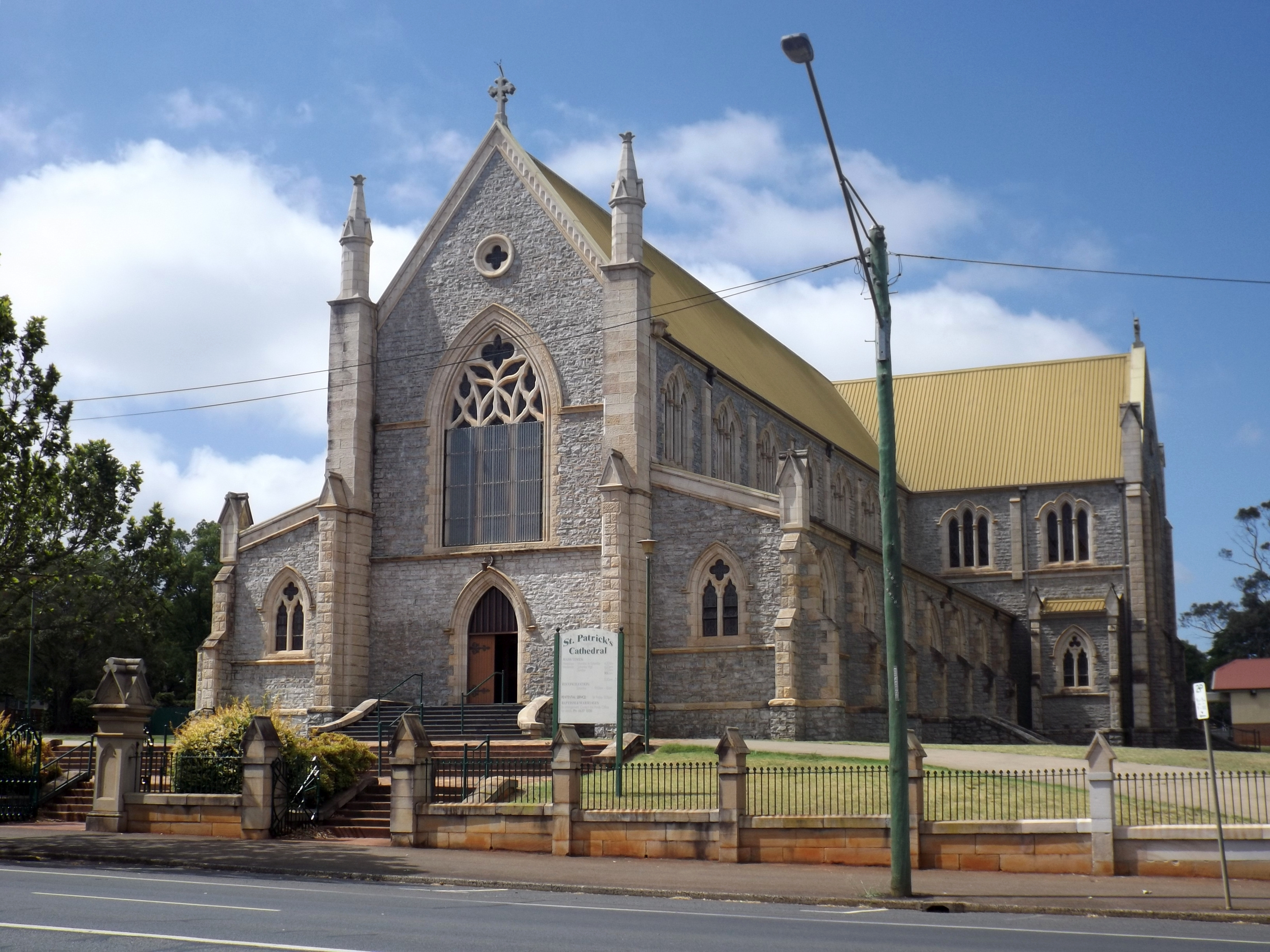
St Patricks Cathedral, 2014

- St Patricks Catholic Cathedral
- Downs Shopping Centre
- City Colf Club – Venue for local entertainment and host of the Coca-Cola Queensland PGA Championship
- Toowoomba Hospital
- Lake Annand
