= Toowoomba South State School =

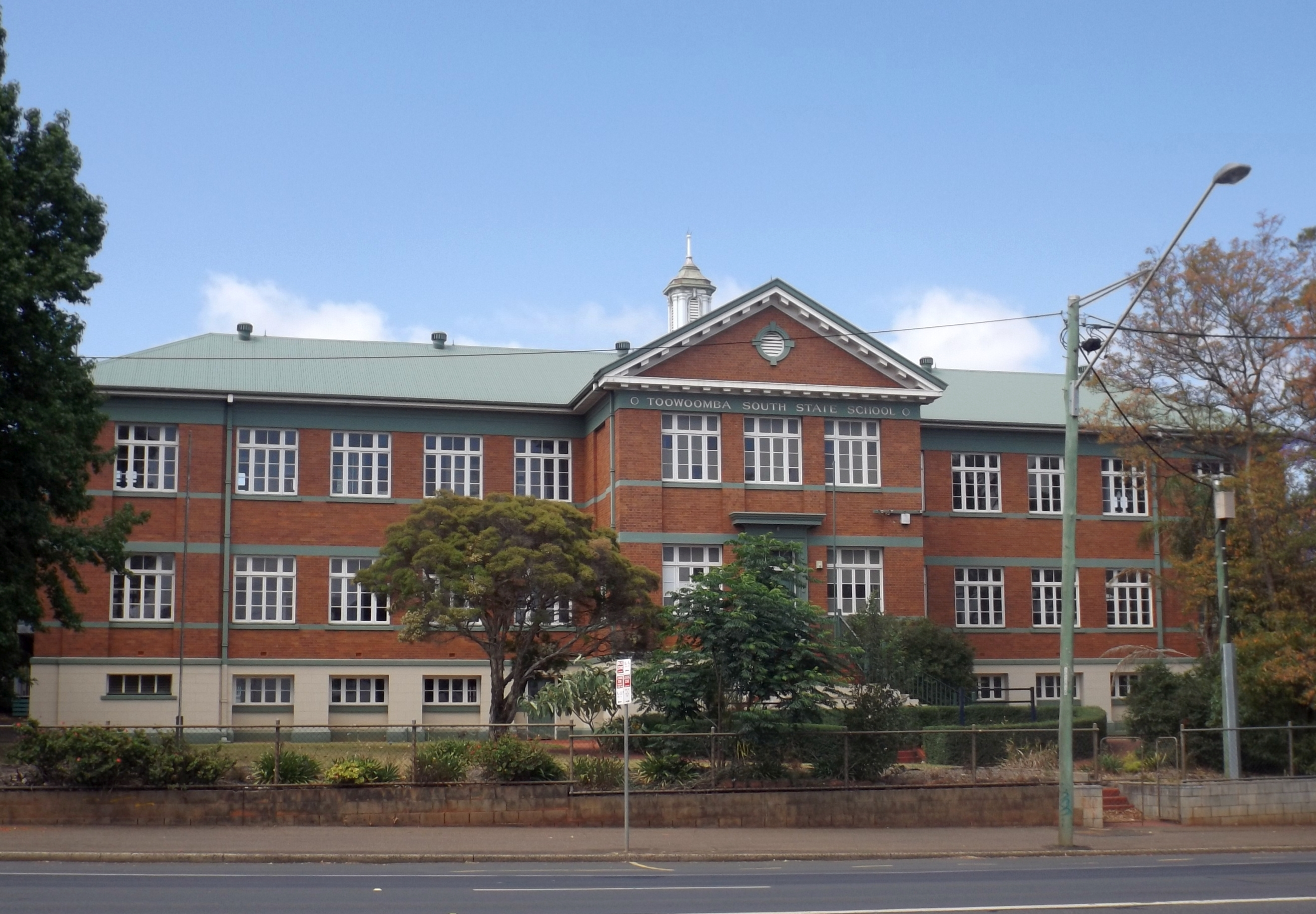
- Building on the corner of Ruthven and James Streets, 2014

- Location within Queensland
- 27.5697°S 151.9526°E
- Location: 158 James Street, South Toowoomba, Toowoomba, Toowoomba Region, Queensland, Australia

Site notes
- Architect: Department of Public Works (Queensland)

Queensland Heritage Register
- Official name: Toowoomba South State School
- Type: state heritage
- Designated: 2 December 2013
- Reference no.: 602824

Toowoomba South State School is a heritage-listed former school at 158 James Street, South Toowoomba, Queensland, Australia. It was designed by Department of Public Works (Queensland). It was added to the Queensland Heritage Register on 2 December 2013.

Toowoomba South is one of the oldest primary schools in Queensland. It is the oldest State School in Toowoomba (although nearby Drayton State School is older). It was first opened in 1865, as school number 112. Initially the school was co-educational. It was closed in 2013.

== History ==
Toowoomba South State School was established as Toowoomba National School in 1865 on a large site in what was then the civic centre of Toowoomba. Over time it has acquired a number of buildings and landscape elements, including a playshed (1884), an open-air annexe (1913), a main, three-storey brick building (1941), a timber building called the Oslo Lunch Room (1945), a concrete, brick and timber classroom wing called the Wadley Wing (1959), and mature trees. It has been an important place of education since its establishment and a social and cultural focus for students, parents, teachers and members of the Toowoomba community.

European settlement of the Toowoomba area, traditional country of the Giabal and Jarowair people, commenced in 1840 when squatters first occupied pastoral runs on the Darling Downs. Near the boundaries of Westbrook, Gowrie and Eton Vale runs and at the junction of two routes to Gorman's and Hodgson's gaps through the Main Range, the small settlement of Drayton (originally known as "The Springs") evolved from 1842 as a stopping place servicing pastoralists and travellers. From the late 1840s, the Drayton Swamp Agricultural Area ("The Swamp" now Toowoomba), six kilometres to the north-east, began to be considered a more desirable location for settlement. Better land for market gardening, improved water supply, the support of squatters and land speculators, and, from 1855, a better route to Brisbane (the Toll Bar Road), were all advantages over Drayton.

In September 1853 a government survey reserved two blocks of land in Toowoomba for important civic functions. The blocks were bound by Ruthven, Lawrence, Hume and James streets, bisected by Neil Street. The reserves were for the Toowoomba Benevolent Asylum (later hospital), Roman Catholic and Presbyterian churches and schools, Toowoomba Town Hall, a market reserve and a National School on the corner of Lawrence and Ruthven streets. The allocation of land for these purposes in this area occurred because James Street was developing as the main commercial street, the route used by people travelling to Ipswich or south and west.

The site was reserved for a National School in Toowoomba is the present-day site at the rear of the existing campus now occupied by the Toowoomba South State School Hall, and the basketball and tennis courts (the corner of Lawrence and Ruthven Streets). The site of the current buildings was the hospital.

The name "Toowoomba" had gradually taken over from "The Swamp" by 1857 and the settlement continued to expand. At the time of its incorporation into a municipality (the Borough of Toowoomba) in November 1860, Toowoomba was on the way to supplanting Drayton as the principal service centre for the upper Darling Downs. Prior to 1859, Toowoomba's population was around 1500. Five years later this figure had doubled. The rapid economic and social development of Toowoomba in the 1860s was influenced by local residents who strongly promoted the prospects of the town, and political representatives who successfully lobbied for government funding for civic improvements. By 1861 local residents were agitating for the establishment of a government school.

Colonial governments played an important role in the provision of formal education. In 1848 (before the separation of Queensland in 1859) the New South Wales Government established National Schools. This was continued by the Queensland Government after the colony's creation in 1859. The Education Act 1860 established the Queensland Board of General Education and began to standardise curriculum, teacher training and facilities. The Education Act 1875 provided a number of key initiatives for primary education; it was to be free, compulsory and secular. The Department of Public Instruction was established to administer the Act. This move standardised the provision of education and, despite difficulties, colonial educators achieved a remarkable feat in bringing basic literacy to most Queensland children by 1900.

The provision of schools was considered an essential step in the development of early Queensland communities. The formal education of Queensland children was seen as integral to the success of a town, the colony and the nation. Land and construction labour was often donated by the local people and schools frequently became a major focus within the community as a place symbolising progress, for social interaction, and as a source of pride. Also, the development and maintenance of schools frequently involved donations and work by teachers, parents, and pupils. Because of their significant connections with the local community, schools have occasionally incorporated other socially important elements such as war memorials and halls used for community purposes. They also typically retain a significant enduring connection with former pupils, their parents, and teachers. Social events involving a wide portion of the local community have often been held at schools, utilising the buildings and grounds - such as fetes, markets, public holiday celebrations, school break-up days, fundraisers, sporting events, reunions, and dances.

As in other Australian colonies, the Queensland Government developed standard plans for its school buildings. This helped to ensure consistency and economy. The standard designs were continually refined by government architects in response to changing needs and educational philosophy. Queensland school buildings were particularly innovative in their approach to climate control, lighting and ventilation. Until the 1960s school buildings were predominantly timber-framed, taking advantage of the material's abundance in the state and the high number of builders skilled in its use. This also allowed for easy and economical construction and enabled the government to provide facilities in remote areas. Due to the standardisation of facilities, schools across the state were developed in distinctly similar ways and became complexes of typical components. These components included: the teaching building/s, the school yard, the horse paddock which was often later configured into a sports oval, the teacher's residence, and a variety of features such as sporting facilities or play equipment, shade structures, gardens and trees.

While the school site had been reserved in 1853, it was continued lobbying a decade later that led to the opening of the Toowoomba's first state-run primary school. In August 1863, the Courier reported "great exertions" being made towards the establishment of a National School for Toowoomba. By the end of the year the "Local Patrons", the committee advocating for the school, were advised the Board of Education was intending to call immediately for tenders for the erection of a brick school at a cost of £300. On behalf of the town, the local patrons guaranteed the supply of £100 towards the school's construction.

On 25 January 1864 the Chairman of the Board of Education, Arthur Macalister, laid the foundation stone for the school. Construction of the school, designed by architect Benjamin Backhouse and built by Mr Young, continued through 1864, a year when other important buildings for Toowoomba, including the Post Office and the hospital, were in progress or completed.

The Toowoomba National School opened on 22 January 1865 on the school reserve, with James Hodgson appointed the first Head Teacher. As pupil attendance increased, the initial building soon became inadequate. Construction of a new building on the site to accommodate female and infant students was complete by October 1869. The school was remade into two separate departments, renamed Toowoomba South Boys' State School and Toowoomba South Girls' and Infants' State School. The Girls' and Infants' school began with 98 pupils enrolled with Mary Jane Roulston as the first Head Teacher.

In 1869, the school was separated into the Toowoomba South Boys School (number 109) and the Toowoomba South Girls School (number 112). This led to there being two campuses the original on Ruthven Street being the Girls School, the other one block northeast on Neil Street the new Boys School campus (adjacent to the Market Reserve (now Groom Park)). The two schools were separated by Neil Street and St Patrick's Church (Catholic). In 1878, the girls school became known as the Toowoomba Middle Girls State School and the Infants School was opened as Toowoomba Middle Infants (number 399).

During the 1870s Toowoomba consolidated its status as the main urban centre of the Darling Downs. The arrival of the Main Line railway in 1867 secured the town's development and subsequently made it the hub for the Southern and Western railways. The economy diversified to include numerous small-scale manufacturing outlets, while the majority of administrative, service and other government and education functions for the surrounding region were centred on the town. Toowoomba's progress was reflected in improvements to the physical environment. Important capital works were commenced or completed including the draining of the swamps, improved water supply, gasworks for lighting, extensive tree plantings and the initial development of Queen's Park. Earlier temporary structures were increasingly replaced with more permanent and impressive buildings.

In 1877 the hospital adjacent to the school was vacated after a new hospital was built on the outskirts of the town. The school expanded to incorporate the hospital site and occupied the two newly-vacant hospital buildings; the boys occupied the former men's ward and the girls and infants occupied the former women's ward.

A playshed was constructed to the rear of the former hospital buildings in January 1884. Playsheds were free-standing shelters that provided covered play space and were often used for unofficial teaching space when needed. They were timber-framed structures, generally open on all sides although were sometimes partially enclosed with timber boards or corrugated galvanised iron sheets. The hipped (or less frequently, gabled) roofs were clad with timber shingles or corrugated iron and they had an earth or decomposed granite floor. Fixed timber seating ran between the perimeter posts. Playsheds were a typical addition to state schools across Queensland between c. 1880s and the 1950s. They were built to standard designs that ranged in size relative to student numbers. School sites were typically cleared of all vegetation and the provision of all-weather outdoor space was needed. After c. 1909 school buildings were high-set, allowing students to play in the understorey and playsheds were not frequently constructed. The playshed at Toowoomba was built to a standard design. The construction plans show it was 30 by 20 feet (9.1 m × 6.1 m) with a hipped roof clad with corrugated iron sheets, generous eaves, and supported on 10 timber posts. It had timber perimeter seating and the floor was gravel (altered to asphalt in 1885). The playshed is the oldest structure on the school site.

By the 1890s a well-developed area in the northern area near the railway station centred on Russell Street had emerged as the commercial centre of Toowoomba, while government activities centred on Margaret Street, in the vicinity of the court house. The James Street area was considered to be the fringe. Toowoomba's municipal council had built a new town hall in 1880 but by 1898 had decided to relocate the town hall to a more central location on Ruthven Street, with the new Toowoomba City Hall completed in 1900. The former town hall site became available for redevelopment and was purchased by the Queensland Government. In 1906 the girls and infants moved to a new school building on the nearby site of the former town hall. By this time there were 300 pupils enrolled at the school. The former women's hospital ward was condemned and demolished. Other school buildings were demolished or removed leaving the western side of the school site empty. This land was subdivided into many small allotments and sold.

By 1938 it was decided the two Toowoomba South schools would swap sites. According to the schools' centenary booklet, increasing attendances and limited playground space for the boys were both factors in this decision. The move to the girls' and infants' site meant the boys could access the large playing field of Groom Park behind the school. In December 1939 the Executive Council authorised the demolition of the boys' school (the "obsolescent" former men's hospital ward), and the construction of a new brick building for the girls' and infants' school.

Plans had been drawn for a substantial, three-storey brick building in December 1938 by Department of Public Works architect Gilbert Robert Beveridge. It was one of an important group of brick school buildings built during and after the Great Depression, initially as part of the government's unemployment relief program. Unemployment relief projects at schools, in the form of grounds improvement works, were undertaken by the previous Country and Progressive National Party government (1929–1932) led by Premier Arthur Moore. The relief work program expanded considerably in 1932 when newly elected Labor Premier William Forgan-Smith instituted a capital works program focussed on building modern infrastructure to provide relief work for unemployed Queenslanders. The "improvement" of schools was a primary aspect of the scheme. Large new buildings at Toowoomba East State School (1936) and Toowoomba North State School (1937) were constructed during this time. The relief work program ended in 1938, transitioning into a permanent, long-term, capital works program. In accordance with government policy, the Department of Public Works maintained the use of day labour for building projects.

Until the 1960s, purpose-built brick government schools were far less common than those of timber. If brick was employed, it was usually only in prosperous urban or suburban areas with stable or rapidly-increasing populations. Earlier government brick school buildings were individually designed with variations in style, size, and form, similar to Queensland's private schools, technical colleges and Schools of Arts. They were given comparatively generous budgets, resulting in impressive edifices. Light and ventilation was still a primary concern for the architects but compared to contemporary timber education buildings, these buildings had a grander character and greater landmark attributes.

The pattern of brick school buildings in prosperous or rising suburban areas continued during the 1930s relief work scheme, in greater numbers and as a more recognisable type. The Queensland Public Works Department and Department of Public Instruction were extremely enthusiastic about the brick school buildings designed in the 1930s. They were considered monuments to progress, embodying the most modern principles of the ideal education environment.

The 1930s brick school buildings exhibited many common characteristics. Frequently, they were two storeys above an open understorey and built to accommodate up to 1000 students. They adopted a symmetrical plan form and exhibited neo-classical stylistic elements and a prominent central entry. They were able to be built in stages if necessary. The plan arrangement was similar to that of timber buildings being only one classroom deep, accessed by a long straight verandah. Ideally, the classrooms would face south with the verandah on the north but little concession was made for this in practice and almost all brick school buildings faced the primary boundary road, regardless of orientation. Classrooms were commonly divided by folding timber partitions and the undercroft was used as covered play space, storage, ablutions and other functions.

The brick school building for Toowoomba South Girls' and Infants' State School was prominently sited, fronting James Street, and was typical of its type. It was a three-storey symmetrical building comprising an understorey at ground level that accommodated open play space and ablutions, and two upper levels that accommodated 11 classrooms, teachers' rooms, and generous hat and cloak rooms. All but one of the classrooms faced south.

Construction of the brick building had begun by March 1940. It was nearing completion in early 1941 when alterations were made to accommodate infant classes; a partition was removed to combine a teacher's room and classroom on the second floor. This also involved rearrangement of the corridor windows and the blocking up of a western window.

The building was one of the Department of Public Works' major construction projects of 1940. Other important buildings constructed at this time include the Innisfail Courthouse, Brisbane Dental Hospital and College and the Maryborough Courthouse. The volume of work for state schools in the year ending June 1940 was high, with 11 new schools completed and additions made to 30 schools, as well as the remodelling of others.

The Girls' and Infants' School and Opportunity School pupils moved to the new school site on 17 March 1941, while work was still being completed. The building was officially opened 21 June 1941 by Minister for Public Instruction, Henry Bruce. It cost £16,500, accommodated 480 students and was constructed using day labour.

Behind the new brick building was positioned an older building that had been relocated from the former girls' and infants' school site and was ready for occupation in 1941. This building was an Open-air annexe, the first of its type built in Queensland. It had been opened 29 November 1913 by Under-Secretary for Education, John Douglas Story.

Open-air annexes were introduced as a standard design in 1913 by the Department of Public Instruction. This design was developed in response to contemporary medical thought related to the need for adequate ventilation and high levels of natural light for health, coupled with the need to build cheap, portable schools. Dr Eleanor Bourne had been appointed the first Medical Inspector of Schools in 1911 and under her instruction the relationship between classroom environment and child health was given prominence. Accordingly, school architecture evolved through iteration and experimentation to improve interior light and ventilation. The open-air annexe type achieved maximum ventilation and natural light; it contained only one large room and had only one wall, the western verandah wall. The other sides were open with only adjustable canvas blinds for enclosure. Ideally, they would be high-set, thereby increasing the ventilation and providing further shelter underneath. The design was praised by educationalists as conducive to the health of pupils.

On its original site, the open-air annexe was used for infants' classes. It was a high-set, timber-framed building with a gable roof and comprised one large room 22 by 44 feet (6.7 m × 13.4 m). It had a west-facing verandah that was semi-enclosed at both ends to form hat rooms. As per the standard design, the classroom had only one wall (the western verandah wall) and the other sides were open and had adjustable canvas blinds.

Open-air annexes proved to be inadequate and were discontinued in 1923, although many had been constructed across Queensland in 10 years. The open sides provided limited weather protection, better climate control was needed, and the canvas blinds deteriorated quickly. All open-air annexes in Queensland were modified to provide better enclosure. By 1929 the open-air annexe at Toowoomba was enclosed; the blinds were replaced with casement windows. A small, semi-detached extension with a hipped roof was added to the centre of the western verandah accommodating a teacher's room at the classroom level and a store room underneath. In 1930 the western verandah was enclosed with sliding sashes and the balustrade was replaced by cement sheet. After its enclosure, minimal alterations of the open-air annexe at Toowoomba were made over time.

When the open-air annexe was relocated behind the new brick building, it was positioned so the verandah faced north. In 1952, improvements were made to the lighting and ventilation of the classroom by adding soffit vents and single hung sash windows into the verandah wall.

After relocation, the open-air annexe was used for opportunity classes. Opportunity schools (initially called Backward Classes) had been established in 1923 by the Department of Public Instruction in seven Queensland schools, one of which was Toowoomba South Girls' and Infants' State School. The previous year, Minister for Education, John Huxham, said he knew of only one teacher in the state who was interested in and suitable for this form of special education; Head Teacher of Toowoomba South Girls' and Infants' State School, Mary Deacon.

Opportunity classes were designed to accelerate students with learning difficulties and to teach disabled children vocational skills. The provision of special state education for struggling and disabled students was prompted by community agitation and was part of the wider social, medical and educational modernising reforms of the 1920s. State-funded special education began in Queensland in 1893 when government subsidy was provided to a benevolent training centre in Brisbane that taught blind and deaf children. However, it took until 1923 and the drive of District Inspector William Bevington before children with intellectual and emotional problems and other physical disabilities were included in state education programs. The establishment of special education was an important step in providing an inclusive state education system.

On 25 January 1960 the Toowoomba Opportunity (later Special) School moved off-site into purpose-designed premises. The open-air annexe was then used by the school for various ancillary teaching space, including music and film classes, and a library.

The Department of Public Instruction was largely unprepared for the enormous demand for state education that began in the late 1940s and continued well into the 1960s. This was a nationwide occurrence resulting from the unprecedented population growth, now commonly referred to as the "baby boomers". Queensland schools were overcrowded and to cope; many new buildings were constructed and existing buildings were extended.

After 1945, Toowoomba continued the steady growth that had largely characterised its first century of development. The city's estimated population in mid-1953 was 40,000, a rapid expansion from the 1947 census figure of 35,194. Primary and secondary industries expanded, tourist numbers grew, and construction projects provided a boom for the local building industry. In 1954 alone, over £2,000,000 worth of projects were undertaken including new dwellings, commercial buildings, and other expansion projects. The growth of Toowoomba was reflected at the Toowoomba South Girls' and Infants' State School by increased enrolments and building additions to the school. At the time of the transfer of Grade 8 students to high school at the end of 1963, there were around 700 pupils at the school.

A building was constructed at Toowoomba South Girls' and Infants' State School in 1945 using money granted to the school by the Commonwealth Government. This money was granted to all schools in 1945 to commemorate the end of World War II and the amount was based on enrolment numbers. A meeting of mothers convened by head teacher, Aileen Wadley, had decided the funds would be used to establish the "Oslo Lunch Room", a tuckshop offering healthy lunches (based on the Norwegian nutritious lunch movement) that would be "a permanent benefit to the children of the school". The building was a standard, temporary building designed by the Department of Public Works.

Temporary buildings were constructed at the Girls' and Infants' school between 1943 and 1951. This standard type was introduced as an expedient, temporary solution to the exceptional growth in student numbers during World War II and the immediate post-war period when skilled labour was scarce and materials were in short supply. They were small timber buildings, low-set on concrete piers and had skillion or gabled roofs clad with corrugated metal sheets. External walls were clad with vertical tongue and groove timber boards and the rear wall had casements with operable fanlights sheltered by a simple hood. Accessed from a verandah, the type comprised two interconnected classrooms 21 by 18 feet (6.4 m × 5.5 m), which was consistent with the department's ideal dimensions of the time. The design, materials and form were a departure from earlier types; they did not influence subsequent designs, and only a small number of temporary buildings were constructed.

Drawings for the construction of the Oslo Lunch Room show that it was a timber-framed and -clad building with a skillion roof and accommodated two interconnected rooms. It was positioned to the west of the open-air annexe and to the south of the playshed. The building was oriented so the verandah faced north and the windows of the rooms faced south. The Oslo Lunch Room opened in 1946.

In 1947 a three-storey extension was added to the rear of the 1941 brick building providing a further two classrooms (one on each of the first and second floors) and an understorey play space. The extension was designed in 1944 by architect Thomas Robert Gladwin from within the Department of Public Works. It copied the architectural details from the original section. In order to make room for the extension, the playshed was relocated on the site further south, adjacent to the western boundary.

In 1952 the Oslo Lunch Room was converted for domestic science lessons. The verandah was enclosed with vertical timber boards and glass louvre windows to form a teacher's room and fitting room and a laundry. Casement windows with operable fanlights were added to the eastern gable end wall and high-level glass louvres were added to the west gable end wall. New doors and built-in sinks and joinery were added. In 1964 the Oslo Lunch Room was converted for use as a tuckshop.

In 1955 two allotments fronting Ruthven Street (part of the original school site sold in 1906) were acquired and incorporated into the school grounds. Here, an infants' wing was constructed in two stages between 1957 and 1959 and opened by the Minister for Education, Jack Pizzey, in October 1959. The building was a standard design by architects within the Department of Public Works. It was a long and narrow two-storey building with open play space and one classroom on the ground level and classrooms on the upper level accessed by a verandah along the northern side. It was a brick, timber and concrete structure with a timber-framed gable roof. It had banks of timber- framed awning windows on the southern elevation, providing a high level of natural light and ventilation to the classrooms. It was connected to the western end of the main building via a ground-level covered walkway. This walkway was reconfigured in 1962 to be two storeys and include toilets, a staff room, a health services room and a store room.

In March 1960 a plaque mounted on the new infants' wing was unveiled by Director of Primary Education, Arch Guymer. It dedicated the wing to recently retired Aileen Wadley, who taught at Toowoomba South Girls' and Infants' State School from 1 January 1938 to 31 December 1959. The building was called the "Wadley Wing". In 1977 the verandah was enclosed with aluminium-framed sliding windows and a ground-floor extension accommodating a janitor's room was added to the southern side of the wing in 1979.

Alterations were made to the first floor of the main building in 1960. This included removing a folding partition and inserting a new partition to create a teacher's room and a larger classroom. Further alterations to this building were made in 1972 when the first and second floor hat and cloak rooms were converted for use as a staff room, a reading room, and general space.

The provision of outdoor play space was a result of the early and continuing commitment to play-based education, particularly in primary school. Trees and gardens were planted as part of beautification of the school. In the 1870s, schools inspector William AJ Boyd was critical of tropical schools and amongst his recommendations was the importance of the addition of shade trees in the playground. In addition, Arbor Day celebrations began in Queensland in 1890. Landscape elements were often constructed to standard designs and were intrinsic to Queensland Government education philosophies. Educationalists believed gardening and Arbor Days instilled in young minds the value of hard work and activity, improved classroom discipline, developed aesthetic tastes and inspired people to stay on the land. Aesthetically-designed gardens were encouraged by regional inspectors.

The site of Toowoomba South State School has been landscaped over time to include trees, playing fields, courts, gardens, hardstand areas, shelters, and play structures. The school celebrated Arbor Day from 1890 and school activities have always involved the grounds, including parades, assemblies, sports days, and wider community social events like fetes and concerts. In 1958 extensive concrete retaining walls were constructed at the boundaries of the school and the earth was banked to create level areas for sports and to improve drainage.

On 30 October 1965 the school celebrated its centenary and a souvenir booklet was published for the event. A fete day was held and included various entertainments, the unveiling of a memorial in the grounds by Minister for Transport, Gordon Chalk, a tree planting ceremony, and an afternoon tea for past students. The Kath Dickson Art Gallery, comprising works presented by the Toowoomba Art Society, was also opened within the brick building by MLA for Toowoomba East, Mervyn Anderson. Kath Dickson taught at the school from 1937 to 1941 and 1946 to 1950 before returning as Principal from 1960 to 1975. During her time at the school she actively encouraged pupil involvement in cultural activities such as art.

Between the 1960s and the 1980s a modernisation of Queensland education occurred. The Education Act 1964 was a turning point and the first major update of Queensland education's governing legislation since 1875. Effectively, a new era of state education evolved with new architectural responses needed. The Department of Education (as it had been renamed in 1957) continued to give the responsibility of building design to the architects of the Department of Public Works. Due to new materials, technologies, educational philosophies, government policies, architectural styles and functional requirements, the evolution of standard designs became more fragmented. Rather than "improving" on the previous designs, architects began to design on a relatively clean slate, inspired by new precedents. Fundamentally, timber construction was no longer favoured and buildings were no longer predominantly high-set.

In 1975 a new library building was constructed at Toowoomba Girls' and Infants' State School. This was a "System IB74", a standard building designed by Codd Hopgood Industrial Architects, and was a concrete slab-on-ground, prefabricated steel structure.

The open-air annexe was moved to make room for the library construction. It was relocated at the southern end of the site, near the western boundary. It was oriented so that the verandah faced west and was low-set on concrete stumps. The teacher's room was removed from the verandah at this time and possibly became a pavilion for the nearby tennis courts. The enclosed verandah was altered to accommodate a toilet at the northern end which was later removed.

A 1975 site plan shows that between 1960 and 1975 the school grounds had expanded to include additional allotments on the western side facing Ruthven Street.

On 1 March 1983 the nearby Toowoomba South Boys' State School was closed and the boys were amalgamated into the girls' and infants' school, which was renamed Toowoomba South State School. Minor alterations to the toilets in the understorey of the 1941 building were undertaken during this transition. A large concrete and steel covered games area was constructed to the south of the 1941 brick building.

In 1990 the school celebrated its 125th anniversary of establishment and an anniversary souvenir booklet was published for the event.

In 1999 further alterations were made to the 1941 brick building. The westernmost classroom on the second floor was enlarged by partially removing the corridor wall and this space was incorporated into the classroom. At the same time, alterations were made to the Wadley Wing, including removing sections of the verandah wall, removing partitions, and inserting new partitions to create a withdrawal room and an art space.

Later the SEDUce (Special Education Development Unit) become part of Toowoomba South, giving the school 3 sections SEDU, Preschool and Primary School. The SEDU was relocated away from Toowoomba South in 2007 following the introduction of the Prep year. In 2006, a regional group of ESL (English as a Second Language) support teachers were added to the school. 2007 saw the preschool folded into the main school as part of the introduction of Prep Year in Queensland.

During the Australian Government's Building Education Revolution (BER) program, Toowoomba South State School received funding of $850,000 for the construction of a new Multi-Purpose hall. The BER program was the key element of the Australian Government's $42 billion "Nation Building - Economic Stimulus Plan", developed in response to the 2008 financial crisis. The hall, situated along the Ruthven Street side of the school was completed in 2012.

In the 2000s, enrolment figures at the school declined to around 70 in 2013. Cultural diversity was a feature of the school, with approximately 50% of students having English as a second language or identifying with Aboriginal and/or Torres Strait Islander cultures. The school also was the base for a Regional ESL (English as a Second Language) team who service schools in the Darling Downs and South-West area. In May 2013, the school was publicly announced by the Queensland Government as one of nine across the state identified for possible closure by the Department of Education as part of its "school viability assessment". Community responses included the establishment of a SOS (Save Our School) Committee, protests by the school's Parents and Citizens Association, and online campaigns against the school's closure. On 17 September 2013, Education Minister John-Paul Langbroek announced the school would close at the end of 2013.

The school retains buildings that were built and altered in accordance with an evolving educational philosophy. Since opening in 1865, it has taught generations of Toowoomba students and has been a place of employment for many teachers and other staff. It has been a key social focus for the local school community with the grounds and buildings the location of many social events over time. Its website was archived.

== Description ==
Toowoomba South State School is situated on a major thoroughfare on the fringe of the central business district of Toowoomba. The 1.5ha site is adjacent to the intersection of the New England and Warrego Highways and is a neighbour to St Patricks Cathedral. The school buildings comprise: a three-storey brick building; the Wadley Wing; the Oslo Lunch Room; the open-air annexe; the playshed; a library; a covered games area; and a multi-purpose hall.

=== The main building (1941, rear extension 1949) ===
Fronting James Street to the north is an imposing three-storey classroom building designed in a Neo-Classical style with a grand character and landmark attributes. The building sits at a distance from the front boundary with a central concrete path and steps leads to the front entrance of the building.

The building is symmetrically composed and comprises an understorey at ground level and two upper levels of classrooms. The exterior is rendered and scored to imitate coursed ashlar at ground level and has fine facebrick upper levels in English bond. A projecting central entrance bay with decorative pediment is flanked by wings with projecting end pavilions. The facade has rhythmic banks of timber-framed casement windows with fanlights on the first and second levels. The timber-framed hipped and gable roof is clad with corrugated metal sheets and has a prominent, decorative, metal ventilation fleche. The loadbearing structure supports a timber floor on steel bearers and concrete floors in the circulation spaces.

Entrance to the main (first) level is via a split stair with an iron balustrade to a large central door comprising two leaves with moulded panels, glazed fanlight, and rendered architrave and hood. A wide, short hall leads to the main perpendicular corridor. The hall has moulded concrete skirtings, rendered walls, timber plate rail, and sheet-and-battens ceiling. A wall-mounted plaque commemorates the building's opening. A teacher's room is on either side of the hall.

The first and second floors comprise classrooms, teacher's rooms, store rooms, and hat and cloak rooms, accessed from a wide corridor running the length of the northern side. The corridor has rendered walls and north-facing timber-framed casement windows and fanlights that retain original brass hardware. The wall between corridor and classroom has timber-framed double-hung sashes and awning sash fanlights; all retain original brass hardware. The ceiling of the first floor corridor is concrete with moulded concrete cornice and the ceiling of the second floor corridor is sheet-and-battens with timber cornice. The classrooms have rendered walls with moulded timber skirtings, architraves, and plate rails. The ceilings are sheet-and- battens with timber cornice. The ceilings of the second level have a central timber lattice ventilation panel.

Two stairwells provide vertical circulation. The stairs are red-painted concrete with an unpainted perimeter and the balustrades are decorative iron with a moulded clear-finished timber handrail. In the stair halls the perimeter of the concrete floor is coved to the wall and small store rooms are located under the stairs.

The understorey accommodates a large central play space and ablutions at either end, low-level bag and hat hooks, timber perimeter seats, and chalkboards. The floor is concrete and the walls are glazed facebrick rounded at corners. The toilets retain original timber cubicles, windows, and sheet-and-battens ceilings.

=== The Wadley Wing (1959) ===
Connected by a glazed, high-set corridor to the western end of the main building is the Wadley Wing. This long, narrow, timber-framed building is clad with facebrick and has a gable roof clad with corrugated metal sheets. The building is divided approximately in half into two adjoined sections, with the western section set at a lower level.

The eastern section of the building is high-set on timber trusses. The understorey accommodates one classroom and a facebrick ablutions block. The western section of the building is high-set on round concrete columns. Enclosed on the southern side by a later masonry wall and glass louvres, the understorey accommodates an open play area with a concrete floor and a timber perimeter seat.

The two sections are connected by a central stair hall. Another stair hall is located at the western end of the wing with a door out into a small yard to Ruthven Street, forming a secondary entrance into the school. The stair halls have timber stairs, unpainted timber floors, facebrick and chamferboard walls, raked ceilings lined with sheet material, and are brightly-lit by timber-framed, fixed, opaque glazing.

The upper level verandah runs the length of the northern side providing access to south-facing classrooms. The verandah is enclosed with aluminium-framed sliding windows, has a balustrade of bag racks, and a raked ceiling lined with sheet material and rounded cover strips. The verandah wall of the western portion retains chamferboard lining and banks of original timber-framed, double-hung sash windows with pivot-hung fanlights (all with original hardware), but modern doors. The verandah wall of the eastern portion has been altered by the insertion of large openings, removing all windows and doors.

The south walls of the classrooms have large banks of timber-framed awning sash windows that retain original hardware. The classroom floors are timber and the walls and flat ceiling are lined with sheet material with rounded cover strips. The partition walls of the western portion are not original nor in their original locations. The partitions of the eastern portion have large concertina doors to combine the rooms into one large space.

=== The Oslo Lunch Room (1945) ===
Located to the south of the main building is the Oslo Lunch Room, a small, timber-framed building low-set on concrete and steel stumps. It has an enclosed north-facing (front) verandah and comprises one large room. The exterior is clad with sheet material with timber cover battens. The verandah is enclosed with chamferboards and aluminium-framed sliding windows. It has a gable roof clad with corrugated metal sheets. The side and rear elevations have banks of timber-framed casement windows with awning sash fanlights.

Entry is via two sets of steel and timber stairs onto the verandah, which has a timber floor and a ceiling lined on the rake with v-jointed timber boards. The verandah has a small room at either end formed by walls of single-skin, timber, v-jointed boards. These rooms retain early timber doors with glazed panels and fanlights as well as timber shelving and a sink.

A large opening has been inserted in the verandah wall.

The room has a timber floor and the walls and ceilings are lined with sheet material with timber cover battens. The room has modern built-in kitchen furniture that is not of cultural heritage significance.

=== The playshed (1884) ===
A playshed stands in the grounds to the south of the Oslo Lunch Room. It is a timber-framed shelter with a concrete floor and a hipped roof clad with corrugated metal sheets. The southern and western sides are sheeted with corrugated iron that shields a timber perimeter seat that runs on these sides.

=== The open-air annexe (1913) ===
To the south of the playshed near the southern boundary of the site, stands the open-air annexe. This timber-framed building is low-set on concrete stumps and comprises one large classroom and an enclosed western (front) verandah. The walls are clad with weatherboards that have ventilation slots in the gable end apexes. The weatherboards wrap the ends of the enclosed verandah forming the original hat rooms. The remainder of the verandah is enclosed with sheet material with timber cover battens and sliding, timber-framed windows. The other elevations have timber-framed casements, some with small timber-framed fanlights, and the windows of the gable ends have small metal hoods. The gable roof, which is continuous over the verandah, is clad with corrugated metal sheets and has timber gable fretwork. The roof has wide eaves and the soffit is lined with v-jointed timber boards with meshed ventilation slots.

Entry is at either end of the verandah via steel and timber stairs to glazed timber doors. The verandah has a timber floor and a timber v-jointed board ceiling. The wall between the verandah and the classroom is single skin with the framing, which has chamfered edges, exposed into the verandah. The verandah wall has timber-framed colonial-hung sashes with awning sash fanlights. Original double leaf timber doors with original hardware open into the classroom at both ends of the verandah. The classroom is a large space with a timber floor and the walls and coved ceiling are lined with timber v-jointed boards. An iron tie rod is exposed within the space at ceiling level. The ceiling has a central ventilation opening. The windows retain original hardware.

To the east nearby is a timber-framed pavilion used as a tennis shed. This measures approximately 3.7 by 2.4 metres (12.1 ft × 7.9 ft), is open on one side, and is clad with weatherboards. It has a timber-framed skillion roof clad with corrugated metal sheets, is unlined internally, and has two unglazed window openings. This pavilion is probably the teacher's room added to the open-air annexe in 1929 and removed in 1975.

Also on the site are a steel and concrete library building (1975), a steel and concrete covered games area (1983), and a steel and concrete multi-purpose hall (2012); none of which are of cultural heritage significance.

=== The Grounds ===
The school grounds are banked and levelled to create playing areas and incorporate long, low concrete retaining walls. Large, mature trees, including pepperinas (Schinus molle), camphor laurels (Cinnamomum camphora), and jacarandas (Jacaranda mimosifolia) stand within the grounds. A timber seat around the base of a camphor laurel has memorial plaques mounted on it. The plaques are dedicated to past students who have died. A stone cairn with a plaque, a memorial of the 1965 centenary, stands in the garden near the front stair of the main building below a steel flagpole attached to the stair balustrade. Behind the main building is a large bitumen parade area.

== Heritage listing ==
Toowoomba South State School was listed on the Queensland Heritage Register on 2 December 2013 having satisfied the following criteria.

The place is important in demonstrating the evolution or pattern of Queensland's history.

Toowoomba South State School (established in 1865 as Toowoomba National School) is important in demonstrating the evolution of state education in Queensland and the associated evolution of government education architecture. One of the oldest public schools established in Queensland, Toowoomba South State School retains a significant complex of buildings and landscape elements that illustrate the development of government education philosophies from the 1880s to the 1950s.

Reserved for school purposes in 1853, the important buildings and landscape elements from the 1880s to the 1950s demonstrate the growth and development of Toowoomba as a major regional centre in Queensland.

The place demonstrates rare, uncommon or endangered aspects of Queensland's cultural heritage.

The open-air annexe at Toowoomba South State School, which remains relatively intact, is rare as one of the few surviving examples of this once common type.

The Oslo Lunch Room, which also remains relatively intact, is and has always been uncommon as only a few buildings were built to this standard design and survived subsequent periods of development and change.

The place is important in demonstrating the principal characteristics of a particular class of cultural places.

Toowoomba South State School is important in demonstrating the principal characteristics of Queensland state schools, comprising a complex of buildings constructed to standard designs by the Department of Public Works, and standing on a large, landscaped site with buildings positioned to allow natural ventilation and daylighting of the interiors.

The place retains good, representative examples of standard government designs that were architectural responses to the prevailing government educational philosophies. In particular, the standard designs represented at Toowoomba are:

the playshed with its open sides, hipped timber-framed roof form supported on braced, timber posts and fixed timber perimeter seating;

the open-air annexe with its timber-framed and clad construction, west facing verandah, large single classroom that is well ventilated and daylit, timber linings and iron tie rod;

the Oslo Lunch Room with its timber-framed and sheet and battens clad construction, north facing verandah, south-facing fenestration and interior sheets and battens linings;

the main building with its neo-classical styling, three-storeyed form, high-quality design, materials and construction, plan layout with north facing corridor, teacher's rooms, hat and cloak rooms, south facing classrooms that are well ventilated and daylit and understorey play space;

and the Wadley Wing with its high-set form, gable roof, composite structural system and cladding, north facing verandah, south facing classrooms that are well ventilated and daylit and understorey play space.

The place is important because of its aesthetic significance.

The place is important for its aesthetic significance brought about by the intact main building with its neo-classical styling (including proportions, scale, composition and detail), and its high-quality design, construction and materials. The place also has landmark attributes being sited on a major thoroughfare and contributes to the townscape of Toowoomba.

The place has a strong or special association with a particular community or cultural group for social, cultural or spiritual reasons.

Toowoomba South State School has a strong, special, and ongoing association with the Toowoomba community. It was established through the efforts and funds of the people of the town in 1865 and has taught generations of Toowoomba children. The place is important for its contribution to the educational development of Toowoomba and is a prominent community focal point and gathering place for social events with widespread community support.

== Alumni ==
- Glynis Nunn (Saunders), Olympic heptathlon Gold Medalist 1984
- Edwin John Godsall, 38th Mayor of Toowoomba
