= Concordia Lutheran College =

Coordinates: 27°34′26.61″S 151°55′46.17″E

- Toowoomba, Queensland; Australia

Information
- Type: Independent, co-educational, day & boarding
- Motto: Latin: Nisi Dominus Frustra (Without the Lord, all is in vain)
- Denomination: Lutheran
- Established: 1946
- Principal: Anton Prinsloo
- Chaplain: Thomas Bohmert
- Employees: 96
- Enrolment: 760 (K–12)
- Colours: Blue, red & gold
- Website: www.concordia.qld.edu.au

Concordia Lutheran College is an independent, co-educational, day and boarding school of the Lutheran Church of Australia, located in Toowoomba on the Darling Downs of Queensland, Australia.

Concordia Memorial College was renamed Concordia College and later renamed Concordia Lutheran College, after merging with Martin Luther Primary School and Concordia Primary School.

It is made up of Hume Street Campus (formerly Martin Luther Primary School), Warwick Street Campus (formerly Concordia Primary School) and Stephen Street Campus (formerly Redlands Campus). Stephen Street Campus is the site of the heritage listed Redlands building).

Concordia participates in Rotary International's Interact Club program, in which students raise money and volunteer for various programs and charities in the school, the wider community and internationally.

Concordia's students frequently participate in charity events such as The Cancer Council's Relay For Life, World Vision's 40 Hour Famine as well as sponsoring a child, also through World Vision.

== Curriculum ==
Concordia's Students study a variety of subjects in a range of categories including: Arts, Sciences, sports, Numeracy, Literacy, Languages, Studies of Society and Environment, Religious Education, Business, Technology, Furnishing and Metalwork. TAFE, University Headstart and Work Experience Programs are also frequently undertaken.

Concordia offers an Independent Learning Centre, where students can choose to study a unit of their choice (e.g., World War I, The Mona Lisa, fashion design). In this program, students select and learn from units related to their future careers.

In 2007, Concordia was ranked among the 20 best schools in Queensland, from year 12 Overall Position results.

== Sport ==
As with most Australian schools, Concordia Lutheran College uses a house system. The three houses of the college are:

- Altus – Red
- Kessler – White
- Stedman – Yellow

General Sporting days were held on Wednesdays until 2019, however many students choose to participate in extracurricular sporting teams such as 'Wednesday Night Volleyball' and 'Friday Night Basketball'

Annually, Concordia holds an athletics carnival, usually in the third term. A swimming carnival is held in the first term along with cross-country events in the first or second term. Concordia also competes in Regional and Inter-Lutheran sporting events in Athletics, Cross Country and swimming. These are generally held in Brisbane and are contended by many Lutheran schools from South East Queensland. There are also two sport captains nominated each year. The two captains participate in and run many events throughout the year.

== Principals / Head of College ==
Name	Term
Principal
1. Professor Rudolph D. Altus	1946–1947
2. Pastor B. K. R. Haebich (Acting principal)	1948
3. Pastor Hermann E. Temme	1949–1960
4. Professor Robert Johnston	1961–1964
5. Owen James (Jim) Janetzki	1965–1989
6. David Roy Woodrow AM	1990–1994
7. Michael Brew-Bevan (Acting principal)	1995
8. Ian Mibus	1996–2004
9. Michael Kaiser	2005–2007
Head of College
9. Michael Kaiser	2007–2017
10. Adrian Wiles	2018–2021
11. Anton Prinsloo	2021–present

== See also ==
- List of schools in Queensland
