= Oakey–Cooyar Road =

Road in Queensland, Australia

Oakey–Cooyar Road Queensland

General information
- Type: Rural road
- Length: 58.8 km (37 mi)
- Route number(s): State Route 68

Major junctions
- South end: Warrego Highway Oakey
- Pechey–Maclagan Road; Dalby–Cooyar Road
- North end: New England Highway Wutul

Location(s)
- Major settlements: Balgowan, Kulpi, Highgrove, Nutgrove

Oakey–Cooyar Road is a continuous 58.8 kilometres (36.5 mi) road route in the Darling Downs and Toowoomba regions of Queensland, Australia. The entire route is signed as State Route 68. It is a state-controlled part regional and part district road (number 417). It provides an alternate route between the Warrego Highway and the New England Highway, bypassing Toowoomba.

== Route description ==
The Department of Transport and Main Roads (TMR) defines a single point in Oakey at which all of its local roads start and end, or pass through to other end points. The former route of the Warrego Highway through the town, now known as Oakey Connection Road (see below) is the basis from which other roads emanate. Thus the Oakey–Cooyar Road starts at its junction with Oakey Connection Road, which is the TMR designated point. State Route 68 does not end at that point, but follows Oakey Connection Road and Oakey–Pittsworth Road until it meets the Warrego Highway. For convenience this article describes the full length of State Route 68.

The road commences at an intersection with the Warrego Highway in Oakey. It runs generally north through Oakey, following Oakey–Pittsworth Road, Aubigny Road, Campbell Street and Bridge Street until it reaches the TMR designated point where Oakey–Cooyar Road leaves the Oakey Connection Road. (Note: Campbell Street and Bridge Street are part of Oakey Connection Road. Aubigny Road is part of Oakey–Pittsworth Road.) It crosses the railway line and continues out of town as Davidson Street and Blake Road before becoming Oakey–Cooyar Road as it passes the Oakey Army Aviation Centre.

It runs north through rich crop-growing land until it reaches the Pechey–Maclagan Road in Highland Plains, where it turns west then north, north-west and north as Pechey–Maclagan Road. Here it passes the New Acland coal mine and runs through the locality of Balgowan. This road eventually exits to the west in Rosalie Plains while Oakey–Cooyar road continues north. It then turns north-east through Kulpi, Evergreen and Highgrove, passing the Haden–Peranga Road in Evergreen.

The road continues generally north through increasingly hilly country until it passes the Muntapa Tunnel and reaches the Dalby–Cooyar Road in Nutgrove. From there it continues north-east through Wutul, where it ends at an intersection with the New England Highway.

== Road condition ==
The road is fully sealed. It has a distance of about 3.3 kilometres (2.1 mi) with an incline greater than 5%. The road crosses the Great Dividing Range just south of Nutgrove, at an elevation of 681 metres (2,234 ft) above sea level.

== History ==
Pastoral runs were taken up in the areas around Oakey from the early 1840s. These included Jondaryan to the west, and Goombungee and Rosalie Plains to the north. Further north, Kulpi and Peranga were outstations of Rosalie Plains. A pastoral run was also established at Cooyar.

The Western railway line opened from Toowoomba to Dalby in 1868, with a station at Oakey, allowing the town to grow as a centre of commerce for properties around it. In 1877 large amounts of land were resumed from several pastoral runs and made available for selection, with the aim of establishing many small farms in the more accessible areas. These resumptions included 11,500 acres (4,700 ha) from Rosalie Plains and 18,500 acres (7,500 ha) from Cooyar.

Early roads to the north of Oakey were cut to enable access to the pastoral runs and their outstations. With the advent of small farms and towns came a need for more and better roads. Road construction and maintenance was difficult on the rich soils of the Darling Downs, leading to requests for a railway. While waiting for a railway, which did not arrive until 1912–13, many improvements were made to the roads. The railway operated until 1964, when improvements in road construction and motor vehicle reliability rendered it non-competitive.

== Oakey Connection Road ==
Oakey Connection Road
- Location: Warrego Highway, Oakey
- Length: 7.3 km (4.5 mi)

Oakey Connection Road is a state-controlled district road (number 326), part of which is rated as a local road of regional significance (LRRS). It runs from the Warrego Highway in Oakey (northwest of the town) through the town before returning to the highway southeast of the town, a distance of 7.3 kilometres (4.5 mi). It intersects with Oakey–Cooyar Road and Oakey–Pittsworth Road in the town.

== Major intersections ==
All distances are from Google Maps.

LGA	Location	km	mi	Destinations	Notes
Darling Downs	Oakey	0	0.0	Warrego Highway – east – Toowoomba – west – Dalby	Southern end of Oakey–Cooyar Road (State Route 68)
Toowoomba	Highland Plains	19.4	12.1	Pechey–Maclagan Road – east – Goombungee, Pechey and New England Highway	Road turns west as Pechey–Maclagan Road
Toowoomba	Rosalie Plains	29.5	18.3	Pechey–Maclagan Road – west – Brymaroo, Quinalow, Maclagan	Road continues north as Oakey–Cooyar Road
Toowoomba	Evergreen	37.2– 38.0	23.1– 23.6	Haden–Peranga Road – west – Peranga – east – Haden	Road continues north-east as Oakey-Cooyar Road
Toowoomba	Nutgrove	52.8	32.8	Dalby–Cooyar Road – west – Maclagan, Dalby	Road continues north-east as Oakey–Cooyar Road
Toowoomba	Wutul	58.8	36.5	New England Highway – north – Cooyar, Yarraman – south – Crows Nest, Hampton, Toowoomba	Northern end of Oakey–Cooyar Road (State Route 68). The town of Cooyar is about 6 kilometres (3.7 mi) north of the intersection.
1.000 mi = 1.609 km; 1.000 km = 0.621 mi: Route transition

== See also ==
- List of road routes in Queensland
- List of numbered roads in Queensland
- Jondaryan Woolshed
