= Pechey–Maclagan Road =

Road in Queensland, Australia

Pechey–Maclagan Road Queensland

General information
- Type: Rural road
- Length: 65.3 km (41 mi)
- Route number(s): No shield

Major junctions
- East end: New England Highway Pechey
- Groomsville Road; Kingsthorpe–Haden Road; Oakey–Cooyar Road; Jondaryan–Nungil Road; Brymaroo–Irvingdale Road; Quinalow–Peranga Road
- North-west end: Dalby–Cooyar Road Maclagan

Location(s)
- Major settlements: Goombungee, Rosalie Plains, Brymaroo, Quinalow

The roads that join the towns of Dalby, Toowoomba and Cooyar form a triangle that encloses some of the most fertile land on the Darling Downs in Queensland, Australia. These roads are the Warrego Highway, New England Highway and Dalby–Cooyar Road. Pechey–Maclagan Road forms a large part of a group of roads that bisect the triangle from east to west, and is also part of one of the groups of roads that bisect from south to north.

Pechey–Maclagan Road is a continuous 65.3 kilometres (40.6 mi) road route in the Toowoomba region of Queensland. It is a state-controlled district road (number 418), rated as a local road of regional significance (LRRS). The east-west section of this road is part of the shortest route from Crows Nest to Dalby.

== Route description ==
The Pechey–Maclagan Road commences at an intersection with the New England Highway (A3) in Pechey. It runs north-west and then south-west, leaving Pechey and running through Whichello from east to south. It crosses Groomsville from north-east to north-west, passing the exit to Groomsville Road. It then passes through Douglas from east to west and enters Goombungee. It enters the town from the east as Lilly Street, turns north on Mocatta Street, and exits to the west as Cooke Street, which soon again becomes Pechey–Maclagan Road. Exits to Kingsthorpe–Haden Road run north and south from the town.

The road enters Highland Plains and meets the Oakey–Cooyar Road (State Route 68). It then runs north-west through Balgowan concurrent with Oakey–Cooyar Road and enters Rosalie Plains. Here it turns west and Oakey–Cooyar Road continues north. It enters Brymaroo and turns north at an intersection with Jondaryan–Nungil Road and Brymaroo–Irvingdale Road. The Brymaroo military aerodrome is near this intersection. Further north it turns west and then north again, entering Quinalow from the south. It passes the exit to Quinalow–Peranga Road before meeting the Dalby–Cooyar Road on the southern boundary of Maclagan, where it ends.

Land use along this road is mixed farming to the east and mainly crop farming to the centre and west.

== Significant connecting roads ==
=== Kingsthorpe–Haden Road ===
This road forms the greater part of a south-north corridor from Kingsthorpe on the Warrego Highway to either Glenaven on the New England Highway or Evergreen on the Oakey–Cooyar Road.

=== Oakey–Cooyar Road ===
This road forms a south-north corridor from Oakey on the Warrego Highway to Cooyar on the New England Highway.

=== Jondaryan–Nungil Road ===
This road, in conjunction with Pechey–Maclagan Road, forms a south-north corridor from Jondaryan on the Warrego Highway to Maclagan and the Bunya Mountains.

=== Brymaroo–Irvingdale Road ===
This road, in conjunction with Pechey–Maclagan Road and Dalby–Nungil Road, forms an east-west corridor from Pechey to Dalby.

== History ==
The first industry in the Crows Nest district was timber cutting. The site where the town is located became a rest stop for bullock teams carrying logs to sawmills in or near Toowoomba The track they followed along the top of the Great Dividing Range eventually became the New England Highway. Settlement occurred along this road and to the west as land became available. Pechey, a small village on the road to Toowoomba, was named for Edward Wilmot Pechey, who owned sawmills in Crows Nest and Toowoomba.

Goombungee pastoral run was established in 1854. The main homestead area soon became a small town, and roads were cut from there to provide access to sources of supply, markets for products, and outstations of the property. One such road linked the town to the then Toowoomba–Crows Nest Road at Pechey.

Rosalie Plains pastoral run was established in the 1840s. It included outstations further north at Kulpi and Peranga. As at Goombungee, roads were cut to access suppliers, markets, and outstations. In 1877 11,500 acres (4,700 ha) was resumed from Rosalie Plains and made available for selection to enable the establishment of many small farms. This in turn increased the need for reliable roads.

In 1889 the town that is now Maclagan was surveyed, and a butter and cheese factory was established in Quinalow. Reliable road connections from these towns were needed to provide access to markets and suppliers.

The former Shire of Rosalie, which existed from 1879 to 2008, was based in Goombungee. It was responsible for turning the original bush tracks of the area into gazetted roads, and for developing and maintaining them.

== Major intersections ==
All distances are from Google Maps. This road is entirely within the Toowoomba local government area.

Location	km	mi	Destinations	Notes
Pechey	0	0.0	New England Highway – north – Crows Nest – south – Hampton	Eastern end of Pechey–Maclagan Road.
Groomsville	10.8	6.7	Groomsville Road – south – Geham, New England Highway	
Goombungee	21.0– 21.5	13.0– 13.4	Kingsthorpe–Haden Road – south – Kingsthorpe, Warrego Highway – north – Haden	Road turns north, then west.
Highland Plains	33.0	20.5	Oakey–Cooyar Road – south – Greenwood	Eastern concurrency terminus with Oakey–Cooyar Road.
Rosalie Plains	43.1	26.8	Oakey–Cooyar Road – north – Kulpi	Western concurrency terminus with Oakey–Cooyar Road. Road turns west.
Brymaroo	49.8	30.9	Jondaryan–Nungil Road – south – Jondaryan, Warrego Highway; Brymaroo–Irvingdale Road – west – Irvingdale	Road turns north.
Quinalow	63.8	39.6	Quinalow–Peranga Road – east – Peranga	
Quinalow / Maclagan midpoint	65.3	40.6	Dalby–Cooyar Road – west – Kaimkillenbun – north – Maclagan	North-western end of Pechey–Maclagan Road.
1.000 mi = 1.609 km; 1.000 km = 0.621 mi: Concurrency terminus

== See also ==
- List of road routes in Queensland
- List of numbered roads in Queensland
