= Acland, Queensland =

Acland
- Town
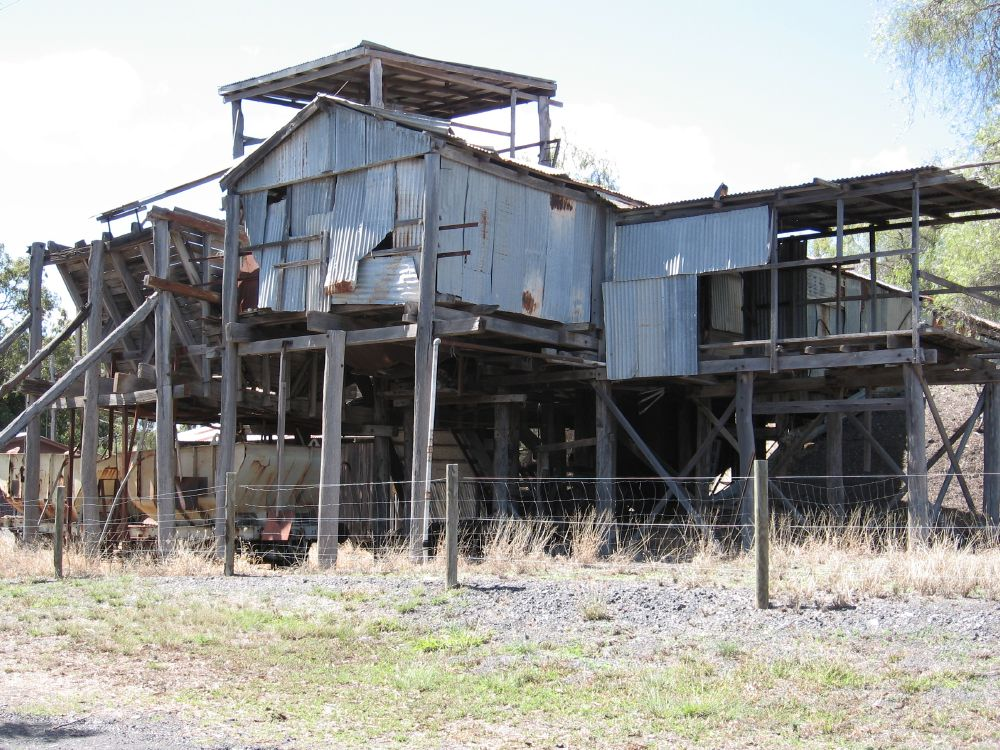
- Acland No. 2 Colliery, 2006

- Interactive map of Acland
- Coordinates: 27.3047°S 151.6902°E
- Country: Australia
- State: Queensland
- LGA: Toowoomba Region
- Location: 22.0 km (13.7 mi) NNW of Oakey; 49.5 km (30.8 mi) NW of Toowoomba CBD; 181 km (112 mi) W of Brisbane
- Established: 1912

Government
  - State electorate: Condamine
  - Federal division: Groom

Area
  - Total: 38.3 km^{2} (14.8 sq mi)

Population
  - Total: 3 (2021 census)
  - Density: 0.078/km^{2} (0.20/sq mi)
- Time zone: UTC+10:00 (AEST)
- Postcode: 4401
Localities around Acland
Jondaryan	Muldu	Highland Plains
Jondaryan	Acland	Silverleigh; Greenwood
Jondaryan	Devon Park	Sabine

Acland is a rural town and locality in the Toowoomba Region, Queensland, Australia. In the 2021 census, the locality of Acland had a population of 3 people.

Originally built to support what would become Queensland's oldest continuously worked coal mine, the town had a population of between 200 and 400 prior to the mine being shut down in 1984. In 2008 almost all properties comprising the town were purchased by the new mine operators with the intention that they be demolished as the open cut mine expands into the town site. By 2009 there was only one remaining resident, Glenn Beutel, who had refused the company's offer to purchase his property.

== Geography ==
Acland is north of Oakey, on the Darling Downs, 160 kilometres (100 mi) west of Queensland's state capital, Brisbane.

It lies in pasture country where there has been some dairy farming, horse breeding and coal mining. Rainfall was measured at the post office between 1912 and 1993, recording an average annual rainfall of 690 millimetres (27 in).

== History ==
The town of Acland is believed to be named by then Commission of Railways, Charles Barnard Evans, whose mother's maiden was Acland. It was originally known as Lagoon Creek.

Lagoon Creek Provisional School opened on 22 July 1885. On 1 January 1909 it became Lagoon Creek State School. From 1915 to 1920 it was called Acland State School. It closed on 31 August 1930.

Acland town developed following the mining of coal in the area by the Acland Coal Company. The town had a police officer by 1913, at which time there was also a primary school nearby, known as Lagoon Creek. Acland Railway Station Post Office opened on 1 May 1913. It was replaced by Acland Post Office in 1969, which closed October 1998.

Acland State School opened on 28 February 1921. A declining population meant the primary school had just 12 students by 2004 and it was mothballed in December 2004. It was permanently closed on 24 August 2005. The school faced Allen Street and was bounded by Allen Street, William Street, Bellevue Street and South Streets (27.3054°S 151.6918°E).

The Acland number two colliery opened in 1929, and in the 1940s and 1950s it employed 52 people.

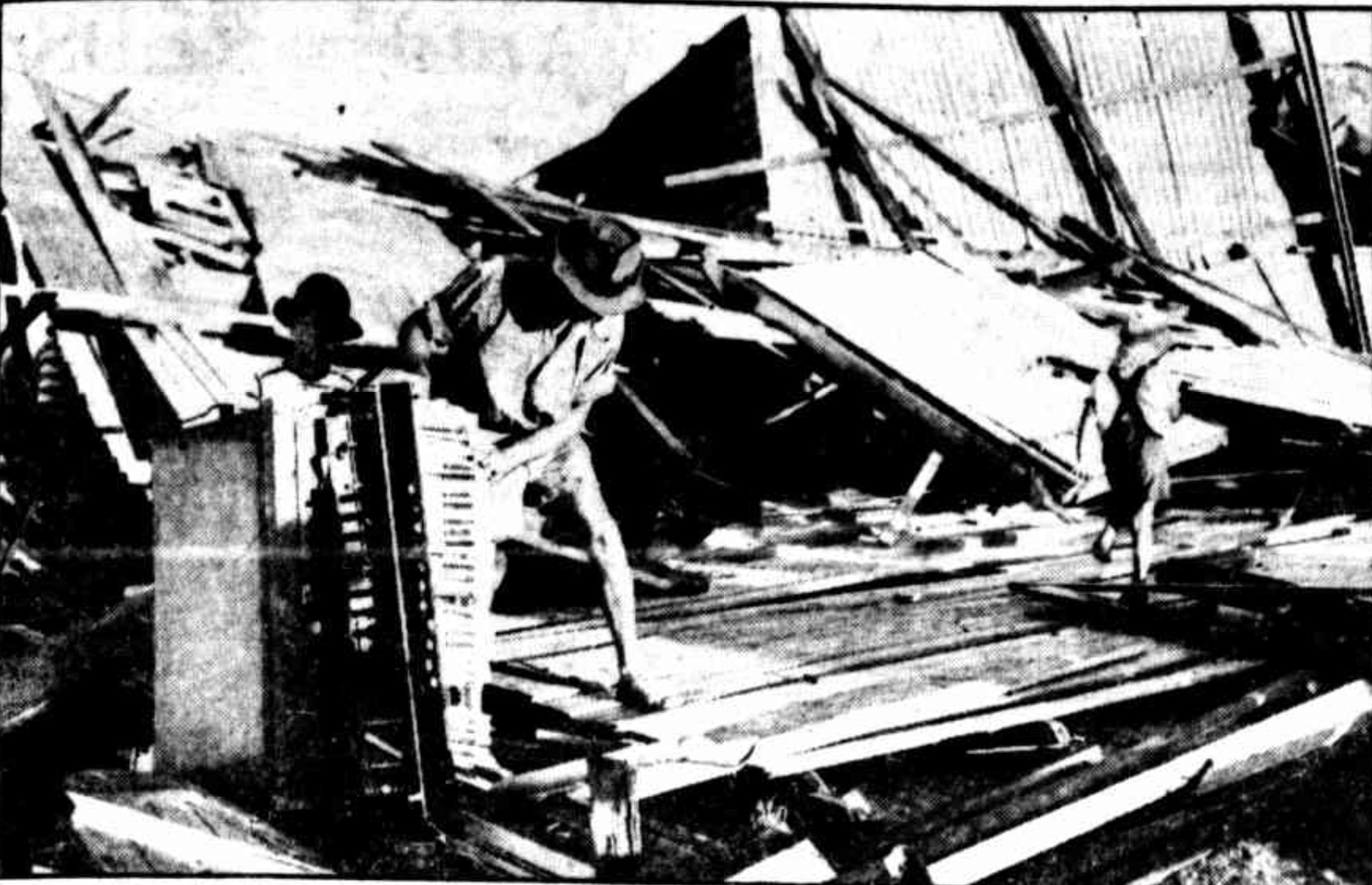
Church of England in Acland after the tornado of 6 December 1952.

On Saturday 8 December 1952, most of the buildings in the town were damaged by a tornado. The Anglican Church, the Presbyterian Church, the public hall and butcher's shop were all destroyed beyond repair.

St Jude's Anglican Church was dedicated on 21 June 1953 by Reverend Rupert Warner Shand. The church had been rebuilt after the previous church was destroyed by the tornado in December 1952. Its closure on 5 December 2006 was approved by Venerable G. F. Harch, Archdeacon of The Downs. In June 2015, it was relocated to the Jondaryan Woolshed to be used as a wedding chapel there.

By 1971, with demand for coal for transport in decline, Acland was home to the only remaining coalmine on the Darling Downs. The mine was Queensland's "oldest and smallest continuously worked coal mine" at the time of its closure in 1984. The old colliery is state heritage-listed, being "the most intact mine site of its age and type in Queensland". From the mine's closure in 1984, to the sale of the site to the Shire of Rosalie in 2000, the workings were operated as a mining museum by Kath and John Greenhalgh, the owners of the farm on which the mine was located. In September 2006 Kath & John Greenhalgh sold the land to New Acland Pastoral Company.

In the 1980s Acland was a six-time winner of the Queensland Tidy Town Award for towns with a population between 200 and 400, and the inaugural overall Tidy Town prize in 1989.

In 1999, New Hope Coal moved into the area and established the New Acland Mine, an open cut coal mine that since 2005 has been New Hope's main coal producing operation. Anticipating major expansion, the company began to purchase houses in Acland in advance of the area becoming an open cut mine pit, expected to produce 10 million tonnes of coal each year. Ahead of the mine's development, several Queensland bottle trees were prepared for transplantation to the new National Arboretum in Canberra.

Acland reported a population of just 53 in the 2006 census.

In December 2008 Glenn Beutel was the only remaining homeowner, having rejected the company's offer to purchase his house. In mid-2010 Beutel continued to resist the company's offers, and was reported to still be maintaining the local park established by his parents. On Monday 4 June 2012, during a live broadcast of ABC TV show Q&A from Toowoomba's Empire Theatre, a question was asked by an audience member which made reference to Glenn Beutel being the last resident of Acland.

== Demographics ==
In the 2016 census, the locality of Acland had a population of 32 people.

In the 2021 census, the locality of Acland had a population of 3 people.

== Heritage listings ==
Acland has a number of heritage-listed sites, including:

- 2 Francis Street: Acland No. 2 Colliery

== Education ==
There are no schools in Acland. The nearest government primary schools are Jondaryan State School in neighbouring Jondaryan to the south-east, Oakey State School in Oakey to the south, Goombungee State School in Goombungee to the east, and Kulpi State School in Kulpi to the north-west. The nearest government secondary school is Oakey State High School in Oakey to the south.

== Notable people ==
Australian radio broadcaster, Alan Jones attended Acland State School from 1946.

== See also ==
- Wollar, New South Wales
