= Doctor Creek, Queensland =

Doctor Creek
- Suburb
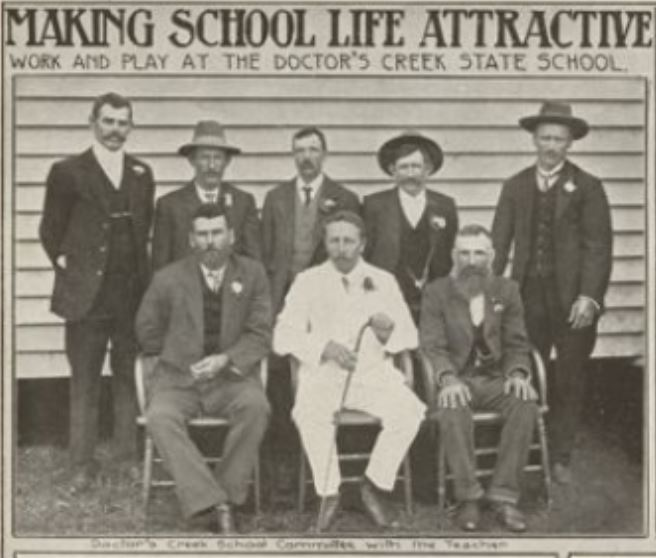
- Doctor's Creek School Committee with the teacher, 1915

- Interactive map of Doctor Creek
- Coordinates: 27.1808°S 151.8086°E
- Country: Australia
- State: Queensland
- LGA: Toowoomba Region
- Location: 36.4 km (22.6 mi) NNE of Oakey; 38.2 km (23.7 mi) NNW of Highfields; 52.3 km (32.5 mi) NNW of Toowoomba CBD; 178 km (111 mi) WNW of Brisbane

Government
  - State electorate: Condamine
  - Federal division: Groom

Area
  - Total: 30.9 km^{2} (11.9 sq mi)

Population
  - Total: 28 (2021 census)
  - Density: 0.906/km^{2} (2.35/sq mi)
- Time zone: UTC+10:00 (AEST)
- Postcode: 4352
Suburbs around Doctor Creek
Highgrove	Coalbank	Djuan
Evergreen	Doctor Creek	Haden
Mount Darry	Mount Darry	Kilbirnie

Doctor Creek is a rural locality in the Toowoomba Region, Queensland, Australia. In the 2021 census, Doctor Creek had a population of 28 people.

== Geography ==
The Great Dividing Range passes through the north of the locality and then forms the north-eastern boundary of the locality. The locality is part of the Murray Darling drainage basin within the Condamine River catchment.

Cookes Hill is in the north-east of the locality (27.1618°S 151.8265°E), rising to 738 metres (2,421 ft) above sea level.

The eastern and south-eastern boundaries loosely follows Scrubby Creek.

The creek Doctor Creek from which the locality presumably takes its name does not flow through the locality, but rises and flows through neighbouring Haden to the west.

The Haden Peranga Road enters the locality from the south-east (Kilbirnie), forms part of the south-western boundary of the suburb and exits to the west (Evergreen).

The land use is mostly grazing on native vegetation with some crop growing.

== History ==
On Saturday 16 January 1892, a public meeting was called to plan the establishment of a school. In June 1892, tenders were called to erect a provisional school building. Doctor's Creek Provisional School opened on 30 January 1893 with picnic to celebrate its opening on Friday 10 February 1893. The first teacher was Mr Ridler. The school building was 21 by 14 feet (6.4 by 4.3 m) and was built by Mr Maunder of Meringandan. On 2 April 1900, it became Doctor's Creek State School. In preparation for the state school, tenders were called in June 1899 to erect a state school building and to convert the existing provisional school building into a teacher's residence. The school closed in 1963. It was at 327 Haden Peranga Road (south-west corner with Whites Road, now within neighbouring Haden, 27.2087°S 151.8589°E). The school teacher's residence still exists on the site.

In 1903, St Paul's Lutheran church was established at 273 Haden Peranga Road (south-east corner with Whites Road, now within neighbouring Haden, 27.2087°S 151.8598°E). The first Lutheran settlers came to the district in 1888 but it was not until 1902 that a Lutheran congregation was formed as part of the United German and Scandinavian Synod of Queensland. At the congregation's first meeting on 23 March 1903, it was decided to build a church. The church was dedicated on 29 November 1903 by Reverend George Heuer of Toowoomba, the president of the Queensland synod.

During World War I due to anti-German sentiment, the Lutheran church's pastor Reverend Gustav Fischer was interned from circa June 1916 to circa February 1919. Fischer was born in Australia as were his parents, but he was educated in Germany.

== Demographics ==
In the 2016 census, Doctor Creek had a population of 37 people.

In the 2021 census, Doctor Creek had a population of 28 people.

== Education ==
There are no schools in Doctor Creek. The nearest government primary schools are Kulpi State School in Kulpi to the south-west and Haden State School in neighbouring Haden to the south-east. The nearest government secondary schools are:

- Quinalow State School (to Year 10) in Quinalow to the north-west
- Oakey State High School (to Year 12) in Oakey to the south
- Highfields State Secondary College (to Year 12) in Highfields to the south-east
- Crow's Nest State School (to Year 10) in Crows Nest to the south-east
