= Muldu, Queensland =

Muldu
- Suburb
- Interactive map of Muldu
- Coordinates: 27.2702°S 151.6805°E
- Country: Australia
- State: Queensland
- LGA: Toowoomba Region
- Location: 29.4 km (18.3 mi) N of Oakey; 55.6 km (34.5 mi) ESE of Dalby; 56.9 km (35.4 mi) NW of Toowoomba CBD; 186 km (116 mi) W of Brisbane CBD

Government
  - State electorate: Condamine
  - Federal division: Groom

Area
  - Total: 19.0 km^{2} (7.3 sq mi)

Population
  - Total: 0 (2021 census)
  - Density: 0.000/km^{2} (0.00/sq mi)
- Time zone: UTC+10:00 (AEST)
- Postcode: 4401
Suburbs around Muldu
Brymaroo	Balgowan	Balgowan
Brymaroo	Muldu	Highland Plains
Jondaryan	Acland	Acland

Muldu is a rural locality in the Toowoomba Region, Queensland, Australia. In the 2021 census, Muldu had "no people or a very low population".

== History ==
Muldu is an Aboriginal word, meaning "shade". It was originally assigned to the Muldu railway station by the Queensland Railways Department on 24 November 1911.

Muldu State School opened on 3 September 1917 and closed in 1966. It was on a 3-acre (1.2 ha) site at 123 Muldu Plainview Road (27.26910°S 151.68733°E).

== Demographics ==
In the 2016 census, Muldu had a population of three.

In the 2021 census, Muldu had "no people or a very low population".

== Education ==
There are no schools in Muldu. The nearest government primary school is Kulpi State School in Kulpi to the north. The nearest government secondary schools are Quinalow State School (to Year 12) in Quinalow to the north-west and Oakey State High School in Oakey to the south. There is also a Catholic primary school in Oakey.
