= Highland Plains, Queensland (Toowoomba Region) =

Highland Plains
- Suburb
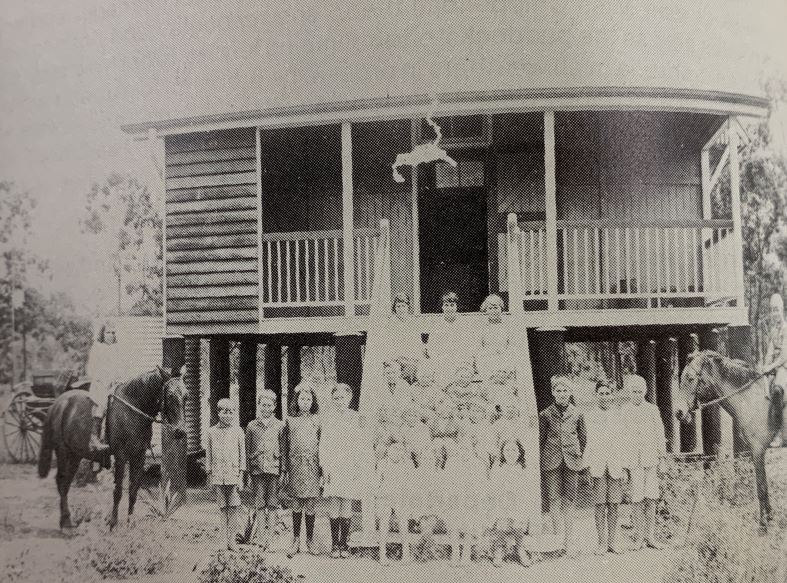
- Highland Plains School (1918-1945)

- Interactive map of Highland Plains
- Coordinates: 27.2744°S 151.7597°E
- Country: Australia
- State: Queensland
- LGA: Toowoomba Region
- Location: 12.6 km (7.8 mi) WNW of Goombungee; 21.6 km (13.4 mi) N of Oakey; 48.7 km (30.3 mi) NW of Toowoomba CBD; 176 km (109 mi) WNW of Brisbane

Government
  - State electorate: Condamine
  - Federal division: Groom

Area
  - Total: 58.0 km^{2} (22.4 sq mi)

Population
  - Total: 60 (2021 census)
  - Density: 1.03/km^{2} (2.68/sq mi)
- Time zone: UTC+10:00 (AEST)
- Postcode: 4401
Suburbs around Highland Plains
Rosalie Plains	Mount Darry	Kilbirnie
Balgowan; Muldu	Highland Plains	Goombungee
Acland	Silverleigh	Goombungee

Highland Plains is a rural locality in the Toowoomba Region, Queensland, Australia. In the 2021 census, Highland Plains had a population of 60 people.

== Geography ==
The Oakey–Cooyar Road runs through from south to west, locally known as Pechey - Maclagan Road from where it turns west. Pechey - Maclagan Road enters from the south-east and joins Oakey–Cooyar Road.

There are coal mines in the south-west of the locality operated by New Acland Coal Pty Ltd. Apart from these, the rest of the locality is a mix of grazing on native vegetation and crop growing.

== History ==
Local residents applied for a school on 5 July 1916. Highland Plains State School opened on 3 July 1918 under head teacher Alice Rose Randall. It was without a teacher from 10 October 1944, officially closing on 14 May 1945, with the remaining students transferred to Goombungee State School. It was at 622 Highland Plain Road (27.28550°S 151.78319°E).

== Demographics ==
In the 2016 census, Highland Plains had a population of 41 people.

In the 2021 census, Highland Plains had a population of 60 people.

== Education ==
There are no schools in Highland Plains. The nearest government primary schools are Goombungee State School in neighbouring Goombungee to the east, Kulpi State School in Kulpi to the north-west, and Haden State School in Haden to the north-east. The nearest government secondary schools are Quinalow State School (to Year 10) in Quinalow to the north-west and Oakey State High School (to Year 12) in Oakey to the south.
