= Sabine, Queensland =

Rural locality in Queensland, Australia

Sabine
- Suburb
- Interactive map of Sabine
- Coordinates: 27.3530°S 151.7122°E
- Country: Australia
- State: Queensland
- LGA: Toowoomba Region
- Location: 12.0 km (7.5 mi) N of Oakey; 42.5 km (26.4 mi) NW of Toowoomba CBD; 168 km (104 mi) W of Brisbane

Government
  - State electorate: Condamine
  - Federal division: Groom

Area
  - Total: 8.3 km^{2} (3.2 sq mi)

Population
  - Total: 0 (2021 census)
  - Density: 0.00/km^{2} (0.00/sq mi)
- Time zone: UTC+10:00 (AEST)
- Postcode: 4401
Suburbs around Sabine
Acland	Acland	Greenwood
Devon Park	Sabine	Greenwood
Devon Park	Devon Park	Kelvinhaugh

Sabine is a rural locality in the Toowoomba Region, Queensland, Australia. In the 2021 census, Sabine had "no people or a very low population".

== Geography ==
The Oakey–Cooyar Road runs along the eastern boundary of the locality.

The land is relatively flat and is 410 to 430 metres (1,350 to 1,410 ft) above sea level.

The land use is a mixture of crop growing (in the north and west of the locality) and grazing on native vegetation (in the south of the locality).

== History ==
The locality takes its name from its former railway station, named by the Queensland Railways Department, after a pioneer land selector called Sabine.

The Cooyar railway line from Oakey to Kulpi (then known as Rosalie) was opened on 29 April 1912. It entered through the locality from the south-east (present-day Devon Park / Kelvinhaugh) and exited to the north-west (Acland) with the locality served by the Sabine railway station (27.35105°S 151.71001°E). The line was partially closed beyond Acland on 1 May 1964, with the last segment closed on 8 December 1969.

Sabine State School opened on 15 April 1925. It closed circa 1937. It was at 210 Acland Sabine Road (27.33998°S 151.68627°E), now within the present-day locality of Devon Park.

== Demographics ==
In the 2016 census, Sabine had a population of 9 people.

In the 2021 census, Sabine had "no people or a very low population".

== Education ==
There are no schools in Sabine. The nearest government primary and secondary schools are Oakey State School and Oakey State High School, both in Oakey to the south.
