= Balgowan, Queensland =

Balgowan
- Suburb
- Interactive map of Balgowan
- Coordinates: 27.2533°S 151.6944°E
- Country: Australia
- State: Queensland
- LGA: Toowoomba Region
- Location: 23.9 km (14.9 mi) N of Oakey; 51.5 km (32.0 mi) NNW of Toowoomba CBD; 181 km (112 mi) W of Brisbane

Government
  - State electorate: Condamine
  - Federal division: Groom

Area
  - Total: 9.8 km^{2} (3.8 sq mi)

Population
  - Total: 0 (2021 census)
  - Density: 0.00/km^{2} (0.00/sq mi)
- Time zone: UTC+10:00 (AEST)
- Postcode: 4401
Suburbs around Balgowan
Rosalie Plains	Rosalie Plains	Rosalie Plains
Brymaroo	Balgowan	Highland Plains
Muldu	Muldu	Muldu

Balgowan is a rural locality in the Toowoomba Region, Queensland, Australia. In the 2021 census, Balgowan had "no people or a very low population".

== Geography ==
Like much of the Darling Downs, Balgowan is flat agricultural land. It is about 440 metres about sea level and is used for both cropping and grazing, all freehold.

The Oakey–Cooyar Road, locally named Pechey - Maclagan Road, passes through the locality from south-east to north.

== History ==
Tenders were called to erect the school in June 1883. Plainview State School (sometimes written as Plain View State School) opened on 1 December 1884. It closed in December 1921. Tenders were called in 1922 to remove the school residence.

== Demographics ==
In the 2016 census, Balgowan had a population of 14 people.

In the 2021 census, Balgowan had "no people or a very low population".

== Education ==
There are no schools in Balgowan. The nearest government primary school is Kulpi State School in Kulpi to the north. The nearest government secondary schools are Quinalow State School (to Year 10) in Quinalow to the north-west and Oakey State High School (to Year 12) in Oakey to the south. There is also a Catholic primary school in Oakey and there are numerous non-government schools in Toowoomba and its suburbs.
