= Malu, Queensland =

Malu
- Suburb
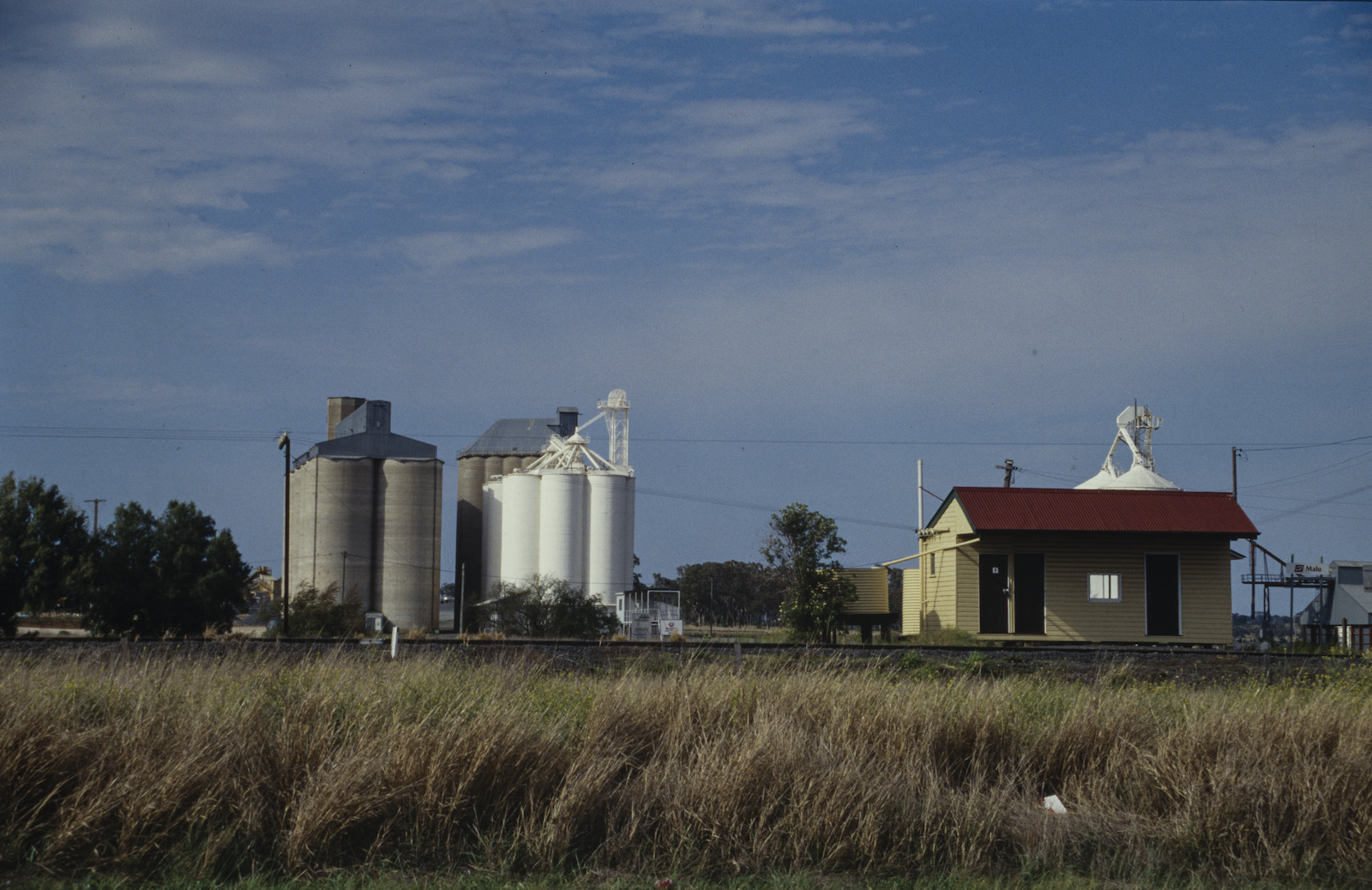
- Large grain silos next to the Malu railway station, 2000

- Interactive map of Malu
- Coordinates: 27.3158°S 151.5822°E
- Country: Australia
- State: Queensland
- LGA: Toowoomba Region
- Location: 22.8 km (14.2 mi) NW of Oakey; 45.3 km (28.1 mi) SE of Dalby; 49.4 km (30.7 mi) NW of Toowoomba CBD; 177 km (110 mi) WNW of Brisbane

Government
  - State electorate: Condamine
  - Federal division: Groom

Area
  - Total: 25.0 km^{2} (9.7 sq mi)

Population
  - Total: 18 (2021 census)
  - Density: 0.720/km^{2} (1.86/sq mi)
- Time zone: UTC+10:00 (AEST)
- Postcode: 4403
Suburbs around Malu
Bowenville	Brymaroo	Brymaroo
Bowenville	Malu	Jondaryan
Bowenville	Jondaryan	Jondaryan

Malu is a rural locality in the Toowoomba Region, Queensland, Australia. In the 2021 census, Malu had a population of 18 people.

== Geography ==
The Western railway line forms the south-west boundary of the locality, entering the locality from south-east (Jondaryan) and exiting to the south-west (Bowenville). The locality is served by Malu railway station (27.3486°S 151.5613°E). The Warrego Highway runs immediately south and parallel to the railway line, entering the locality from south-east (Jondaryan) and exiting to the south-west (Bowenville).

There are grain silos near the railway station operated by GrainCorp. To the north of the grain silos is a quarry which supplies concrete aggregate, bitumen and sealing aggregates, road base and ballast. Apart from these, the land use is a mixture of crop growing and grazing on native vegetation.

== Demographics ==
In the 2016 census, Malu had a population of 18 people.

In the 2021 census, Malu had a population of 18 people.

== Education ==
There are no schools in Malu. The nearest government primary schools are Bowenville State School in neighbouring Bowenville to the west and Jondaryan State School in neighbouring Jondaryan to the south-east. The nearest government secondary schools are Quinalow State School (to Year 10) in Quinalow to the north and Oakey State High School (to Year 12) in Oakey to the south-east. There is also a Catholic primary school in Oakey and other non-government schools in Toowoomba and its suburbs.
