= Acland No. 2 Colliery =

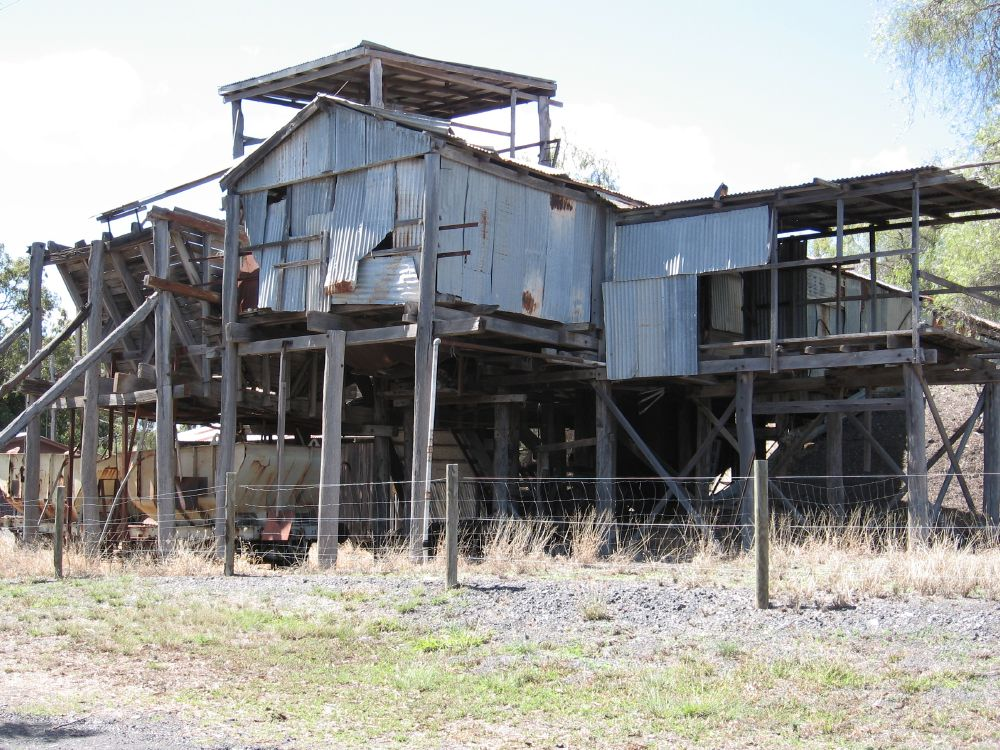
- Acland No. 2 Colliery, 2006

- Location within Queensland Location within Australia
- 27.3001°S 151.6904°E
- Location: 2 Francis Street, Acland, Toowoomba Region, Queensland, Australia

Queensland Heritage Register
- Official name: Acland No. 2 Colliery (former)
- Type: state heritage (archaeological, built)
- Designated: 29 June 2007
- Reference no.: 602599
- Significant period: 1929-1984
- Significant components: store/s / storeroom / storehouse, pit - machinery, hut/shack, loading bay/dock, workshop, tramway, office/s, ventilation system, bathroom/bathhouse, shed/s

Acland No. 2 Colliery is a heritage-listed former mine at 2 Francis Street, Acland, Toowoomba Region, Queensland, Australia. It was added to the Queensland Heritage Register on 29 June 2007.

== History ==
The former Acland No 2 Colliery is a small underground coalmine close to Oakey on the Darling Downs. It comprises most of the above ground structures associated with the mine together with associated machinery, filled in mine portals and spoil heap.

Coal was one of the first minerals in Queensland to be commercially mined. However, development of the coal mining industry was slow. Until the 1950s, coal was produced to supply the local market only: steamships at first; followed by steam locomotives later in the 19th century.

A symbiotic relationship existed between Queensland Government Railways and the coal industry. Queensland Railways was the coal industry's largest customer since coal supplies were essential to the functioning of the rail network. At the same time rail transport was essential to the viability of coalmines: a mine could not survive commercially unless it was directly linked to the rail network. In Queensland, development of the coal industry was closely linked to the growth of the rail network.

From the late 1950s, the industry experienced major change owing to the conversion from steam locomotives to diesel locomotives by Queensland Rail, the rapid growth of the export market and the development of large-scale open cut mining. By the end of the 20th century, Queensland was the nation's largest coal producer and over 90% of the state's coalmines were open cut.

Coal exploration in the eastern Darling Downs was initially stimulated by demand for coal at the locomotive depot in Chinchilla. After a branch line opened between Oakey and Cooyar in c. 1913, mining commenced in the Acland region in the vicinity of the railway line. The first coalmines in the district included Sugarloaf Colliery, Kingsthorpe Mine, Balgowan Colliery, Willaroo Mine and the Acland Coal Company Limited Mine. The Acland No 2 Colliery opened in 1929.

Initially at Acland, coal mining utilised manual methods. Coal was excavated from the mine face and loaded into "skips" using hand implements. The skips were moved manually along an underground tramline to the main underground haul road. Here, they were attached to a steam operated cable and pulley system that hauled them to the pithead.

When the skips arrived at the pithead they passed over a weighbridge. Until the 1950s, the miners' pay was based on the weight of coal that they produced. They used a tag system to identify their skips. The weighbridge and tally desk used for determining the weight of coal each miner excavated survive extant at Acland.

The introduction of electricity in the Oakey area in the late 1940s stimulated increased mechanisation of the area's coalmines. Conversion to more mechanised methods at Acland commenced in the early 1950s.

In 1951, the gauge of the underground tram rail was increased and the tunnels were widened to permit the access of small diesel locomotives. Two Jenbach 15 locomotives were introduced in 1952 together with larger steel skips. Mechanical tipplers (still extant) were installed at the pithead to handle the new steel skips. The tippler was a device for emptying the coal from the skips into the coal processing plant.

In 1953, a new screening plant was installed. Contamination of Acland coal with foreign material had been a source of concern to the mine's customers. The new plant ensured the production of cleaner, graded coal. The screen has now been removed from the mine site.

The new plant also included two elevators of steel construction and a 30-by-4-foot (9.1 by 1.2 m) picking belt. The picking belt was used to facilitate the removal, by hand, of rock from the coal. Oversized pieces of coal could also be manually crushed with hammers. Elsewhere, skip haulage and hand-picking became obsolete but at Acland these methods continued to be used until the mine's closure. The elevators were used to convey the processed coal to the top of the hoppers for loading into train wagons. The picking belt and elevators survive intact at the mine.

The screening plant was driven by seven new electric motors. An electrical switchboard and switching equipment was installed to provide power to the motors.

The haulage system was converted from steam to electricity in 1954 with the installation of a 90-horsepower electric motor winch. The existing steam plant continued to be used for back-up. The steam plant has been removed but the winch room containing the electric winch and associated machinery remains intact.

Further improvements were made between 1955 and the end of the decade. These included installation of a surge bin with a conveyor feed chain under one of the tipplers and a new blacksmith's shop. The gantry was redecked and its roof was raised.

In 1955 and 1956, a new Jenbach diesel locomotive, a Sampson coal cutter and a Sampson coal loader were introduced. By 1958, the mine had a facility for servicing machinery underground. A Minesmobile Loader was purchased in 1973.

Two Jenbach locomotives and a Sampson coal loader displayed at the site were used in the mine. A coal cutter on the site was assembled from spare parts from elsewhere.

From the late 1950s, the small coal mines in the Acland area began to fall victim to the major changes taking place in the coal industry. The demand for coal to supply Queensland Rail, traditionally a major customer of the small mines, dramatically fell during the 1960s owing to the conversion from steam to diesel locomotives. Another key factor was the shift to more efficient large-scale mining leading to the dominance of open cut mines. By 1971, the Acland No 2 Colliery was the only coalmine left on the Darling Downs.

The mine continued to operate until November 1984, supplying coal to the Toowoomba Hospital. When the mine closed, the mine structures were bought by Kath and John Greenhalgh, the owners of the farm on which the mine was located. The Greenhalghs kept the mine intact and opened it as a museum. In 2000, when the Greenhalghs decided to retire from the land, they sold the mine to the Rosalie Shire Council. It ceased to operate as a museum from that time.

The mine has survived almost completely intact. In addition to the tramway system and most of the coal processing plant, most of the ancillary buildings survive. These include the workshops, manager's office, crib room and lamp room complete with battery chargers and miners' lights, explosives store, ventilation shafts and fan rooms, bathroom, switch room and a miner's hut.

== Description ==
The former Acland No.2 Colliery comprises virtually all of the structures and machinery associated with the mine when it was operational. Structures include the mine portals, tramway, pithead, coal handling and processing plant and most of the ancillary buildings.

The pithead structures are located close to eastern side of the main road from Acland and the other structures extend to the north and the east of the pithead. The original mine portal (number 2 portal) is located east of the pithead and the number three portal is located about sixty metres to the north.

=== Tramway ===
The underground workings of the mine were accessed by two portals, which remain extant on the site. These portals have been filled in. The tramline formations and rails connect the underground workings to the pithead and also run to the workshop. Switchgear associated with the tramway remains intact.

Metal tramway wagons, called skips, were used to carry the coal. These remain extant on the site and are currently located in the pithead structure. The skips comprise a simple metal bin mounted on tram wheels. The skips were hauled along the tramway by a cable and pulley system, which is extant except for the cable. Underground, away from the main haul road, diesel locomotives were used to haul the skips. These locomotives are extant at the mine also.

The winch house associated with the cable system is extant on the site just to the north of the pithead. This structure is a brown, chamfer board hut with a corrugated iron roof. The hut contains a large electric motor connected to a belt driven pulley system. The pulleys drive a large metal winding drum. A small section of cable remains connected to the drum. A number of operational signs remain extant on the walls of the hut together with chalked notes dating from the early 1980s.

=== Pithead, loading gantry and picking belt ===
The pithead, loading gantry and picking belt form a large, multi-level timber and corrugated iron structure that dominates the site. The structure contains most of the coal handling machinery. The tramway travels up an embankment and enters a large opening to the south of the structure, the railway siding passes underneath the western end and the loading gantry and picking belt project from the northern side. The floor of the pithead is wooden. Short wooden slats are fastened to the floor between the rails and on the northern side to provide purchase for feet when pushing the skips into position.

On entering the pithead, one of the tramlines crosses a weighbridge. A metal weighing mechanism is located on the northern side of the tracks. A curved, white graduated scale on top of the mechanism faces the track. A wooden podium stands just to the west of this mechanism. The top of the podium is flat and sloped to support an open book.

After crossing the weighbridge, the tramlines enter two tipplers. The tipplers comprise a section of track located between two metal hoops. The whole assembly pivots so when a skip is parked in the tippler, it can be tipped onto its side so the contents can be emptied. The first tippler empties via the space formerly occupied by the screening plant onto the picking belt. The second tippler, located at the western end of the pithead empties via a hopper into a wagon parked on the railway siding.

The picking belt consists of a long conveyor belt. A raised deck runs the length of the southern side of the belt. Workers stood on this deck when sorting rocks from the coal. The gear mechanism and electric motor is located at the northern end of the belt. An electric control panel for the belt is located next to the deck opposite the belt. A second belt is located underneath the picking belt. This conveys the coal back towards the pithead.

From the picking belt, the coal is carried to an elevator. The elevator consists of a chain loop to which is attached a series of metal buckets. The coal falls into the buckets and is conveyed via the chain to the top of the loading gantry. From here, the coal spills into the hopper that feeds the rail wagons parked on the siding.

=== Ancillary buildings ===
==== Workshops ====
The workshops are located to the northeast of the pithead. They comprise two gabled sheds attached to each other. A tramline runs into the western side of the mechanical workshop. This is a brown, corrugated iron building. Two large hinged doors, clad in corrugated iron, provide rail access through the western side. A wooden door opens to the south of this. A second wooden door opens on the opposite side. The building has no windows.

A smaller weatherboard shed is attached to the north side of the mechanical workshop. This is the electrical workshop. A small weatherboard alcove projects from the northern side of the building. Sash windows open into the northern and southern sides of the building. A small two-paned window opens into the alcove. The building has no external doors.

==== Bob's hut ====
A gabled, single roomed hut, clad in corrugated iron and unsealed, is located to the northeast of number three portal. This hut was formerly a miner's residence. The wooden floor of the hut is fixed to bearers that sit directly on the ground. A door opening is located on the southern side of the hut and a window opening on the eastern side. A corrugated iron car port is attached to the eastern side and a stove alcove extends from the southern end next to the door.

==== Mine Manager's Office ====
The former mine manager's office is to the east of the workshop. It is a brown, wooden, weatherboard hut with a gabled, corrugated iron roof. It is elevated on short stumps. A verandah extends the full length of the western side. The verandah does not have a balustrade. Access is via a short staircase. A panelled wooden door opens into the centre of this elevation. Two sashed windows open either side of the door. The opposite (eastern) side of the house has a similar arrangement of door and windows. A ramp provides access to the door on this side. A steel carport of recent construction projects the full length of the eastern side. A water tank is located at each end of the former office.

==== Recent shed ====
Just to the north of the former office is a corrugated iron shed of recent construction. It has a gabled roof and roller doors. A large flat roofed, open sided shed is attached to the side.

==== Bathroom ====
The former bathroom, now a residence, is east of the pithead. This is a long weatherboard building with a gabled, corrugated iron roof. Short gabled projections extend from the eastern and western elevations about halfway along the building. Aluminium sliding windows open into the sides of the building and an aluminium sliding door provides access into the northern end. A hinged door opens into the eastern side, just to the south of the gabled projection.

==== Crib hut and lamp room ====
The former crib hut and lamp room is a small, white weatherboard hut with a gabled corrugated iron roof. The hut is elevated on short stumps. A wooden door provides access into the eastern end. Casement windows open into the sides. The interior of the hut contains three battery chargers used to recharge batteries used in the miners' lamps. One of these chargers still holds miners' lamps. A selection of equipment and clothing used in the mine is also contained in this building.

==== Machinery displays ====
A simple corrugated iron shelter of recent construction is located just to the west of the workshops. This covers two Jenbach, diesel locomotives. An enclosure near the number three portal contains a mechanical loader and a mechanical coal cutter.

==== Ventilation shafts and explosives store ====
At the northernmost end of the site, there is a metal and concrete structure. This is the remains of the fan house that is located over a ventilation shaft into the number three mine. A similar structure is extant at the easternmost extent of the site. This marks the location of the ventilation shaft for the number two mine. A small explosives hut is located at the northeastern extremity of the site.

== Heritage listing ==
Acland No. 2 Colliery (former) was listed on the Queensland Heritage Register on 29 June 2007 having satisfied the following criteria.

The place is important in demonstrating the evolution or pattern of Queensland's history.

The Former Acland No 2 Colliery (1929–1984) is important in demonstrating the evolution of Queensland's coal mining industry. The former Acland colliery, a small underground mine originally opened to supply Queensland Government Railways is typical, in scale and type, of coalmines that were common prior to the late 1950s. Small underground mines like the Acland Colliery became less common during the 1960s due to changes in the scale and technology of mining.

The mine is also important in demonstrating the development of mining technology insofar that it illustrates a transitional phase between hand mining methods and full mechanisation. The practise of sorting and sizing of coal by hand, commonly at the coalface, ceased with the introduction of aboveground screening plants and picking belts. These were used at Acland No 2 Colliery where the picking belt and part of the screen assembly remain intact. Picking belts, in turn, were rendered obsolete by mechanical washing plants such as jigs.

The mine also retains physical evidence of former work practises that were common in coal mining. Miners were employed under contract and paid on the basis of the weight of coal they excavated. The weighbridge and tally desk used for this purpose are intact at the Acland mine.

The place demonstrates rare, uncommon or endangered aspects of Queensland's cultural heritage.

The Acland No 2 Colliery is rare in Queensland for its high degree of intactness as an early small underground coalmine. It is the most intact mine site of its age and type in Queensland.

It is also a rare example of a mine demonstrating a transitional phase between hand and fully mechanised mining. The mine has an intact picking belt used to separate rock from coal and to crush oversized pieces of coal by hand before the advent of mechanical washing plants.

The place is important in demonstrating the principal characteristics of a particular class of cultural places.

The mine is important in demonstrating the principal characteristics of small underground coalmines of the early to mid-20th Century. Due to its high degree of intactness, the mine illustrates almost the complete mining process as it was carried out at the mine. Intact structures and machinery include the coal haulage system including the tramway and cable system; the pithead structure and virtually all of the coal processing and handling machinery; and most of the ancillary buildings. Mining machines that were used underground in the mine remain extant on the site including a coal loader, two Jenbach diesel locomotives and metal coal skips, all dating to the 1950s. Extensive documentary records and plans associated with the mine remain extant including pay books dating to the opening of the mine in 1929.
