= Mount Darry, Queensland =

Mount Darry
- Suburb
- Interactive map of Mount Darry
- Coordinates: 27.1941°S 151.7713°E
- Country: Australia
- State: Queensland
- LGA: Toowoomba Region
- Location: 10.9 km (6.8 mi) W of Haden; 19.8 km (12.3 mi) E of Quinalow; 35 km (22 mi) NNE of Oakey; 53 km (33 mi) N of Toowoomba; 189 km (117 mi) WNW of Brisbane

Government
  - State electorate: Condamine
  - Federal division: Groom

Area
  - Total: 40.3 km^{2} (15.6 sq mi)

Population
  - Total: 46 (2021 census)
  - Density: 1.141/km^{2} (2.96/sq mi)
- Time zone: UTC+10:00 (AEST)
- Postcode: 4352
Suburbs around Mount Darry
Evergreen	Doctor Creek	Doctor Creek
Kulpi	Mount Darry	Doctor Creek
Rosalie Plains	Highland Plains	Kilbirnie

Mount Darry is a rural locality in the Toowoomba Region, Queensland, Australia. In the 2021 census, Mount Darry had a population of 46 people.

== Geography ==
Brigalow Park is a neighbourhood slightly east of the centre of the locality (27.2°S 151.7833°E).

The land use is a mix of crop growing and grazing on native vegetation.

== History ==
Mount Darry Provisional School opened on 28 August 1899. On 1 January 1909 it became Mount Darry State School. In 1915 it was renamed Zahley State School and in 1925 it was renamed Kilbirnie State School. It closed on 31 December 1961. It was located at 752 Goombungee Kilburnie Road (27.2229°S 151.8293°E).

Brigalow Park Provisional School opened on 17 October 1910. On 1 May 1912 it became Brigalow Park State School. It closed on 13 April 1962. It was located on Brigalow Park School Road (27.1996°S 151.7793°E).

== Demographics ==
In the 2016 census, Mount Darry had a population of 35 people.

In the 2021 census, Mount Darry had a population of 46 people.

== Economy ==
There are a number of homesteads in the locality:

- Avalon (27.1918°S 151.7367°E)
- Bottle Tree (27.1676°S 151.7670°E)
- Glenmore (27.2275°S 151.7864°E)
- Hilton (27.1979°S 151.7356°E)
- Mt Darry (27.1950°S 151.7851°E)
- Ridge Farm (27.1827°S 151.7801°E)
- Woodspring (27.2007°S 151.7535°E)

== Education ==
There are no schools in Mount Darry. The nearest government primary schools are Kulpi State School in neighbouring Kulpi to the west and Haden State School in Haden to the east. For secondary education to Year 10 only, the nearest government school is Quinalow State School in Quinalow to the north-west. For secondary education to Year 12, the nearest government school is Oakey State High School in Oakey to the south.
