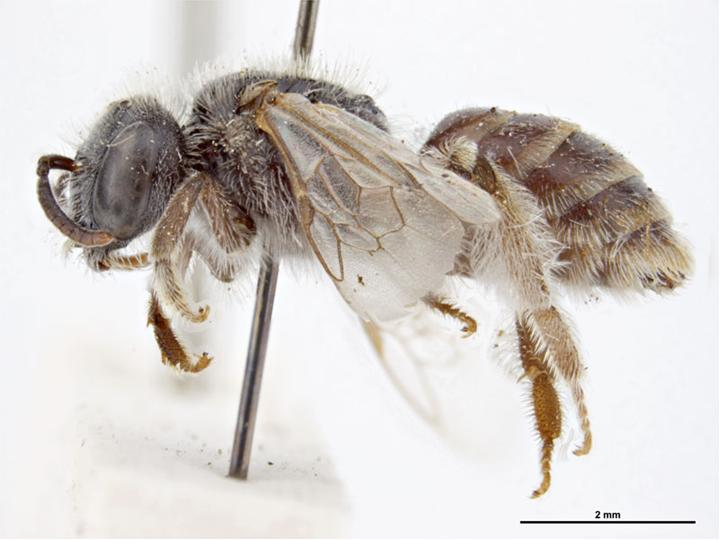
- Female

Scientific classification
- Kingdom: Animalia
- Phylum: Arthropoda
- Clade: Pancrustacea
- Class: Insecta
- Order: Hymenoptera
- Family: Colletidae
- Genus: Leioproctus
- Species: L. wahlenbergiae

Binomial name
- Leioproctus wahlenbergiae Michener, 1965: Leioproctus (Microcolletes) wahlenbergiae Michener, 1965

= Leioproctus wahlenbergiae =

Species of bee

Leioproctus wahlenbergiae, or Leioproctus (Minycolletes) wahlenbergiae, is a species of bee in the family Colletidae and subfamily Colletinae. It is endemic to Australia. It was described by American entomologist Charles Duncan Michener in 1965.

== Etymology ==
The specific epithet wahlenbergiae refers to a favoured forage plant.

== Description ==
The female holotype body length is 8 mm, wing length 5 mm; male allotype body length 8 mm, wing length 5 mm. Integumental colouration is mainly black, with some brown; the hair is dull white to pale yellowish-brown.

== Distribution and habitat ==
The species occurs in eastern Australia. The type locality is 27 km south of Dalby, in the Western Downs Region of southern Queensland. It has also been recorded from Clifton and Jondaryan in the Toowoomba Region.

== Behaviour ==
The adults are flying mellivores. Flowering plants visited by the bees include Wahlenbergia species.

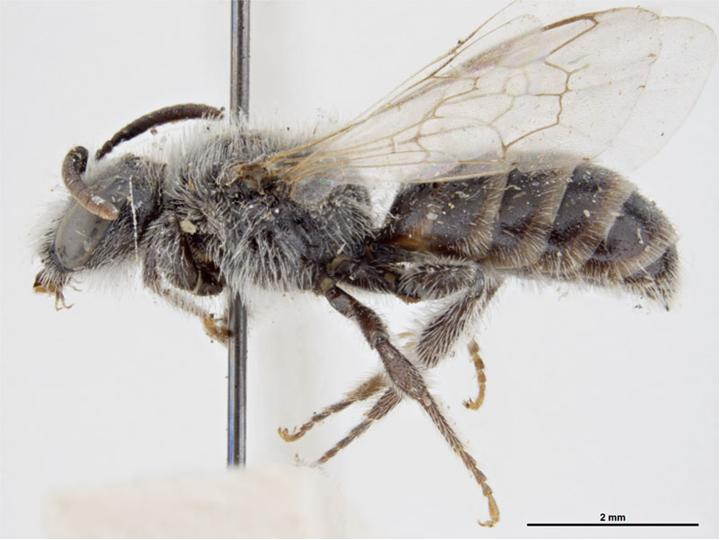
Male
