= Rosalie Plains, Queensland =

Rosalie Plains
- Suburb
- Interactive map of Rosalie Plains
- Coordinates: 27.2227°S 151.715°E
- Country: Australia
- State: Queensland
- LGA: Toowoomba Region
- Location: 28.8 km (17.9 mi) N of Oakey; 56.9 km (35.4 mi) NW of Toowoomba CBD; 185 km (115 mi) WNW of Brisbane

Government
  - State electorate: Condamine
  - Federal division: Groom

Area
  - Total: 38.8 km^{2} (15.0 sq mi)

Population
  - Total: 54 (2021 census)
  - Density: 1.392/km^{2} (3.60/sq mi)
- Time zone: UTC+10:00 (AEST)
- Postcode: 4401
Suburbs around Rosalie Plains
Kulpi	Kulpi	Mount Darry
Brymaroo	Rosalie Plains	Highland Plains
Brymaroo	Balgowan	Highland Plains

Rosalie Plains is a rural locality in the Toowoomba Region, Queensland, Australia. In the 2021 census, Rosalie Plains had a population of 54 people.

== Geography ==
The Pechey-Maclagan Road enters the locality from the south (Balgowan), travels north and then west through the locality, exiting to the west (Brymaroo). The Oakey–Cooyar Road enters the locality from the north (Kulpi), intersects with Pechey-Maclagan Road and continues south on the same route as the Pechey-Maclagan Road to Balgowan.

The land use is a mix of crop growing and grazing on native vegetation.

== History ==
The locality takes its name from an early pastoral run that was held by Robert Ramsay in the late 1840s.

In 1877, 11,500 acres (4,700 ha) were resumed from the Rosalie Plains pastoral run and offered for selection on 17 April 1877.

Ashlea Provisional School opened in January 1907. On 1 January 1909, it became Ashlea State School, being renamed Rosalie Plains State School in 1916. It closed circa 1944. It was on the eastern side of Old Rosalie School Road (27.20427°S 151.66179°E). Despite the name, the school was in the present-day locality of neighbouring Brymaroo.

== Demographics ==
In the 2016 census, Rosalie Plains had a population of 44 people.

In the 2021 census, Rosalie Plains had a population of 54 people.

== Education ==
There are no schools in Rosalie Plains. The nearest government primary school is Kulpi State School in neighbouring Kulpi to the north. The nearest government secondary schools are Quinalow State School (to Year 10) in Quinalow to the north-west and Oakey State High School (to Year 12) in Oakey.
