= Hylaeus multigibbosus =

Scientific classification
- Kingdom: Animalia
- Phylum: Arthropoda
- Clade: Pancrustacea
- Class: Insecta
- Order: Hymenoptera
- Family: Colletidae
- Genus: Hylaeus
- Species: H. multigibbosus

Binomial name
- Hylaeus multigibbosus Michener, 1965

Species of bee

Hylaeus multigibbosus, or Hylaeus (Pseudhylaeus) multigibbosus, is a species of bee in the family Colletidae and subfamily Hylaeinae. It is endemic to Australia. It was described by American entomologist Charles Duncan Michener in 1965.

== Etymology ==
The specific epithet multigibbosus is an anatomical reference to the many shining convexities, or gibbosities, on the underside of the male metasoma.

== Description ==
Male body length is 6.5–7 mm, wing length 5 mm; female body length 5.5–6.5 mm, wing length 4.6 mm. Integumental colouration is mainly black, with cream markings.

== Distribution and habitat ==
The species occurs in eastern mainland Australia. The type locality is Canberra in the Australian Capital Territory. It has also been recorded from Jondaryan, Queensland.

== Behaviour ==
The adults are flying mellivores. Flowering plants visited by the bees include Wahlenbergia species.
