= Kilbirnie, Queensland =

Kilbirnie
- Suburb
- Interactive map of Kilbirnie
- Coordinates: 27.2322°S 151.8238°E
- Country: Australia
- State: Queensland
- LGA: Toowoomba Region
- Location: 33.5 km (20.8 mi) NNW of Highfields; 36.4 km (22.6 mi) NNE of Oakey; 46.0 km (28.6 mi) NNW of Toowoomba CBD; 174 km (108 mi) WNW of Brisbane

Government
  - State electorate: Condamine
  - Federal division: Groom

Area
  - Total: 31.9 km^{2} (12.3 sq mi)

Population
  - Total: 68 (2021 census)
  - Density: 2.132/km^{2} (5.52/sq mi)
- Time zone: UTC+10:00 (AEST)
- Postcode: 4354
Suburbs around Kilbirnie
Mount Darry	Doctor Creek	Haden
Highland Plains	Kilbirnie	Haden
Highland Plains	Goombungee	Goombungee

Kilbirnie, formerly known as Fahley, is a rural locality in the Toowoomba Region, Queensland, Australia. In the 2021 census, Kilbirnie had a population of 68 people.

== History ==
Mount Darry Provisional School opened on 28 August 1899. On 1 January 1909, it became Mount Darry State School. In 1915, it was renamed Zahley State School. In 1925, it was renamed Kilbirnie State School. It closed on 31 December 1961. It was located at 752 Goombungee Kilburnie Road (27.2229°S 151.8293°E).

== Demographics ==
In the 2016 census, Kilbirnie had a population of 60 people.

In the 2021 census, Kilbirnie had a population of 68 people.

== Education ==
There are no schools in Kilbirnie. The nearest government primary schools are Haden State School in neighbouring Haden to the east and Goombungee State School in neighbouring Goombungee to the south. The nearest government secondary schools are:

- Crow's Nest State School (to Year 10) in Crows Nest to the east
- Highfields State Secondary College (to Year 12) in Highfields to the south-east
- Oakey State High School (to Year 12) in Oakey to the south-west
- Quinalow State School (to Year 10) in Quinalow to the north-west
