= Evergreen, Queensland =

Evergreen
- Town
- Interactive map of Evergreen
- Coordinates: 27.1575°S 151.7274°E
- Country: Australia
- State: Queensland
- LGA: Toowoomba Region
- Location: 36.3 km (22.6 mi) N of Oakey; 63.8 km (39.6 mi) NNW of Toowoomba; 192 km (119 mi) WNW of Brisbane

Government
  - State electorate: Condamine
  - Federal division: Groom

Area
  - Total: 31.2 km^{2} (12.0 sq mi)

Population
  - Total: 49 (2021 census)
  - Density: 1.571/km^{2} (4.07/sq mi)
- Time zone: UTC+10:00 (AEST)
- Postcode: 4352
Localities around Evergreen
Narko	Narko	Highgrove
Peranga	Evergreen	Doctor Creek
Kulpi	Kulpi	Mount Darry

Evergreen is a rural town and locality in the Toowoomba Region, Queensland, Australia. In the 2021 census, the locality of Evergreen had a population of 49 people.

== Geography ==
The Oakey–Cooyar Road runs through from south-west to north-east.

== History ==
Evergreen Provisional School opened on 17 June 1895. On 1 January 1909 it became Evergreen State School. It closed on 13 December 1996. Opened as a provisional school in 1895 and was proclaimed a state school on 1 Jan 1909. It closed in 1996. It was at 3616 Oakey Cooyar Road (27.1531°S 151.73813°E).

King's Hill Provisional School opened in 1917. On 1 July 1918, it became King's Hill State School. It closed circa 1926.

Berndale Provisional School opened on 13 November 1922. On 1 August 1924, it became Berndale State School. It closed in 1956.

== Demographics ==
In the 2016 census, the locality of Evergreen had a population of 45 people.

In the 2021 census, the locality of Evergreen had a population of 49 people.

== Education ==
There are no schools in Evergreen. The nearest government primary school is Kulpi State School in neighbouring Kulpi to the south. The nearest government secondary school is Quinalow State School in neighbouring Quinalow to the west which provides secondary education to Year 10. For secondary education to Year 12, the nearest government school is Oakey State High School in Oakey to the south.
