= Maclagan, Queensland =

Maclagan
- Town
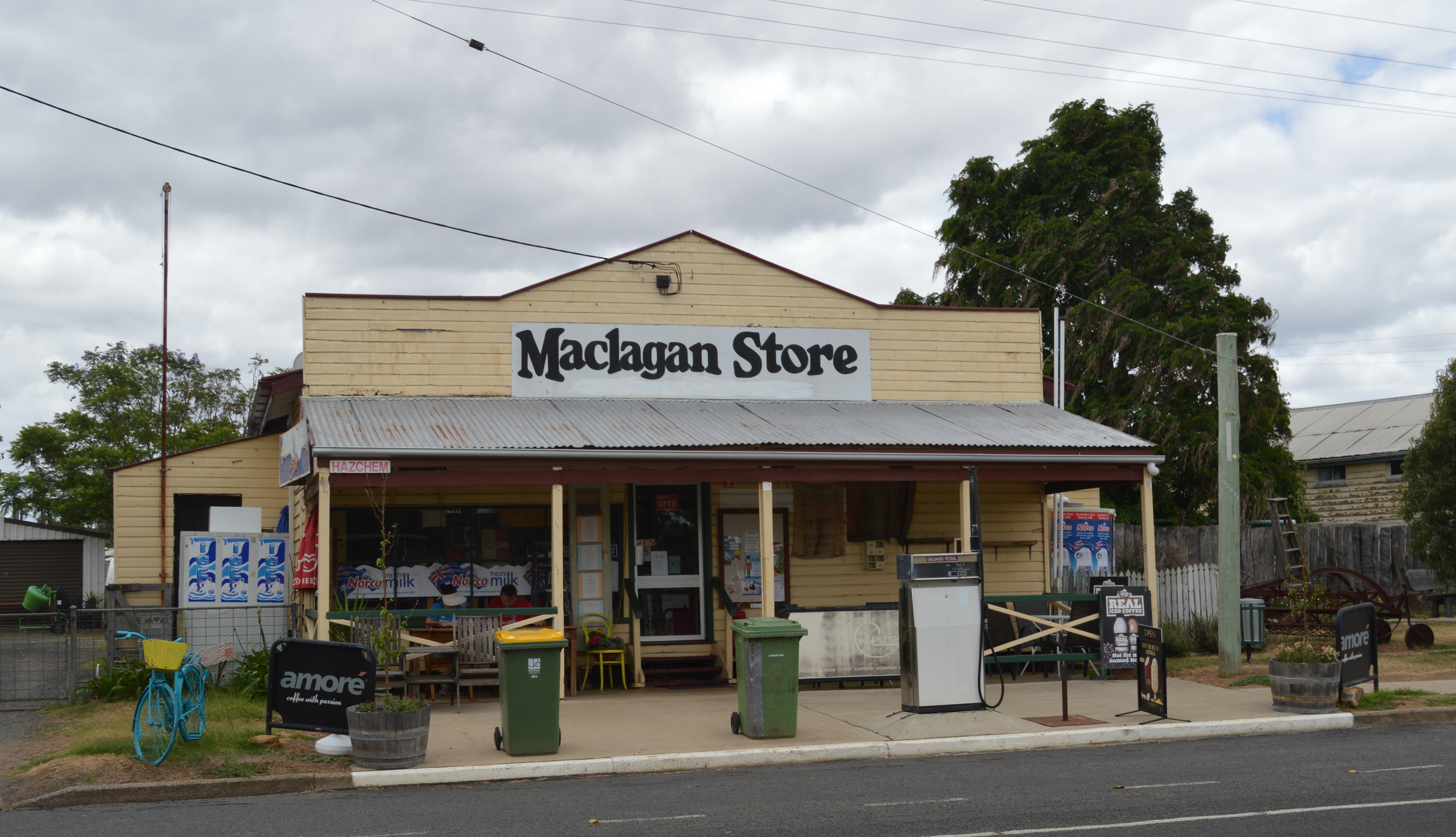
- General store, 2017

- Interactive map of Maclagan
- Coordinates: 27.0838°S 151.635°E
- Country: Australia
- State: Queensland
- LGA: Toowoomba Region
- Location: 50.5 km (31.4 mi) ENE of Dalby; 54.4 km (33.8 mi) N of Oakey; 80.5 km (50.0 mi) NNW of Toowoomba; 208 km (129 mi) WNW of Brisbane
- Established: circa 1890

Government
  - State electorate: Nanango
  - Federal division: Groom

Area
  - Total: 76.4 km^{2} (29.5 sq mi)

Population
  - Total: 130 (2021 census)
  - Density: 1.70/km^{2} (4.41/sq mi)
- Time zone: UTC+10:00 (AEST)
- Postcode: 4352
Localities around Maclagan
| Moola | Rangemore; North Maclagan | Upper Cooyar Creek |
| Malling | Maclagan | Nutgrove |
| Quinalow | Peranga | Woodleigh; Narko |

Maclagan, formerly known as Bismarck (German: [ˈbɪsmaʁk] BISS-mark), is a rural town and locality in the Toowoomba Region, Queensland, Australia. In the 2021 census, the locality of Maclagan had a population of 130 people.

== Geography ==
Maclagan is a small town on the Darling Downs, 80 km (49.7 mi) north-west of Toowoomba and 45 km (28 mi) east of Dalby.

The Dalby–Cooyar Road runs through from south to east. Bunya Mountains-Maclagan Road exits to the north. The Pechey-Maclagan Road ends at the southern boundary where it meets Dalby-Cooyar Road.

== History ==
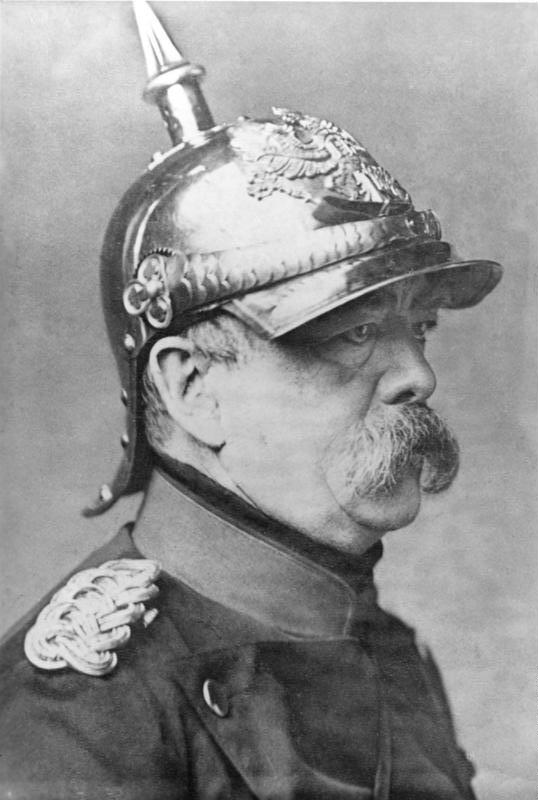
Otto von Bismarck

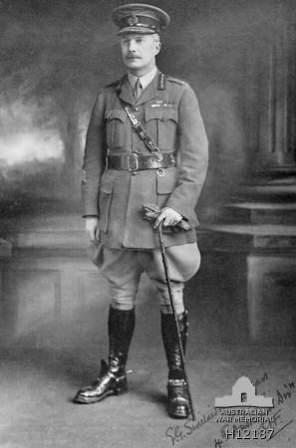
Ewen George Sinclair-Maclagan

The township of Maclagan was surveyed on 17 May 1889. The town was originally named Bismarck after Otto von Bismarck until 1916 when it was renamed Maclagan due to the anti-German sentiment during World War I. The township was renamed Maclagan in honour of Brigadier Ewen George Sinclair-Maclagan (1868–1948). Bismarck Street is still a street in the town.

Moola Road Provisional School opened on 5 September 1904. On 1 January 1909, it became Moola Road State School. In 1916 it was renamed Maclagan State School. It closed on 22 June 1962.

On Saturday 3 October 1925, the Maclagan School of Arts was officially opened with a ball.

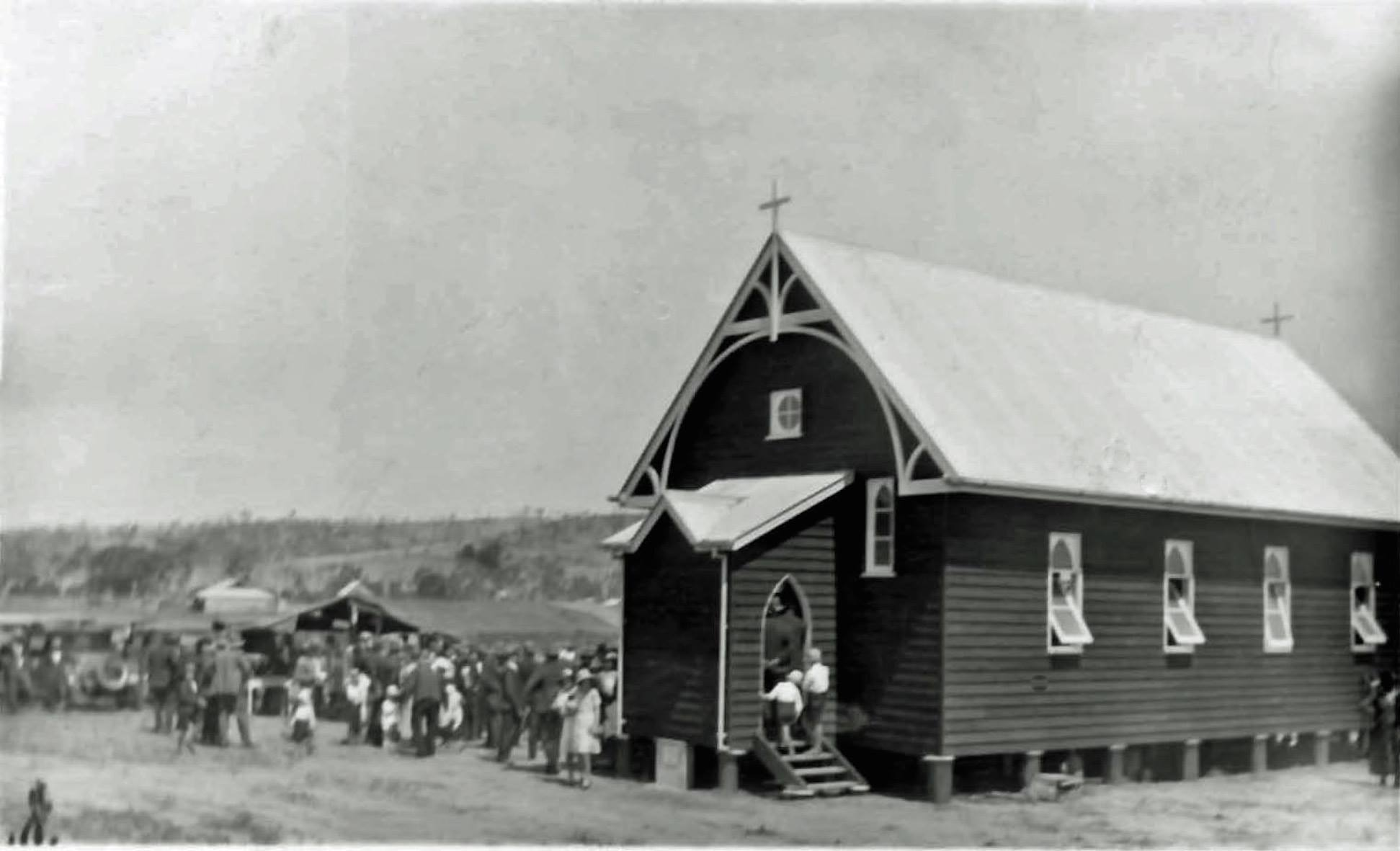
Lutheran church, 1936

St Matthew's Lutheran Church was officially opened and dedicated on 3 November 1935. It was on the Bunya Mountains Road to the west of the town. In 1961 it was relocated to Margaret Street.

On Saturday 24 October 1942, Macalagan Memorial Hall was officially opened and dedicated to those who served in World War I and World War II.

Rimfire Winery was established in 1992 by Tony Connellan at 44 Bismarck Street (27.0882°S 151.6425°E). It closed some time between 2006 and 2012.

== Demographics ==
In the 2011 census, the locality of Maclagan and the surrounding area had a population of 342 people.

In the 2016 census, the locality of Maclagan had a population of 195 people.

In the 2021 census, the locality of Maclagan had a population of 130 people.

== Economy ==
Maclagan Meats Processing is at 4282 Dalby Cooyar Road (27.0881°S 151.6331°E).

== Education ==
There are no schools in Maclagan. The nearest government primary school and secondary school to Year 10 is Quinalow State School in neighbouring Quinalow to the south-west. For secondary education to Year 12 the nearest government schools are Oakey State High School in Oakey to the south and Dalby State High School in Dalby to the south-west.

== Amenities ==
Maclagan has a post office and general store, a small museum, a butcher, a kindergarten and a park. It also has a welding shop, and fuel depot.

Maclagan Memorial Hall is at 23-25 Margaret Street (27.0849°S 151.6341°E).

St Matthew's Lutheran Church is at 7 Margaret Street (27.0829°S 151.6354°E).

Maclagan Cemetery is on Quinalow Woodleigh Road (27.0956°S 151.6379°E).

== Attractions ==
Maclagan Memories Museum is an open-air museum at 25 Bunya Mountains Maclagan Road (27.0834°S 151.6333°E). It includes the original Jondaryan Court House (established 1884), Rangemore State School (opened 1913), and the Quinalow Milk Express truck.
