= Devon Park, Queensland =

Devon Park
- Suburb
- Interactive map of Devon Park
- Coordinates: 27.3561°S 151.6761°E
- Country: Australia
- State: Queensland
- LGA: Toowoomba Region
- Location: 11.5 km (7.1 mi) NW of Oakey; 38.1 km (23.7 mi) NW of Toowoomba CBD; 168 km (104 mi) W of Brisbane

Government
  - State electorate: Condamine
  - Federal division: Groom

Area
  - Total: 44.0 km^{2} (17.0 sq mi)

Population
  - Total: 55 (2021 census)
  - Density: 1.250/km^{2} (3.24/sq mi)
- Time zone: UTC+10:00 (AEST)
- Postcode: 4401
Suburbs around Devon Park
Jondaryan	Acland	Sabine
Jondaryan	Devon Park	Kelvinhaugh
Jondaryan	Oakey	Oakey

Devon Park is a rural locality in the Toowoomba Region, Queensland, Australia. In the 2021 census, Devon Park had a population of 55 people.

== History ==
The locality is named after an early pastoral station in the district.

Devon Park Provisional School opened on 2 September 1903. On 1 January 1909, it became Devon Park State School. It closed in 1963. It was on the southern side of Devon Park Road (27.37817°S 151.66996°E).

== Demographics ==
In the 2016 census, Devon Park had a population of 49 people.

In the 2021 census, Devon Park had a population of 55 people.

== Education ==
There are no schools in Devon Park. The nearest government primary schools are Oakey State School in neighbouring Oakey to the south-east and Jondaryan State School in neighbouring Jondaryan to the west. The nearest government secondary school is Oakey State High School, also in Oakey.
