= Lamp room =

Mining facility to maintain lamps

Lamp Room
- Building: Big Pit National Coal Museum
- Location: Blaenavon
- Country: Wales, UK
- Purpose: Storage, maintenance, and issuance of miners' safety lamps
- Operator: Lamp room keeper

A lamp room is a designated facility, historically associated with coal mines, where miners' safety lamps were stored, maintained, inspected, and issued. It served as a critical hub for mine safety and administrative control throughout the 19th and much of the 20th century. The lamp room keeper was a responsible official who played a key role in tracking personnel underground.

== History and function ==
The lamp room became an essential part of mine infrastructure following the widespread introduction of the Davy lamp and other safety lamps in the early 19th century. Before the advent of electric lighting and modern methane detection, these lamps were the primary source of light and a vital indicator of atmospheric conditions, for example, the presence of firedamp.

Its primary functions were:

- Storage & Charging: Safely storing hundreds of lamps. For oil lamps, this included refilling fuel. For later electric cap lamps, it involved charging batteries on large racks.
- Maintenance & Repair: Ensuring wicks, glasses, meshes, and later, electrical components were in perfect working order to prevent ignition of gases.
- Issuance and Collection: Each miner would be issued their unique numbered lamp at the start of a shift and return it at the end. This process, recorded by the lamp room keeper, provided a reliable check-in/check-out system to know exactly who was underground.
- Safety Control: Lamps were only issued to authorized personnel. The lamp room often served as a choke point where men could be checked for contraband (e.g., matches, cigarettes) that could cause an explosion.

=== Decline and heritage ===
The role of the traditional lamp room diminished in the late 20th century with the decline of coal mining, the shift to maintenance-free modern lamp units, and improved electronic tracking systems. However, the architectural and social significance of lamp rooms remains.

Many preserved mining museums, such as the Big Pit National Coal Museum in Wales and the Caphouse Colliery (National Coal Mining Museum for England) in Yorkshire, feature restored lamp rooms as central exhibits, demonstrating this critical aspect of mining life and safety.

== Layout and typical features ==
A lamp room was usually located at the surface, near the pit head and the mine office. Its design prioritized safety and workflow:

- Separate Rooms: Often had separate, well-ventilated areas for filling oils (the "oil house") to isolate fire risk.
- Strong Racks: Sturdy wooden or metal racks with numbered spaces for each lamp. · Counting Board/Tokens: A board with numbered tags or tokens corresponding to each lamp. A miner would take their token to the window to exchange for their lamp, providing a clear visual record of who was still underground.
- Repair Benches: Equipped with tools for lamp maintenance.
- Charge Racks: In later years, banks of charging stations for electric cap lamp batteries.

=== The lamp room keeper ===
The lamp room keeper was a trusted official, often a senior miner. Duties included maintaining the lamps, keeping meticulous records of issuance, and ensuring no unsafe items were taken underground. The keeper's record was the definitive list for rescue operations in the event of an accident.
