= Jondaryan Woolshed =

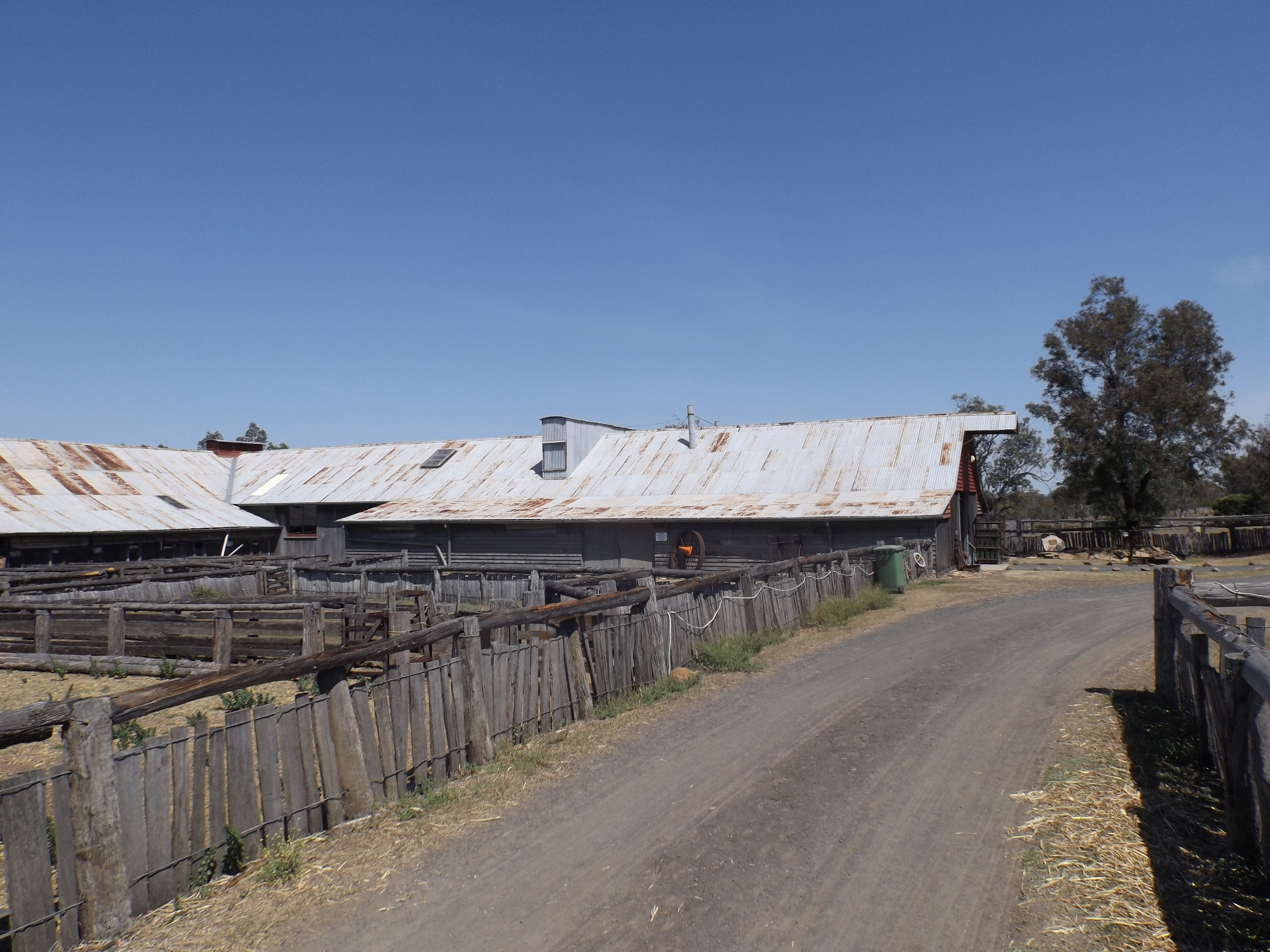
- Woolshed building, 2014

- Location within Queensland Location within Australia
- 27.3941°S 151.5716°E
- Location: Evanslea Road, Jondaryan, Queensland, Australia

History
- Design period: 1840s - 1860s (mid-19th century)
- Built: 1859 - 1861

Queensland Heritage Register
- Official name: Jondaryan Woolshed, Jondaryan Station
- Type: state heritage (built)
- Designated: 21 October 1992
- Reference no.: 600633
- Significant period: 1850s-1880s (historical); 1850s-1860s (fabric)
- Significant components: shearing shed/woolshed, residential accommodation - shearers' quarters, yards - livestock

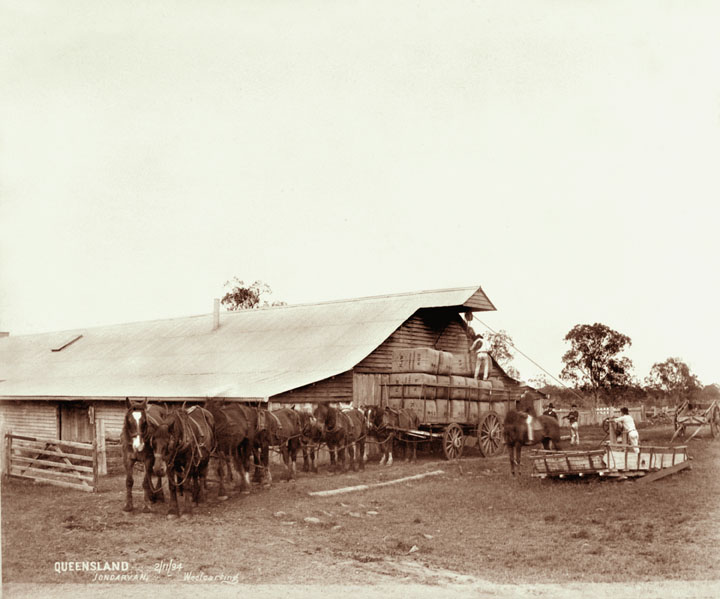
Jondaryan Woolshed, 1894

Jondaryan Woolshed is a heritage-listed shearing shed at Evanslea Road, Jondaryan, Queensland, Australia. It was built in 1859–60 to replace an earlier, smaller woolshed on the former Jondaryan pastoral station, which was at one stage the largest freehold station in Queensland. The woolshed was the scene of significant labour conflict in the late 1880s and early 1890s, as the station became a test case for the new Queensland Shearers Union in the lead-up to the 1891 Australian shearers' strike.

In 1946, Jondaryan Estates, the pastoral company which owned Jondaryan Station, was liquidated. The station's remaining lands, apart from 2,000 acres (810 ha) adjoining the homestead, were subdivided and sold, and the woolshed passed into separate ownership. In 1972, the then owner of the property offered the woolshed and 12 acres (4.9 ha) of land to the people of Jondaryan. The Jondaryan Woolshed Historical Museum and Park Association was formed in 1976, and the site was subsequently developed into a tourist attraction. It was added to the Queensland Heritage Register on 21 October 1992.

The Jondaryan Homestead site also largely survives, although the original house was destroyed by fire in 1937. It is separately listed on the Queensland Heritage Register.

== History ==
The Darling Downs was visited in 1827 by botanist and explorer Allan Cunningham. A demand for land was growing as free settlement increased and Cunningham reported favourably on the potential of the area for grazing. European settlement was delayed for some years, however, because the presence of the penal colony at Moreton Bay restricted access to the area. In the 1830s pastoral settlement in New South Wales pushed northwards as graziers looked for new land and in 1840 the first sheep run was established on the Downs, to be rapidly followed by others. Henry Dennis chose land between Oakey Creek west to Myall Creek as a pastoral run in 1840. Although he had come to the Downs looking for suitable land for others, he failed to register this run, which he had reputedly wanted for himself, and in 1842 Charles Coxen took it up. Coxen sent his nephew Henry to run the property and it was he who named the place "Jondaryan", thought to be a corruption of an Aboriginal name for a large lagoon. Henry Coxen established the first simple homestead in 1844, but built a new one later that year on the site of the present homestead, now separated from the woolshed by Evanslea Road, to avoid the lightning strikes experienced at the first location. He also constructed other buildings including a small shearing shed.

In 1845, the Coxens gave up the property and for some years southern investors owned it. The run originally consisted of 13,000 acres (5,300 ha) but land was added and by 1855 it comprised 128,000 acres (52,000 ha). Robert and Edwin Tooth, who were also founders of the Tooth and Co. brewery, the Colonial Sugar Refining Company and the Bank of New South Wales, purchased Jondaryan for £30,000 in 1856. The Tooths began to buy large sections of the run under their pre-emptive rights to purchase their leased land. In 1858 the partnership of Kent and Weinholt, which owned adjoining properties, sub-leased Jondaryan, managed by James C White.

It was an era when wool prices were high and the pastoral industry was buoyant. Kent and Weinholt began a program of extending and improving facilities on Jondaryan. Between 1859 and 1861, 7 men worked for a total of 40 weeks cutting slabs and shingles. Large quantities of timber was also pit sawn into planks. A considerable amount of building was undertaken including that of a small church to serve the station community, called St Anne's (c. 1859), shearers' quarters (1860), a new station store (1862), a butchers shop, a hide and tallow house and a stable and coach house (1862).

J. C. White, who had at one time worked as a clerk of works for the Colonial Architect's office in New South Wales Government, designed the new woolshed. T. Jones, a carpenter, carried out the construction, which was commenced in 1859. The roof was originally intended to be shingled, but in 1860 it was decided to use imported corrugated iron sheeting instead. The building was T-shaped, comprising a short central section for baling and loading the wool, with two long wings set at right angles to this. Sheep moved into the building from each end, processing through pens to a shearing board with 52 stands on the perimeter and thence to counting out pens. The first shearing was conducted in 1861 and after this alterations were made to improve the design by builders Charles Hines & Co. These included excavating under the woolshed, gutting and refitting the building, and levelling and paving the yards with cobblestones. In 1863, Kent and Wienholt purchased the property for £108,000. The partnership had interest in other pastoral properties and also acquired adjoining stations to Jondaryan using it as a head station responsible for the distribution of pay, equipment and rations. Stations at the time had small "village" communities for employees, there being a considerable number of people living on Jondaryan apart from the manager and his family. Accommodation for workers and their families and facilities such as a store, blacksmiths and other trades essential for running stations in an isolated area were built.

In 1867 the Western railway line passed through Jondaryan land and reached Dalby in 1868. A settlement developed around the railway station at Jondaryan, taking on the same name, and by the 1870s had about 100 inhabitants. A Divisional Board was formed in 1879 and the Shire of Jondaryan in 1903, the importance of Jondaryan station to the area being reflected by the participation of its managers as Chairmen.

Sheep from other stations were sent to be sheared at Jondaryan woolshed. In the 1873 season, 24,000 sheep shorn were from other properties. In 1891 machine shearing was brought in at Jondaryan and the number of stands reduced to 36.

Jondaryan continued to expand with the acquisition of land and reached a maximum size of 300,000 acres (120,000 ha). It was at one time the largest freehold station in Queensland with 155,000 acres (63,000 ha) of freehold land. It played a part in the struggle for improved wages and conditions in the pastoral industry that culminated in the 1891 Australian shearers' strike. The owners and managers of such large stations as Jondaryan had considerable power to dictate terms to an itinerant workforce recruited for the shearing season. In 1887 the Queensland Shearers Union was formed at Blackall. Within a year it had 1300 members, indicating a perceived need for collective bargaining to obtain fair pay and working conditions.

Jondaryan became an early test case because in 1888 its management used non-union labour and the union shearers refused to sign on for the following season. In 1889, the graziers banded together in response to union demands and moved to reduce pay rates. Jondaryan manager, Charles Williams, was a foundation member of the United Graziers Association. Many workers now joined the unions, pushing membership of the Shearers' Union over 3000 and the Labourer's Union to 2,250. At Jondaryan, no union members were employed for the 1889 season and in retaliation the shed was placed under union ban in 1890. The sheep were sheared by non-union labour but the clip was held up at each stage of its shipment, as members of other unions would not handle it. Bales of Jondaryan wool stood on the wharves until a compromise was negotiated. It was the first occasion on which unions had worked in federation, leading to the Barcaldine strike of 1891 and the subsequent formation of the Labor party.

In 1894 the Kent and Weinholt partnership was dissolved and a new company called Jondaryan Estates Company of Australia (Pty) Limited was formed, comprising Jondaryan and other properties. From the 1890s much of the leasehold land was resumed for agricultural use and wheat and lucerne was grown on Jondaryan for its own use. In 1906, the sale of the freehold portions was compelled by new land regulations, although by the early 1920s it was still one of the biggest of the Darling Downs properties and still shearing sheep for other stations.

In 1937 the homestead building burnt down and was rebuilt, but in the 1940s land sales continued to reduce the property. It was decided to voluntarily sell land directly, giving preference to former employees and men with previous farming experience, rather than allow the land to be disposed of through government ballot. From 1 January 1946, Jondaryan ceased to exist as a station and the company was wound up, though the homestead and 2,000 acres (810 ha) on the southern bank of the creek were retained. It was at this time that the block containing the woolshed was sold and it is thought that part of the western wing was removed to be used as farm machinery shed. One of original blocks of shearers' quarters remained to the rear of the woolshed.

In 1972, following the success of celebrations held at the Jondaryan woolshed to mark the centenary of the Jondaryan State School, the owner of the property offered the woolshed and 12 acres (4.9 ha) of land to the people of Jondaryan. As a result, the Jondaryan Woolshed Historical Museum and Park Association was formally established in October 1976 and since that time the place has been developed as a tourist attraction. Considerable renewal and reconstruction work has been carried out on the woolshed including the reconstruction of the western wing. From 1977 an annual Australian Heritage Festival has been held at the woolshed and the remaining shearers' quarters were adapted in 1978 to provide backpacker accommodation.

A considerable number of buildings from the surrounding district have been moved onto the site. Some were built on Jondaryan or its outstations, but have been relocated, such as an 1850s blacksmith's shop (relocated 1977); a shepherd's hut from Mt Moriah (relocated 1978); the 1880s Lagoon Creek homestead (relocated 1982) and a shepherds hut (relocated 1978);

There are also a number of buildings from other places such as the Woodleigh Cheese factory (relocated 1994); the Jondaryan Railway Station (relocated 1998), a shepherd's hut from Cecil Plains (relocated 1994); a police lockup from Peranga (relocated 1980); the Evanslea bagged grain shed (relocated 1979); the Oakey Bank of New South Wales (relocated 1986) and a railway building from Bongeen, now used as a 'barber's shop'.

An array of buildings has also been constructed including a dairy, sulky shed, hayshed, sawmill, barn, and shepherd's hut, together with various display pavilions, machinery sheds and yards. In addition a number of sheds have been erected for storage purposes. There is a large collection of farm machinery and tractors on the site. The new and relocated buildings are not included in the Queensland Heritage Register entry.

== Description ==
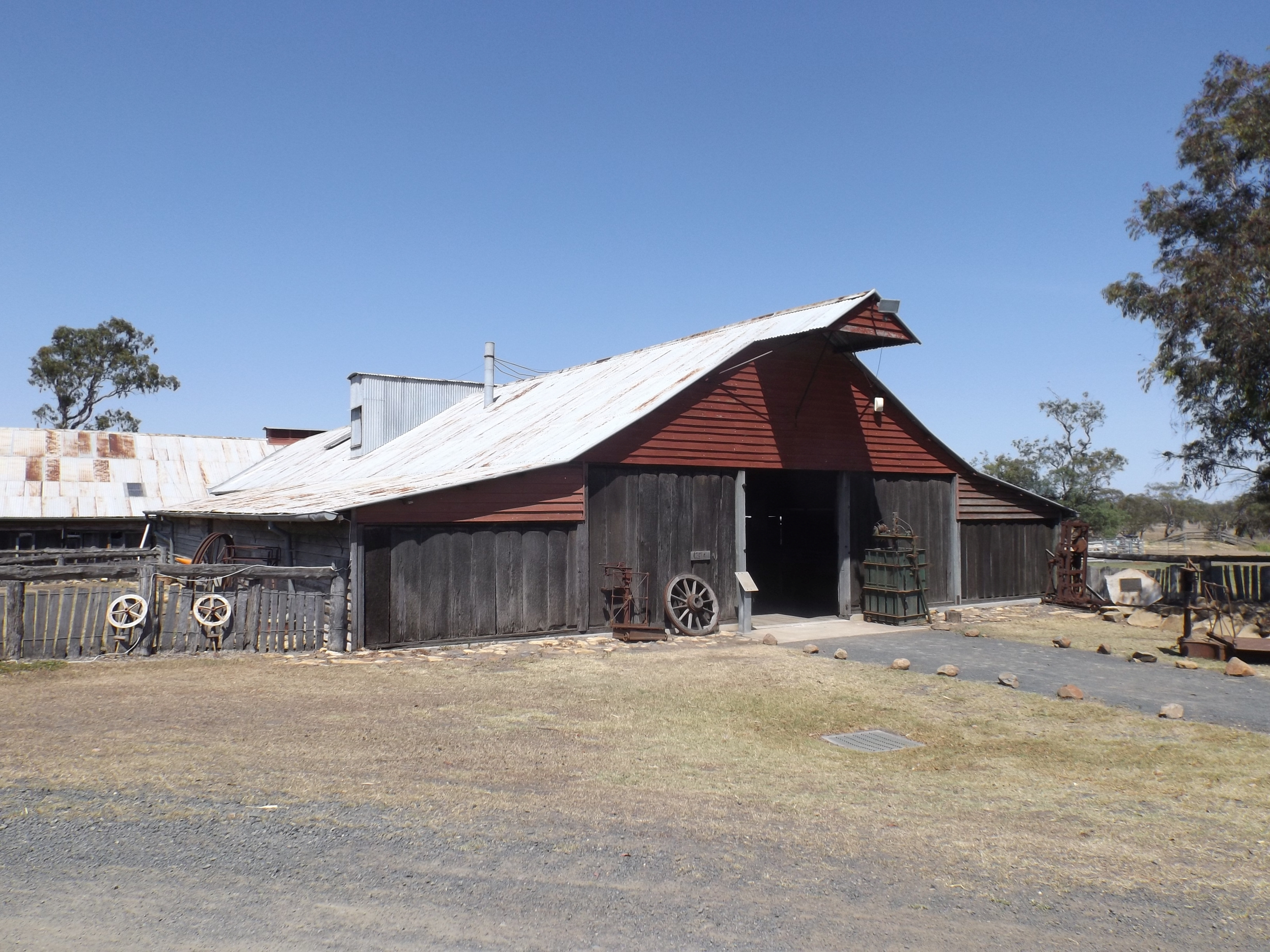
Jondaryn Woolshed entrance, 2014

The Jondaryan Woolshed is located about 3 kilometres (1.9 mi) south of the town of Jondaryan on a flat area close to Oakey Creek. It is now a focal point within the Jondaryan Woolshed Historical Museum and Park. In addition to the woolshed and associated shearers' quarters (now separated from the remains of the original Jondaryan Homestead by Evanslea Road), the complex is home to a number of relocated buildings from the district.

The woolshed is a large T-shaped building consisting of a main section running approximately east west, with a short stem of the T facing north. It is constructed of timber with a gabled roof clad in corrugated iron and is set within a system of timber yards.

The main section of the building houses the pens, board and wool classing areas. It has a central space with side aisles and timber trusses support the roof. The walls are clad with timber slabs, both original and recent replacements for the vertical corrugated iron sheeting which clad the walls of the west wing. The floors are timber with spaced boards in the pens to allow sheep droppings to fall through. The wool classing area has a rolling table for the fleeces, and has been extended over time.

The central section to the north has a small projecting gable formed by an extension of the roof which houses the pulleys of the wool-bale loading hoist. This area was a wool storage area that led from the classing bins and the wool presses in the same wing.

The shearers' quarters is a rectangular timber framed building to the rear of the woolshed. It has a gabled roof clad in corrugated iron and walls clad in vertical corrugated iron sheeting. It has a verandah running the length of one side supported on timber posts. Doors open onto this. At the rear are top hinged corrugated iron shutters. It is used for accommodation.

== Heritage listing ==
Jondaryan Woolshed was listed on the Queensland Heritage Register on 21 October 1992 having satisfied the following criteria.

The place is important in demonstrating the evolution or pattern of Queensland's history.

Jondaryan station, established in the early 1840s, was one of the earliest and largest pastoral enterprises on the Darling Downs. It preceded the settlement of towns and acted as a catalyst for closer settlement by providing employment and facilities for a large number of employees and their families in the area. The woolshed, which was erected in 1859–60 as part of a programme of expansion on Jondaryan, reflects the growth and prosperity of the wool industry in the decade between the mid 1850s and 60s. In its materials, construction methods and the way in which it has been designed to facilitate rapid processing of sheep to be shorn, it illustrates a number of aspects of the Australian wool industry in the nineteenth century. Changes, such as the extension of the wool table to accommodate fleeces from larger breeds of sheep, are also important in demonstrating changes within the industry. Jondaryan played a part in the early stages of the conflict between owners and labour in the pastoral industry that culminated in the Barcaldine Shearers' Strike of 1891 and the formation of the Labor party.

The place demonstrates rare, uncommon or endangered aspects of Queensland's cultural heritage.

The Jondaryan Woolshed is rare as a large and early woolshed in Queensland and is believed to be one of the earliest surviving woolsheds in this state.

The place has potential to yield information that will contribute to an understanding of Queensland's history.

The area surrounding the Jondaryan woolshed is important for its potential, as an archaeological site, to reveal information about the way in which the shed was used and therefore on the early operation of the pastoral industry in Queensland.

The place is important in demonstrating the principal characteristics of a particular class of cultural places.

The Jondaryan woolshed retains much of its form and fabric and provides good examples of the design, construction methods and materials used for this type of building in the mid 19th century.

The place is important because of its aesthetic significance.

Its large scale and position on a flat plain make it a striking building in the landscape. Its form and materials as a vernacular building of a type characteristic of the Australian countryside have aesthetic qualities demonstrably well liked by the community.

The place has a strong or special association with a particular community or cultural group for social, cultural or spiritual reasons.

Its importance to the people of the local area is shown by community efforts to preserve it as the centrepiece of a complex presenting the history of the area.
