= Brymaroo =

- Suburb
- Interactive map of Brymaroo
- Coordinates: 27.2188°S 151.6252°E
- Country: Australia
- State: Queensland
- LGA: Toowoomba Region
- Location: 34.9 km (21.7 mi) NNW of Oakey; 45.5 km (28.3 mi) E of Dalby; 61.0 km (37.9 mi) NW of Toowoomba; 189 km (117 mi) W of Brisbane

Government
  - State electorate: Condamine
  - Federal division: Groom

Area
  - Total: 114.9 km^{2} (44.4 sq mi)

Population
  - Total: 128 (2021 census)
  - Density: 1.114/km^{2} (2.885/sq mi)
- Time zone: UTC+10:00 (AEST)
- Postcode: 4403
Suburbs around Brymaroo
Quinalow	Quinalow	Kulpi
Irvingdale	Brymaroo	Rosalie Plains; Balgowan
Bowenville	Malu; Jondaryan	Muldu

Brymaroo is a rural locality in the Toowoomba Region, Queensland, Australia. It includes the location of the World War II era Brymaroo Aerodrome and current Army Aviation practice area. In the 2021 census, Brymaroo had a population of 128 people.

== Geography ==
The Pechey-Maclagan Road runs through from east to north. The Jondaryan-Nungil Road runs south from the centre, and the Brymaroo-Irvingdale Road runs west.

== History ==
The locality was originally called Rosalie (possibly after the parish name) but was renamed Byrmaroo on 1 July 1905 to avoid confusion with other places called Rosalie.

The first Rosalie Plains Provisional School opened in 1881 as a half-time school with Irvingdale Provisional School (meaning they shared a single teacher) but closed on 6 May 1881. On 1 May 1882 it re-opened as a full-time provisional school but closed on 2 May 1883. It opened again in April 1889 in a new building, but then closed in April 1906.

The second Rosalie Plains Provisional School opened on 29 August 1913. It was renamed Brymaroo Provisional School on 14 July 1914 and became Brymaroo State School on 1 March 1916. It closed in 1927, but on 11 June 1928 it reopened as a half-time school in conjunction with Viewfield State School. On 1 April 1930, Brymaroo State School returned to being a full-time school. The school closed permanently in March or April 1944. It was on the western side of the Jondaryan Nungil Road (27.26459°S 151.62059°E).

Nungil Provisional School opened in 1904. On 1 January 1909, it became Nungil State School. It closed in 1949. It was on a 2-acre (0.81 ha) site on Pechey-Maclagan Road (27.19506°S 151.61570°E).

Ashlea Provisional School opened in January 1907. On 1 January 1909, it became Ashlea State School, being renamed Rosalie Plains State School in 1916. It closed circa 1944. It was on the eastern side of Old Rosalie School Road (27.20427°S 151.66179°E). Despite the name, the school was in the present-day locality of Brymaroo.

St Lambert's Anglican Church was dedicated on 17 November 1911. Its closure on 25 June 1995 was approved by Assistant Bishop Wood.

During World War II, the Royal Australian Air Force established the Brymaroo Aerodrome via compulsory acquisition.

== Demographics ==
In the 2016 census Brymaroo had a population of 140 people.

In the 2021 census, Brymaroo had a population of 128 people.

== Education ==
There are no schools by Brymaroo. The nearest government primary schools are:

- Kulpi State School in neighbouring Kulpi to the north-east
- Jondaryan State School in neighbouring Jondaryan to the south
- Bowenville State School in neighbouring Bowenville to the south-west
- Quinalow State School in neighbouring Quinalow to the north

The nearest government secondary schools are:

- Quinalow State School (to Year 10) in neighbouring Quinalow
- Oakey State High School (to Year 12) in Oakey to the south-east
- Dalby State High School (to Year 12) in Dalby to the west.

== Brymaroo Aerodrome ==
Brymaroo ICAO: YBYO is a military-only satellite site located 22 kilometres from the Army Aviation base at Oakey, Queensland.

On 1 December 2018 the Australian Department of Defence issued an advisory document "Army Aviation Centre Oakey –Brymaroo Environmental Site Assessment Findings" (PDF). Australia Department of Defence. 1 December 2018. "The groundwater results indicated limited migration of PFAS in groundwater. There is no indication that PFAS is migrating in groundwater from the Site to outside of the Site boundary."
