= Peranga, Queensland =

Peranga
- Town
- Interactive map of Peranga
- Coordinates: 27.1458°S 151.6961°E
- Country: Australia
- State: Queensland
- LGA: Toowoomba Region
- Location: 44.8 km (27.8 mi) N of Oakey; 52.7 km (32.7 mi) E of Dalby; 71.9 km (44.7 mi) NNW of Toowoomba; 200 km (120 mi) WNW of Brisbane

Government
  - State electorate: Condamine
  - Federal division: Groom

Area
  - Total: 29.9 km^{2} (11.5 sq mi)

Population
  - Total: 98 (2021 census)
  - Density: 3.278/km^{2} (8.49/sq mi)
- Time zone: UTC+10:00 (AEST)
- Postcode: 4352
Localities around Peranga
Quinalow	Maclagan	Narko
Quinalow	Peranga	Evergreen
Quinalow	Kulpi	Kulpi

Peranga is a rural town and locality in the Toowoomba Region, Queensland, Australia. In the 2021 census, the locality of Peranga had a population of 98 people.

== Geography ==
Peranga is a small town on the Darling Downs, 70 kilometres (43 mi) north-west of Toowoomba and 55 kilometres (34 mi) north-east of Dalby.

== History ==
The name Peranga derives from the name of an outstation on Rosalie Plains pastoral run, assigned when the town was surveyed in 1911.

Peranga Post Office opened on 11 January 1913.

Peranga State School opened in 1915, closing on 30 July 1973.

On Sunday 25 March 1917, Archbishop James Duhig officially opened and dedicated Our Lady of the Annunciation Catholic Church. It was closed in December 2024 by Bishop Ken Howell. It was at 24-30 Church Street (27.14666°S 151.69618°E).

The Peranga & District Bowls Club opened in 1955.

The Anglican Church of St John the Evangelist was consecrated circa 1959. Its last service was held on 13 May 1961 due to a reduction in the congregation.

Peranga Methodist Church opened on 25 June 1961. When the Methodist Church amalgamated into the Uniting Church in Australia, it became Peranga Uniting Church on 22 June 1977. The last service was held in Peranga on 19 January 1997, after which the church building was relocated to Goombungee to be used as the hall for the Goombungee Uniting Church. The Goombungee church and hall were sold into private ownership in 2012 for $185,000, but the buildings are still extent (as at 2020).

Once the prosperous hub of a rich dairy-producing area, Peranga went into sharp decline after the closure of the Oakey-Cooyar railway line in the mid-1960s. The hotel burnt down in 1967, followed by the school's closure in 1973.

== Demographics ==
In the 2011 census, the locality of Peranga and surrounding area had a population of 298 people.

In the 2016 census, the locality of Peranga had a population of 85 people.

In the 2021 census, the locality of Peranga had a population of 98 people.

== Education ==
There are no schools in Peranga. The nearest government primary schools are Quinalow State School in neighbouring Quinalow to the west and Kulpi State School in neighbouring Kulpi to the south. The nearest government secondary schools are Quinalow State School (to Year 10) in Quinalow and Oakey State High School (to Year 12) in Oakey to the south.

== Amenities ==
The Peranga & District Bowls Club is still in operation. There is a post office and general store, a one-man police station and a town hall.

Together with Peranga, the surrounding towns of Quinalow (10 kilometres (6.2 mi) west), Maclagan (13 kilometres (8.1 mi) north-west) and Kulpi (9 kilometres (5.6 mi) south) are interdependent, having between them all the amenities of a small town. Kulpi has a hotel and tennis courts; Quinalow a garage, cafe, hotel, rural supplier, school, swimming pool, caravan park, library, tractor dealership, tennis courts, hall, and skate park; and Maclagan has a post office and general store, two wineries, a small museum, a butcher, a kindergarten and several parks.
