= Jondaryan, Queensland =

Jondaryan
- Town
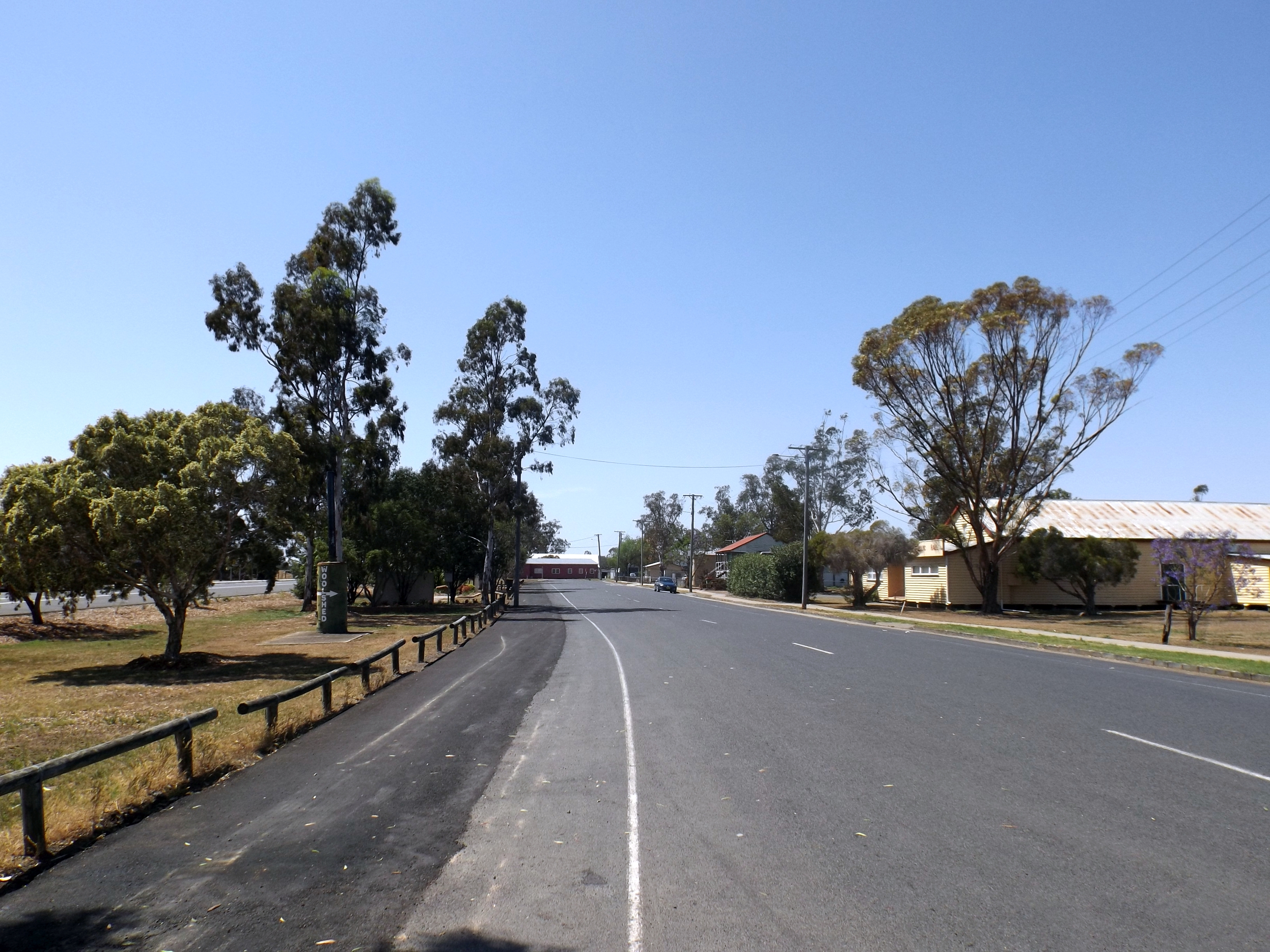
- Jondaryan Memorial Park, service road and public hall, 2014

- Interactive map of Jondaryan
- Coordinates: 27.3719°S 151.5902°E
- Country: Australia
- State: Queensland
- LGA: Toowoomba Region
- Location: 39.9 km (24.8 mi) SE of Dalby; 43.1 km (26.8 mi) NW of Toowoomba CBD; 171 km (106 mi) W of Brisbane

Government
  - State electorate: Condamine
  - Federal division: Groom

Area
  - Total: 197.1 km^{2} (76.1 sq mi)
- Elevation: 385 m (1,263 ft)

Population
  - Total: 414 (2021 census)
  - Density: 2.1005/km^{2} (5.440/sq mi)
- Time zone: UTC+10:00 (AEST)
- Postcode: 4403
Localities around Jondaryan
Bowenville	Malu; Brymaroo	Muldu
Formartin; West Prairie	Jondaryan	Acland; Devon Park; Oakey
Mount Moriah	Evanslea; Yargullen	Aubigny

Jondaryan is a rural town and locality in the Toowoomba Region, Queensland, Australia. In the 2021 census, the locality of Jondaryan had a population of 414 people.

== Geography ==
The Western railway line passes through the locality. The now-closed Jondaryan railway station (27.3679°S 151.5921°E) served the town, while the Malu railway station on the boundary of the localities of Jondaryn and Malu is still operational (27.3486°S 151.5613°E).

== History ==
The name Jondaryan derives from pastoral run name first used 1841 by Henry Dennis. It is believed to be an Aboriginal word meaning a long way off. The town was surveyed in June 1871 by surveyor G.T. Weale.

Jondaryan Post Office opened on 1 March 1867.

Alfred, Duke of Saxe-Coburg and Gotha and Duke of Edinburgh stayed overnight in Jondaryan, then the terminus of the railway line, on 26 February 1868.

Jondaryan Provisional School opened on 12 February 1872. On 31 January 1876, it became Jondaryan State School.

In June 2015, the closed St Jude's Anglican church was relocated from Acland to the Jondaryan Woolshed to be used as a wedding chapel.

== Demographics ==
In the 2016 census, the locality of Jondaryan had a population of 385 people.

In the 2021 census, the locality of Jondaryan had a population of 414 people.

== Heritage listings ==
Jondaryan has a number of heritage-listed sites, including:

- Jondaryan Homestead, Evanslea Road (27.4009°S 151.5753°E)
- Jondaryan Woolshed, Evanslea Road (27.3941°S 151.5716°E)
- St Anne's Anglican Church, Evanslea Road (27.3798°S 151.5864°E)

== Education ==
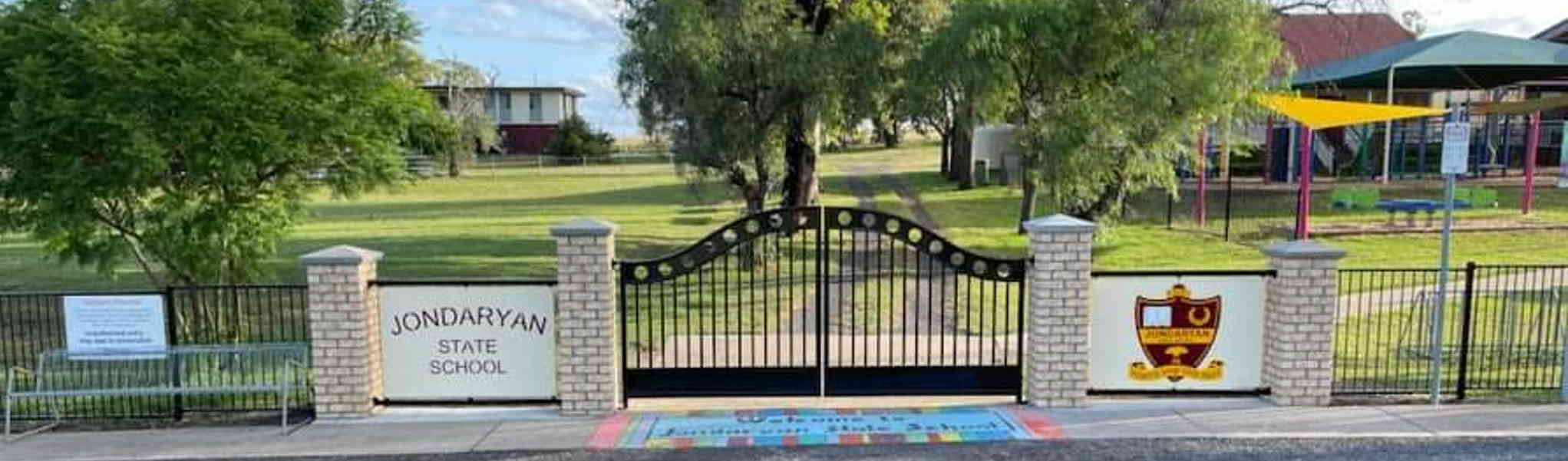
Jondaryan State School, 2022

Jondaryan State School is a government primary (Prep-6) school for boys and girls at Scott Road (27.3730°S 151.5858°E). In 2017, the school had an enrolment of 47 students with 4 teachers (3 full-time equivalent) and 6 non-teaching staff (3 full-time equivalent).

The nearest government secondary school is Oakey State High School in Oakey 16.8 km (10.4 mi) to the east.

== Facilities ==
Library services in Jondaryan are provided by the Toowoomba Regional Council's mobile library service. The van visits Jondaryan State School on the 2nd and 4th Tuesday of each month.

The Jondaryan Rural Fire Brigade Station provides Rural Fire Services to both the Jondaryan and the broader community, on a voluntary per-call basis.

== Attractions ==
The Jondaryan Woolshed is a tourist attraction at 264 Jondaryan Evanslea Road.

== Events ==
Jackie Howe Festival is held at the Woolshed at Jondaryan every year during the first weekend in September. At the festival the shearing shed comes to life under steam power. The old Australian Heritage Festival with its working historic farm machinery is now included in the Jackie Howe Festival. A major wool fashion show is a part of the Jackie Howe Festival. The best of Australian traditional country foods are featured at the festival.
