= Kulpi, Queensland =

Kulpi
- Town
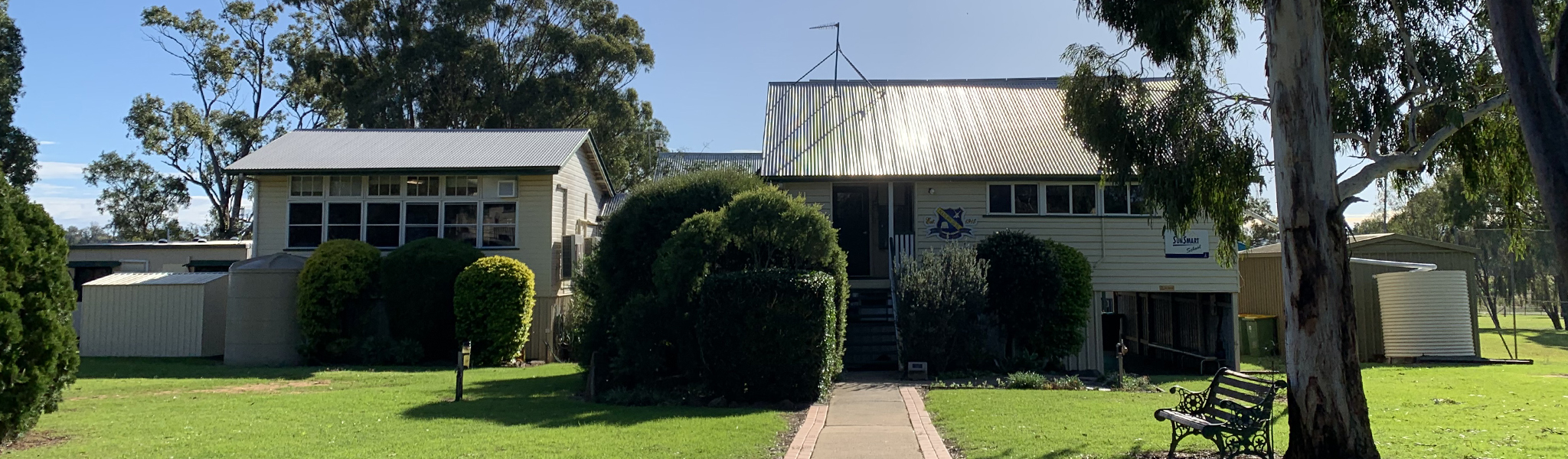
- Kulpi State School, 2020

- Interactive map of Kulpi
- Coordinates: 27.1875°S 151.7°E
- Country: Australia
- State: Queensland
- LGA: Toowoomba Region
- Location: 32.4 km (20.1 mi) N of Oakey; 59.9 km (37.2 mi) NW of Toowoomba; 188 km (117 mi) WNW of Brisbane

Government
  - State electorate: Condamine
  - Federal division: Groom

Area
  - Total: 23.5 km^{2} (9.1 sq mi)

Population
  - Total: 77 (2021 census)
  - Density: 3.277/km^{2} (8.49/sq mi)
- Time zone: UTC+10:00 (AEST)
- Postcode: 4352
Localities around Kulpi
Quinalow	Peranga	Evergreen
Quinalow	Kulpi	Mount Darry
Brymaroo	Rosalie Plains	Mount Darry

Kulpi is a rural town and locality in the Toowoomba Region, Queensland, Australia. In the 2021 census, the locality of Kulpi had a population of 77 people.

== Geography ==
Kulpi is on the Darling Downs, 194 kilometres (121 mi) north west of the state capital, Brisbane.

The Oakey–Cooyar Road runs through from south to north.

== History ==
The site of the town of Kulpi was part of a selection made by Fred Beckmann from the Rosalie Plains pastoral run. Beckman built two establishments, the Pioneer Hotel and a store which formed the centre of the town. The settlement was originally known as Rosalie, however the name was soon changed to Kulpi, to avoid confusion with the Rosalie Plains Homestead, which was a small town in itself.

The town takes its name from its railway station name assigned to 9 January 1913 by the Queensland Railways Department. It is an reportedly an Aboriginal word meaning box tree or charred logs.

Kulpi State School opened on 9 August 1915.

== Demographics ==
In the 2016 census, the locality of Kulpi had a population of 77 people.

In the 2021 census, the locality of Kulpi had a population of 77 people.

== Education ==
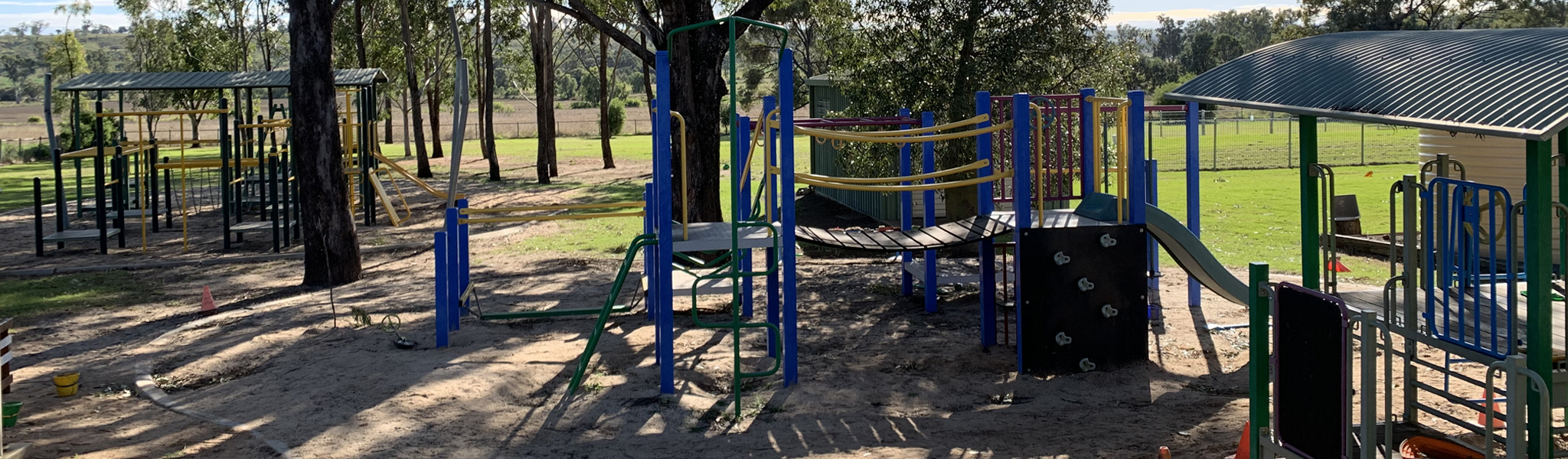
Playground, Kulpi State School, 2020

Kulpi State School is a government primary (Prep-6) school for boys and girls at 9 Beckman Street (27.1865°S 151.6999°E). In 2017, the school had an enrolment of 16 students with 3 teachers (1 full-time equivalent) and 6 non-teaching staff (2 full-time equivalent). In 2018, the school had an enrolment of 22 students with 3 teachers (1 full-time equivalent) and 7 non-teaching staff (2 full-time equivalent).

There are no secondary schools in Kulpi. The nearest government secondary schools are Quinalow State School (to Year 10) in neighbouring Quinalow to the north-west and Oakey State High School (to Year 12) in Oakey to the south.

== Facilities ==
Library services in Kulpi are provided by the Toowoomba Regional Council's mobile library service. The van visits Kulpi State School on the 1st and 3rd Tuesday of each month.
