= Quinalow =

- Town
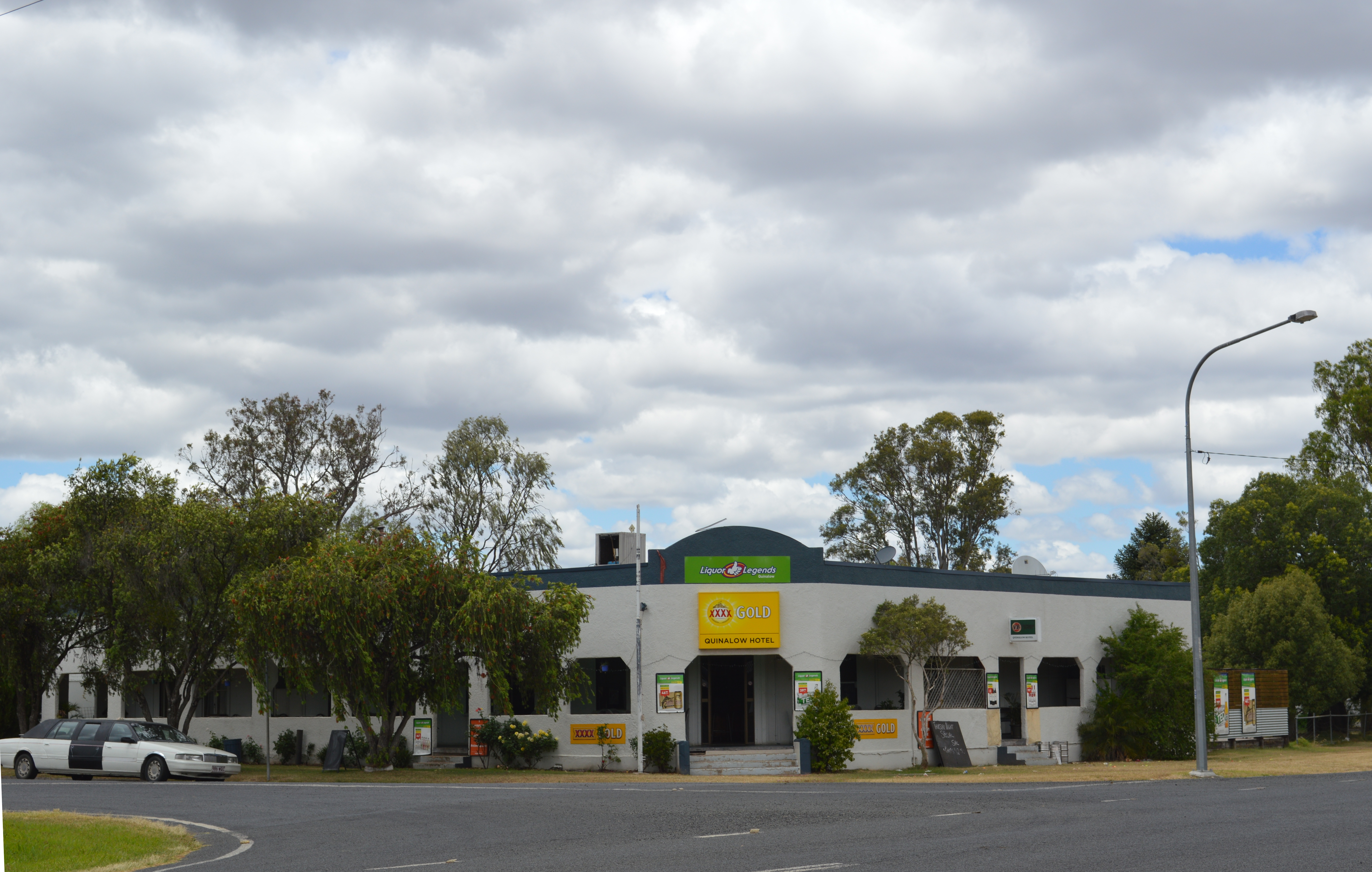
- Quinalow Hotel, 2017

- Interactive map of Quinalow
- Coordinates: 27.1080°S 151.6224°E
- Country: Australia
- State: Queensland
- LGA: Toowoomba Region
- Location: 38.5 km (23.9 mi) N of Oakey; 49.8 km (30.9 mi) E of Dalby; 65.6 km (40.8 mi) NW of Toowoomba; 196 km (122 mi) WNW of Brisbane

Government
  - State electorate: Condamine
  - Federal division: Groom

Area
  - Total: 85.8 km^{2} (33.1 sq mi)

Population
  - Total: 205 (2021 census)
  - Density: 2.389/km^{2} (6.188/sq mi)
- Time zone: UTC+10:00 (AEST)
- Postcode: 4403
Localities around Quinalow
| Moola | Malling | Maclagan |
| Irvingdale | Quinalow | Peranga |
| Brymaroo | Brymaroo | Kulpi |

Quinalow is a rural town and locality in the Toowoomba Region, Queensland, Australia. In the 2021 census, the locality of Quinalow had a population of 205 people.

== Geography ==
The town is located on Darling Downs in the north of the locality and on the bank of Myall Creek.

The Dalby–Cooyar Road runs along the northern boundary. The Pechey–Maclagan Road runs through from south to north.

== History ==
The Daly brothers established the first butter-and-cheese factory on the Darling Downs in 1889 at Quinalow. The district was named Quinalow by the Daly brothers who named it after Catholic Bishop James Quinn who encouraged Irish Catholics suffering due to the Great Famine to immigrate and settle in the area. The -alow comes from the Irish word lough meaning a brook or stream.

Quinalow Provisional School opened on 6 May 1901, with the original school building being completed on 26 February 1901 at a cost of 122 pound 17 shillings. On 1 January 1909, it became Quinalow State School. In 1965 the school offered secondary schooling. In 1985 a pre-school was added.

In August 1979 the original school building (built in 1901) was relocated to Daly Street (27.1111°S 151.6236°E), where it was used as a preschool until the new preschool building was built at the school. The original school building was then opened in March 1984 as Quinalow Library. It underwent a major refurbishment in 2014.

Quinalow was affected by the 2010–2011 Queensland floods. Rising floodwaters isolated the town, surrounding the Quinalow pub. Myall Creek was not thought to have risen as high as it did in the 1981 flood.

== Demographics ==
In the 2011 census, the locality of Quinalow had a population of 411 people.

In the 2016 census, the locality of Quinalow had a population of 173 people.

In the 2021 census, the locality of Quinalow had a population of 205 people.

== Education ==
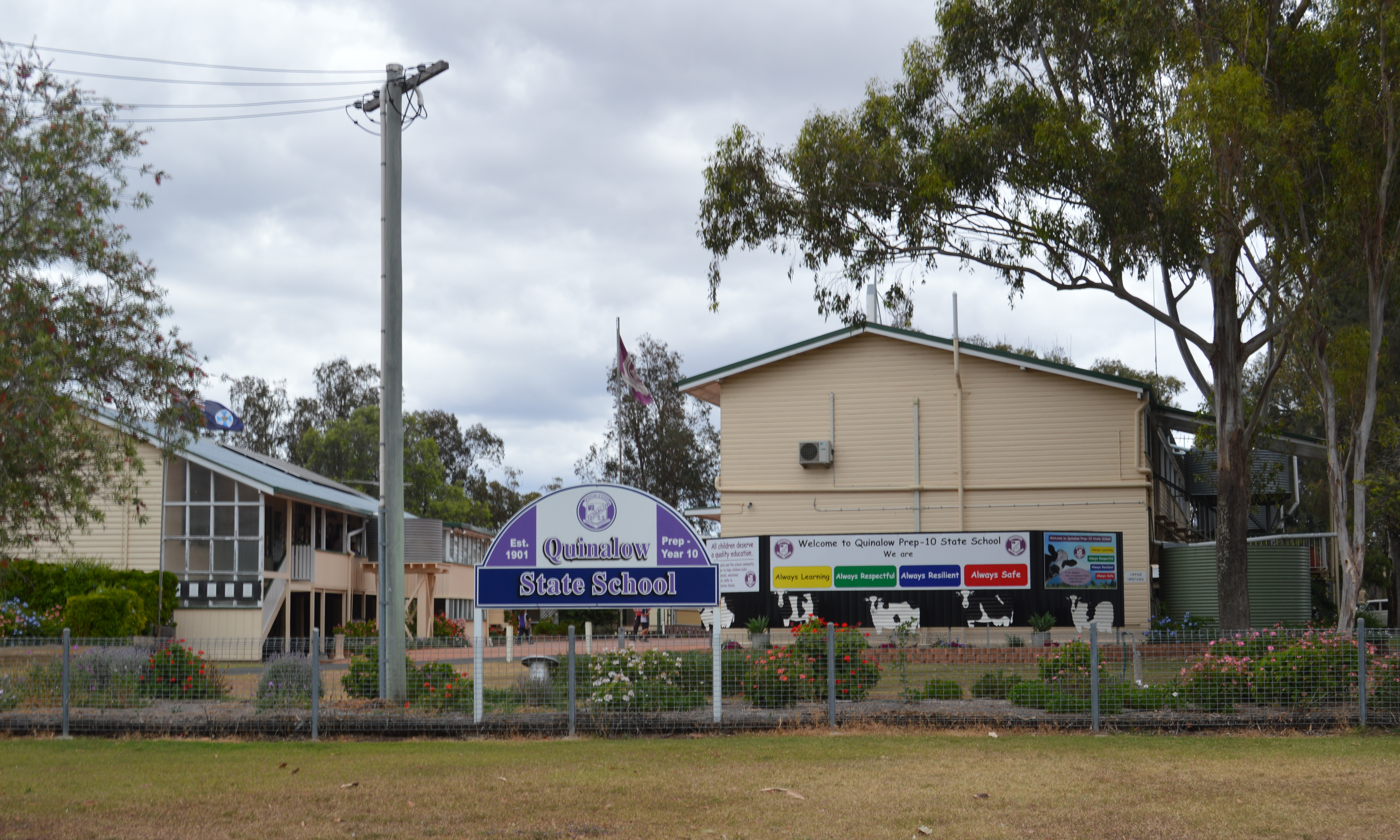
Quinalow State School, 2017

Quinalow State School is a government primary and secondary (Prep–10) school for boys and girls at 7 Progress Street (27.1076°S 151.6222°E). In 2018, the school had an enrolment of 78 students with 14 teachers (12 full-time equivalent) and 10 non-teaching staff (6 full-time equivalent).

For secondary education to Year 12, the nearest government secondary schools are Dalby State High School in Dalby to the west and Oakey State High School in Oakey to the south.

== Amenities ==
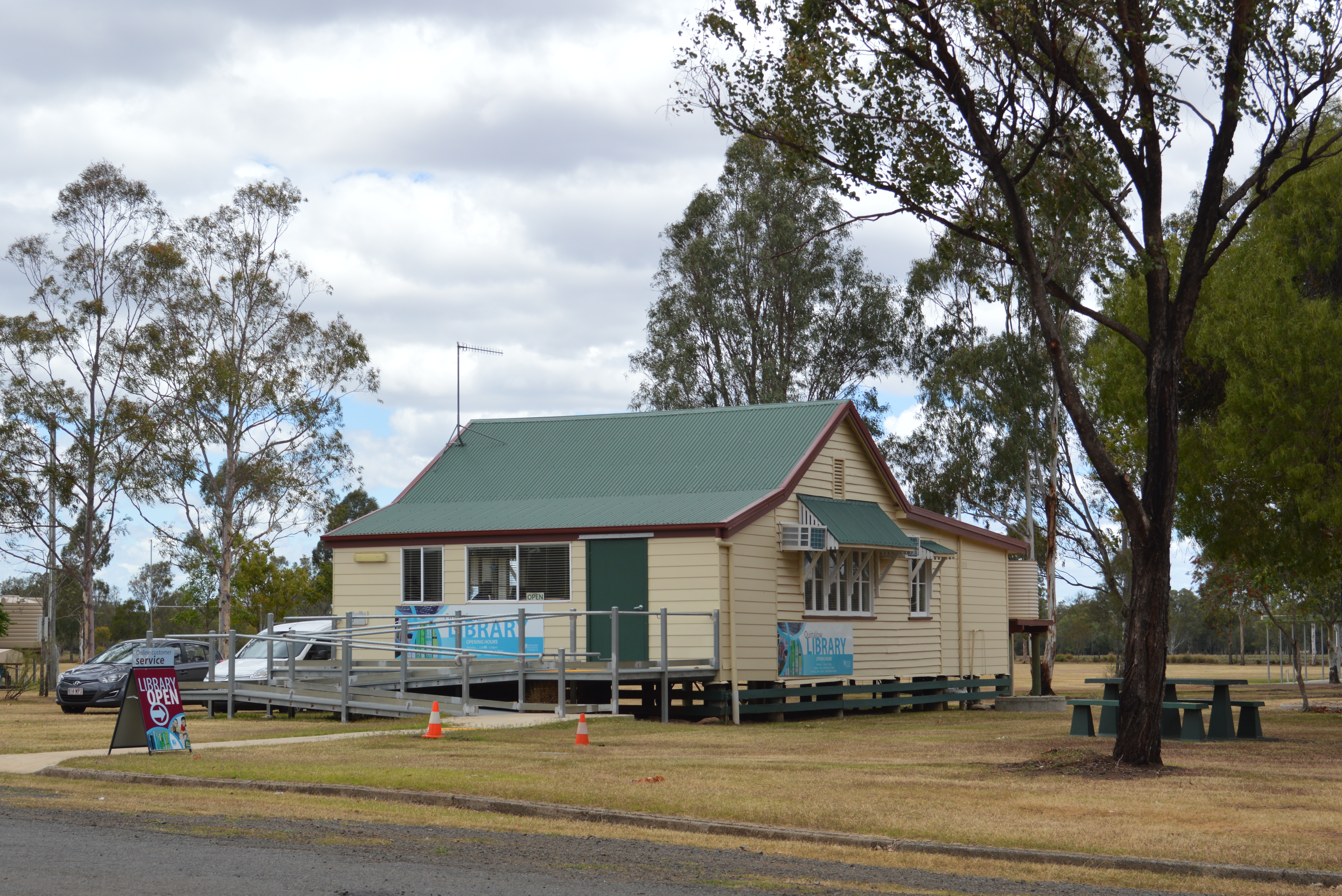
Quinalow Library, 2017

The Toowoomba Regional Council operates a public library in Daly Street.

Quinalow Public Hall is on the corner of Daly Street and Pechey Maclagan Road (27.1110°S 151.6230°E).
