= List of schools in Darling Downs =

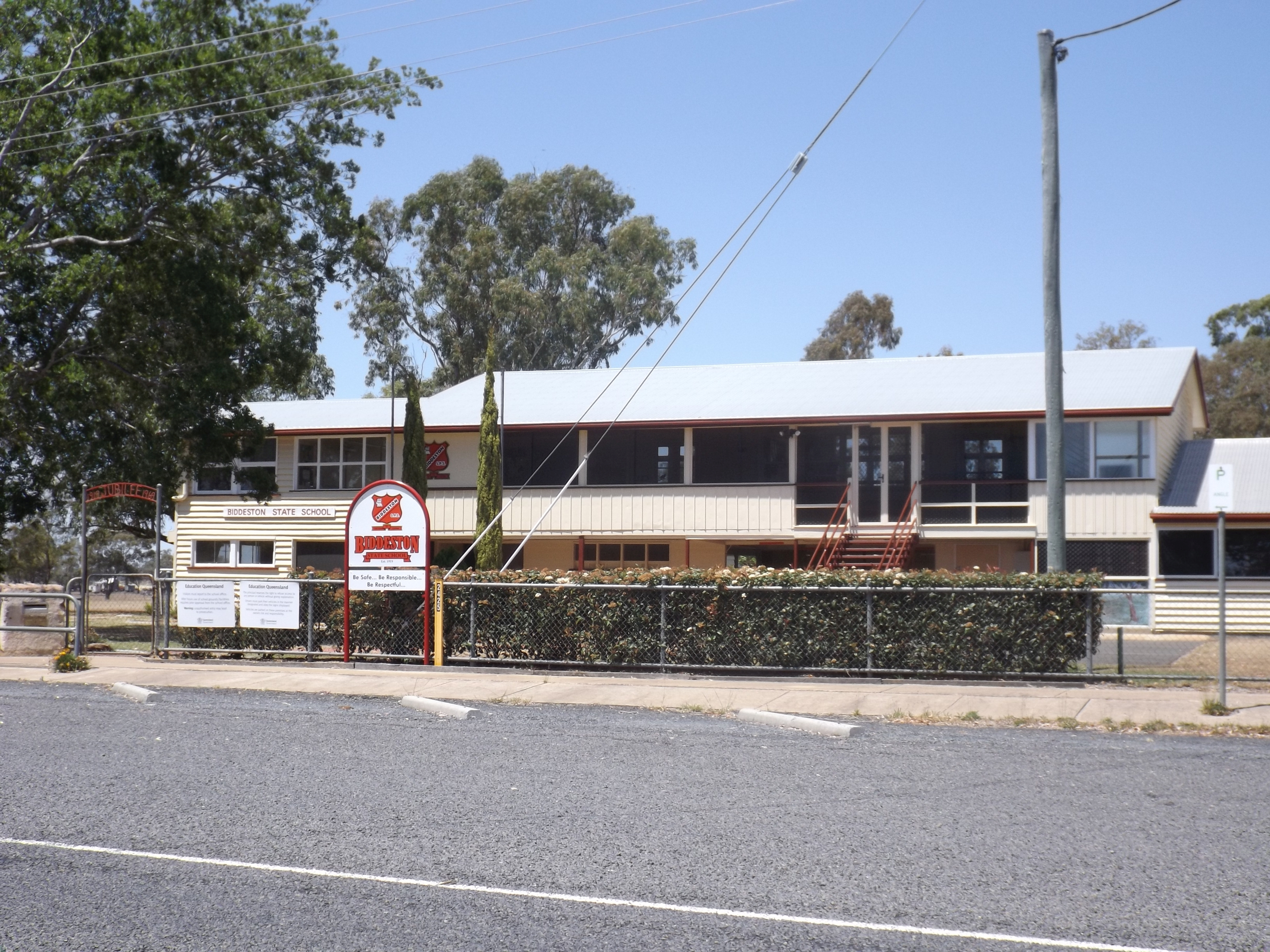
Biddeston State School, Biddeston, 2014

This is a list of schools in the Darling Downs region of Queensland, Australia, and includes schools in South West Queensland. The region is centred on the inland city of Toowoomba and the towns of Dalby, Roma, St George and Charleville. It includes the local government areas of Shire of Balonne, Shire of Bulloo, Goondiwindi Region, Maranoa Region, Shire of Murweh, Shire of Paroo, Shire of Quilpie, Southern Downs Region, Toowoomba Region, and Western Downs Region.

Prior to 2015, the Queensland education system consisted of primary schools, which accommodated students from Kindergarten to Year 7 (ages 5–13), and high schools, which accommodate students from Years 8 to 12 (ages 12–18). However, from 2015, Year 7 became the first year of high school.

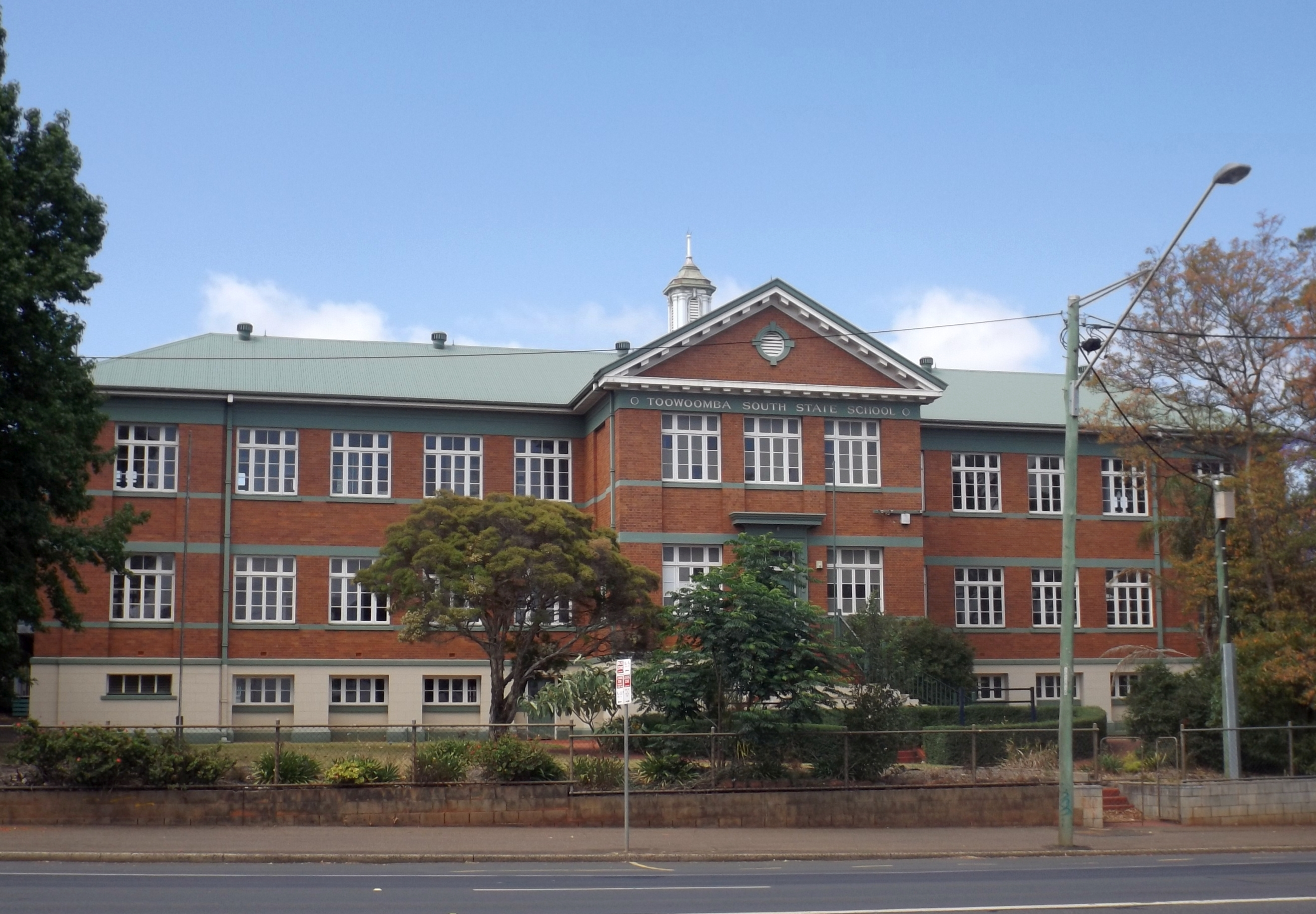
Toowoomba South State School, 2014

== State schools ==
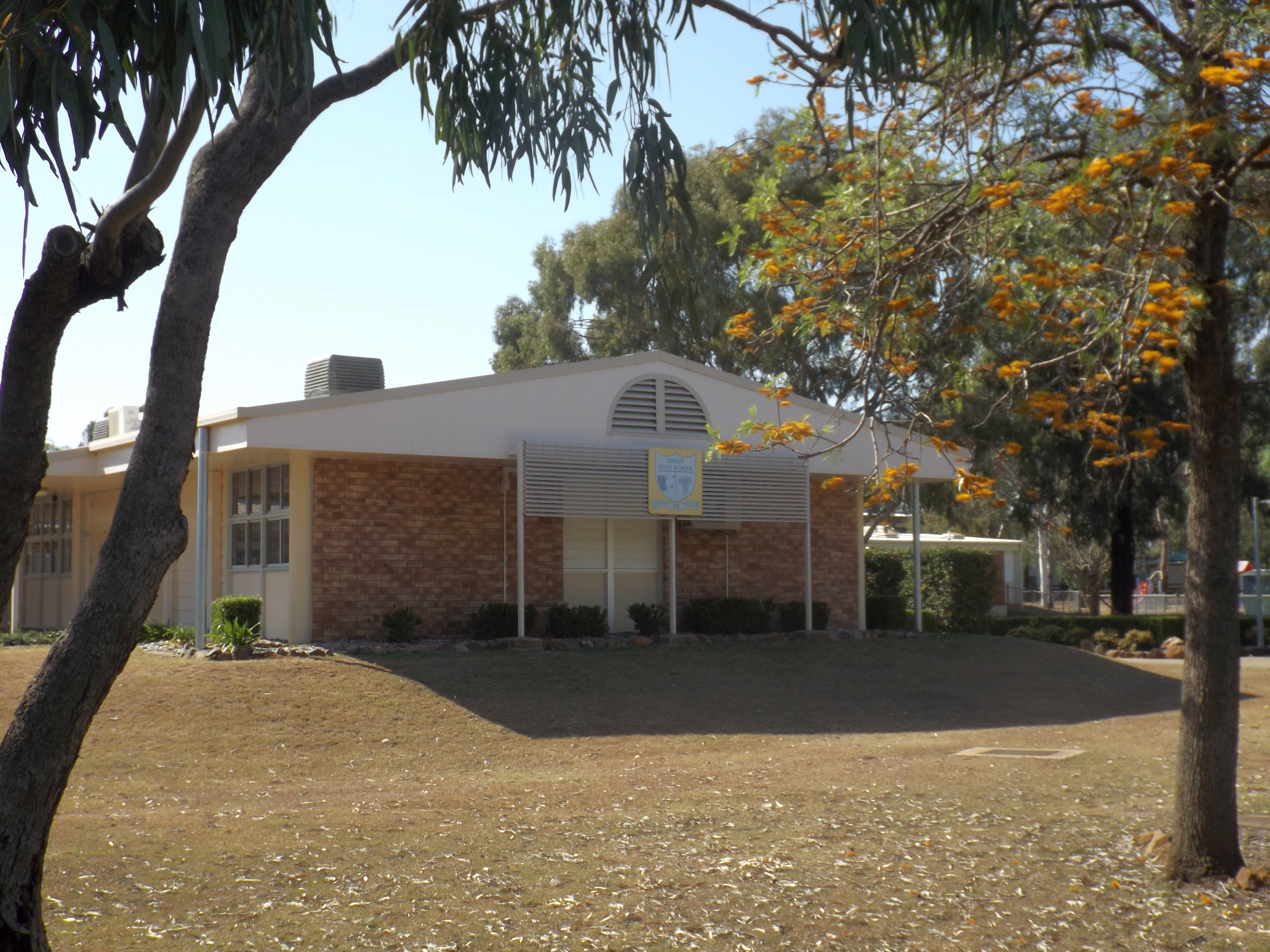
Oakey State School was established in 1874

=== State primary schools ===
Name	Suburb	LGA	Opened	Coords	Notes
Allora P-10 State School	Allora	Southern Downs	1867	28.0361°S 151.9861°E	At 21 Warwick Street.
Amiens State School	Amiens	Southern Downs	1919	28.5945°S 151.8126°E	At 1337 Amiens Road.
Applethorpe State School	Applethorpe	Southern Downs	1911	28.6125°S 151.9553°E	At 25576 New England Highway
Augathella State School	Augathella	Murweh	1884	25.7971°S 146.5833°E	On Cavanagh Street.
Back Plains State School	Back Plains	Toowoomba	1879	27.8926°S 151.7842°E	Originally opened as Clifton Homestead Area School, renamed Back Plains State School circa 1919. Located at 874 Clifton-Pittsworth Highway.
Ballandean State School	Ballandean	Southern Downs	1909	28.7986°S 151.8414°E	On Bent's Road.
Begonia State School	Begonia	Maranoa	1970	27.4917°S 148.3249°E	On Begonia Road off Mitchell St George Road.
Bell State School	Bell	Western Downs	1907	26.9397°S 151.4529°E	P–10. At 90 Dennis Street.
Biddeston State School	Biddeston	Toowoomba	1919	27.5541°S 151.6973°E	At 2425 Cecil Plains Road.
Bollon State School	Bollon	Balonne	1885	28.0315°S 147.4756°E	At 60–74 Main Street.
Bowenville State School	Bowenville	Toowoomba	1898–1953	approx 27.30284°S 151.48782°E	Located south-west of the railway line near Blaxland Road.
Bowenville State School	Bowenville	Toowoomba	1954-	27.3037°S 151.4939°E	Located at 2 Irvingdale Road, corner of Grant Street.
Brigalow State School	Brigalow	Western Downs	1908	26.8364°S 150.7792°E	On the southern side of the Warrego Highway.
Broadwater State School	Broadwater	Southern Downs	1903	28.6555°S 151.8786°E	At 636–638 Texas Road (corner of Caslick Lane).
Brookstead State School	Brookstead	Toowoomba	1915–1951		The 1915 site was on Pittsworth Road about half a mile east of Brookstead railway station and to the south of the intersection of the railway line and the Gore Highway.
Brookstead State School	Brookstead	Toowoomba	1951-	27.7580°S 151.4505°E	Following ongoing problems with the school grounds being waterlogged after heavy rains, in 1951 the school was relocated to 30 Ware Street with an adjacent teacher's residence built in 1958.
Bungunya State School	Bungunya	Goondiwindi	1918	28.4270°S 149.6545°E	On George Street. As at 2024, the school is open, but, as it had no students enrolled, it was not operational.
Bunker's Hill State School	Westbrook	Toowoomba	1889	27.6060°S 151.8333°E	At 315 Bunkers Hill School Road.
Burra Burri State School	Burra Burri	Western Downs	1918	26.5093°S 151.0237°E	Originally opened as Burra Burri Junction Provisional School. It was later called Washpool State School before taking on the current name. At 3173 Burra Burri Creek Road.
Bymount East State School	Bymount	Maranoa	1945	26.0638°S 148.6026°E	6441 Carnarvon Highway.
Cambooya State School	Cambooya	Toowoomba	1882	27.7087°S 151.8668°E	At 6 Harrow Street.
Cecil Plains State School	Cecil Plains	Toowoomba	1898	27.5323°S 151.1928°E	Prep to Year 9, Taylor Street.
Charleville State School	Charleville	Murweh	1875	26.4048°S 146.2423°E	At 54–56 Wills Street.
Chinchilla State School	Chinchilla	Western Downs	1883	26.7403°S 150.6259°E	34–40 Bell Street.
Clifton State School	Clifton	Toowoomba	1876	27.9317°S 151.9042°E	At 1 Tooth Street.
Condamine State School	Condamine	Western Downs	1863	26.9250°S 150.1346°E	On Kennedy Street.
Cooyar State School	Cooyar	Toowoomba	1905	26.9852°S 151.8328°E	On Gracey Street.
Crow's Nest State School	Crows Nest	Toowoomba	1877–1959	approx 27.26448°S 152.05992°E	Primary only. On a five-acre (2.0 ha) site on the western side of Dale Street (now Dale Street South).
Crow's Nest State School	Crows Nest	Toowoomba	1959	27.2648°S 152.0521°E	P–10. At 1 Littleton Street.
Dalby South State School	Dalby	Western Downs	1965	27.1948°S 151.2701°E	At 65 Owen Street, corner of Bunya Street.
Dalby State School	Dalby	Western Downs	1861	27.1846°S 151.2623°E	At 155 Cunningham Street.
Dalveen State School	Dalveen	Southern Downs	1878	28.4898°S 151.9735°E	Originally known as Stanthorpe Road Provisional School, then changed name to North Maryland State School, before taking on the current name. Located at 40 Pine Crescent.
Darling Heights State School	Darling Heights	Toowoomba	1980	27.5974°S 151.9323°E	On Wuth Street.
Dirranbandi State School	Dirranbandi	Balonne	1902	28.5770°S 148.2300°E	P–10. On Jane Street.
Drayton State School	Drayton	Toowoomba	1851	27.6025°S 151.9117°E	At 71–89 Brisbane Street.
Drillham State School	Drillham	Western Downs	1899	26.6443°S 149.9815°E	At 13 Jardine Street.
Dulacca State School	Dulacca	Western Downs	1909	26.6423°S 149.7569°E	On the north-east corner of North Road and Glynn Avenue.
Dunkeld State School	Dunkeld	Maranoa	1965	26.9579°S 148.0603°E	On Mitchell-St George Road.
Emu Creek State School	East Greenmount	Toowoomba	1875	27.7833°S 151.9448°E	At 14534 New England Highway.
Eromanga State School	Eromanga	Quilpie	1897	26.6692°S 143.2686°E	Open in the following years: 1897–1908, 1910–1911, 1917–1936, 1967–1981, 1990–present. On Donald Street.
Eulo State School	Eulo	Paroo	1888	28.1575°S 145.0504°E	On the southern corner of Leo Street and Emu Street.
Fairview Heights State School	Wilsonton	Toowoomba	1995	27.5350°S 151.9115°E	At 75 McDougall Street.
Freestone State School	Freestone	Southern Downs	1870	28.1355°S 152.1377°E	At 82 School Road.
Gabbinbar State School	Centenary Heights	Toowoomba	1972	27.5959°S 151.9692°E	At 189 Stenner Street.
Geham State School	Geham	Toowoomba	1871	27.4063°S 151.9959°E	At 9625 New England Highway.
Glen Aplin State School	Glen Aplin	Southern Downs	1887	28.7387°S 151.8730°E	At 54 Mount Stirling Road.
Glenmorgan State School	Glenmorgan	Western Downs	1933	27.2474°S 149.6755°E	On the western side of Clive Street.
Glennie Heights State School	Glennie Heights	Southern Downs	1960	28.2010°S 152.0291°E	At 5–12 Gillam Street.
Glenvale State School	Glenvale	Toowoomba	1882	27.5625°S 151.9028°E	At 224 Glenvale Road.
Goombungee State School	Goombungee	Toowoomba	1881	27.3020°S 151.8525°E	At 52 Mocatta Street.
Goondiwindi State School	Goondiwindi	Goondiwindi	1864	28.5432°S 150.3062°E	At 34 George Street.
Gowrie State School	Gowrie Junction	Toowoomba	1878	27.4915°S 151.8914°E	Opened as Gowrie Junction State School in 1878. Renamed Gowrie State School in 1963. Located at 22 Old Homebush Road.
Greenlands State School	Greenlands	Southern Downs	1915	28.6608°S 151.8274°E	Formerly Thorndale SS until 1924. At 1209 Texas Road.
Greenmount State School	Greenmount	Toowoomba	1901	27.7893°S 151.9067°E	At 9–11 Haldon Street.
Grosmont State School	Grosmont	Western Downs	1957	25.9777°S 149.8030°E	At 2524 Grosmont Road.
Guluguba State School	Guluguba	Western Downs	1917	26.2567°S 150.0441°E	On Fosters Road.
Haden State School	Haden	Toowoomba	1912	27.2241°S 151.8892°E	At 1520 Haden-Crow's Nest Road.
Hannaford State School	Hannaford	Western Downs	1947	27.3404°S 150.0607°E	On Hannaford Road.
Harlaxton State School	Harlaxton	Toowoomba	1901	27.5398°S 151.9545°E	At 110 Ruthven Street.
Harristown State School	Harristown	Toowoomba	1911	27.5752°S 151.9339°E	At 332 South Street.
Hebel State School	Hebel	Balonne	1901	28.9709°S 147.7910°E	In Maud Street.
Highfields State School	Highfields	Toowoomba	1870	27.4628°S 151.9557°E	At 10459 New England Highway.
Inglewood State School	Inglewood	Goondiwindi	1872	28.4161°S 151.0770°E	Prep to Year 10. At Chilcott Street.
Injune State School	Injune	Maranoa	1921	25.8467°S 148.5651°E	Prep to Year 10. On the corner of Hutton Street and Fourth Avenue.
Jandowae State School	Jandowae	Western Downs	1887	26.7797°S 151.1127°E	Prep to Year 10. At 44 George Street.
Jimbour State School	Jimbour	Western Downs	1873	26.9630°S 151.2163°E	At 2421 Dalby-Jandowae Road.
Jondaryan State School	Jondaryan	Toowoomba	1872	27.3730°S 151.5858°E	In Scott Road.
Kaimkillenbun State School	Kaimkillenbun	Western Downs	1909	27.0582°S 151.4320°E	At 2–14 Messenger Street.
Karara State School	Karara	Southern Downs	1908	28.2037°S 151.5652°E	Originally known as Canal State School, then Canal Creek State School. In Karara School Road.
Killarney State School	Killarney	Southern Downs	1874	28.3413°S 152.2978°E	Prep to Year 10. At 7 Acacia Street.
Kindon State School	Kindon	Goondiwindi	1963	28.0801°S 150.7394°E	At 14034 Gore Highway.
Kingsthorpe State School	Kingsthorpe	Toowoomba	1911	27.4719°S 151.8145°E	At 50 Goombungee Road.
Kogan State School	Kogan	Western Downs	1897	27.0382°S 150.7578°E	On the south side of High Street.
Kulpi State School	Kulpi	Toowoomba	1915	27.1865°S 151.6999°E	At 9 Beckman Street.
Leyburn State School	Leyburn	Southern Downs	1862	28.0132°S 151.5783°E	At 34 Peter Street.
Lundavra State School	Lundavra	Goondiwindi	1964	28.0702°S 149.9820°E	At 238 Lienassie Road.
Maryvale State School	Maryvale	Southern Downs	1913	28.0674°S 152.2420°E	At 81 Taylor Street.
Meandarra State School	Meandarra	Western Downs	1915	27.3240°S 149.8822°E	In Sara Street.
Meringandan State School	Meringandan West	Toowoomba	1876	27.4303°S 151.9050°E	At 10 School Road in Meringandan West.
Middle Ridge State School	Middle Ridge	Toowoomba	1884	27.6017°S 151.9564°E	At 203 Spring Street.
Miles State School	Miles	Western Downs	1880	26.6568°S 150.1856°E	Early Childhood to Year 6. In Constance Street.
Millmerran State School	Millmerran	Toowoomba	1882	27.8782°S 151.2654°E	Prep to Year 10. Yandilla Provisional School opened on 2 October 1882. In 1901, it was renamed Millmerran Provisional School. On 1 January 1909, it became Millmerran State School. At 19 Simmons Street.
Mitchell State School	Mitchell	Maranoa	1876	26.4885°S 147.9715°E	P–10. At 105 Cambridge Street. The Mitchell State School (1914 Building) was listed on the Queensland Heritage Register in 1994, but the building was removed as part of an approved development and its heritage listing cancelled in 2015.
Moonie State School	Moonie	Western Downs	1962	27.7138°S 150.3732°E	At 11305 Moonie Highway.
Morven State School	Morven	Murweh	1887	26.4156°S 147.1098°E	On Albert Street.
Mount Tyson State School	Mount Tyson	Toowoomba	1904	27.5746°S 151.5694°E	At Main Street.
Mungallala State School	Mungallala	Maranoa	1904	26.4446°S 147.5450°E	At 24 Redford Street.
Murray's Bridge State School	Murrays Bridge	Southern Downs	1937	28.2929°S 152.1179°E	At 1378 Killarney Road.
Newtown State School	Newtown	Toowoomba	1924	27.5586°S 151.9352°E	At 24 Albert Street.
Nobby State School	Nobby	Toowoomba	1897	27.8524°S 151.9060°E	At 4 Davenport Street.
Oakey State School	Oakey	Toowoomba	1874	27.4393°S 151.7205°E	At 24 Campbell Street.
Pilton State School	Pilton	Toowoomba	1913	27.8679°S 152.0497°E	At 24 Pilton Valley Road. There was a previous Pilton Provisional School (1884–1907).
Pittsworth State School	Pittsworth	Toowoomba	1882	27.7183°S 151.6340°E	Early Childhood to Year 6. At 42 Hume Street.
Pozieres State School	Pozieres	Southern Downs	1921	28.5248°S 151.8847°E	At 45–47 Pozieres School Road.
Quinalow State School	Quinalow	Toowoomba	1901	27.1076°S 151.6222°E	P–10. 7 Progress Street.
Ramsay State School	Ramsay	Toowoomba	1881	27.7216°S 151.9625°E	At 173 Ramsay School Road.
Rangeville State School	Rangeville	Toowoomba	1909	27.5830°S 151.9783°E	At 32A High Street.
Rockville State School	Rockville	Toowoomba	1922	27.5311°S 151.9364°E	At 3 Holberton Street.
Severnlea State School	Severnlea	Southern Downs	1918	28.7023°S 151.9087°E	Opened 1918 as Beverley State School, renamed 1922 Severnlea State School. At 14 Turner Road.
Southbrook Central State School	Southbrook	Toowoomba	1910	27.6781°S 151.7042°E	Opened 1910 as Elville State School, renamed circa 1916 Southbrook Central State School. At 1 School Road.
St George State School	St George	Balonne	1874	28.0377°S 148.5807°E	At 128 Victoria Street (corner of Grey Street).
Stanthorpe State School	Stanthorpe	Southern Downs	1874	28.6498°S 151.9343°E	Early Childhood to Year 6. On Marsh Street.
Surat State School	Surat	Maranoa	1874	27.1543°S 149.0670°E	P–10. At 55 Robert Street.
Talwood State School	Talwood	Goondiwindi	1918	28.4866°S 149.4703°E	At 17 Recreation Street
Teelba State School	Teelba	Maranoa	1965	27.5345°S 149.3939°E	On Teelba Road just north of the crossing of Teelba Creek.
Texas State School	Texas	Goondiwindi	1887	28.8506°S 151.1742°E	Prep to Year 10. At 1 Flemming Street.
Thallon State School	Thallon	Balonne	1911	28.6336°S 148.8677°E	At 15 Henry Street.
Thargomindah State School	Thargomindah	Bulloo	1884	27.9952°S 143.8267°E	At 1 Dowling Street.
The Gums State School	The Gums	Western Downs	1913	27.3414°S 150.1994°E	At 12051 Surat Developmental Road.
The Summit State School	The Summit	Southern Downs	1921	28.5790°S 151.9552°E	At 34 Taggart's Road.
Thulimbah State School	Thulimbah	Southern Downs	1914	28.5365°S 151.9361°E	At 146 Thulimbah School Road.
Toowoomba East State School	East Toowoomba	Toowoomba	1887	27.5599°S 151.9659°E	At 115-127 Mary Street (corner of Arthur Street). Listed on the Queensland Heritage Register.
Toowoomba North State School	Toowoomba City	Toowoomba	1869	27.5565°S 151.9487°E	At 139 Mort Street (south-west corner with Taylor Street). Listed on the Queensland Heritage Register.
Vale View State School	Vale View	Toowoomba	1931	27.6605°S 151.8972°E	873 Drayton Connection Road
Wallangarra State School	Wallangarra	Southern Downs	1888	28.9184°S 151.9313°E	50 Callandoon Street
Wallumbilla State School	Wallumbilla	Maranoa	1893	26.5843°S 149.1861°E	P–10. At 22 High Street.
Wandoan State School	Wandoan	Western Downs	1911	26.1187°S 149.9614°E	P–10. At 49 North Street.
Warra State School	Warra	Western Downs	1881	26.9302°S 150.9176°E	In Robinson Street.
Warwick Central State School	Warwick	Southern Downs	1875	28.2177°S 152.0294°E	On the north-west corner of Guy and Percy Streets. Listed on the Queensland Heritage Register.
Warwick East State School	Warwick	Southern Downs	1850	28.2147°S 152.0385°E	At 45 Fitzroy Street. Listed on the Queensland Heritage Register.
Warwick West State School	Warwick	Southern Downs	1956	28.2211°S 152.0148°E	Early Childhood to Year 6. At 17 George Street.
Wellcamp State School	Wellcamp	Toowoomba	1899	27.5538°S 151.8507°E	At 609 Drayton-Wellcamp Road. Listed on the Queensland Heritage Register.
Westmar State School	Westmar	Western Downs	1962	27.9197°S 149.7195°E	At 18425 Moonie Highway.
Wheatvale State School	Wheatvale	Southern Downs	1897	28.1658°S 151.8796°E	At 4194 Leyburn-Cunningham Road.
Wilsonton State School	Wilsonton	Toowoomba	1894	27.5429°S 151.9221°E	429 Bridge Street.
Wyandra State School	Wyandra	Paroo	1898	27.2454°S 145.9779°E	At 42 Cooper Street, corner of Moody Street.
Wyreema State School	Wyreema	Toowoomba	1895	27.6586°S 151.8550°E	At 12 High Street.
Yangan State School	Yangan	Southern Downs	1874	28.1976°S 152.2155°E	Originally known as Swan Creek No. 2 State School, then changed name to Swan Creek Upper until taking on the present name in 1887. 49A King Street.
Yarraman State School	Yarraman	Toowoomba	1901–1914		Yarraman Creek Provisional School opened on 17 July 1901 with 10 students, some miles east of the current school site. On 1 January 1909, it became Yarraman Creek State School.
Yarraman State School	Yarraman	Toowoomba	1914-	26.8415°S 151.9767°E	On 31 August 1914, a new school site was established with a new school building. In 1935, it was renamed Yarraman State School. In 1963, the school expanded to include a secondary department with an initial enrolment of 47 students. In 1980, a pre-school was added. P–9 school at 17 John Street.
Yelarbon State School	Yelarbon	Goondiwindi	1912	28.5743°S 150.7536°E	At 17 Eena Street.
Yuleba State School	Yuleba	Maranoa	1880	26.6145°S 149.3819°E	Previously known as Baltinglass Provisional School and Yeulba State School.

=== State high schools and colleges ===
Name	Suburb	LGA	Opened	Coordinates	Notes
Centenary Heights State High School	Centenary Heights	Toowoomba	1968	27.5794°S 151.9637°E	At 60 Ramsay Street.
Charleville State High School	Charleville	Murweh	1961	26.3974°S 146.2574°E	On the northern corner of Partridge and Hunter Streets.
Chinchilla State High School	Chinchilla	Western Downs	1963	26.7487°S 150.6199°E	At 7 Tara Road.
Clifton State High School	Clifton	Toowoomba	1966	27.9339°S 151.9168°E	At 32 East Street.
Cunnamulla State School	Cunnamulla	Paroo	1877	28.0711°S 145.6793°E	P–12. At 17 Francis Street.
Dalby State High School	Dalby	Western Downs	1954	27.1781°S 151.2595°E	At 26 Nicholson Street. Listed on the Queensland Heritage Register
Goondiwindi State High School	Goondiwindi	Goondiwindi	1964	28.5373°S 150.2971°E	At 3 Sandhurst Street
Harristown State High School	Harristown	Toowoomba	1955	27.5746°S 151.9317°E	At 341-367 South Street.
Highfields State Secondary College	Highfields	Toowoomba	2015	27.4466°S 151.9511°E	At 10 O'Brien Road.
Miles State High School	Miles	Western Downs	1979	26.6535°S 150.1851°E	On Pine Street.
Oakey State High School	Oakey	Toowoomba	1964	27.4450°S 151.7193°E	At 1 Campbell Street.
Pittsworth State High School	Pittsworth	Toowoomba	1967	27.7090°S 151.6455°E	At Factory Street.
Quilpie State College	Quilpie	Quilpie	1918		P–12
Roma State College	Roma	Maranoa	2006	26.5736°S 148.7875°E	P–12, operating over 3 locations with the Junior Campus (Early Childhood to Year 2) at 28 Bowen Street.
Roma State College	Roma	Maranoa	2006	26.5655°S 148.7781°E	Middle Campus (Years 3–6) on Cottell Street.
Roma State College	Roma	Maranoa	2006	26.5670°S 148.7792°E	Senior Campus (Years 7–12) on Timbury Street.
St George State High School	St George	Balonne	1978	28.0304°S 148.5927°E	At 2 Victoria Street.
Stanthorpe State High School	Stanthorpe	Southern Downs	1961	28.6456°S 151.9317°E	At 2 McGlew Street.
Tara Shire State College	Tara	Western Downs	1912	27.2799°S 150.4588°E	Tara State School until 2004, now a P–12 college. P–12. At 22 Binnie Street.
Toowoomba State High School	Mount Lofty	Toowoomba	1919	27.5452°S 151.9648°E	On Stuart Street.
Wilsonton State High School	Wilsonton Heights	Toowoomba	1998	27.5376°S 151.9243°E	At 275 North Street.
Warwick State High School	Warwick	Southern Downs	1912–1914		Corner of Fitzroy and Guy Streets.
Warwick State High School	Warwick	Southern Downs	1914-	28.2103°S 152.0335°E	At 15 Palmerin Street. Listed on the Queensland Heritage Register.

=== Other state schools ===
This includes special schools (schools for disabled children) and schools for specific purposes.

Name	Suburb	LGA	Opened	Coords	Notes
Charleville School of Distance Education	Charleville	Murweh	1966		Distance education (Prep–10). At 230 Parry Street (on the Charleville State High School site).
Clifford Park Special School	Newtown	Toowoomba	1990	27.5638°S 151.9250°E	Special secondary (7–12) school at 19 Rob Street.
Toowoomba West Special School	Newtown	Toowoomba	1975	27.5476°S 151.9407°E	Special primary (Early Childhood-6) school at 26 Gladstone Street.

=== Defunct state schools ===
Name	Suburb	LGA	Opened	Closed	Coords	Notes
Acland State School	Acland	Toowoomba	1921	2005	27.3054°S 151.6918°E	The school faced Allen Street and was bounded by Allen Street, William Street, Bellevue Street and South Streets.
Adavale State School	Adavale	Quilpie	1888	1968	25.9063°S 144.5985°E	Located on Nelson Street.
Allan State School	Allan	Southern Downs	1872	1967	28.1866°S 151.9526°E	Originally Sandy Creek Provisional School. Name changed to Allan State School in 1930. Located at 280 Sandy Creek Road. Listed on the Queensland Heritage Register.
Amby State School	Amby	Maranoa	1894	1997	26.5469°S 148.1858°E	Located in School Street.
Anduramba State School	Anduramba	Toowoomba	1912	1959	27.1436°S 152.0947°E	Located in McGreevy Road.
Apple Vale State School	Apple Vale (Ballandean)	Southern Downs	1914	1927	28.8162°S 151.8074°E	Located on the south-west corner of Sundown Road and Mcmeniman Road.
Apunyal State School	Macalister	Western Downs	1894	circa 1935	approx 27.07019°S 151.10762°E	Opened 1894 as Macalister Provisional School, later Macalister State School. Renamed 1913 as Apunyal State School. Located on the western corner of the junction of the Warrego Highway and Pirrinuan Apunyal Road.
Athol State School	Athol	Toowoomba	1887	1962	27.6043°S 151.7504°E	Located on the north-east corner of Athol School Road and Berghofer Road.
Aubigny State School	Aubigny	Toowoomba	1921	1967	27.5204°S 151.6455°E	Located at 1309 Oakey Pittsworth Road.
Auburn River State School	Sujeewong	Western Downs	1969	2008	25.8485°S 150.5685°E	Located at 11779 Auburn Road (on the south-west corner of Arndts Road).
Baking Board State School	Baking Board	Western Downs	1909	1961	approx 26.7082°S 150.5440°E	Located near the Warrego Highway.
Bapaume State School	Bapaume	Southern Downs	1925	1982	28.57637°S 151.84539°E	On a five-acre (2.0 ha) site at 843–853 Cannon Creek Road. As at December 2020, the school building was still on the site.
Barabanbel State School	Forestvale	Maranoa	1921	1932	approx 26.3347°S 148.0018°E	Located on the south-eastern corner of Mitchell Forest Vale Road and Well Gully Road.
Baradilla State School	near Mungallala	Maranoa	1912	1934		
Barakula State School	Barakula	Western Downs	1912	1982	approx 26.4273°S 150.5027°E	Originally known as Wongongera Sawmills Provisional School. Located within Barakula State Forest.
Beardmore State School	Southwood	Western Downs	1960	1997		Located in Bendee Road, Southwood
Beebo State School	Beebo	Goondiwindi	1901	1964		
Belah State School	Wychie	Western Downs	1915	1932	26.7601°S 150.8508°E	Blackwood Provisional School opened on 19 July 1915 and closed on 27 October 1932. In 1921, the school was on Inverai Road.
Belah State School	Wychie	Western Downs	1932	1962	26.7832°S 150.8855°E	On 12 November 1932, the school was reopened and renamed Belah State School. It closed in 1962. In 1938, the school was at 1249 Ehlma Boundary Road. It closed in 1962.
Bellview State School	via Nobby	Toowoomba	1920	1949		
Beranga Provisional School	Noorindoo	Maranoa	c.1922	1929		
Beranga Bridge Provisional School	Noorindoo	Maranoa	1896	1900		
Berat State School	Berat	Southern Downs	1887	1944	28.0387°S 152.0499°E	1887 opened as Dalrymple Creek Provisional School. 1890 became Dalrymple Creek State School. 1907 renamed Forest Plains State School. 1914 renamed Berat State School. Located at 405 Goomburra Road.
Bergen State School	Bergen	Toowoomba	1896	1969		
Berndale State School	Berndale via Evergreen	Toowoomba	1922	1956		
Black Swamp Provisional School	Blackswamp	Western Downs	circa 1912	circa 1914	26.5642°S 150.4966°E	Located on the northern corner of the junction of Blackswamp Road and Burns Road.
Bongeen State School	Bongeen	Toowoomba	1939	2005	27.5805°S 151.4450°E	Located at 7–15 Bongeen School Road, corner of Pipeline Road.
Bony Mountain State School	Bony Mountain	Southern Downs	1902	1972	28.1310°S 151.8340°E	Located in the northern part of 20 Bony Mountain Road.
Boodua State School	Boodua	Toowoomba	1908	1963	27.3745°S 151.8307°E	Originally known as East Lynne State School until 1926. Located at 5 Boodua West Road.
Boonarga State School	Boonarga	Western Downs	1893	1954	26.7909°S 150.7075°E	Formerly Hilltop State School. Located on the Warrego Highway.
Booroonby State School	near Cooranga locality, Queensland	Western Downs	1908	c.1921		Was located approximately 6.5 km from Cooranga towards Jimbour
Braeside State School	Beelbee	Western Downs	1915	1950	approx 27.11874°S 150.83298°E	On the eastern side of Beelbee Road.
Branch View State School	Branchview	Toowoomba	1931	1966		
Brigalow Park State School	Mount Darry	Toowoomba	1910	1962	27.1996°S 151.7793°E	Brigalow Park Provisional School opened on 17 October 1910. On 1 May 1912 it became Brigalow Park State School. It closed on 13 April 1962. It was located on Brigalow Park School Road.
Brighton Hills State School	via Kilcoy	Somerset	circa 1904	circa 1918		
Bringalily South State School	Bringalily	Toowoomba	1940	1967	28.10131°S 151.16309°E	Located on a 5-acre (2.0 ha) site at 309 Bringalily Creek Road.
Bringalily State School	Bringalily	Toowoomba	1934	1965	approx 28.01446°S 151.13376°E	Located on the southern side of Millwood Road.
Brownlea State School	Burncluith	Western Downs	1950	1952	26.5669°S 150.7068°E	Located on the north-east corner of Rennicks Road and G Tennyson Road.
Broxburn State School	Broxburn	Toowoomba	1898	1959	27.7323°S 151.6746°E	Located on the Pittsworth Felton Road, now just within the boundaries of Pittsworth.
Brymaroo State School	Brymaroo	Toowoomba	1913	1944	27.26459°S 151.62059°E	Opened 1913 as Rosalie Plains school, but renamed 1914 as Brymaroo school. It was on the western side of the Jondaryan Nungil Road.
Budgee State School	Budgee	Toowoomba	1913	1965	27.79556°S 152.01440°E	At 3 O'Rourke Road.
Bunjinie State School	Bunjinie (now Jimbour East)	Western Downs	1949	1958		Originally opened as Bunginie State School, with the minor spelling change happening during the first year.
Burncluith State School	Burncluith	Western Downs	1909	1962	26.6186°S 150.7116°E	Located in Burncluith School Road (now Burcluith Hall Road).
Burra Burri Provisional School	Burra Burri, Queensland		1916	1927		This was a different school to the current operating school by the name of Burra Burri State School. It was a half-time school with nearby Burra Burri Junction Provisional School (later known as Washpool Provisional School after it burnt down in 1923 and reopened soon after). When Burra Burri Provisional school closed in 1927, Washpool became a full-time State School and later in 1957 changed name to what is known today as Burra Burri State School and is still operating.
Burton State School	Biddleston	Tooowoomba	1900	1944	27.5494°S 151.7531°E	Located at 1840 Toowoomba Cecil Plains Road.
Bushgrove State School	Bushgrove now Cooranga	Western Downs	1938	1965		Located in Bushgrove School Road
Bymount State School	Bymount	Maranoa	1927	1947		
Cabawin State School	Cabawin (The Gums)	Western Downs	1934	1960	27.3644°S 150.2582°E	Located on the eastern side of on Cabawin South Road.
Cambey Provisional School	Cambey	Western Downs	1922	circa 1935	26.63184°S 150.48634°E	Located at 613 Cameby Road.
Canaga State School	Canaga	Western Downs	1911	1962	26.6753°S 150.9215°E	Located at 3258 Chinchilla Wondai Road.
Canning Creek State School	Canning Creek	Goondiwindi	1885	1922		The Canning Creek Provisional School opened on 15 November 1885 and became Canning Creek State School on 1 January 1909. The school closed on a number of occasions due to low student numbers. On 18 April 1922, it became a half-time school sharing the teacher with Glenside State School, with both schools closing on 20 June 1922.
Canning Vale State School	Canningvale	Southern Downs	1913	1965	28.24870°S 152.07459°E	Opened 1913 as Jew's Retreat State School, renamed 1936 Canning Vale State School. Located on a two-acre (0.81 ha) site at 453 Canningvale Road.
Cannon Creek State School	Cannon Creek (now Bapaume)	Southern Downs	1911	1945	28.5847°S 151.8634°E	Located at 611 Cannon Creek Road, now within the locality of Bapaume.
Captain's Mountain State School	Captains Mountain	Toowoomba	1922	1962		
Carlyle Provisional School	via Jandowae	Western Downs	c.1922	c.1925		Was a half-time school in conjunction with Wilga Downs Provisional School (Wilga Downs later became Jandowae East State School).
Cattle Creek State School	via Roma	Maranoa	1876	1922		In 1925, the school building was relocated to Jackson State School.
Cawdor State School	Cawdor	Toowoomba	1893	1951	27.4696°S 151.9191°E	Cawdor Provisional School opened in October 1893. It had become Cawdor State School by 1897. It closed in 1951. It was on a two-acre (0.81 ha) land parcel at 149 Cawdor Drive.
Cement Mills State School	Cement Mills	Goondiwindi	1913	1937		Gore State School opened on 20 January 1913. It was renamed Maxhill State School in 1927.
Cement Mills State School	Cement Mills	Goondiwindi	1937	1975		In 1937, the school building was relocated to the cement mills and renamed Cement Mills State School. The school closed on 21 February 1975. In the 1980s, at the request of residents, the Inglewood Shire Council bought the school building and relocated it for use it as a public hall. Its current location is on Cement Mills Road (28.3417°S 151.5051°E).
Chadford State School	Wallumbilla North	Maranoa	1908	1962	26.4919°S 149.2419°E	Located at 75 Old Chadford Road.
Charlton State School	Charlton	Toowoomba	1898	2013	27.5186°S 151.8475°E	Originally called Gowrie Estate Provisional/State, renamed Charlton State School in 1915. Located at 10834 Warrego Highway. The school's website has been archived.
Cheepie State School	Cheepie	Quilpie	1915	1974	26.6297°S 145.0142°E	Located in Blakeney Street.
Cherry Gully State School	Cherry Gully, now within Dalveen	Southern Downs	1900	circa 1916	28.43417°S 152.03293°E	Located on Old Stanthorpe Road, now within the locality of Dalveen.
Clintonvale State School	Clintonvale	Southern Downs	1907	2001	28.0956°S 152.1309°E	Was known as Ross's Corner until 1915, then as Clinton Vale, eventually Clintonvale State School. Located at 22 Clintonvale School Road. The school's website was archived.
Clontarf State School	Clontarf	Toowoomba	1913	1972	approx 27.97359°S 151.24628°E	Located on triangular land parcel on the eastern side of Clontarf Lavelle Road.
Coalbank State School	Coalbank	Toowoomba	1906	1961	approx 27.10867°S 151.86420°E	Located on the south-western corner of Coalbank Road and Schultz Road.
Cobba-da-mana State School	Cobba-da-mana (Coolmunda)	Goondiwindi	1912	1965		
Cockatoo State School	Cockatoo (now in Bungaban)	Western Downs	1984	2000	25.7901°S 150.2604°E	Cockatoo State School opened on 23 January 1984 and closed on 31 December 2000. It was located in the south of Cockatoo, now within neighbouring Bungaban at 1473 Ponty Pool Road.
Colamba Provisional School	Red Hill	Western Downs	1919	1939	approx 26.64884°S 150.70627°E	Located on Butts Road to the west of Branch Creek
Columboola State School	Columboola	Western Downs	1896	1978	26.6712°S 150.3406°E	Located at 25 Boort Koi Road.
Condamine Plains State School	Condamine Plains	Toowoomba	1947	1961	approx 27.7057°S 151.32812°E	Located on the Pampas Horrane Road.
Condamine Road State School	Miles	Western Downs	1908	1925	approx 26.7965°S 150.1599°E	Located on the western side of the Leichhardt Highway.
Cooladdi State School	Cooladdi	Murweh	1926	1974	26.6404°S 145.4638°E	Located opposite the railway station on Cooladdi Access Road.
Coolmunda Provisional School	Coolmunda	Goondiwindi	1883	1885		There were three different schools in Coolmunda at different times.
Coolmunda State School	Coolmunda	Goondiwindi	1910	1930		There were three different schools in Coolmunda at different times.
Coolmunda State School	Coolmunda	Goondiwindi	1932	1943		There were three different schools in Coolmunda at different times.
Cooper's Creek Provisional School	near Windorah	Barcoo	1897	1909		Operated from 1897 to 1903 as a half-time provisional school, sharing its teacher with Windorah State School. From 1903 to 1907 it became a full-time school, but from 1907 to 1909 it returned to being half-time, sharing the teacher with Windorah.
Cooranga North State School	Cooranga	Western Downs	1914	2003	26.7681°S 151.4074°E	Located at 14 Cooranga North Niagara Road.
Cooyar Creek Upper State School	Upper Cooyar Creek	Toowoomba	1924	1926		Cooyar Creek Upper Provisional School opened on 20 August 1924.
Cooyar Creek Upper State School	Upper Cooyar Creek	Toowoomba	1926	1940	26.9725°S 151.7374°E	It became Cooyar Creek State School on 1 August 1926 after being re-erected on a new site. It closed on 1 December 1940. It was at 1054 Cooyar Rangemore Road.
Cottonvale State School	Cottonvale	Southern Downs	1958	2004	28.5162°S 151.9477°E	Located at 11 Cottonvale School Road.
Cresley State School	Cresley (Cooranga)	Western Downs	1944	1961		Formerly Cooranga Creek Lower until 1950
Crosshill State School	Aubigny	Toowoomba	1880	1940	27.5093°S 151.6826°E	Located at 317 Ciesiolka Road.
Currandale Provisional School	via Jandowae	Western Downs	c.1916	c.1924		Was a half time school in conjunction with Wilga Downs Provisional School (Wilga Downs later became Jandowae East State School).
Cuttaburra Provisional School	Cuttaburra	Paroo	1899	circa 1906		
Daandine State School	Daandine (Ranges Bridge)	Western Downs	1953	1968		
Dalcouth State School	Dalcouth	Southern Downs	1908	1964	28.6499°S 151.9877°E	182 Gentle Road.
Danderoo State School	Danderoo	Southern Downs	1900	1964	28.25825°S 152.23308°E	On the western side of Yangan Killarney Road at the junction with Campbell Road.
Darr Creek State School	Darr Creek	Western Downs	1922	1961	26.5309°S 151.1352°E	6389 Chinchilla Wondai Road (formerly known as the Condamine Highway).
Daymar State School	Daymar	Balonne	1946	1983		
Deuchar State School	Deuchar (now in Massie)	Southern Downs	1904	1967	28.11510°S 151.94239°E	Located at 98 Millar Lane, on the south-east corner of Deuchar Bony Mountain Road, now within the neighbouring locality of Massie.
Devon Park State School	Devon Park	Toowoomba	1903	1963	27.37817°S 151.66996°E	Located on the southern side of Devon Park Road.
Djuan State School	Djuan	Toowoomba	1895	1969	27.18168°S 151.92303°E	Located on a 3-acre (1.2 ha) site on the bend of Djuan Road.
Doctor's Creek State School	Doctor Creek (now in Kilbirnie)	Southern Downs	1893	1964		
Dogwood State School	Dogwood (now in Columboola)	Western Downs	1925	1940	approx 26.73665°S 150.30460°E	Located immediately south of Columboola Creek and west of Freemans Road.
Domville State School	Domville	Toowoomba				
Douglas State School	Douglas	Toowoomba	1887	1959	27.3212°S 151.9106°E	From 1887 to 1911 called Gomoron Provisional/State School. Located at Douglas Plainby Road (corner Guy Road).
Duck Creek Provisional School	Toompine	Quilpie	1901	1905		
Ducklo State School	Ducklo	Western Downs	1915	1963	27.2415°S 151.0147°E	On a 5-acre (2.0 ha) site at 588 Ducklo School Road.
Dulacca North State School	Dulacca North, now Bogandilla	Western Downs	1919	1953	26.45424°S 149.79963°E	Located on the south-west corner of Dulacca North Road (previously North Dulacca School Road) and Frizzells Road.
Dulacca South State School	Dulacca South	Western Downs	1912	1947	26.77046°S 149.78679°E	Opened as Rainville State School in 1912, closed and reopened in 1925 as Dulucca South State School. It was on the north-eastern corner of Dulacca South Road and Butlers Extension Road.
East Felton State School	East Felton	Toowoomba	1921	1967	27.81674°S 151.75785°E	Located at 2981 Toowoomba Karara Road.
Edgefield State School	Irvingdale	Western Downs	1916	1924		
Edgefield State School	Irvingdale	Western Downs	1946	1960	27.13729°S 151.46848°E	Located at the northern end of Salt Well Road.
Ehlma State School	Brigalow	Western Downs	1913	1965	26.8928°S 150.8673°E	Located on Ehlma Boundary Road to the immediate north of the Ehlma railway station.
Elbow Valley State School	Elbow Valley	Southern Downs	1882	1946	28.3876°S 152.1287°E	Located on O'Deas Road.
Ellangowan State School	Ellangowan	Toowoomba	1885	1967	approx 27.93980°S 151.72664°E	School closed 1917–27 and 1952–58. Located on the Clifton Leyburn Road.
Elphinstone State School	Elphinstone	Toowoomba	1888	1963	27.97308°S 151.87121°E	Located at 519 Dungannon Road.
Emu Creek Upper Provisional School	Emu Vale	Southern Downs	1942	1960	approx 28.2114°S 152.3977°E	Located on the northern side of Emu Creek Road.. A plaque was placed at the school's location.
Emu Vale State School	Emu Vale	Southern Downs	1876	2003	28.2237°S 152.2479°E	Located on the triangular land parcel on the north-west corner of Yangan Killarney Road and Emu Creek Road. After closure, the school site was split into two sections with the western part becoming Emu Vale Park and the eastern part with the former school buildings now being used as holiday accommodation. The school's website was archived.
Eukey State School	Eukey	Southern Downs	1897	1964	approx 28.7743°S 151.9744°E	Previously called Paddock Swamp. Located on the eastern side of Eukey Road, just north-east of the public hall.
Euthulla School	Euthulla	Maranoa	circa 1889	circa 1931	26.43077°S 148.77560°E	Located on the western side of Emoh Ruo Road.
Evergreen State School	Evergreen	Toowoomba	1895	1996	27.1531°S 151.73813°E	Located at 3616 Oakey Cooyar Road.
Fairyland West State School	Durah	Western Downs	1941	1980	approx 26.4525°S 150.8886°E	Located on Fairyland School Road, just east of Charleys Creek.
Fairy Meadow Road State School	Greenswamp	Western Downs	1915	1919	approx 26.80917°S 150.41493°E	Located on the northern side of Greenswamp Road.
Felton South State School	Felton	Toowoomba	1929	1952	27.86990°S 151.72310°E	Located on the western side of the Toowoomba Karara Road.
Formartin State School	Formartin	Western Downs	1948	1988	27.3952°S 151.4090°E	1538 Jondaryan St Ruth Road.
Fortune's Crossing State School	Euthulla	Maranoa	1912	1928	26.42987°S 148.63562°E	Located off Orallo Road, immediately east of Bungeworgorai Creek.
Freestone Upper State School	Upper Freestone	Southern Downs	1874	1964		
Gladfield State School	Gladfield	Southern Downs	1887	1967	28.07655°S 152.18528°E	At 13 Gladfield Back Road. The school building was still extant on the site in October 2008.
Glenarbon State School	Beebo	Goondiwindi	1933	1982	28.6835°S 150.8910°E	Located just to the south of the Texas Yelarbon Road within the present-day boundaries of Beebo.
Glenaubyn State School	Glenaubyn	Western Downs	1915	1975	26.5052°S 149.9286°E	Located on the north-east corner of the junction of Glenaubyn Road and Dunns Road.
Glenaven State School	Glenaven	Toowoomba	1895	1934	27.1872°S 151.9808°E	Located on a 10-acre (4.0 ha) site at 160 Kluger Road (corner Djuan Road).
Glencoe State School	Glencoe	Toowoomba	circa 1882	circa 1941	27.4630°S 151.8540°E	Located at 62 Glencoe Yalangur Road.
Gleneden State School	Gleneden (southern Binjour)	Western Downs	1913	1953		
Glenlyon Provisional School	Glenlyon	Southern Downs	1899	1909		
Glenlyon State School	Glenlyon	Southern Downs	1933	1978		
Glenmorriston State School	via Jandowae	Western Downs	c.1921	c.1932		Was originally a half-time school in conjunction with Currandale Provisional School May have been known only as Glenmorriston Provisional School, not Glenmorriston State School.
Glenside State School	Canning Creek	Goondiwindi	1914	1922		Glenside Provisional School opened in 1914. On 1 December 1914, it became Glenside State School. On 18 April 1922, it was closed as a full-time school and reopened as a half time school in conjunction with Canning Creek State School. Due to the distance between the two schools they both closed on 20 June 1922.
Googa Googa Creek State School	Googa Creek	Toowoomba	1921	1950	approx 26.9550°S 152.0430°E	Located to the west of Googa Googa Creek within the present-day Googa State Forest.
Goombi State School	Goombi	Western Downs	1915	1964		
Goombie State School	Goombie Station (Quilpie)	Quilpie	1875	1977	26.1126°S 144.1348°E	Goombie Station is in the north of the locality of Quilpie.
Goomburra State School	Goomburra	Southern Downs	1881	1925		
Goomburra Township State School	Goomburra	Southern Downs	1904	1972	28.04244°S 152.12053°E	At 17 Inverramsay Road. Burned down, a plaque and signage mark the site.
Goondiwindi East State School	Goondiwindi East	Goondiwindi	1898	1947		
Goranba State School	Goranba	Western Downs	1925	1929		Goranba Provisional School opened February 1925 in a newly constructed hall.
Goranba State School	Goranba	Western Downs	1929	1941	27.2547°S 150.6044°E	In July 1929 it was decided to combine the schools at Perthton and Goranba in single location. In December 1929, the school building at Perthton was relocated to Goranba to establish Goranba State School on a new five-acre (2.0 ha) site. It was located 3.6 kilometres (2.2 mi) north of the Goranba railway station on the north-east corner of Goranba Lane and Crosbies Road. It closed circa 1941.
Gowrie Little Plain State School	Gowrie Little Plain	Toowoomba	1890	1965	approx 27.4285°S 151.8517°E	Located at approx 125 Gowrie Little Plain Road.
Gowrie Mountain State School	Gowrie Mountain (now in Kingsthorpe)	Toowoomba	1901	1967	27.5072°S 151.8026°E	Located at 95 Gowrie Mountain School Road, Kingsthorpe.
Gowrie Road State School	Gowrie Junction	Toowoomba	1874	1936		
Greenup State School	Greenup	Goondiwindi	1955	1976		
Greenwood State School	Greenwood	Toowoomba	1907	1968	27.3379°S 151.7293°E	At 1091 Oakey Cooyar Road (corner of Greenwood School Road).
Greymare State School	Greymare	Southern Downs	1879	1966	28.19914°S 151.75539°E	Toolburra South State School opened on 2 June 1879. In 1924 it was renamed Greymare State School. It closed in 1966. It was at 5 Lagoon Creek Road opposite Graymare School Road.
Groomsville State School	Groomsville	Toowoomba	1906	1951	27.31475°S 151.96649°E	Originally known as Jericho Estate Provisional School until 1908. Located on a two-acre (0.81 ha) site at 845 Pechey Maclagan Road .
Gunnewin West State School	Gunnewin	Maranoa	1928	1945		
Gunyan Provisional School	Silver Spur	Goondiwindi	1933	1939		The Gunyan pastoral station and Mount Gunyan are now in Silver Spur.
Gurulmundi State School	Gurulmundi	Western Downs	1928	1965	approx 26.42691°S 150.05515°E	Located on the western side of Gurulmundi Road.
Hampstead Provisional School	Walhallow	Maranoa	1920	1930		Originally known as Freeman's Waterhole Provisional School. Was renamed in 1923. Hampstead is a pastoral property east of Mitchell now in Walhallow.
Hampton State School	Hampton	Toowoomba	1938	1959		
Harelmar State School		Toowoomba	1878	1962	27.6582°S 151.7238°E	Previously Eton Vale State School and Umbirom State School. Located at 29 Old School Lane, off Harelmar Road.
Harrow State School	Southbrook	Toowoomba	1909	1927	approx 27.6953°S 151.7774°E	Located on the western corner of Umbiram Banchory Road and Cambooya Felton Road.
Haslemere State School						
Haystack State School	Tuckerang	Western Downs	1910	after 1921	26.8215°S 150.9182°E	Opened as Daiwan State School in 1910. May have also been known as Haystack Plains State School. In 1924, it was renamed Haystack State School. In 1921, it was on the south-west corner of Haystack Noola Road and Haystack North Road in Tuckerang.
Haystack State School	Warra	Western Downs	before 1938	1968	26.8471°S 150.9146°E	In 1938, it was at 1054 Haystack Road in Warra.
Headington Hill State School	Headington Hill	Toowoomba	1912	1967	27.90533°S 152.00231°E	Known as McGovern's Hill State School until end of 1912. Located on the south-east corner of Gatton Clifton Road and McGovern Road.
Hendon State School	Hendon	Southern Downs	1882	1954		
Highland Plains State School	Highland Plains	Toowoomba	1918	circa 1945	27.28550°S 151.78319°E	Located at 622 Highland Plain Road.
Hirstglen State School	Hirstglen	Toowoomba	1930	1948	approx 27.82772°S 152.10382°E	Located on the southern side of Hirstglen Road.
Hirstvale State School	near Budgee	Toowoomba	circa 1910	circa 1917		Operated briefly as a half-time school in conjunction with Budgee Provisional School, so must have been nearby.
Hodgson State School	Hodgson	Maranoa	1877	1964		
Hodgson's Vale State School	Hodgson Vale	Toowoomba	1906	1960	27.66479°S 151.94882°E	Located at 161 Hodgson Vale Road.
Hookswood State School	Hookswood	Western Downs	1914	1926	26.53817°S 150.25779°E	Located on Hookswood Pelham Road.
Hopeland State School	Hopeland	Western Downs	1937	2006	26.8502°S 150.6679°E	Located at 821 Chinchilla-Kogan Road (corner of Hopeland School Road). The school's website was archived.
Horseshoe Lagoon State School	Yingerbay (now in Euthulla)	Maranoa	1917	1937		Horseshoe Lagoon State School was at Yingerbay near Roma (now Euthalla).
Hungerford State School	Hungerford	Bulloo	1892	1930	28.9934°S 144.4107°E	Located on a five-acre (2.0 ha) site bounded by Arcturus Street, Achernar Street, Aldebran Street and Canopus Street.
Hungerford State School	Hungerford	Bulloo	1981	1981		Located in Bulloo Shire Hall
Hunterton School	Hunterton (Orallo)	Maranoa	1927	1938		Hunterton was a former railway station in Orallo.
Inglewood West State School	Inglewood	Goondiwindi	1904	1928		
Inverai State School	Tuckerang	Western Downs	1908	1960	26.7717°S 150.9451°E	Located on the north-western corner of Inverai Road and Warra Canaga Creek Road.
Inverleigh State School	Rosenthal Heights	Southern Downs	1921	1942	28.24801°S 151.98185°E	Located on a five-acre (2.0 ha) site at 508 Lyndhurst Lane (north-east corner of Inverleigh Road).
Inverramsay State School	Inverramsay (Goomburra)	Southern Downs	1914	1965	28.01056°S 152.22941°E	Inverramsay is in the east of Goomburra The school was at 1194 Inverramsay Road.
Irvingdale State School	Irvingdale	Toowoomba	1909	1946	approx 27.19926°S 151.50282°E	Irvingdale Provisional School opened on 22 April 1880 as a half-time provisional school in conjunction with Rosalie Plains Provisional School (meaning the two schools shared a single teacher) until it closed on 6 May 1881. On 2 November 1881, it reopened as a full-time provisional school. On 1 January 1909, it became Irvingdale State School. It closed on 31 December 1946. It was at approx 23 Irvingdale Post Office Road.
Irongate State School	Irongate	Toowoomba	1910	1963	27.6269°S 151.5167°E	Located at 941 Irongate Road (junction with Mondam Road).
Jackson State School	Jackson	Maranoa	1892	1983		
Jandowae East State School	Jandowae	Western Downs	1916	1964	26.77836°S 151.20779°E	Opened 1916 as Wilga Downs Provisional School. Renamed 1923 as Jandowae East Provisional School. Became Jandowae East State School in 1955. It closed in 1964. Located on the western corner of Jandowae East Road and Skinners Road. Was originally a half-time school in conjunction with Currandale Provisional School, then later in conjunction with Carlyle Provisional School.
Jingarry State School	Junabee	Southern Downs	1919	1963	28.2370°S 152.1717°E	Jingarry State School opened on 4 August 1919. It closed on 24 January 1960. It was at 439 Jingarry Mount Sturt Road.
Jinghi Lower State School	Jinghi	Western Downs	1916	1960	26.7459°S 151.0523°E	Located on Lower Jinghi School Road.
Jinghi Valley State School	Jinghi	Western Downs	1915	1967	26.6831°S 151.1642°E	Was known as Jinghi Gully State School until 1952. Located on the southern corner of Jinghi Gully Road and Grundys Road (26.6831°S 151.1642°E).
Jones Gully State School	Jones Gully	Toowoomba	1902	1955	27.1747°S 152.0112°E	Located on the south-eastern corner of Jones Gully Road and Tigell Road.
Jubilee Vale State School	Emu Creek	Toowoomba	1913	1951	27.09311°S 151.97882°E	Located on a two-acre (0.81 ha) site at 37 Maddern Road.
Junabee State School	Junabee	Southern Downs	1904	1963		
Karaweena Provisional School	near Cooranga locality, Queensland	Western Downs	c.1921	1926		Was located towards Jandowae from Cooranga. The building was moved from the closed Booroonby State School by horse and dray.
Kelvinhaugh State School	Kelvinhaugh	Toowoomba	1905	1952	27.4013°S 151.7680°E	Mayburn Provisional School opened on 20 January 1905. On 1 January 1909 it became Mayburn State School. On 30 July 1926 it was renamed Kelvinhaugh State School. It closed on 30 October 1952. It was at 133 Wilthorn Kelvinhaugh Road .
Kilbirnie State School	Kilbirnie	Toowoomba	1899	1961	27.2229°S 151.8293°E	Mount Darry Provisional School opened on 28 August 1899. On 1 January 1909 it became Mount Darry State School. In 1915 it was renamed Zahley State School and in 1925 it was renamed Kilbirnie State School. It closed on 31 December 1961. It was located at 752 Goombungee Kilburnie Road.
Kincora State School	Kincora	Toowoomba	1883	1963	27.8132°S 151.5584°E	On a two-acre (0.81 ha) site on the north-west corner of Janz Road (shown as Keene Road on some maps) and School Road.
King's Creek State School	Kings Creek	Toowoomba	1884	1931	approx 27.89070°S 151.90825°E	On the eastern side of Felton Clifton Road and South Western railway.
King's Tent Provisional School	Rangemore, Queensland		1899	1917		For a short time it was a half-time school in conjunction with nearby Rangemore State School
Kioma State School	via Toobeah	Goondiwindi	1959	2009		
Kleinton State School	Kleinton	Toowoomba	1911	1970	27.4249°S 151.9453°E	At 90 Kleinton School Road. In 1975, the Amaroo Environmental Education Centre opened in the former school building.
Komine School	Komine (now in Gunnewin)	Maranoa	1920	1936		Formerly Barramundi Tent School until 1924. Komine is an unbounded locality at 25.9163°S 148.55°E.
Koondai Creek State School	Koondai-I (now in Bell)	Western Downs	1912	1958		
Kooralgin State School	Kooralgin	Toowoomba	1916	1963	26.93095°S 151.94969°E	Located at 867 Yarraman Kooralgin Road.
Kooroongarra South State School	Kooroongarra	Toowoomba	1891	1967	28.0995°S 151.2557°E	Located at approx 2325 Kooroongarra Road.
Kragra State School	Kragra	Western Downs	1955	1974		
Kupunn State School	Kupunn (now in Ducklo)	Western Downs	1913	1963	27.22292°S 151.11776°E	Located on a 5-acre (2.0 ha) site at 408 Kupunn Road.
Kurumbul State School	Kurumbul	Goondiwindi	1912	1976		Originally known as Burranba State School.
Lagoon Flat State School	Watsons Crossing	Goondiwindi	1894	1926	29.0919°S 151.2889°E	On the eastern side of Riverton Road.
Langlands State School	Langlands	Western Downs	1922	1962		
Lavelle State School	Lavelle	Toowoomba	1926	1957	approx 27.9880°S 151.2834°E	Located on Kooroongarra Road.
Lillingstone State School	near Kaimkillenbun	Western Downs	1925	1934		Lillingstone State School opened on 27 January 1925 and closed on 31 March 1934.
Limevale State School	Limevale	Goondiwindi	1906	1963		
Linthorpe State School	Linthorpe	Toowoomba	1900	1960	27.6038°S 151.6298°E	Was known as Motley Provisional School from 1900 to 1901. Located at 1190 Stoneleigh Road.
Llanberris Provisional School	Warra	Western Downs	1919	1923		Llanberris Provisional School opened on 17 November 1919 and closed on 27 April 1923.
Loch Lomond State School	Loch Lomond	Southern Downs	1903	1976	28.3166°S 152.2017°E	Located on the southern corner of Warwick Killarney Road and Mckee Road.
Lyra State School	Lyra	Southern Downs	1929	1966	approx 28.82985°S 151.85429°E	Located on the western side of the New England Highway, opposite the railway station.
Macalister State School	Macalister	Western Downs	1894	1973	27.0462°S 151.0790°E	Located on the Warrego Highway.
Maclagan North State School	North Maclagan	Toowoomba	1922	1962		
Maclagan State School	Maclagan	Toowoomba	1904	1962		
Mahen State School	near Cooranga locality, Queensland	Western Downs	4 June 1935	30 June 1948		Originally opened as Newlands Provisional School. Name changed to Mahen Provisional School 15 June 1937, then became Mahen State School in 1944.
Malling State School	Malling	Western Downs	1917	1971		Originally opened as Box Gully State School. Changed name to Malling State School in 1917.
Malta Provisional School	Caldervale, Queensland		1881	1883		
Mangalore State School	Mangalore (now Bakers Bend)	Murweh	1968	1974		
Manapouri State School	Manapouri	Toowoomba	1923	1952	27.84724°S 152.00308°E	Opened as Manipouri State School with the spelling changed to Manapouri circa 1930. On a two-acre (0.81 ha) site at 401 Carey Road.
Melrose State School	via Killarney	Southern Downs	1910	c.1960?		Melrose Station is a pastoral property approx 5 km west of Killarney town centre. The school was officially opened on Tuesday 18 October 1910.
Millingwood Provisional School	Millingwood (in Darr Creek)	Western Downs	1937	1952	approx 26.5376°S 151.1759°E	Located on Millingwood Road.
Millwood State School	Millwood	Toowoomba	1944	1965		
Milo Provisional School	Milo Station (now in Adavale)	Quilpie	1888 & c. 1902	1891 & c. 1905		Opened initially as Milo Station Provisional School but closed circa 1891. It reopened circa 1902 as Milo Provisional School and closed circa 1905. Milo Station is now within the locality of Adavale.
Mocatta's Corner State School	Dalby (on the boundary with Irvingdale)	Western Downs	circa 1887	1925	27.11677°S 151.36232°E	Located on the south-west corner of the junction of Dalby Cooyar Road and Mocattas Corner Road.
Monmouth State School	Chinchilla	Western Downs	1904	circa 1946	26.7165°S 150.6593°E	Located at 33 Hunter Road off Monmouth Bridge Road.
Mooga State School	Mooga (now Euthulla)	Maranoa	1904	1937	26.36873°S 148.81698°E	Located on the northern side of Mountainview Road, within the present-day locality of neighbouring Euthulla.
Moola State School	Moola	Western Downs	1904	1967	approx 27.0981°S 151.5332°E	Located north-east of the intersection of Moola School Road and Bowenville Moola Road.
Motley State School	Motley	Toowoomba	1922	1936	approx 27.54941°S 151.61430°E	Located south-east of the Motley railway station.
Mount Abundance State School	Mount Abundance	Maranoa	1951	1985		
Mount Colliery State School	Mount Colliery	Southern Downs	1915	1967–1968	28.2863°S 152.2846°E	Originally called Tannymorel Colliery State School. Located at 21 Roach Street.
Mount Emlyn State School	Mount Emlyn	Toowoomba	1920	1957		
Mount Gordon State School	Warwick	Southern Downs	1913	1985	28.2144°S 151.9963°E	Lyndhurst State School opened in January 1913, but was renamed Mount Gordon State School. It closed in 1985. The school was located on a 5-acre (2.0 ha) site at 294–304 Wood Street (corner of Parker Street, 28.2144°S 151.9963°E).
Mount Kent State School	Mount Kent (now in Felton)	Toowoomba	1883	1959	27.8446°S 151.8292°E	Although Mount Kent is within Nobby, the school was located on Ted Mengel Road just across the boundary of present-day Felton.
Mount Mahen Provisional School	near Cooranga locality, Queensland	Western Downs	22 July 1925	11 February 1930		This school closed briefly approx. February 1929, reopening 11 June 1929. The building burned down in the 1930s.
Mount Marshall State School	Mount Marshall	Southern Downs	1923	1965	28.0815°S 152.0394°E	Located on the south-western corner of Hendon Mount Marshall Road and the New England Highway.
Mount Sibley State School	Mount Sibley (now Ascot)	Toowoomba	1905	1953		
Mount Tully State School	Mount Tully	Southern Downs	1921	circa 1943	approx 28.71448°S 151.95737°E	Located on the eastern side of Mount Tully Road.
Mountain View State School	Mountain View (now in eastern Killarney)	Southern Downs	1895	1965	28.3523°S 152.3238°E	Located at 11 Mountain View Road, Killarney.
Mountside State School	via Dalveen	Southern Downs	circa 1888	1921		
Muckadilla State School	Muckadilla	Maranoa	1886	2009	26.5908°S 148.3855°E	Located on a five-acre (2.0 ha) site at the southern end of Centenary Drive. The school's website was archived.
Muldu State School	Muldu	Toowoomba	1917	1966	27.26910°S 151.68733°E	Located on a three-acre (1.2 ha) site at 123 Muldu Plainview Road.
Mulga State School	Brigalow	Western Downs	1896	1943	26.8747°S 150.8044°E	Located on a L-shaped land parcel on the kink in Jones Road.
Mungindi State School	Mungindi	Balonne	1894	1968	28.9722°S 148.9874°E	Located at 92–100 Barwon Street. Note that there was also a school in Mungindi on the New South Wales side of the border.
Muniganeen State School	Muniganeen	Toowoomba	1904	1950	27.37422°S 151.86996°E	Located on a three-acre (1.2 ha) site at 74 Muniganeen Road on the north-western corner with Boodua Muniganeen Road.
Myall Park State School	Myall Park	Western Downs	1922	circa 1942	26.58067°S 150.18059°E	Located on the western side of Myall Park Road (formerly Miles Retreat Road).
Myra State School	Myra (now in Tara)	Western Downs	1944	1945	27.22472°S 150.52411°E	In March 1943, the Goranba school building was relocated to Warra-Kogan Road near the Myra Meadows property on a site donated by Andrew Watt Adams. The relocated school building was opened as Myra State School in 1944 but closed on 2 February 1945. It was a 10-acre (4.0 ha) site on the eastern side of Tara Kogan Road in the present-day locality of Tara. It should not be confused with an earlier Myra Provisional School which was renamed Perthton Provisional School.
Nangwee State School	Nangwee	Toowoomba	1921	1961	27.5440°S 151.2852°E	Located at 69 McPherson Road.
Narko State School	Narko	Toowoomba	1908	1937	27.11340°S 151.71125°E	Cockatoo Creek Provisional School opened on 1 July 1908 under head teacher Edward Laurence Stinson. On 1 January 1909, it became Cockatoo Creek State School. In 1913, it was renamed Narko State School. It closed on 11 July 1937. The school was on a five-acre (2.0 ha) site at 468 Peranga Narko Road.
Nellibri State School	Noorindoo, Queensland		c.1899	1906		Nellibri was a pastoral station
Nevilton State School	Nevilton	Toowoomba	1903	1958	27.88505°S 151.97158°E	Opened 1903 as Headington Hill Provisional (later State) School. Renamed 1910 Nevilton State School. At 15785 New England Highway. A roadside sign indicates the site.
Nindi Gully State School	Nindigully	Balonne	1922	1941		
Noonga State School	Jackson North	Maranoa	1947	1968	26.4736°S 149.6340°E	Noonga State School was located on the Noonga pastoral station west of the Jackson Wandoan Road and immediately west of Noonga Creek.
North Branch State School	North Branch	Toowoomba	circa 1878	1903		The first North Branch State School opened circa 1878 at the North Branch homestead. It was 26 by 18 feet (7.9 by 5.5 m). It closed in 1903.
North Branch State School	North Branch	Toowoomba	1926	1958	27.8045°S 151.6302°E	The second North Branch State School was located at 55 Kincora Road.
Northern Road State School	Orange Hill	Maranoa	circa 1891	circa 1939	26.50648°S 148.78819°E	In May 1888, local residents met with the intention to establish a school in the Northern Road area. Northern Road Provisional School had opened by November 1891. It later become Northern Road State School. The school closed some time after November 1939. It was at 777 Carnarvon Highway. In 1951, the school building was to be relocated to Mount Abundance.
Norwin State School	Norwin	Toowoomba	1924	1996	27.5437°S 151.3845°E	Located at 5814 Toowoomba Cecil Plains Road (directly opposite Ziesemer Kummerow Road).
Nudley State School	Nudley (now in south-west of Fairyland)	Western Downs	1913	1956	26.5351°S 150.8525°E	Located on Nudley School Road.
Nungil State School	Nungil (now in Brymaroo)	Toowoomba	1904	1949	27.19506°S 151.61570°E	Located on a two-acre (0.81 ha) site on Pechey-Maclagan Road.
Nunkulla State School	Felton	Toowoomba	1912	1959	27.77930°S 151.78772°E	Located at 34 Nunkulla Road.
Nutgrove State School	Nutgrove	Toowoomba	1923	1947		
Oman Ama State School	Oman Ama	Goondiwindi	1896	1935		Opened as Brigalow Provisional School until it was renamed Oman-Ama State School in 1913.
Orallo School	Orallo	Maranoa	1918	1927	approx 26.26951°S 148.54150°E	A school for Orallo was proposed in 1917. Orallo Provisional School opened circa 1918. The building was expanded in 1919. On 1 October 1922, it became Orallo State School on a 1.5-acre (0.61 ha) reserve. It closed in 1927. It was on the south-western side of Orallo Road.
Palm Tree State School	Palmtree	Toowoomba	1901	1960	27.40740°S 152.14426°E	Located on the eastern side of Palmtree School Road.
Pampas State School	Pampas	Toowoomba	1897	1957	27.7912°S 151.4141°E	Opened as Dry Paddock Provisional School, becoming Pampas State School in 1909. Located at 22 Fysh Road.
Pechey State School	Pechey	Toowoomba	1889	1959		
Pelican State School	Pelican	Western Downs	1908	1986	26.6037°S 150.8684°E	Located on Burra Burri Creek Road.
Peranga State School	Peranga	Toowoomba	1915	1973		
Perthton Provisional School	Goranba	Western Downs	1911	1929	approx 27.28776°S 150.56026°E	Myra Provisional School opened in 1911 and was operated as a part-time school (meaning it shared a single teacher with some other part-time schools in the district). In 1913, it became a full-time school and was renamed Perthton Provisional School. It was located to the north-west of the Perthton railway station . It was on a two-acre (0.81 ha) site the north-west of the Perthton railway station. It closed circa 1929, when the new Goranga State School was established with the Perthton school building relocated to that new site.
Pickenjennie School	Pickanjinnie	Maranoa	1896	1927		Formerly Poybah School
Pierce Creek State School	Pierces Creek	Toowoomba	1908	1959	approx 27.1900°S 152.0631°E	Virginia Provisional School opened on 12 October 1908 and became Virginia State School in 1909. In 1918, it was renamed Pierce Creek State School. It closed on 18 October 1959. It was on the western side of Pierces Creek Road south of the junction with Middle Road.
Pilton Upper State School	Upper Pilton	Toowoomba	1908	1963	approx 27.91301°S 152.11136°E	Located on the eastern side of Pilton Valley Road.
Pinelands State School	Pinelands	Toowoomba	1904	1960	27.2417°S 152.0104°E	Located at 6778 New England Highway.
Pinelands Upper State School	Upper Pinelands	Toowoomba	circa 1922	circa 1946	27.2315°S 151.9701°E	Located at 57 Roberts Road (corner of Butters Lane).
Pirrinuan State School	Pirrinuan	Western Downs	1911	1932	approx 27.04585°S 151.28012°E	Located on Dead Horse Lane.
Pirrinuan State School	Pirrinuan	Western Downs	1937	circa 1963	approx 27.0305°S 151.2372°E	Located on Dalby Jandowae Road to the immediate north-east of the Pirrinuan railway station.
Plainby State School	Plainby	Toowoomba	1889	1959	27.27102°S 151.95258°E	Located on a two-acre-two-rood (1.0 ha) site at 772 Plainby Road.
Porters Gap State School	near Cooranga locality, Queensland	Western Downs	22 May 1933	31 December 1939		
Pratten State School	Pratten	Southern Downs	1876	1965		
Punch's Creek Provisional School	Punchs Creek	Toowoomba	1897	1901		
Rangemore State School	Rangemore, Queensland		1913	1962		For a short time it was a half-time school in conjunction with nearby King's Tent Provisional School
Raslie State School	Wallumbilla North	Maranoa	1911	1963	26.4805°S 149.1268°E	Formerly known as North Wallumbilla Creek State School and Rasley State School, it was located on Raslie Road.
Retreat Provisional School	Warkon, Queensland		c.1896	1906		Was a half time school in conjunction with Nellibri State School from 1899 to 1905
Rockfield State School	Nobby	Toowoomba	1905	1928	27.8387°S 151.8758°E	Located at 349 Mount Kent Boundary Road (corner Denton Road).
Rocky Hill State School	near Yarraman, Queensland	Toowoomba	1924	1963		Located between Nanango and Yarraman, near Rocky Creek
Rosebank State School	Red Hill	Western Downs	1909	circa 1915	approx 26.7301°S 151.3820°E	Located on the western side at the bend in Holmes Road.
Riversdale State School	Chinchilla	Western Downs	1902	1915	approx 26.73005°S 151.38202°E	Located at the south-western end of Windmill Road. Not to be confused with the Riversdale State School near Tully.
Rocky Creek State School	Rocky Creek	Toowoomba	1903	1972	approx 28.00697°S 151.35026°E	On the western side of Rocky Creek Road.
Rocky Mountain Provisional School	Emu Vale	Southern Downs	1919	circa 1920	approx 28.2080°S 152.3658°E	Located on Emu Creek Road.
Roma Junior School	Roma	Maranoa	1964	2005		Became campus of Roma State College
Roma Middle School	Roma	Maranoa	1987	2005		Became campus of Roma State College
Roma Senior State High School	Roma	Maranoa	1920	1986		Became Roma Middle School
Roma Special School	Roma	Maranoa	1982	1995		
Roma State School	Roma	Maranoa	1870	1986		Split between Roma Junior and Roma Middle
Rookwood State School	Palgrave	Southern Downs	circa 1888	1929	approx 28.27374°S 151.84877°E	Located in a bend of Sandy Creek near the Rookwood (also written as Rook Wood) pastoral station. This area has changed considerably due to the subsequent construction of Leslie Dam.
Rosalie Plains State School	Rosalie Plains (now in Brymaroo)	Toowoomba	1907	circa 1944	27.20427°S 151.66179°E	Opened 1907 as Ashlea school, renamed 1916 Rosalie Plains School. It was on the eastern side of Old Rosalie School Road. Despite the name, the school was in the present-day locality of Brymaroo.
Rosehill (also Rose Hill) State School	Rosehill	Southern Downs	circa 1890	1966	28.18265°S 151.98865°E	Located on the northern side of Warwick Allora Road.
Rossvale State School	Rossvale	Toowoomba	1899	1985	27.6298°S 151.5730°E	Located at 48 Rossvale Road West. The building has been relocated to Pittsworth State High School where it is now the music block.
Russellvale State School	Moola, Queensland		1930	1960	27.0040°S 151.5235°E	It was at 989 Bunya Mountains Road (corner of Russelvale Road)
Ryeford State School	Ryeford	Toowoomba	1937	2016	27.9398°S 151.8134°E	Located at 968 Clifton Leyburn Road. The school's website was archived.
Rywung State School	Rywung	Western Downs	1944	1968	26.6840°S 150.4727°E	Located on C Kerrs Road near the Warrego Highway north of the Rywung railway station.
Sabine State School	Sabine (now in Devon Park)	Toowoomba Region	1925	circa 1937	27.33998°S 151.68627°E	Located at 210 Acland Sabine Road, now within the present-day locality of Devon Park.
Silverleigh State School	Silverleigh	Toowoomba	1902	1967	27.3172°S 151.7622°E	Local residents requested a school in 1901. Tenders were called to construct the school in May 1902. Boah Peak Provisional School opened circa September 1902, being renamed Silverleigh Provisional School in 1904. On 1 January 1909 it became Silverleigh State School. It closed on 4 June 1967. It was at 836 Acland Silverleigh Road.
Six Mile Camping Reserve State School	Bungil	Maranoa	1900	1925	26.63471°S 148.82546°E	Located on the north-eastern corner of 538 Six Mile Road.
Sladevale State School	Sladevale	Southern Downs	1899	1967	28.16595°S 152.07166°E	Opened 1899 as Campbell's Plains State School, renamed 1903 Sladevale State School. The school closed in 1932 but reopened in 1944. It closed permanently in 1967. Located at 12739 Cunningham Highway.
Somme State School	Somme	Southern Downs	circa 1917	1927	28.7612°S 151.8122°E	There were two Somme State Schools at different time periods. Located at the south-west corner of the junction of Somme Lane and an unnamed street.
Somme State School	Somme	Southern Downs	1949	1962		There were two Somme State Schools at different time periods. The later school is also located near Somme Lane, so possibly it is the same school but the available map does not pinpoint its location precisely enough to be certain.
Southbrook State School	Southbrook	Toowoomba	1882	1948	27.7107°S 151.7317°E	Located on Jimna Springs Road.
Southbrook Central State School						
Spring Creek State School	Spring Creek	Toowoomba Southern Downs	1871	1954	27.9520°S 151.9920°E	Located at 616 Spring Creek Road.
Spring Creek Upper State School	Spring Creek	Toowoomba Southern Downs	1915	1970	27.96134°S 152.03890°E	Located at 318 Doyle Road.
Spring Flat State School	Jimbour East	Western Downs	1893	1929	approx 26.89039°S 151.36092°E	Located on the western side of Spring Flat Road.
Springside State School	Springside	Toowoomba	1888	1954		Located at 28 Tews Road (27.66823°S 151.58860°E).
Springvale State School	Springvale	Western Downs	1954	1965	27.35524°S 151.20568°E	Located on a 10-acre (4.0 ha) site on the south-western corner of Hennings Connection Road and Grassdale Road.
Squaretop State School	Kaimkillenbun	Western Downs	1919	1959	27.0152°S 151.44586°E	Located on Squaretop Road just west of Bell Kaimkillenbun Road.
Strathane State School	near Ellangowan	Toowoomba	1898	1927		
St Ruth Provisional School	near Formartin	Western Downs	c.1888	1920		In 1918, it became a half-time school in conjunction with West Prairie Provisional School (meaning the schools shared a single teacher). In 1919, it returned to full-time school status.
Sugarloaf State School	Sugarloaf	Southern Downs	1874	1939	28.6927°S 152.0218°E	Located at 1061 Sugarloaf Road.
Sundown Provisional School	Woleebee	Western Downs	1931	1937		Located on Sundown Road. The school opened 2 March 1931 and closed 1 February 1937, due to low enrolment numbers.
Sunnyvale State School	Bunya Mountains south-west slopes, near Moola	Western Downs	1911	1958	26.88584°S 151.46702°E	Located on a 5-acre (2.0 ha) site on the eastern corner of Sunnyvale Road and Blancks Road.
Swan Creek State School	Swan Creek	Southern Downs	1870	1997	28.1974°S 152.1382°E	Opened 1870 as Swan Creek Lower State School, circa 1887 renamed Swan Creek State School. Located at 106 Swan Creek School Road.
Swanfels State School	Swanfels	Southern Downs	1892	1980	28.1756°S 152.2663°E	Swanfels Provisional School opened on 18 January 1892. In 1894 it became Swanfels State School. It closed on 12 December 1980. It was at 509 Top Swanfels Road.
Table Top State School (near Allora)	Spring Creek	Southern Downs	1952	1962		Tabletop parish is now in Spring Creek.
Talgai West State School	Talgai	Southern Downs	1902	1963	28.04236°S 151.88648°E	Located on the south-eastern side of Dalrymple Creek Road.
Tangkam State School	Tangkam (now in north Aubigny)	Toowoomba	1918	1961		
Tannymorel State School	Tannymorel	Southern Downs	1877	2017	28.2950°S 152.2488°E	Previously known as Farm Creek Provisional/State School. Located at 2 Oak Street. The school's website was archived.
Thane State School	Thane	Southern Downs	1905	1925		
Thane's Creek State School	Thanes Creek	Southern Downs	1892	1965	28.10790°S 151.67915°E	Located on a 5-acre (2.0 ha) site at 15 Bush Cottage Lane.
The Falls State School	The Falls	Southern Downs	1948	1974		Formerly Ferndale SS until 1953
Thorndale State School	Thorndale	Southern Downs	1946	1964		
Thornville State School	Thornville	Toowoomba	1909	1975	27.0597°S 151.8392°E	At 3847 New England Highway.
Tipton State School	Tipton	Toowoomba	1884	1948	approx 27.43077°S 151.25720°E	On a 5-acre (2.0 ha) site on the western side of Dalby Cecil Plains Road .
Toobeah State School	Toobeah	Goondiwindi	1914	1964	approx 28.41471°S 149.87191°E	On the northern corner of the Barwon Highway and Minnel Road.
Toompine Provisional School	Toompine	Quilpie	1900	1902		
Toowoomba South Boys State School	South Toowoomba	Toowoomba	1865	1983		
Toowoomba South State School	South Toowoomba	Toowoomba	1865	2013	27.5697°S 151.9526°E	Located at 158 James Street and listed on the Queensland Heritage Register. The school's website was archived.
Toowoomba Special School	Centenary Heights	Toowoomba	1960	1997	27.5780°S 151.9644°E	Opened as Toowoomba Opportunity School. Located at 58 Ramsay Street. After closing, it became the second campus of Clifford Park Special School.
Top Camp State School	Top Camp	Toowoomba	1947	1960		
Tummaville State School	Tummaville	Toowoomba	1880	1962	27.86930°S 151.42009°E	Located on a 2-acre (0.81 ha) site on the southern side of Missen Road.
Turallin State School	Turallin	Toowoomba	1888	1960	27.8290°S 151.2057°E	Opened as Pine Creek Provisional School in 1888, becoming Turallin Provisional School in 1904. It was at 606 Turallin Road.
Ulimaroa State School	Ulimaroa (now in Drillham)	Western Downs	1949	1967		
Umbiram State School	Umbiram	Toowoomba	1908	1975	27.66082°S 151.77171°E	Opened as Flemington Provisional School opened on 18 May 1908. On 1 January 1909, it became Flemington State School. It closed in 1914, but reopened in 1915. In 1918, it was renamed Umbiram State School. It closed on 12 December 1975. It was at 366 Umbiram School Road.
Unity Provisional School	Goombi / Rywung	Western Downs	1922	1931	26.7256°S 150.4556°E	Located on the south-western corner of Lees Road and B Kerrs Road on the present-day boundary between Goombi and Rywung.
Walker's Creek State School	Walkers Creek (now in Bunya Mountains)	Western Downs	1919	1958	approx 26.8494°S 151.4550°E	Walkers Creek rises in the Bunya Mountains and flows west to Bell where it becomes a tributary of Jimbour Creek. Montgreen Provisional School opened on 28 January 1919. In 1921, it was renamed Walker's Creek State School. The school closed in August 1939, but reopened in January 1948. It closed permanently in December 1958. The school was on the western side of Walker Creek Road.
Wallingford State School	Wallingford (now in Irongate)	Toowoomba	1919	1967	27.6820°S 151.5451°E	Although the neighbourhood of Wallingford is now mostly within St Helens, Wallingford State School was at 147 Wallingford Road in Irongate.
Wambo Creek State School	via Chinchilla	Western Downs	1946	1961		
Wangary State School	Dargal Road	Maranoa	circa 1898	1930	26.52870°S 148.71713°E	Located at 709 Bungeworgorai Lane.
Watson's Crossing State School	Watsons Crossing	Goondiwindi	1939	1983	29.14195°S 151.32202°E	At the western end of Watsons Crossing Road.
Weengallon State School	Weengallon	Balonne	1916	1986		Weengallon State School (also written as Weengallan State School) opened on 13 April 1916. It closed in 1922 due to low attendances. On 30 January 1962, Weengallon State School re-opened. It closed permanently in 1986.
Weranga Provisional School	Weranga	Western Downs	1923	1924		
West Prairie Provisional School	West Prairie	Toowoomba	1925	1929		
Westbrook State School	Westbrook	Toowoomba	1910	1969	27.6061°S 151.8699°E	Formerly Westbrook Crossing State School. Located on the north-western corner of Barwick Street and Gore Street.
Westbrook Youth Centre	Westbrook	Toowoomba	1900	1994	27.6171°S 151.8308°E	Formerly Westbrook Reformatory School until 1919, Farm Home for Boys 1966. Located on a site bounded by Westbrook Wyreema Road, Toowoomba Athol Road and Althus Road.
Wetalla State School	Wetalla (now in east Cranley)	Toowoomba	1874	1932		Formerly Gowrie Creek until 1904. Wetalla is now in the east of Cranley near Gowrie Creek.
Whetstone State School	Whetstone	Goondiwindi	1917	1958	28.49834°S 150.93459°E	Whetstone Provisional School opened 9 July 1917. In 1926, it became Whetstone State School. It closed on 4 June 1958. It was on a 2-acre (0.81 ha) school reserve on the eastern side of the Cunningham Highway.
Whichello State School	Whichello	Toowoomba	1894	1942	27.29223°S 152.01097°E	Located on the northern side of Whichello School Road.
Wildash State School	Wildash	Southern Downs	1878	1938	28.31021°S 152.07446°E	Opened in 1878 as Lord John Swamp Provisional School, which subsequently became a state school in 1883. The name was changed to Wildash State School in 1924. Located on the north-west corner of Wildash School Road and Shepherd Lane.
Wilga View State School	near Broxburn	Toowoomba	1938	1959		
Willowburn (Home for Epileptics)	Rockville	Toowoomba	1916	1964		
Willowvale State School	Willowvale	Scenic Rim	1912	1967	28.1249°S 152.0313°E	Formerly Grayson Provisional/State School until 1912. Located on the south-west corner of Willowvale Road and Willowvale School Road.
Wilson's Peak State School	The Head	Southern Downs	1909	1944	28.2792°S 152.4391°E	Located at 1966 Condamine River Road.
Womalilla State School	Womalilla	Maranoa	1935	1954	approx 27.87320°S 151.42816°E	Located in the town centre.
Womalilla Creek Part-Time Provisional School No.1	Womalilla Creek	Maranoa	1914	1929		
Womalilla Creek Part-Time Provisional School No. 2	Womalilla Creek	Maranoa	1913	1929		
Wondalli Creek Provisional School	Yelarbon	Goondiwindi	1912	1916	approx 28.52409°S 150.70495°E	Also known as Wondalli Provisional School. On a 2-acre (0.81 ha) site on the western side of Woodcocks Road.
Willowvale State School	Willowvale	Southern Downs	1908	1967		
Woodlawn State School	Bunya Mountains south-west slopes, near Moola	Western Downs	1916	circa 1944	26.95892°S 151.53423°E	Located on the southern corner of the junction of Woodlawn Road and Woodlawn School Road.
Woodleighton State School	Woodleigh	Toowoomba	1910	c1961	27.0845°S 151.6808°E	Opened in 1910 as Cattle Gully Provisional School. Changed name to Woodleighton State School in 1924. Located at 590 Quinalow Woodleigh Road.
Woodview State School	Woodview (now in Yargullen)	Toowoomba	1886	1974	approx 27.4979°S 151.6154°E	Located on Woodview School Road.
Wutul State School	Wutul	Toowoomba	1914	1961	approx 27.02882°S 151.79877°E	Located on the Oakey-Cooyar Road.
Wyberba State School	Wyberba	Southern Downs	1895	1976	28.85610°S 151.87723°E	Located at 2394 Pyramids Road.
Wychie State School	Wychie	Western Downs	1946	1962	26.7408°S 150.8510°E	It was on Wychie Road.
Wycombe State School	Wycombe	Maranoa	1979	2009	27.5501°S 148.6206°E	Located on Dilqui Road. The school's website was archived.
Wynola State School	Wynola (now in north-east Killarney)	Southern Downs	1935	1941		
Yalebone Provisional School	Yalebone (now in Tingun)	Maranoa	1911	1925	approx 26.86862°S 148.76262°E	Yalebone Provisional School opened 17 July 1911. It closed circa September 1925. It was on Yalebone Creek Road.
Yamsion State School	Yamsion (now in north Moola)	Western Downs	1887	1967		Opened in 1887 as Black Gully Provisional School, which became a state school in 1890. It closed in 1899 and then reopened again during 1900. It closed in 1908, then opened and closed again in 1909. It opened in 1911 as Yamsion Half-Time Provisional School, which became a full-time state school in 1917. It closed permanently in 1967. Yamsion is now in north Moola.
Yarraman Upper State School	Upper Yarraman	Toowoomba	1905	2002	26.8919°S 151.8971°E	Located at 130 Upper Yarraman Road.
Yarranlea State School	Yarranlea	Toowoomba	1883	1977	27.7530°S 151.5392°E	Originally known as Hermitage State School. Located at 4688 Gore Highway.
Yee-Am State School	via Jandowae	Western Downs	1902	1921		Jondowaie Creek Provisional School opened on 6 February 1902. In 1903, it was renamed Yee-am Provisional School. On 1 January 1909. it became Yee-Am State School. It closed in April 1921.
Yellowbank Junction State School	Yellowbank (now in Westgrove)	Maranoa	1991	2001		
Yingerbay State School	Yingerbay (now in western Euthalla)	Maranoa	1895	1940		Yingerbay Provisional School opened on 27 May 1895 under teacher Miss Elizabeth Hinch. On 1 January 1909, it became Yingerbay State School. It closed in 1922, but reopened in 1934 before closing permanently in 1940.
Yowah State School	Yowah	Paroo	1998	2017	27.9679°S 144.6312°E	Located at 5 Harlequin Drive. Its website was archived.
Yuleba Creek State School	Yuleba Creek (now in Warkon)	Maranoa	1867	1999	26.8884°S 149.4429°E	Located on the southern side of Roma Condamine Road with Yuleba Creek flowing beside the school.

== Private schools ==
=== Catholic schools ===
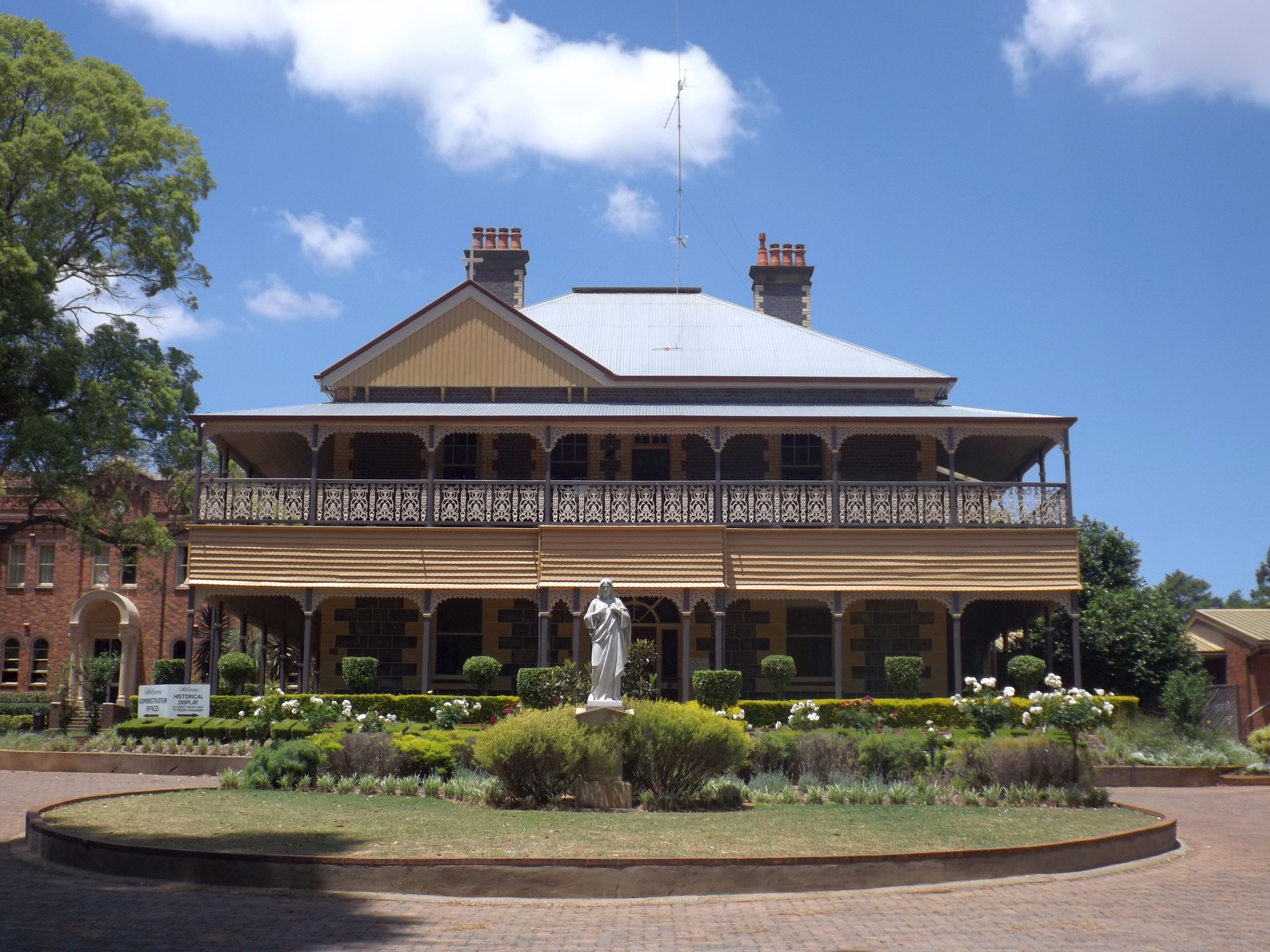
Tyson Manor at Downlands College, 2014

In Queensland, Catholic primary schools are usually (but not always) linked to a parish. Prior to the 1970s, most schools were founded by religious institutes, but with the decrease in membership of these institutes, together with major reforms inside the church, lay teachers and administrators began to take over the schools, a process which completed by approximately 1990.

Within the region, most schools are administered by the Catholic Education Office, Diocese of Toowoomba. They are supported by the Queensland Catholic Education Commission, which is responsible for coordinating administration, curriculum and policy across the Catholic school system. Preference for enrolment is given to Catholic students from the parish or local area, although non-Catholic students are admitted if room is available.

Name	Suburb	LGA	M/F/Co-ed	Years	Opened	Coordinates	Notes
Assumption College	Warwick	Southern Downs	Co-ed	7–12	1969		
Downlands College	Harlaxton	Toowoomba	Co-ed	P–12	1931		
Good Samaritan College	Toowoomba City	Toowoomba	Co-ed	7–12			Special School.
Holy Name Primary School	Toowoomba City	Toowoomba	Co-ed	P–6	1916		
Mary MacKillop Catholic College	Highfields	Toowoomba	Co-ed	P–12	2003	27.4512°S 151.9428°E	At 75 Highfields Road .
Mater Dei Primary School	East Toowoomba	Toowoomba	Co-ed	P–6	1917	27.5589°S 151.9738°E	At 53 Curzon Street.
McAuley College	Beaudesert	Scenic Rim	Co-ed	7–12	2017		
Our Lady of Lourdes School	Newtown	Toowoomba	Co-ed	P–6	1940		
Our Lady of the Southern Cross College	Dalby	Western Downs	Co-ed	P–12	2008	27.1718°S 151.2676°E	At 2 Nicholson Street.
Sacred Heart Primary School	Wilsonton	Toowoomba	Co-ed	P–6	1970		
Sacred Heart School	Cunnamulla	Paroo	Co-ed	P–6	1915	28.0725°S 145.6832°E	At 46 John Street.
St Anthony's School	Harristown	Toowoomba	Co-ed	P–6	1954		
St Finbarr's School	Quilpie	Quilpie	Co-ed	P–6	1950	26.6167°S 144.2701°E	On Jabiru Street.
St Francis de Sales School	Clifton	Toowoomba	Co-ed	P–6	1917	27.9287°S 151.9042°E	At 16 Meara Place .
St John's School	Roma	Maranoa	Co-ed	P–12	1942		
St Joseph's College	Rangeville	Toowoomba	Co-ed	7–12	1956		
St Joseph's Primary School	Chinchilla	Western Downs	Co-ed	P–6	1923	26.7435°S 150.6271°E	At 74 Middle Street.
St Joseph's School	Millmerran	Toowoomba	Co-ed	P–6	1959	27.8725°S 151.2716°E	At 25 Walpole Street.
St Joseph's School	Stanthorpe	Southern Downs	Co-ed	P–12	1875	28.6528°S 151.9381°E	At 100 High Street.
St Joseph's School	Tara	Western Downs	Co-ed	P–6	1965		
St Maria Goretti's School	Inglewood	Goondiwindi	Co-ed	P–6	1951		
St Mary's College	Newtown	Toowoomba	M	5–12	1899	27.5604°S 151.9431°E	At 129 West Street.
St Mary's School	Charleville	Murweh	Co-ed	P–6	1913		
St Mary's School	Goondiwindi	Goondiwindi	Co-ed	P–10	1911		
St Mary's School	Warwick	Southern Downs	Co-ed	P–6	1874		
St Monica's School	Oakey	Toowoomba	Co-ed	P–6	1921	27.4408°S 151.7193°E	At 75 Lorrimer Street.
St Patrick's Catholic Primary School	Allora	Southern Downs	Co-ed	P–6	1916		
St Patrick's School	Mitchell	Maranoa	Co-ed	P–6	1925	26.4841°S 147.9737°E	At 100 Alice Street.
St Patrick's School	St George	Balonne	Co-ed	P–6	1933	28.0353°S 148.5865°E	At 36–44 Balonne Street.
St Saviour's College	South Toowoomba	Toowoomba	F	7–12	1873		
St Saviour's Primary School	South Toowoomba	Toowoomba	Co-ed	P–6	1873		
St Stephen's School	Pittsworth	Toowoomba	Co-ed	P–6	1916	27.7189°S 151.6366°E	At 22 Murray Street.
St Thomas More's School	Centenary Heights	Toowoomba	Co-ed	P–6	1961		
St Ursula's College	Newtown	Toowoomba	F	7–12	1931		
Youth & Community Learning Centre	North Toowoomba	Toowoomba	Co-ed	9–12	2001		Alternative

=== Independent schools ===
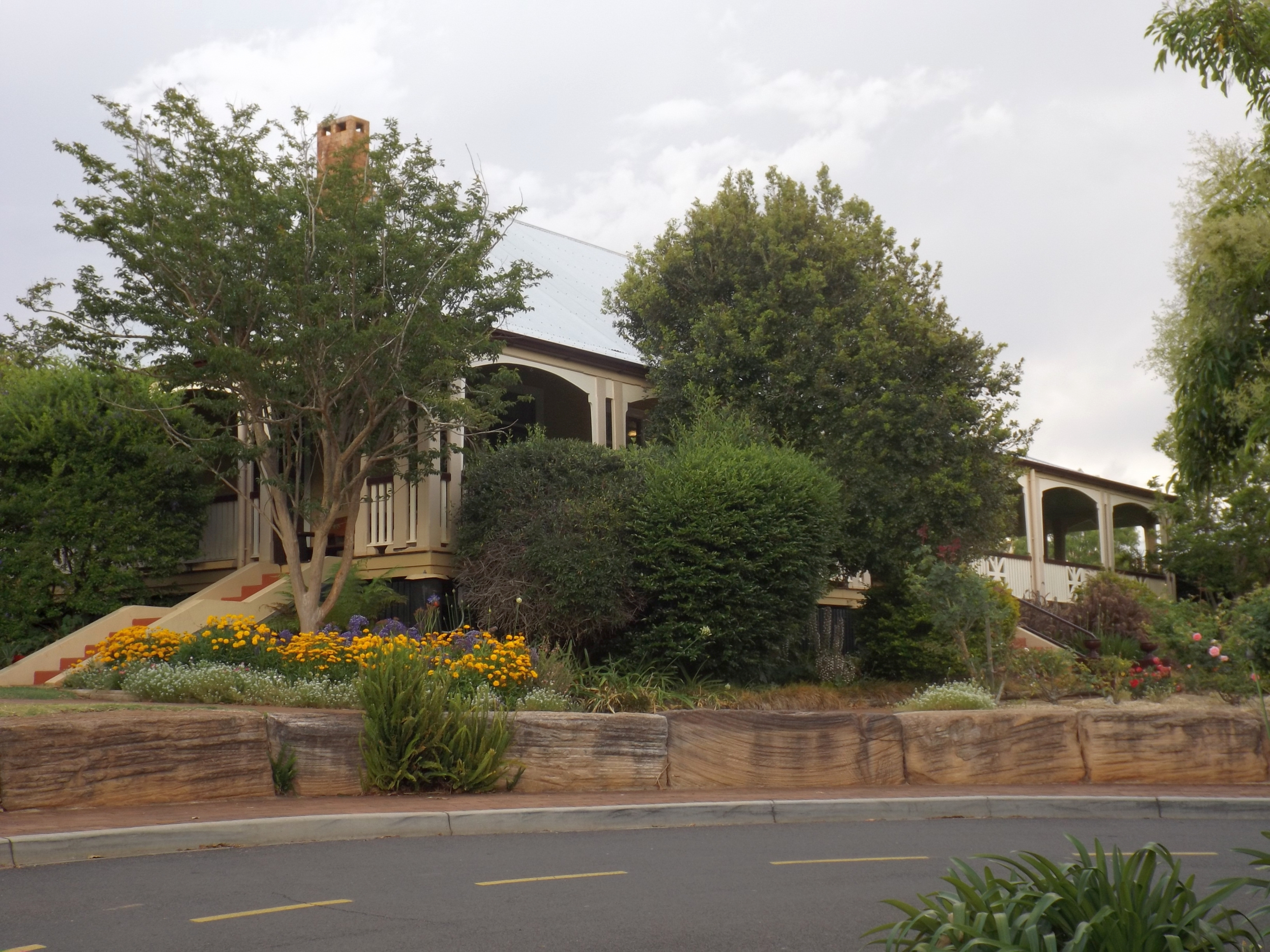
Fairholme College, East Toowoomba, 2014

Most independent schools cater for students from preparatory to year 12.

Name	Suburb	LGA	M/F/Co-ed	Years	Category	Opened	Coordinates	Notes
Border Rivers Christian College	Goondiwindi	Goondiwindi	Co-ed	P–12	Christian	2015		
Chinchilla Christian College	Chinchilla	Western Downs	Co-ed	P–12	Christian	1983	26.7378°S 150.6410°E	At 88 Oak Street.
Concordia Lutheran College	Harristown and North Toowoomba	Toowoomba	Co-ed	P–12	Lutheran	1946		
Dalby Christian College	Dalby	Western Downs	Co-ed	P–12	Christian	1981	27.1722°S 151.2780°E	At 2A Mary Street.
Darling Downs Adventist College	Glenvale	Toowoomba	Co-ed	P–12	Adventist	1942		Formerley Darling Downs Christian School
Fairholme College	East Toowoomba	Toowoomba	F	P–12	Presbyterian	1917	27.5553°S 151.9771°E	At 40 Wirra Wirra Street.
Glenvale Christian School	Glenvale	Toowoomba	Co-ed	P–6	Christian	1997		
Highlands Christian College	Kearneys Spring	Toowoomba	Co-ed	P–12	Christian	1982		
Maridahdi Early Childhood Community School	Rangeville	Toowoomba	Co-ed	P–6	Independent	2006		
Ming-De International School Toowoomba	Westbrook	Toowoomba	Co-ed	P–8	Independent			
OneSchool Global (Toowoomba campus)	Middle Ridge	Toowoomba	Co-ed	3–12	Plymouth Brethren Christian Church	2003	27.5987°S 151.9562°E	Formerly known as the Agnew School. At 40 Gerrard Street.
The Glennie School	Newtown	Toowoomba	F	P–12	Anglican	1908		
The Industry School	Toowoomba City	Toowoomba	Co-ed	10–12	No religious affiliation	2022		Formerley Australian Industry Trade College
The School of Total Education	Warwick	Southern Downs	Co-ed	P–12	Independent	1981		
The Scots PGC College	Warwick	Southern Downs	Co-ed	P–12	Uniting	1970		
Toowoomba Anglican School	East Toowoomba	Toowoomba	Co-ed	P–12	Anglican	1911	27.5589°S 151.9762°E	Formerly Toowoomba Anglican College and Preparatory School. At 2 Campbell Street.
Toowoomba Christian College	Highfields	Toowoomba	Co-ed	P–12	Christian	1979	27.4877°S 151.9492°E	At 10852 New England Highway.
Toowoomba Grammar School	East Toowoomba	Toowoomba	M	P–12	Independent	1877	27.5631°S 151.9691°E	At 24 Margaret Street.
Warwick Christian College	Warwick	Southern Downs	Co-ed	P–12	Christian	2007		

=== Defunct private schools ===
Name	Suburb	LGA	Category	Opened	Closed	Coordinates	Notes
Cabarlah Community School	Highfields	Toowoomba	Independent	2006	2015		
Christian Outreach College (Dalby)	Dalby	Western Downs	Christian	1984	1991		
Concordia Primary School	Harristown	Toowoomba	Lutheran primary	1964	2007		Merged into Concordia Lutheran College
Goondiwindi Christian Education Centre	Goondiwindi	Goondiwindi	Christian	1991	1996		
Holy Cross School	Miles	Western Downs	Catholic primary	1926	1989		
Mater Dei Secondary School		Toowoomba	Catholic secondary	1956	1974		
Mount Tully Community School	Severnlea	Southern Downs	Independent	1985	1994		
OneSchool Global (Warwick campus)	Warwick	Southern Downs	Plymouth Brethren Christian Church	2003	Before 2019		Co-ed Years 3–12. Formerly Agnew School. Has not operated since at least 2019.
Our Lady of the Assumption High School	Warwick	Southern Downs	Catholic girls	1876	1980		
Presbyterian Girls' College	Warwick	Southern Downs	Presbyterian girls	1918	1969		Amalgamated into The Scots PGC College
Sacred Heart School	Texas	Goondiwindi	Catholic primary	1935	1987		
St Catherine's School	Stanthorpe	Southern Downs	Anglican girls	1909	1936		Merged into St Catherine's Warwick
St Catherine's School	Warwick	Southern Downs	Anglican girls	1918	1978		
St Columba's Primary School	Dalby	Western Downs	Catholic primary	1877	2007		Amalgamated into Our Lady of the Southern Cross College
St Joseph's Christian Brothers' College	Warwick	Southern Downs	Catholic boys	1912	1980		Merged with Our Lady of the Assumption High School to form Assumption College, Warwick.
St Joseph's School	Augathella	Murweh	Catholic primary	1928	200?		
St Mary's College	Dalby	Western Downs	Catholic high	1963	2007		Amalgamated into Our Lady of the Southern Cross College
St Matthew's School	Crows Nest	Tooowoomba	Catholic primary	1917	????	approx 27.26116°S 152.05733°E	On the eastern side Esk Street The site is now vacant land.
Scots College	Warwick	Southern Downs	Presbyterian boys	1918	1969		Amalgamated into The Scots PGC College
Slade School	Warwick	Southern Downs	Independent	1926	1997		
Stanthorpe Adventist Primary School	Stanthorpe	Southern Downs	7DA	1982	2002		

== See also ==
- Lists of schools in Queensland
