= Langlands, Queensland =

Langlands
- Suburb
- Interactive map of Langlands
- Coordinates: 26.6941°S 150.9891°E
- Country: Australia
- State: Queensland
- LGA: Western Downs Region
- Location: 23.2 km (14.4 mi) NNW of Jandowae; 26.6 km (16.5 mi) S of Burra Burri; 42.9 km (26.7 mi) ENE of Chinchilla; 73.2 km (45.5 mi) NNW of Dalby; 281 km (175 mi) WNW of Brisbane

Government
  - State electorate: Callide
  - Federal division: Maranoa

Area
  - Total: 49.7 km^{2} (19.2 sq mi)
- Elevation: 340–350 m (1,120–1,150 ft)

Population
  - Total: 30 (2021 census)
  - Density: 0.60/km^{2} (1.56/sq mi)
- Time zone: UTC+10:00 (AEST)
- Postcode: 4413
Suburbs around Langlands
Canaga	Canaga	Jinghi
Canaga	Langlands	Jinghi
Tuckerang	Jinghi	Jinghi

Langlands is a rural locality in the Western Downs Region, Queensland, Australia. In the 2021 census, Langlands had a population of 30 people.

== Geography ==
The locality is bounded loosely by Canaga Creek to the north, Canaga Creek Road to the west, Lower Jinghi Road to the south and Carlishs Road and Gadsbys Road to the east.

The land is flat at 340 to 350 metres (1,120 to 1,150 ft) above sea level. The predominant land use is crop growing.

The Chinchilla–Wondai Road runs along the northern boundary.

== History ==
Langlands State School opened on 18 April 1922. It closed on 29 January 1962. It was at 1033 Langlands Hall Road (26.6865°S 151.0051°E). It was opposite the Langlands Hall (also called the East Canaga Hall) at (26.6876°S 151.0034°E).

== Demographics ==
In the 2016 census, Langlands had a population of 7 people.

In the 2021 census, Langlands had a population of 30 people.

== Economy ==
There are a number of homesteads in the locality:

- Elouera (26.7218°S 150.9915°E)
- Langlands (26.6859°S 150.9739°E)
- Pleasant View (26.7146°S 150.9804°E)
- Ponderosa (26.6723°S 151.0203°E)
- Torquay (26.7058°S 150.9865°E)

== Education ==
There are no schools in Langlands. The nearest government primary schools are Burra Burri State School in Burra Burri to the north and Jandowae State School in Jandowae to the south-east. The nearest government secondary school is Jandowae State School which provides secondary schooling to Year 10. For schooling to Year 12, the nearest government secondary school is Chinchilla State High School in Chinchilla to the west.
