= Chances Plain, Queensland =

Chances Plain
- Suburb
- Interactive map of Chances Plain
- Coordinates: 26.7352°S 150.7461°E
- Country: Australia
- State: Queensland
- LGA: Western Downs Region
- Location: 6.9 km (4.3 mi) E of Chinchilla; 81 km (50 mi) NW of Dalby; 187 km (116 mi) NW of Toowoomba; 292 km (181 mi) NW of Brisbane

Government
  - State electorate: Callide
  - Federal division: Maranoa

Area
  - Total: 129.9 km^{2} (50.2 sq mi)

Population
  - Total: 158 (2021 census)
  - Density: 1.216/km^{2} (3.150/sq mi)
- Time zone: UTC+10:00 (AEST)
- Postcode: 4413
Suburbs around Chances Plain
Red Hill	Burncluith	Canaga
Chinchilla	Chances Plain	Wychie
Boonarga	Brigalow	Wychie

Chances Plain is a rural locality in the Western Downs Region, Queensland, Australia. In the 2021 census, Chances Plain had a population of 158 people.

== Geography ==
The Chinchilla–Wondai Road runs along the northern boundary, and the Warrego Highway forms the south-western boundary.

== Demographics ==
In the 2016 census, Chances Plain had a population of 151 people.

In the 2021 census, Chances Plain had a population of 158 people.

== Education ==
There are no schools in Chances Plain. The nearest government primary schools are Chinchilla State School in neighbouring Chinchilla to the west and Brigalow State School in neighbouring Brigalow to the south. The nearest government secondary school is Chinchilla State High School in Chinchilla. There are also non-government schools in Chinchilla.
