= Burncluith, Queensland =

Burncluith
- Suburb
- Interactive map of Burncluith
- Coordinates: 26.5805°S 150.7291°E
- Country: Australia
- State: Queensland
- LGA: Western Downs Region
- Location: 26.0 km (16.2 mi) NE of Chinchilla; 102 km (63 mi) NNW of Dalby; 199 km (124 mi) NW of Toowoomba; 313 km (194 mi) NW of Brisbane

Government
  - State electorate: Callide
  - Federal division: Maranoa

Area
  - Total: 313.5 km^{2} (121.0 sq mi)

Population
  - Total: 137 (2021 census)
  - Density: 0.4370/km^{2} (1.132/sq mi)
- Time zone: UTC+10:00 (AEST)
- Postcode: 4413
Suburbs around Burncluith
Blackswamp	Barakula	Fairyland
Red Hill	Burncluith	Pelican
Chances Plain	Chances Plain	Canaga

Burncluith is a rural locality in the Western Downs Region, Queensland, Australia. In the 2021 census, Burncluith had a population of 137 people.

== Geography ==
The Chinchilla–Wondai Road passes the southern boundary.

== History ==
Burncluith Provisional School opened on 28 July 1909. In 1915 it became Burcluith State School. It closed in August 1962. The school was in Burncluith School Road (now Burncluith Hall Road, 26.6186°S 150.7116°E).

Brownlea State School opened on 31 January 1950 but closed in 1952. It was on the north-east corner of Rennicks Road and G Tennyson Road (26.5669°S 150.7068°E).

The Burncluith Memorial Hall was opened in 1953 to commemorate those from the district who did military service.

== Demographics ==
In the 2016 census Burncluith had a population of 150 people.

In the 2021 census, Burncluith had a population of 137 people.

== Education ==
There are no schools in Burncluith. The nearest government primary schools are Chinchilla State School in Chinchilla to the south-west and Burra Burri State School in Burra Burri to the north-east. The nearest government secondary school is Chinchilla State High School, also in Chinchilla.

== Amenities ==
Burncluith Memorial Hall is at 1038 Burncluith Hall Road (26.6185°S 150.7134°E) to the east of the former school. It is operated by the Burncluith Memorial Hall Committee. The hall contains the Burncluith Soldiers Memorial Hall Honour Roll which honours those who served in World War II and the Korean War.
