= Pelican, Queensland =

Pelican
- Suburb
- Interactive map of Pelican
- Coordinates: 26.6205°S 150.8511°E
- Country: Australia
- State: Queensland
- LGA: Western Downs Region
- Location: 34.5 km (21.4 mi) ENE of Chinchilla; 93.0 km (57.8 mi) NNW of Dalby; 176 km (109 mi) NW of Toowoomba; 305 km (190 mi) WNW of Brisbane

Government
  - State electorate: Callide
  - Federal division: Maranoa

Area
  - Total: 99.1 km^{2} (38.3 sq mi)

Population
  - Total: 40 (2021 census)
  - Density: 0.40/km^{2} (1.05/sq mi)
- Time zone: UTC+10:00 (AEST)
- Postcode: 4413
Suburbs around Pelican
Burncluith	Fairyland	Canaga
Burncluith	Pelican	Canaga
Burncluith	Canaga	Canaga

Pelican is a rural locality in the Western Downs Region, Queensland, Australia. In the 2021 census, Pelican had a population of 40 people.

== Geography ==
The locality is bounded to the south by Charleys Creek and the Chinchilla - Wondai Road.

The land use is grazing on native vegetation with some crop growing.

== History ==
The locality is named after Pelican Station, a pastoral run operated by James Ivory in the early 1850s. It is assumed that pelicans were seen at times on nearby Pelican Lagoon.

Pelican Provisional School opened on 22 June 1908, becoming Pelican State School on 1 January 1909, closing about June 1932. It reopened in December 1940, closing in 1986. It was on Burra Burri Creek Road (26.6037°S 150.8684°E).

== Demographics ==
In the 2016 census. Pelican had a population of 14 people.

In the 2021 census, Pelican had a population of 40 people.

== Education ==
There are no schools in Pelican. The nearest government primary schools are Burra Burri State School in Burra Burri to the north-east, Brigalow State School in Brigalow to the south, and Chinchilla State School in Chinchilla to the south-west. The nearest government secondary school is Chinchilla State High School, also in Chinchilla.
