= Canaga, Queensland =

Canaga
- Suburb
- Interactive map of Canaga
- Coordinates: 26.6472°S 150.9130°E
- Country: Australia
- State: Queensland
- LGA: Western Downs Region
- Location: 31.7 km (19.7 mi) ENE of Chinchilla; 76.7 km (47.7 mi) NW of Dalby; 164 km (102 mi) NW of Toowoomba; 292 km (181 mi) NW of Brisbane

Government
  - State electorate: Callide
  - Federal division: Maranoa

Area
  - Total: 191.8 km^{2} (74.1 sq mi)

Population
  - Total: 85 (2021 census)
  - Density: 0.4432/km^{2} (1.148/sq mi)
- Time zone: UTC+10:00 (AEST)
- Postcode: 4413
Suburbs around Canaga
Pelican	Fairyland	Fairyland
Burncluith	Canaga	Jinghi
Chances Plain	Wychie; Tuckerang	Langlands

Canaga is a rural locality in the Western Downs Region, Queensland, Australia. In the 2021 census, Canaga had a population of 85 people.

== Geography ==
The Chinchilla–Wondai Road runs through from west to east.

== History ==
The locality names is derived from the parish name which in turn was the name of a pastoral run held during the early 1850s by Arthur Lloyd and transferred to Joshua and Alexander Bell in 1853.

Canaga State School opened in November 1911 and closed in 1962. The school was located at 3258 Chinchilla Wondai Road (26.6753°S 150.9215°E). The site is now a recreation area managed by the Western Downs Regional Council.

== Demographics ==
In the 2016 census, Canaga had a population of 110 people.

In the 2021 census, Canaga had a population of 85 people.

== Education ==
There are no schools in Canaga. The nearest government primary schools are:

- Burra Burri State School in Burra Burri to the north-east
- Jandowae State School in Jandowae to the south-east
- Brigalow State School in Brigalow to the south
- Chinchilla State School in Chinchilla to the south-west

The nearest government secondary school is Jandowae State School (to Year 10) in Jandowae and Chinchilla State High School (to Year 12) in Chinchilla.
