= Dalby Christian College =

Location
- 14 Irvingdale Road; Dalby, Queensland; Australia; 27°10′19.80″S 151°16′41.20″E

Information
- Type: Independent, co-educational, day school, boarding school
- Motto: Educating for life equipping for eternity
- Established: 1981; 45 years ago
- Principal: Stephen Wilson OAM
- Enrolment: 449 (2023)
- Campus: Urban
- Colours: Blue, green & navy blue
- Website: www.dalbycc.qld.edu.au

Dalby Christian College is an independent non-denominational Christian co-educational P-12, school, located in the rural town of Dalby, Queensland, Australia. It is administered by Christian Community Ministries Ltd., with an enrolment of 449 students and a teaching staff of 31, as of 2023. The school serves students from Prep to Year 12.

== History ==
The school opened on the 1 February 1981. It was one of eleven private schools to be accused of potential discrimination against homosexuals in 2022.

== Demographics ==
In 2023, the school had a student enrollment of 449 with 31 teachers (28.2 full-time equivalent) and 20 non-teaching staff (15.1 full-time equivalent). Female enrollments consisted of 214 students and Male enrollments consisted of 235 students; Indigenous enrollments accounted for a total of 8% and 3% of students had a language background other than English.

== Notable staff ==
- Stephen Wilson, Australian Paralympic athlete.

== See also ==
- Education in Australia
- List of schools in Darling Downs
