= Red Hill, Queensland (Western Downs Region) =

Red Hill
- Suburb
- Interactive map of Red Hill
- Coordinates: 26.6386°S 150.6480°E
- Country: Australia
- State: Queensland
- LGA: Western Downs Region
- Location: 14.0 km (8.7 mi) N of Chinchilla; 92.6 km (57.5 mi) NW of Dalby; 175 km (109 mi) NW of Toowoomba; 303 km (188 mi) WNW of Brisbane

Government
  - State electorate: Callide
  - Federal division: Maranoa

Area
  - Total: 139.4 km^{2} (53.8 sq mi)

Population
  - Total: 160 (2021 census)
  - Density: 1.15/km^{2} (2.97/sq mi)
- Time zone: UTC+10:00 (AEST)
- Postcode: 4413
Suburbs around Red Hill
Blackswamp	Burncluith	Burncluith
Blackswamp	Red Hill	Burncluith
Baking Board	Chinchilla	Chances Plain

Red Hill is a rural locality in the Western Downs Region, Queensland, Australia. In the 2021 census, Red Hill had a population of 160 people.

== Geography ==
The Chinchilla–Wondai Road passes the south-eastern boundary.

== History ==
Rosebank State School opened in 1909. It closed circa 1915. It was on the western side at the bend in Holmes Road (approx 26.7301°S 151.3820°E).

The locality was officially named and bounded on 27 October 2000.

== Demographics ==
In the 2016 census, Red Hill had a population of 60 people.

In the 2021 census, Red Hill had a population of 160 people.

== Education ==
There are no schools in Red Hill. The nearest government primary and secondary schools are Chinchilla State School and Chinchilla State High School, both in neighbouring Chinchilla to the south.
