= Fairyland, Queensland =

Fairyland
- Suburb
- Interactive map of Fairyland
- Coordinates: 26.5280°S 150.9336°E
- Country: Australia
- State: Queensland
- LGA: Western Downs Region
- Location: 45.7 km (28.4 mi) NE of Chinchilla; 88.8 km (55.2 mi) NNW of Dalby; 172 km (107 mi) NW of Toowoomba; 299 km (186 mi) NW of Brisbane

Government
  - State electorate: Callide
  - Federal division: Maranoa

Area
  - Total: 266.3 km^{2} (102.8 sq mi)

Population
  - Total: 90 (2021 census)
  - Density: 0.338/km^{2} (0.88/sq mi)
- Time zone: UTC+10:00 (AEST)
- Postcode: 4413
Suburbs around Fairyland
Barakula	Durah	Burra Burri
Burncluith	Fairyland	Burra Burri
Pelican	Canaga	Jinghi

Fairyland is a rural locality in the Western Downs Region, Queensland, Australia. In the 2021 census, Fairyland had a population of 90 people.

== Geography ==
Fairyland is a rural locality. The land in the northernmost part of the locality is part of Barakula State Forest, while the land in the southeastern part of the locality is part of Nudley State Forest.

Nudley is a neighbourhood within Fairyland at 26°33′S 150°5′E.

The Chinchilla–Wondai Road passes the south-eastern corner.

Apart from the state forests, the land use is predominantly grazing on native vegetation with some crop-growing.

== History ==
The locality name is presumably derived from the Fairyland pastoral run, which in 1863 had an estimated carrying capacity of 4,000 sheep.

Nudley State School opened on 24 November 1913 and closed in 1956. It was on Nudley School Road (26.5351°S 150.8525°E).

Fairyland West Provisional School opened on 1 May 1941, becoming Fairyland West State School on 26 April 1957. It closed in 1980. It was located on Fairyland School Road, just east of Charleys Creek (approx 26.4525°S 150.8886°E), now within the neighbouring locality of Durah.

Between January and March 2023, a number of bushfires burnt thousands of hectares of land, impacting the communities of Tara, Fairyland, Myall Park, and Montrose.

== Demographics ==
In the 2016 census, Fairyland had a population of 67 people.

In the 2021 census, Fairyland had a population of 90 people.

== Education ==
There are no schools in Fairyland. The nearest government primary school is Burra Burri State School in neighbouring Burra Burri to the east. The nearest government secondary schools are Jandowae State School (to Year 10) in Jandowae to the south-east and Chinchilla State High School (to Year 12) in Chinchilla to the south-west.
