= Wychie, Queensland =

Wychie
- Suburb
- Interactive map of Wychie
- Coordinates: 26.7802°S 150.8575°E
- Country: Australia
- State: Queensland
- LGA: Western Downs Region
- Location: 26.8 km (16.7 mi) W of Jandowae; 29.0 km (18.0 mi) E of Chinchilla; 74.2 km (46.1 mi) NW of Dalby; 157 km (98 mi) NW of Toowoomba; 284 km (176 mi) NW of Brisbane

Government
  - State electorate: Callide
  - Federal division: Maranoa

Area
  - Total: 69.1 km^{2} (26.7 sq mi)
- Elevation: 320 m (1,050 ft)

Population
  - Total: 30 (2021 census)
  - Density: 0.43/km^{2} (1.12/sq mi)
- Time zone: UTC+10:00 (AEST)
- Postcode: 4412
Suburbs around Wychie
Canaga	Canaga	Canaga
Chances Plain	Wychie	Tuckerang
Brigalow	Brigalow	Warra

Wychie is a rural locality in the Western Downs Region, Queensland, Australia. In the 2021 census, Wychie had a population of 30 people.

== Geography ==
Noola Plain is within the locality (26.8°S 150.85°E). The locality is flat at approx 320 metres (1,050 ft) above sea level.

The land use is predominantly crop growing.

== History ==
The Bethania Lutheran Church opened in Brigalow in 1914. It closed in 1961. Although the church building has been removed, its cemetery remains (and is now within the locality boundaries of Wychie).

Blackwood Provisional School opened on 19 July 1915 and closed on 27 October 1932. On 12 November 1932, the school was reopened and renamed Belah State School. It closed in 1962. In 1921, the school was on Inverai Road (26.7601°S 150.8508°E). In 1938, the school was at 1249 Ehlma Boundary Road (26.7832°S 150.8855°E).

Noola State School opened on 5 April 1923. Circa 1957, it renamed Noola Plains State School. It closed circa 1961. It was at 600 Brigalow Canaga Creek Road (26.8069°S 150.8219°E).

Wychie State School opened on 15 July 1946 and closed on 29 January 1962. It was on Wychie Road (26.7408°S 150.8510°E).

== Demographics ==
In the 2016 census, Wychie had a population of 17 people.

In the 2021 census, Wychie had a population of 30 people.

== Education ==
There are no schools in Wychie. The nearest government primary schools are Brigalow State School in neighbouring Brigalow to the south-west and Warra State School in neighbouring Warra to the south-east. The nearest government secondary schools are Jandowae State School (to Year 10) in Jandowae to the east and Chinchilla State High School (to Year 12) in Chinchilla to the west.

== Facilities ==
Brigalow Lutheran Cemetery is on the eastern corner of Brigalow Canaga Creek Road and Haystack Road (26.8078°S 150.8215°E).
