= Tuckerang, Queensland =

Tuckerang
- Suburb
- Interactive map of Tuckerang
- Coordinates: 26.7944°S 150.9827°E
- Country: Australia
- State: Queensland
- LGA: Western Downs Region
- Location: 38.4 km (23.9 mi) E of Chinchilla; 65.4 km (40.6 mi) NNW of Dalby; 148 km (92 mi) NW of Toowoomba; 276 km (171 mi) NW of Brisbane

Government
  - State electorate: Callide
  - Federal division: Maranoa

Area
  - Total: 236.8 km^{2} (91.4 sq mi)

Population
  - Total: 111 (2021 census)
  - Density: 0.4688/km^{2} (1.214/sq mi)
- Time zone: UTC+10:00 (AEST)
- Postcode: 4350
Suburbs around Tuckerang
Canaga	Langlands	Jinghi
Wychie	Tuckerang	Jandowae
Brigalow	Warra	Jimbour West

Tuckerang is a rural locality in the Western Downs Region, Queensland, Australia. In the 2021 census, Tuckerang had a population of 111 people.

== Geography ==
Inverai is a neighbourhood in the north-west of locality (26.7666°S 150.95°E).

Haystack is a neighbourhood in the south-west of the locality on the boundary with Warra (26.85°S 150.92°E).

== History ==
George Wood acquired land in the area in 1906 which he called Inverai, which is suspected to be a name he made up.

Inverai Provisional School opened on 5 October 1908. On 1 January 1909, it became Inverai State School. It closed on 31 December 1960. It was on the north-western corner of Inverai Road and Warra Canaga Creek Road (26.7717°S 150.9451°E).

Daiwan State School opened in 1910. It may also have been known as Haystack Plains State School. In 1924, it was renamed Haystack State School. It closed in 1968. In 1921, it was on the south-west corner of Haystack Noola Road and Haystack North Road in Tuckerang (26.8215°S 150.9182°E). In 1938, it was at 1054 Haystack Road in neighbouring Warra (26.8471°S 150.9146°E).

Tuckerang Provisional School opened in 1924 and closed circa 1929.

The Inverai Hall was officially opened on Thursday 27 March 1927, although it had been open for use since circa December 1926.

== Demographics ==
In the 2016 census, Tuckerang had a population of 85 people.

In the 2021 census, Tuckerang had a population of 111 people.

== Education ==
There are no schools in Tuckerang. The nearest government primary schools are Jandowae State School in neighbouring Jandowae to the east, Warra State School in neighbouring Warra to the south, and Brigalow State School in neighbouring Brigalow to the south-west. The nearest government secondary schools are Chinchilla State High School (to Year 12) in Chinchilla to the west, Jandowae State School (to Year 10) in Jandowae, and Dalby State High School (to Year 12) in Dalby to the south-east.

== Amenities ==
Inverai Pioneer Memorial Hall is a public hall at 1911 Warra–Canaga Creek Road (26.7645°S 150.9467°E). It was built to commemorate the pioneers in the district with an honour roll of those from the district who have served in the Australian military. It has a theatre-style hall with a capacity of 100-249 people. It is managed by the Inverai Pioneer Memorial Hall Committee.
