= Jinghi, Queensland =

Jinghi
- Suburb
- Interactive map of Jinghi
- Coordinates: 26.6447°S 151.1069°E
- Country: Australia
- State: Queensland
- LGA: Western Downs Region
- Location: 61.8 km (38.4 mi) ENE of Chinchilla; 77.2 km (48.0 mi) N of Dalby; 158 km (98 mi) NW of Toowoomba; 286 km (178 mi) NW of Brisbane

Government
  - State electorate: Callide
  - Federal division: Maranoa

Area
  - Total: 211.6 km^{2} (81.7 sq mi)
- Elevation: 340–470 m (1,120–1,540 ft)

Population
  - Total: 70 (2021 census)
  - Density: 0.331/km^{2} (0.86/sq mi)
- Time zone: UTC+10:00 (AEST)
- Postcode: 4410
Suburbs around Jinghi
Fairyland	Burra Burri	Darr Creek
Canaga	Jinghi	Diamondy
Langlands	Tuckerang	Jandowae

Jinghi is a rural locality in the Western Downs Region, Queensland, Australia. In the 2021 census, Jinghi had a population of 70 people.

Jinghi's postcode is 4410.

== Geography ==
The locality is flatter in the south 340 to 360 metres (1,120 to 1,180 ft) above sea level but in the north it becomes more mountainous with peaks to 470 metres (1,540 ft).

Canaga Creek rises in the north-east to the locality and flows south-west through the locality exiting to Canaga / Langlands to the west. The creek takes its name for a pastoral run held during the early 1850s by Arthur Lloyd and transferred to Joshua and Alexander Bell in 1853. Jingi Jingi Creek rises in neighbouring Diamondy and enters this locality from the east and then flows south-west to exit this locality from the south to Tuckerang. Both creeks are tributaries of the Condamine River and part of the Murray-Darling drainage basin.

The north-west corner of the locality is within Nudley State Forest (26.6078°S 151.0537°E) which extends into neighbouring Fairyland and Burra Burri. Apart from the forest the land use is mostly grazing on native vegetation (more to the north of the locality) and crop growing (more to the south of the locality).

The Jandowae Connection Road (State Route 82) enters from the south, where it meets the Chinchilla–Wondai Road. This road continues north-east as State Route 82, and also runs west with no shield.

== History ==
The locality was originally known as Jinghi Valley, which took its name from the pastoral run Jinghi Jinghi operated by Joseph King in 1849 and may have originally been part of Jimbour. The name is probably an Aboriginal word.

Jinghi Gully State School opened on 5 July 1915. In 1952 it was renamed Jinghi Valley State School. It closed in 1967. It was on the southern corner of Jinghi Gully Road and Grundys Road (26.6831°S 151.1642°E).

Jinghi Lower State School opened on 30 May 1916 and closed on 24 January 1960. It was at Lower Jinghi School Road (26.7459°S 151.0523°E).

Jinghi District Hall was officially opened on Saturday 4 February 1933 by Jim Sparkes, the local Member of the Queensland Legislative Assembly for Dalby.

== Demographics ==
In the 2016 census, Jinghi had a population of 74 people.

In the 2021 census, Jinghi had a population of 70 people.

== Economy ==
There are a number of homesteads in the locality:

- Belhaville (26.6897°S 151.0190°E)
- Bricabrac (26.7126°S 151.0230°E)
- Cabandah (26.6634°S 151.0665°E)
- Cabandilla (26.6405°S 151.0683°E)
- Clayburn (26.6502°S 151.1285°E)
- Jinghi Jinghi (26.6927°S 151.0960°E)
- Kia-Ora (26.6670°S 151.1238°E)
- Mayfield (26.6492°S 151.0475°E)
- Mayfield (26.6989°S 151.0606°E)
- Millwood (26.5750°S 151.1819°E)
- Omeo (26.6919°S 151.0369°E)
- Taldra (26.6081°S 151.0866°E)
- The Rest (26.6433°S 151.1127°E)

There are some historic stock routes and associated camping reserves in Jinghi. Although officially still open, they are unused.

== Education ==
There are no schools in Jinghi. The nearest government primary schools are Burra Burri State School in neighbouring Burra Burri to the north-west and Jandowae State School in neighbouring Jandowae to the south-east. The nearest government secondary school is Jandowae State School which provides secondary schooling to Year 10. For schooling to Year 12, the nearest government secondary schools are Chinchilla State High School in Chinchilla to the west and Dalby State High School in Dalby.

== Amenities ==
Jandowae Golf Club is a 18-hole golf course at 19 Braziers Road (26.7163°S 151.0856°E) open to the public.

Jinghi District Hall is at 230 Grundys Road (26.6820°S 151.1645°E).
