= Darr Creek, Queensland =

Darr Creek
- Suburb
- Interactive map of Darr Creek
- Coordinates: 26.5219°S 151.1572°E
- Country: Australia
- State: Queensland
- LGA: Western Downs Region
- Location: 36.2 km (22.5 mi) N of Jandowae; 70.1 km (43.6 mi) ENE of Chinchilla; 84.7 km (52.6 mi) N of Dalby; 168 km (104 mi) NW of Toowoomba; 295 km (183 mi) NW of Brisbane

Government
  - State electorate: Callide
  - Federal division: Maranoa

Area
  - Total: 108.5 km^{2} (41.9 sq mi)

Population
  - Total: 13 (2021 census)
  - Density: 0.120/km^{2} (0.310/sq mi)
- Time zone: UTC+10:00 (AEST)
- Postcode: 4410
Suburbs around Darr Creek
Burra Burri	Durong	Durong
Burra Burri	Darr Creek	Chahpingah
Jinghi	Jinghi	Diamondy

Darr Creek is a rural locality in the Western Downs Region, Queensland, Australia. In the 2021 census, Darr Creek had a population of 13 people.

Darr Creek's postcode is 4410.

== Geography ==
The locality is bounded to the east by Craig Range (part of the Great Dividing Range). The locality drains westward into Murray Darling basin, specifically within the catchment of the Condamine River.

Millingwood is a neighbourhood in the south-east of the locality (26.5333°S 151.1833°E).

The Chinchilla–Wondai Road (State Route 82) enters the locality from the south (Jinghi) and exits to the north (Durong).

Part of the Diamondy State Forest is in the east of the locality extending into the neighbouring localities of Chahpingah and Diamondy. Apart from this protected area, the land use is grazing on native vegetation in the south and east of the locality with a mixture of grazing and crop growing in the north and west of the locality.

== History ==
The locality takes its name from creek on the old Darr pastoral run held by Thorne and Ridler during the early 1850s. Although it may actually be an abbreviated form of Daarbarah Creek named as such on a 1845 map, drawn by Thomas Domville Taylor on an expedition with Ludwig Leichhardt through the area on their way to what is now Darwin.

Darr Creek State School opened on 26 April 1922 and closed in May 1961. The school was at 6389 Chinchilla Wondai Road (formerly known as the Condamine Highway, 26.5309°S 151.1352°E).

Millingwood Provisional School opened on 4 May 1937 and closed in 1952. It was on Millingwood Road at approx 26.5376°S 151.1759°E.

== Demographics ==
In the 2016 census, Darr Creek had a population of 18 people.

In the 2021 census, Darr Creek had a population of 13 people.

== Education ==
There are no schools in Darr Creek. The nearest government primary school is Burra Burri State School in neighbouring Burra Burri to the west. The nearest government secondary school is Jandowae State School (to Year 10) in Jandowae to the south. There are no nearby schools providing education to Year 12; the alternatives are distance education and boarding school.
