= Burra Burri, Queensland =

Burra Burri
- Suburb
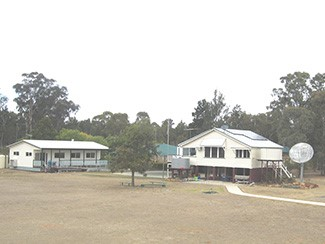
- Burra Burri State School

- Interactive map of Burra Burri
- Coordinates: 26.4241°S 151.0475°E
- Country: Australia
- State: Queensland
- LGA: Western Downs Region
- Location: 42.2 km (26.2 mi) N of Jandowae; 57.0 km (35.4 mi) NE of Chinchilla; 116 km (72 mi) NNW of Dalby; 330 km (210 mi) NW of Brisbane

Government
  - State electorate: Callide
  - Federal divisions: Maranoa; Flynn

Area
  - Total: 373.9 km^{2} (144.4 sq mi)

Population
  - Total: 32 (2021 census)
  - Density: 0.0856/km^{2} (0.222/sq mi)
- Time zone: UTC+10:00 (AEST)
- Postcode: 4413
Suburbs around Burra Burri
Durah	Boondooma	Boondooma
Durah	Burra Burri	Durong
Fairyland	Jinghi	Darr Creek

Burra Burri is a locality in the Western Downs Region, Queensland, Australia. In the 2021 census, Burra Burri had a population of 32 people.

== Geography ==
Burraburri Creek flows from the north to the south-west of the locality. To the west of the creedk, the terrain is more mountainous and the predominant industry is forestry; some of which is within the Barakula State Forest. To the east of the creek, the land is flatter and the predominant land use is grazing on native vegetation.

== History ==
Burra Burri Provisional School and the Burra Burri Junction Provisional School opened in 1916, operating as half-time schools (sharing a teacher). In 1923 Burra Burri Junction Provisional School burned down and reopened under the name of Washpool Provisional School (still a half-time school with Burra Burri Provisional School). In 1927 the Burra Burri Provisional School was closed and on 16 May 1927 Washpool became a full-time state school. In 1957 Washpool State School was renamed Burra Burri State School.

The school celebrated its centenary on 10 September 2016.

== Demographics ==
In the 2016 census, Burra Burri had a population of 36 people.

In the 2021 census, Burra Burri had a population of 32 people.

== Education ==
Burra Burri State School is a government primary (Prep-6) school for boys and girls at 3173 Burra Burri Creek Road (26.5093°S 151.0237°E). In 2017, the school had an enrolment of 9 students with 4 teachers (2 full-time equivalent) and 5 non-teaching staff (2 full-time equivalent). In 2019, there were 5 students enrolled. Since then, the school has remained officially open but is not operating as there are no students enrolled.

There are no secondary schools in Burra Burri. The nearest government secondary schools are Jandowae State School (to Year 10) in Jandowae and Chinchilla State High School (to Year 12) in Chinchilla.

== Amenities ==
Western Downs Regional Council operates the Burra Burri Hall on the corner of Burra Burri Darr Creek Road and Burra Burri Creek Road (26.5097°S 151.0235°E).

The Burra Burri branch of the Queensland Country Women's Association meets at the Burra Burri Hall.
