= Chinchilla–Wondai Road =

Road in Queensland, Australia

Chinchilla–Wondai Road Queensland

General information
- Type: Rural road
- Length: 151.6 km (94 mi)
- Route number(s): No shield (Chinchilla – Jinghi); State Route 82 (Jinghi – Tingoora)

Major junctions
- West end: Warrego Highway Chinchilla
- Jandowae Connection Road; Mundubbera–Durong Road
- East end: Bunya Highway Tingoora

Location(s)
- Major settlements: Canaga, Jinghi, Darr Creek, Durong, Ballogie, Wilkesdale, Cushnie

Chinchilla–Wondai Road is a continuous 151.6 kilometres (94.2 mi) road route in the Western Downs and South Burnett regions of Queensland, Australia. Part of the route is signed as State Route 82. It is a state-controlled part regional and part district road (number 426). It provides an alternate route between the Warrego Highway and the South Burnett, bypassing Dalby, Oakey and Toowoomba.

== Route Description ==
The road commences at an intersection with the Warrego Highway in Chinchilla. It runs generally north-east through Chinchilla, following Colamba Street and Park Street until it becomes Chinchilla–Wondai Road. It runs north-east and east through mixed farming land, passing through Canaga and reaching the Jandowae Connection Road (State Route 82) in Jinghi. Jandowae Connection Road runs south to Jandowae, and Chinchilla–Wondai Road runs north and then north-east as State Route 82.

The road continues north and east through Darr Creek to Durong, where Mundubbera–Durong Road exits to the north as State Route 75. From there it continues east to Ballogie, crossing the Boyne River. Here the country is more thickly timbered, with the principal land use being stock raising on native vegetation. The road continues east through Wilkesdale to Cushnie, where crop growing is predominant. It ends at an intersection with the Bunya Highway in Tingoora. The town of Wondai is about 8 kilometres (5.0 mi) north-east of this intersection.

== Road condition ==
The road is fully sealed. It has a distance of about 2.1 kilometres (1.3 mi) with an incline greater than 5%. The road reaches its highest point in Wilkesdale, at an elevation of 488 metres (1,601 ft) above sea level.

== State Route 82 ==
State Route 82 follows a number of separately named roads from Tingoora (near Wondai) to Inglewood. It is not necessarily the best or the shortest or the quickest route between the two termini. It was proclaimed as a State Route because, at the time, it was the most convenient route for many users. It is also an example of why motorists in unfamiliar territory should follow a designated route rather than rely on a vehicle navigation system, which may direct them onto less suitable alternative roads.

The route follows Chinchilla–Wondai Road west from Tingoora to Durong, where it turns south to Jinghi. Here the Chinchilla–Wondai Road turns west, while State Route 82 continues south on Jandowae Connection Road to Jandowae. In Jandowae the road name changes to Dalby–Jandowae Road, which continues to the Warrego Highway in the west of Dalby. From there it follows the Warrego Highway to the south-east until it reaches Dalby–Cecil Plains Road, where it continues south.

At a T-junction in Cecil Plains, State Route 82 turns east on Toowoomba–Cecil Plains Road until it reaches Pampas–Horrane Road, (Note: Horrane was a station on the former Cecil Plains railway line. It was situated adjacent to the intersection of Toowoomba–Cecil Plains Road and Pampas–Horrane Road in the locality of Cecil Plains.) where it turns south. Note that many navigation systems will suggest a turn to the west in Cecil Plains, leading to Millmerran–Cecil Plains Road. State Route 82 follows Pampas–Horrane Road to Pampas, where it meets the Gore Highway at a T-junction. From there it follows the Gore Highway south-west to Millmerran, where it turns south on the Millmerran–Inglewood Road. This road continues south to Inglewood, where it meets the Cunningham Highway at a T-junction.

== History ==
In 1848, before Queensland became a separate State, the Chinchilla pastoral run was recorded in the New South Wales Lands Office. In 1878, when the Western railway line was being extended from Dalby, a construction camp was established at Charleys Creek. This soon became the town of Chinchilla, with a post office opening in 1878, the railway station in 1880, and a school in 1883. In the early 1900s the development of small farms was actively encouraged.

The next three localities on the road to the east from Chinchilla were first settled as pastoral runs. Canaga pastoral run was taken up in the early 1850s, and in 1853 was transferred to members of the Bell family, the owners of Jimbour Station. Jinghi Jinghi pastoral run, which existed in 1849, is believed to have been part of Jimbour. The Darr pastoral run was established in the early 1850s.

From its inception in 1842, Jimbour grew to be a massive collection of pastoral runs through purchase of nearby leases. At its peak it occupied 222,000 acres (90,000 ha) across the Western Downs. In 1877, 40,000 acres (16,000 ha) of land was resumed to establish smaller farms. The location of these is unknown, but some may have been along the road from Chinchilla to Durong. Farms and villages were eventually established along the road, with Canaga opening a school in 1911, Jinghi in 1915 and Darr Creek in 1922. Durong also opened its first school in 1923.

Burrandowan pastoral run was established in 1843 on land that is now part of Durong and part of Ballogie. In 1910 sections of land resumed from Burrandowan were offered for sale.

Wondai was first settled in the 1850s, with closer settlement in the early 1900s. The first school opened in 1905. Tingoora was established in 1900 and the railway arrived in 1904, the year in which farm allotments were advertised for sale nearby. Little is known of the early history of the localities between Ballogie and Tingoora, except that Cushnie opened its first school in 1906.

Early roads to the east of Chinchilla were cut to enable access to the pastoral runs. With the advent of small farms and villages came a need for better roads. There was never any plan for a rail link between Chinchilla and Wondai, so road building and improvement became a necessity.

== Major intersections ==
All distances are from Google Maps.

LGA	Location	km	mi	Destinations	Notes
Western Downs	Chinchilla	0	0.0	Warrego Highway – east – Dalby – west – Miles	Western end of Chinchilla–Wondai Road (no shield)
Western Downs	Jinghi	47.9	29.8	Jandowae Connection Road – south – Jandowae	Road turns north as State Route 82.
South Burnett	Durong	89.3	55.5	Mundubbera–Durong Road – north – Boondooma, Mundubbera	Road continues east
South Burnett	Tingoora	151.6	94.2	Bunya Highway – north – Wondai – south – Wooroolin, Kingaroy	Eastern end of Chinchilla–Wondai Road (State Route 82). The town of Wondai is about 8 kilometres (5.0 mi) north-east of the intersection.
1.000 mi = 1.609 km; 1.000 km = 0.621 mi: Route transition

== See also ==
- List of road routes in Queensland
- List of numbered roads in Queensland
