= Meringandan =

- Suburb
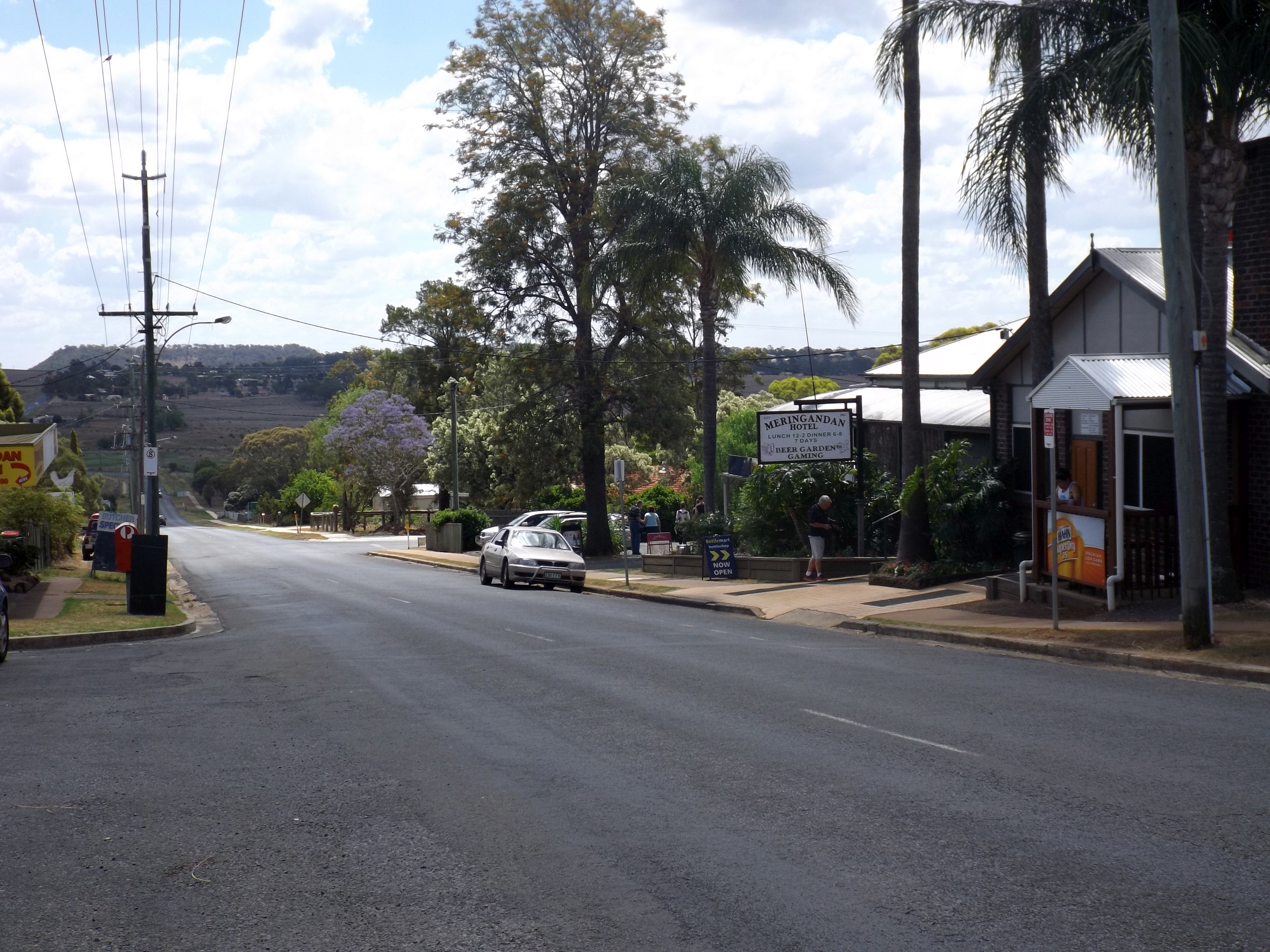
- Main Street, 2014

- Interactive map of Meringandan
- Coordinates: 27.4027°S 151.9211°E
- Country: Australia
- State: Queensland
- LGA: Toowoomba Region
- Location: 4.8 km (3.0 mi) NW of Highfields; 19.2 km (11.9 mi) N of Toowoomba CBD; 145 km (90 mi) W of Brisbane
- Established: 1868

Government
  - State electorates: Condamine; Toowoomba North
  - Federal division: Groom

Area
  - Total: 23.3 km^{2} (9.0 sq mi)

Population
  - Total: 530 (2021 census)
  - Density: 22.75/km^{2} (58.9/sq mi)
- Time zone: UTC+10:00 (AEST)
- Postcode: 4352
Suburbs around Meringandan
Muniganeen	Douglas	Groomsville
Meringandan West	Meringandan	Kleinton
Meringandan West	Woolmer	Highfields

Meringandan is a rural locality in the Toowoomba Region, Queensland, Australia. In the 2021 census, Meringandan had a population of 530 people.

== Geography ==
The locality is on the Darling Downs near Highfields, 19 kilometres (12 mi) NNW of Toowoomba.

It is drained by the meandering Meringandan Creek, which forms most of the boundary with Meringandan West.

== History ==
Meringandan is a corruption of the aboriginal words, Moorin meaning fire and Gandan meaning clay. Therefore, Meringandan means 'place of fire and clay'.

Meringandan was once part of the Gowrie pastoral station, established in 1841. The district was opened to closer settlement in the 1870s with many Germans settling there.

About 1875, the German settlers established a Lutheran church. St Gregory's Anglican Church was established in 1886. A Congregational Church opened in 1909. A Church of Christ opened in 1919.

Meringandan State School opened on 24 January 1876. It was built in 1875 by Jack Maag. Isaac John Thomas was appointed the first head teacher of the school. The enrolment for that year was 80 pupils. It is now within the suburb boundaries of Meringandan West.

A branch railway line was constructed from Toowoomba to Cabarlah, and the first train ran in September 1883. As Meringandan had a railway station, the settlers in the Goombungee and Haden areas used it to forward their goods. Most farmers did their carting, but well-known carriers were Jack Wieck, Herman Lau, George Klein and Jack Lange. In the early 1900s, a line of teams stretching for half a mile, waiting to load or unload at the railway station, was a familiar sight. However, the construction of the Haden railway line to Haden in 1910 reduced the need to use Meringandan's railway station; meanwhile, the use of motor transport was increasing. Following the closure of the railway yards, the railway station was replaced with a park.

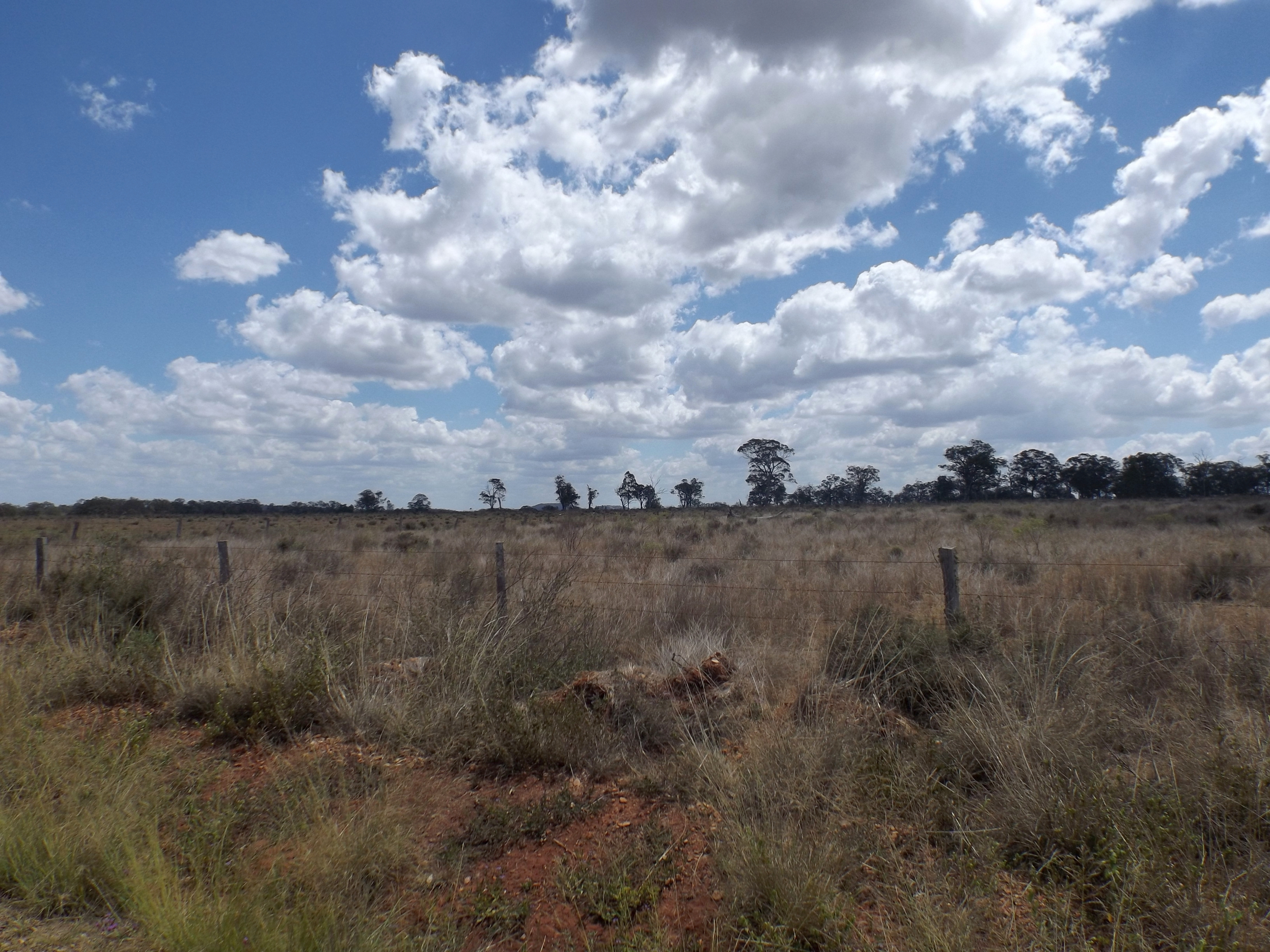
Fields along Cooby Dam Road, 2014

St Gregory's Anglican Church was consecrated on Sunday, 12 September 1886 by Bishop William Webber. It was located on a 1-acre (0.40 ha) piece of land near the railway station, donated by Mr Foland. Mr Maag built it, and it was 18 by 38 feet (5.5 by 11.6 m) and could seat 150 people. In 1905, it was relocated to Kingsthorpe, where it was re-consecrated as St Gregory's by Archbishop St Clair Donaldson on 20 October 1905. It closed circa 1982.

On Sunday, 2 February 1896, a new Lutheran church opened, replacing the previous one that had become dilapidated over its quarter century of use. L. Goebel and Son of Gomoran built the new church. The church was 40 by 20 feet (12.2 by 6.1 m) with the vestry 12 by 14 feet (3.7 by 4.3 m) and the porch 7 by 8 feet (2.1 by 2.4 m) with 14 feet (4.3 m) high walls. Inside, there was an elevated cedar pulpit.

At the beginning of the 1900s, the Court House was moved from Cabarlah and erected at Meringandan.

Before 1900, the farmers' wives baked their bread, but early in the century, a bakery was established by O. Wuersching, the first baker employed being Walls.

Brigalow Park Provisional School opened on 17 October 1910. On 1 May 1912, it became Brigalow Park State School. It closed on 13 April 1962.

== Demographics ==
In the 2011 census, Meringandan had a population of 305 people.

In the 2016 census, Meringandan had a population of 487 people.

In the 2021 census, Meringandan had a population of 530 people.

== Education ==
There are no schools in Meringandan. The nearest government primary schools are Meringandan State School in neighbouring Meringandan West to the west, Geham State School in Geham to the east, and Highfields State School in Highfields to the south-east. The nearest government secondary school is Highfields State Secondary College in Highfields to the south-east.

== Amenities ==
Library services in Meringandan are provided by the Toowoomba Regional Council's mobile library service. The van visits Meringandan State School and Meringandan Produce Store every Thursday.
