= Crows Nest railway line =

Crows Nest Branch Railway was originally surveyed as a direct line from Toowoomba north to Crows Nest in Queensland, Australia. The branch eventually took a more circuitous route to cover the maximum amount of farming country. The first stage struck out from Pengarry Junction a short distance west of Toowoomba and continued via Birnan, Cawdor, Shirley, Woolmer, Meringandan and Kleinton to terminate at Cabarlah. It opened on 17 September 1883. Shortly after opening, a daily service was provided to Cabarlah.

The second stage of the line to Crows Nest was opened on 6 December 1886 and stops were located en route at Geham, Mt Luke, Taylor, Hampton and Pechey. The extension serviced sawmills in the Pechey and Perseverance regions with a siding at Hampton station connecting to the Munro Tramway servicing Palmtree, Perseverance and Ravensbourne.

Until about 1930, a daily mixed train departed Crows Nest at 7.00am each morning except Sunday for the 3 1/2-hour trip to Toowoomba. A rail motor service then took over which cut the travel time to a little over 1 1/2 hours. The branch was relegated to goods trains only during the mid-1950s and closed completely on 1 July 1961.

== See also ==
- Rail transport in Queensland
