= Merritts Creek, Queensland =

Merritts Creek
- Suburb
- Interactive map of Merritts Creek
- Coordinates: 27.3505°S 152.0319°E
- Country: Australia
- State: Queensland
- LGA: Toowoomba Region
- Location: 12.0 km (7.5 mi) SSW of Crows Nest; 17.4 km (10.8 mi) NE of Highfields; 29.6 km (18.4 mi) NNE of Toowoomba CBD; 145 km (90 mi) W of Brisbane

Government
  - State electorate: Condamine
  - Federal division: Groom

Area
  - Total: 13.5 km^{2} (5.2 sq mi)

Population
  - Total: 102 (2021 census)
  - Density: 7.56/km^{2} (19.57/sq mi)
- Time zone: UTC+10:00 (AEST)
- Postcode: 4352
Suburbs around Merritts Creek
Groomsville	Pechey	Pechey
Geham	Merritts Creek	Hampton
Geham	Mount Luke	Hampton

Merritts Creek is a rural locality in the Toowoomba Region, Queensland, Australia. In the 2021 census, Merritts Creek had a population of 102 people.

== Geography ==
Taylor railway station is a former railway station on the now-closed Crows Nest railway line on the eastern side of Taylor Station Road (27.36526°S 152.03795°E).

== History ==
The second stage of the Crows Nest railway line from Cabarlah to Crows Nest was opened on 6 December 1886 with the Merrits Creek area being served by the Tayor railway station. The line closed on 1 July 1961.

== Demographics ==
In the 2016 census, Merritts Creek had a population of 88 people.

In the 2021 census, Merritts Creek had a population of 102 people.

== Education ==
There are no schools in Merritts Creek. The nearest government primary schools are Geham State School in neighbouring Geham to the south-west and Crow's Nest State School in Crows Nest to the north. The nearest government secondary schools are Crow's Nest State School (to Year 10) in Crows Nest and Highfields State Secondary College (to Year 12) in Highfields to the south.
