= Muniganeen, Queensland =

Muniganeen
- Suburb
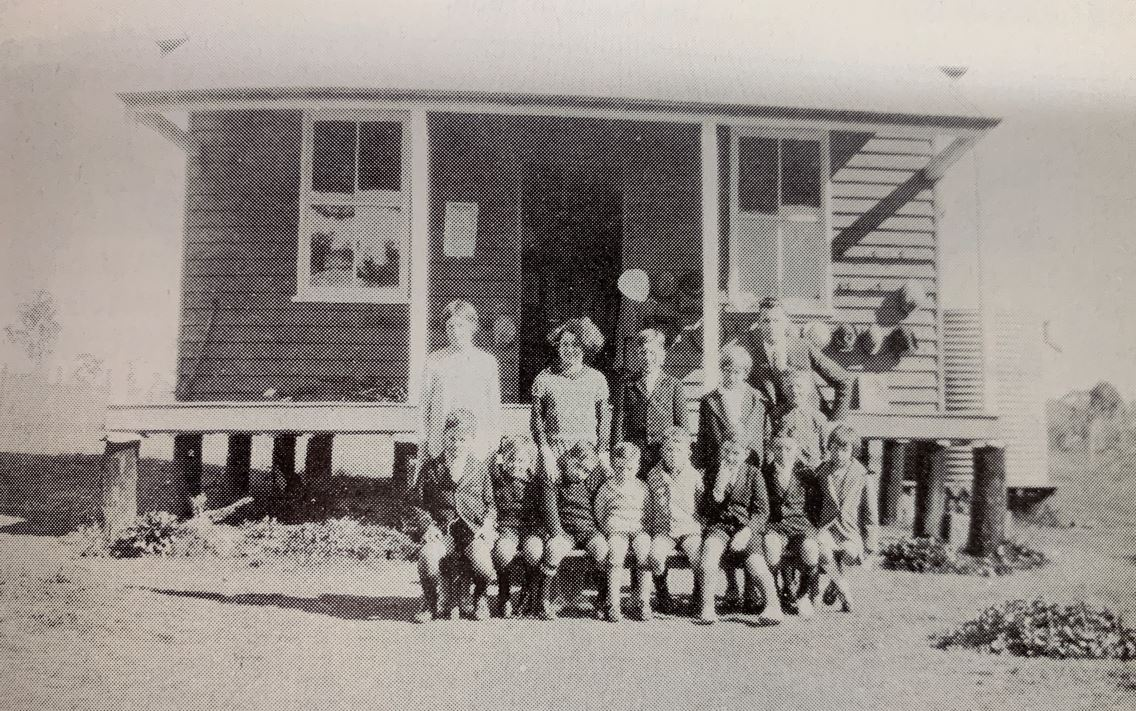
- Muniganeen State School (1904-1950)

- Interactive map of Muniganeen
- Coordinates: 27.3780°S 151.8744°E
- Country: Australia
- State: Queensland
- LGA: Toowoomba Region
- Location: 14.0 km (8.7 mi) NNW of Highfields; 27.2 km (16.9 mi) NNW of Toowoomba CBD; 152 km (94 mi) W of Brisbane

Government
  - State electorate: Condamine
  - Federal division: Groom

Area
  - Total: 18.2 km^{2} (7.0 sq mi)

Population
  - Total: 40 (2021 census)
  - Density: 2.20/km^{2} (5.7/sq mi)
- Time zone: UTC+10:00 (AEST)
- Postcode: 4352
Suburbs around Muniganeen
Boodua	Goombungee	Douglas
Boodua	Muniganeen	Meringandan
Yalangur	Meringandan West	Meringandan West

Muniganeen is a rural locality in the Toowoomba Region, Queensland, Australia. In the 2021 census, Muniganeen had a population of 40 people.

== Geography ==
The locality is bounded to the east by Meringandan Creek and to the west by Oakey Creek. The elevation ranges from 430 to 560 metres (1,410 to 1,840 ft) above sea level.

The locality presumably takes its name from Mount Muniganeen (27.40036°S 151.87192°E) which lies just south of the locality.

The land use is a mixture of grazing on native vegetation on the higher elevations and crop growing on the lower elevations.

== History ==
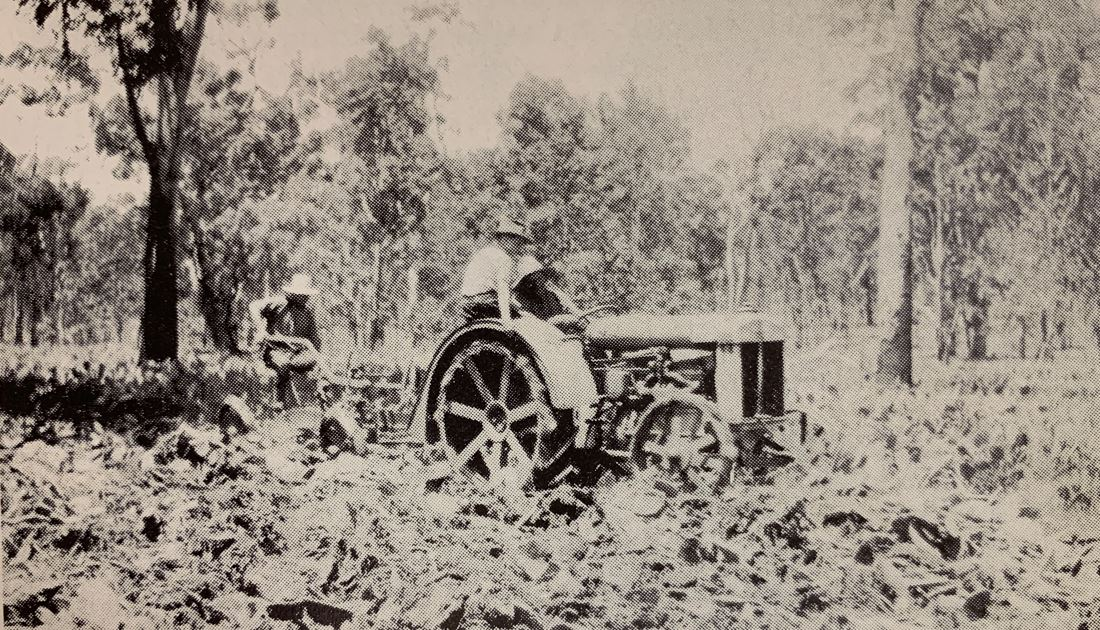
Clearing the Muniganeen school grounds of prickly pear

Muniganeen Provisional School opened on 1 August 1904 under head teacher Maria Kelly. On 1 January 1909, it became Muniganeen State School. Prickly pear had to be cleared by the parents several times a year or else access to the school was blocked. The school closed on 22 June 1924 due to low student numbers but reopened on 25 May 1926. It closed on 26 July 1950, and was permanently closed on 31 July 1950. It was on a 3-acre (1.2 ha) site at 74 Muniganeen Road on the north-western corner with Boodua Muniganeen Road (27.37422°S 151.86996°E), originally part of the Gowrie Homestead. The school building was relocated to the Goombungee Showgrounds where it was used as a catering facility.

== Demographics ==
In the 2016 census, Muniganeen had a population of 59 people.

In the 2021 census, Muniganeen had a population of 40 people.

== Education ==
There are no schools in Muniganeen. The nearest government primary schools are Goombungee State School in neighbouring Goombungee to the north and Meringandan State School in neighbouring Meringandan West to the south-east. The nearest government secondary school is Highfields State Secondary College in Highfields to the south-east.
