= Mount Luke, Queensland =

Mount Luke
- Suburb
- Interactive map of Mount Luke
- Coordinates: 27.3891°S 152.0411°E
- Country: Australia
- State: Queensland
- LGA: Toowoomba Region
- Location: 17.8 km (11.1 mi) NE of Highfields; 30.0 km (18.6 mi) NNE of Toowoomba CBD; 144 km (89 mi) W of Brisbane

Government
  - State electorate: Condamine
  - Federal division: Groom

Area
  - Total: 8.9 km^{2} (3.4 sq mi)

Population
  - Total: 51 (2021 census)
  - Density: 5.73/km^{2} (14.84/sq mi)
- Time zone: UTC+10:00 (AEST)
- Postcode: 4352
Suburbs around Mount Luke
Geham	Merritts Creek	Hampton
Geham	Mount Luke	Hampton
Geham	Fifteen Mile	Fifteen Mile

Mount Luke is a rural locality in the Toowoomba Region, Queensland, Australia. In the 2021 census, Mount Luke had a population of 51 people.

== Geography ==
The Geham State Forest and Geham National Park are in the north of the locality. The state forest extends into neighbouring Merritts Creek.

== Demographics ==
In the 2016 census, Mount Luke had a population of 42 people.

In the 2021 census, Mount Luke had a population of 51 people.

== Education ==
There are no schools in Mount Luke. The nearest government primary schools are Geham State School in neighbouring Geham to the south-west and Murphy's Creek State School in Murphys Creek to the south. The nearest government secondary school is Highfields State Secondary College in Highfields to the south-west.
