= Woolmer, Queensland =

Woolmer
- Suburb
- Interactive map of Woolmer
- Coordinates: 27.4494°S 151.9194°E
- Country: Australia
- State: Queensland
- LGA: Toowoomba Region
- Location: 8.9 km (5.5 mi) W of Highfields; 17.9 km (11.1 mi) N of Toowoomba CBD; 143 km (89 mi) W of Brisbane

Government
  - State electorate: Toowoomba North
  - Federal division: Groom

Area
  - Total: 4.5 km^{2} (1.7 sq mi)

Population
  - Total: 38 (2021 census)
  - Density: 8.44/km^{2} (21.9/sq mi)
- Time zone: UTC+10:00 (AEST)
- Postcode: 4352
Suburbs around Woolmer
Meringandan West	Meringandan	Highfields
Cawdor	Woolmer	Highfields
Cawdor	Cawdor	Highfields

Woolmer is a rural locality in the Toowoomba Region, Queensland, Australia. In the 2021 census, Woolmer had a population of 38 people.

== Geography ==
Old Goombungee Road forms the western boundary of the locality.

The land use is a mixture of crop growing, grazing on native vegetation, and rural residential housing.

== History ==
The Crows Nest railway line opened from Toowoomba to Cabarlah in 1883 and was extended to Crows Nest in 1886. Woolmer was served by the Woolmer railway station (approx 27.44422°S 151.91387°E) and Shirley railway station (27.4544°S 151.9091°E) which was named after the town of Shirley in Warwickshire, England. The line closed on 1 July 1961.

== Demographics ==
In the 2016 census, Woolmer had a population of 34 people.

In the 2021 census, Woolmer had a population of 38 people.

== Education ==
There are no schools in Woolmer. The nearest government primary schools are Meringandan State School in neighbouring Meringandan West to the north-west and Highfields State School in neighbouring Highfields to the east. The nearest government secondary school is Highfields State Secondary College in Highfields. There are also non-government primary and secondary schools in Highfields.

Highfields Christian College in Kearneys Spring is planning a 100-acre (40 ha) campus at 173 Woolmer Road in Woolmer. Operations at the new campus are expected to commence in 2027 with a staged transition to be completed by 2036.
