= Fifteen Mile, Queensland =

Fifteen Mile
- Suburb
- Interactive map of Fifteen Mile
- Coordinates: 27.4130°S 152.05°E
- Country: Australia
- State: Queensland
- LGA: Lockyer Valley Region
- Location: 28.8 km (17.9 mi) NE of Toowoomba; 44.3 km (27.5 mi) NW of Gatton; 134 km (83 mi) W of Brisbane

Government
  - State electorate: Lockyer
  - Federal division: Wright

Area
  - Total: 17.0 km^{2} (6.6 sq mi)
- Elevation: 286–615 m (938–2,018 ft)

Population
  - Total: 37 (2021 census)
  - Density: 2.18/km^{2} (5.64/sq mi)
- Time zone: UTC+10:00 (AEST)
- Postcode: 4352
Suburbs around Fifteen Mile
Geham	Mount Luke	Hampton
Geham	Fifteen Mile	White Mountain
Cabarlah	Murphys Creek	Murphys Creek

Fifteen Mile is a rural locality in the Lockyer Valley Region, Queensland, Australia. In the 2021 census, Fifteen Mile had a population of 37 people.

== Geography ==
The locality presumably takes its name from the Fifteen Mile Creek which enters the locality from the west (Geham) and exits to the east (White Mountain).

The terrain is hilly, varying from 286 metres (938 ft) above sea level where the creek exits the locality to the east through to 615 metres (2,018 ft) in the west of the locality. The land use in the lower elevations in the east is grazing on native vegetation, while the higher elevations in the west of the locality are mostly undeveloped bushland with a number of rural residential properties on the highest areas in the west.

== Demographics ==
In the 2016 census, Fifteen Mile had a population of 33 people.

In the 2021 census, Fifteen Mile had a population of 37 people.

== Education ==
There are no schools in Fifteen Mile. The nearest government primary schools are Geham State School in neighbouring Geham to the north-west and Murphy's Creek State School in neighbouring Murphys Creek to the south. The nearest government secondary school is Highfields State Secondary College in Highfields to the south-west.
