= Kleinton, Queensland =

Kleinton
- Suburb
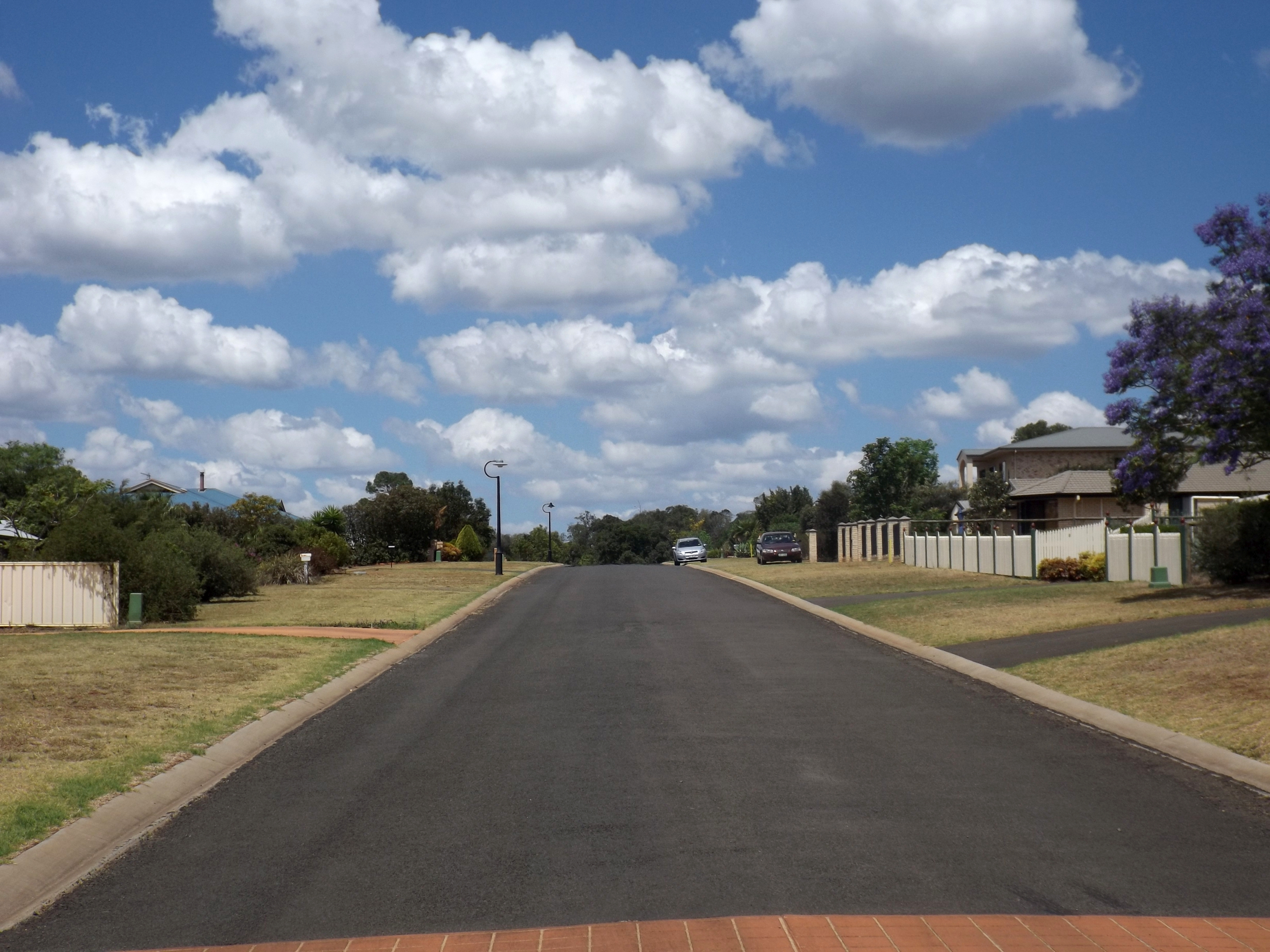
- Charmaine Court, 2014

- Interactive map of Kleinton
- Coordinates: 27.4188°S 151.955°E
- Country: Australia
- State: Queensland
- LGA: Toowoomba Region
- Location: 2.2 km (1.4 mi) N of Highfields; 16.9 km (10.5 mi) N of Toowoomba CBD; 145 km (90 mi) W of Brisbane

Government
  - State electorates: Condamine; Toowoomba North
  - Federal division: Groom

Area
  - Total: 14.2 km^{2} (5.5 sq mi)

Population
  - Total: 2,205 (2021 census)
  - Density: 155.3/km^{2} (402.2/sq mi)
- Time zone: UTC+10:00 (AEST)
- Postcode: 4352
Suburbs around Kleinton
Groomsville	Groomsville	Geham
Meringandan	Kleinton	Cabarlah
Meringandan	Highfields	Cabarlah

Kleinton is a rural locality in the Toowoomba Region, Queensland, Australia. In the 2021 census, Kleinton had a population of 2,205 people.

== Geography ==
Kleinton is on the Darling Downs.

The area contains three bands of separate land use types. In the south rural residential blocks have been established as an extension of the urban sprawl of Highfields to the south. The central area remain vegetated and undeveloped. The northern boundary is aligned with the southern extent of Cooby Dam. This area remains undeveloped but has been cleared of vegetation.

== History ==
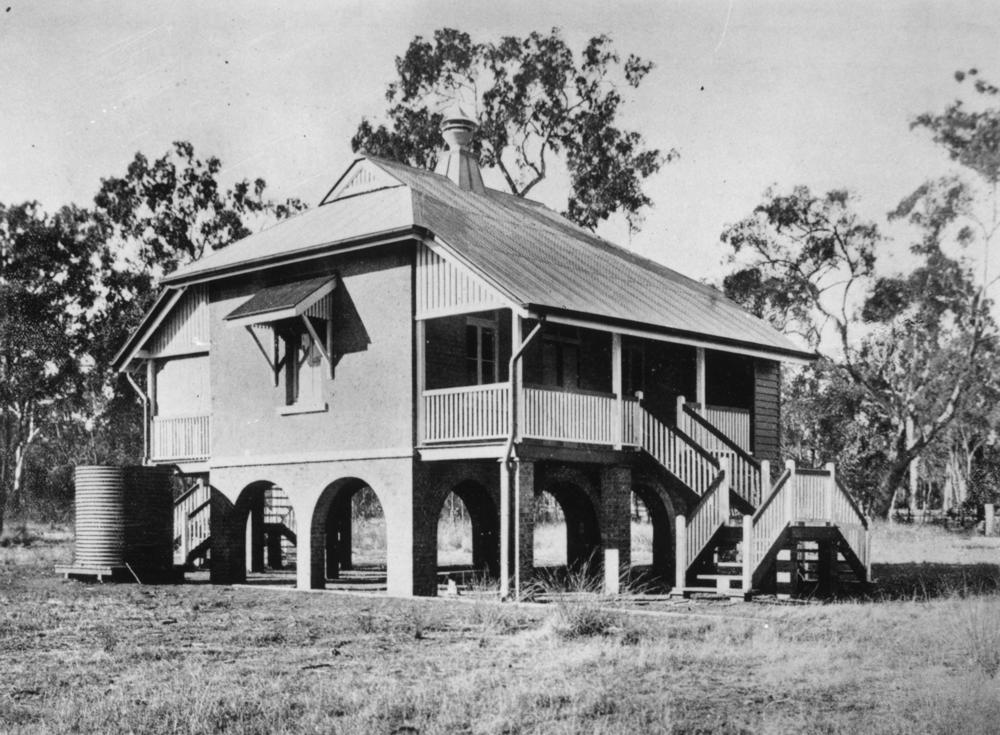
Kleinton State School, 1910

The locality was named after early selector Michael Klein who was shot dead at Highfields in February 1870 by James Alexander Herlich following a dispute.

The Crows Nest railway line, which operated between 1883 and 1961, had a stop at Kleinton.

Kleinton State School opened on 20 February 1911 on a 2-acre (0.81 ha) site donated by the Brazier family who also owned the local brickworks.The school is believed to be Queensland's oldest one-teacher school built with brick. The school closed in December 1970. In 1975, the Amaroo Environmental Education Centre opened in the former school building.

== Demographics ==
In the 2016 census, Kleinton had a population of 1,617 people.

In the 2021 census, Kleinton had a population of 2,205 people.

== Education ==
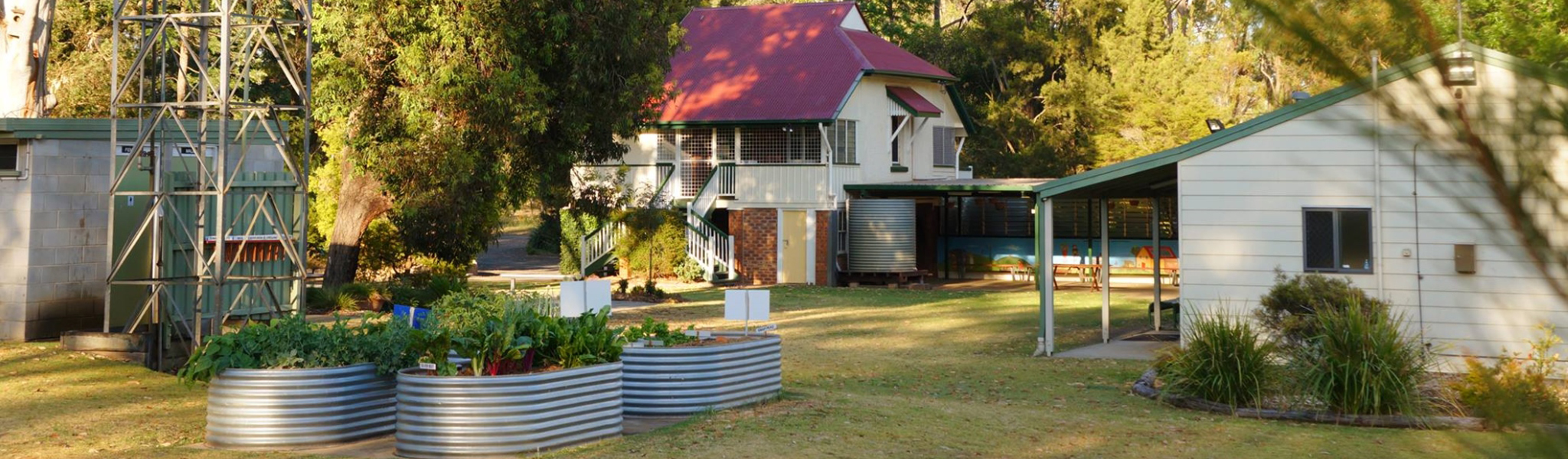
Amaroo Environmental Education Centre, operating from the old Kleinton State School

Amaroo Environmental Education Centre is an Outdoor and Environmental Education Centre at 90 Kleinton School Road (27.4249°S 151.9453°E).

There are no primary or secondary schools in Kleinton. The nearest government primary schools are Highfields State School in neighbouring Highfields to the south, Meringandan State School in Meringandan West to the west, and Geham State School in neighbouring Geham to the north-east. The nearest government secondary school is Highfields State Secondary College in Highfields.
