= Kelvinhaugh, Queensland =

Kelvinhaugh
- Suburb
- Interactive map of Kelvinhaugh
- Coordinates: 27.3891°S 151.7686°E
- Country: Australia
- State: Queensland
- LGA: Toowoomba Region
- Location: 9.7 km (6.0 mi) NE of Oakey; 32.8 km (20.4 mi) NW of Toowoomba CBD; 156 km (97 mi) W of Brisbane

Government
  - State electorate: Condamine
  - Federal division: Groom

Area
  - Total: 42.2 km^{2} (16.3 sq mi)

Population
  - Total: 49 (2021 census)
  - Density: 1.161/km^{2} (3.01/sq mi)
- Time zone: UTC+10:00 (AEST)
- Postcode: 4401
Suburbs around Kelvinhaugh
Sabine; Greenwood	Silverleigh	Silverleigh
Devon Park	Kelvinhaugh	Boodua
Oakey	Oakey	Yalangur

Kelvinhaugh is a rural locality in the Toowoomba Region, Queensland, Australia. In the 2021 census, Kelvinhaugh had a population of 49 people.

== Geography ==
The Oakey–Cooyar Road enters the locality from the south-west (Oakey) and forms the western boundary, exiting to the north-west (Sabine / Greenwood).

The land use is a mixture of grazing on native vegetation and crop growing.

== History ==
Mayburn Provisional School opened on 20 January 1905. On 1 January 1909, it became Mayburn State School. On 30 July 1926, it was renamed Kelvinhaugh State School. It closed on 30 October 1952. It was at 133 Wilthorn Kelvinhaugh Road (27.4013°S 151.7680°E).

The Cooyar railway line opened from Oakey to Kulpi (then known as Rosalie) on 29 April 1912. The Kelvinhaugh area was served by the Wilthorn railway station was on the north-east corner of the Oakey Cooyar Road and the Wilthorn Kelvinhaugh Road (27.3930°S 151.7199°E). The name Wilthorn was created from name of the local Member of the Queensland Legislative Assembly, William Thorn. The line was closed on 8 December 1969.

== Demographics ==
In the 2016 census, Kelvinhaugh had a population of 44 people.

In the 2021 census, Kelvinhaugh had a population of 49 people.

== Education ==
There are no schools in Kelvinhaugh. The nearest government primary schools are Oakey State School in neighbouring Oakey to the south, Kingsthorpe State School in Kingsthorpe to the south-east, and Goombungee State School in Goombungee to the north-east. The nearest government secondary school is Oakey State High School in Oakey to the south. There is also a Catholic primary school in Oakey.
