= Boodua, Queensland =

Boodua
- Suburb
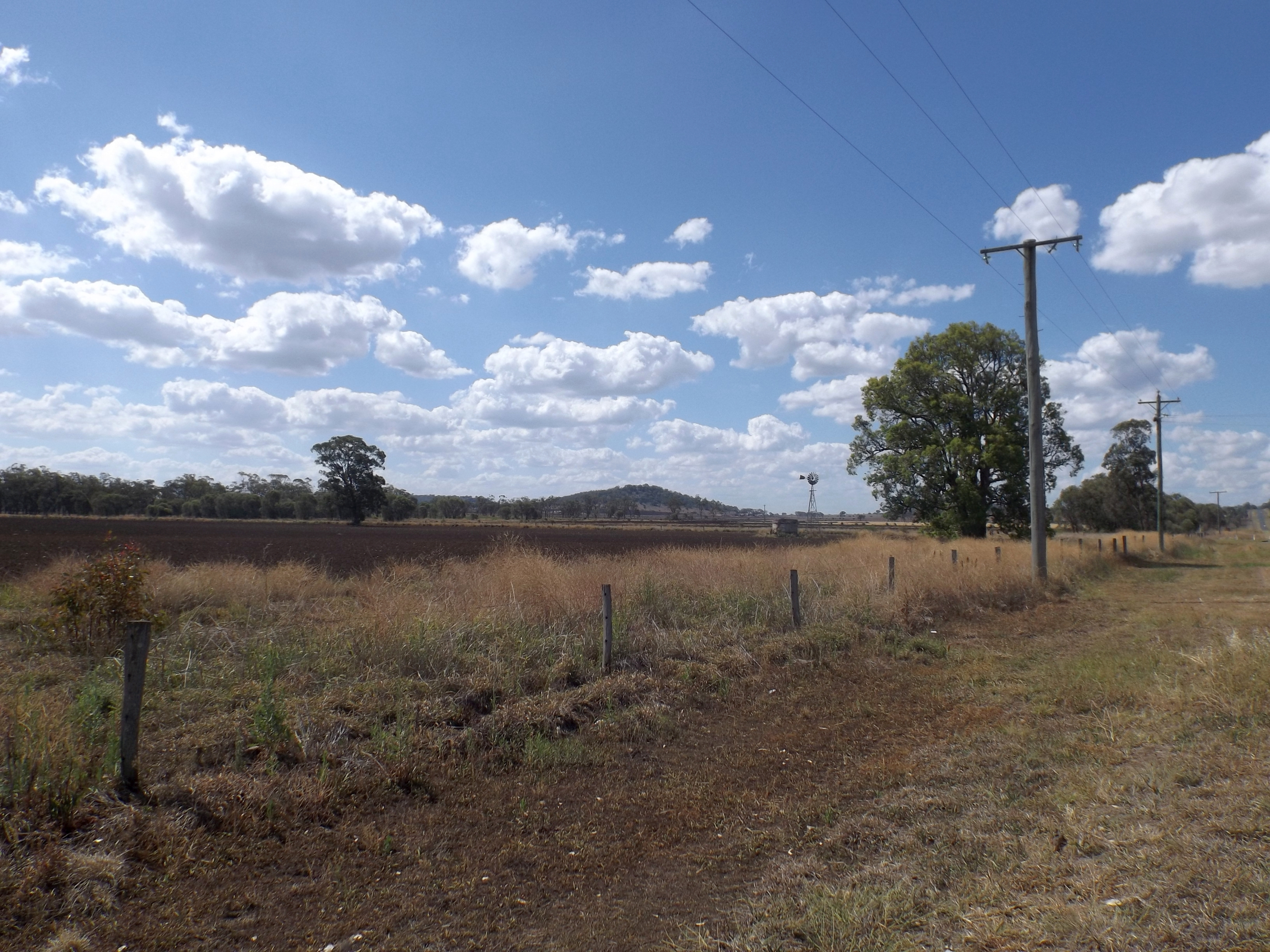
- Fields along Kingsthorpe Haden Road

- Interactive map of Boodua
- Coordinates: 27.3777°S 151.8266°E
- Country: Australia
- State: Queensland
- LGA: Toowoomba Region
- Location: 19.0 km (11.8 mi) NW of Highfields; 20.6 km (12.8 mi) NE of Oakey; 30.8 km (19.1 mi) NNW of Toowoomba CBD; 155 km (96 mi) W of Brisbane

Government
  - State electorate: Condamine
  - Federal division: Groom

Area
  - Total: 24.4 km^{2} (9.4 sq mi)

Population
  - Total: 95 (2021 census)
  - Density: 3.893/km^{2} (10.08/sq mi)
- Time zone: UTC+10:00 (AEST)
- Postcode: 4401
Suburbs around Boodua
Silverleigh	Goombungee	Muniganeen
Silverleigh; Kelvinhaugh	Boodua	Muniganeen
Kelvinhaugh	Yalangur	Yalangur

Boodua is a rural locality in the Toowoomba Region, Queensland, Australia. In the 2021 census, Boodua had a population of 95 people.

== Geography ==
Part of the eastern and southern boundary of Boodua follows Oakey Creek, a tributary of the Condamine River. The predominant land use is agriculture.

== History ==
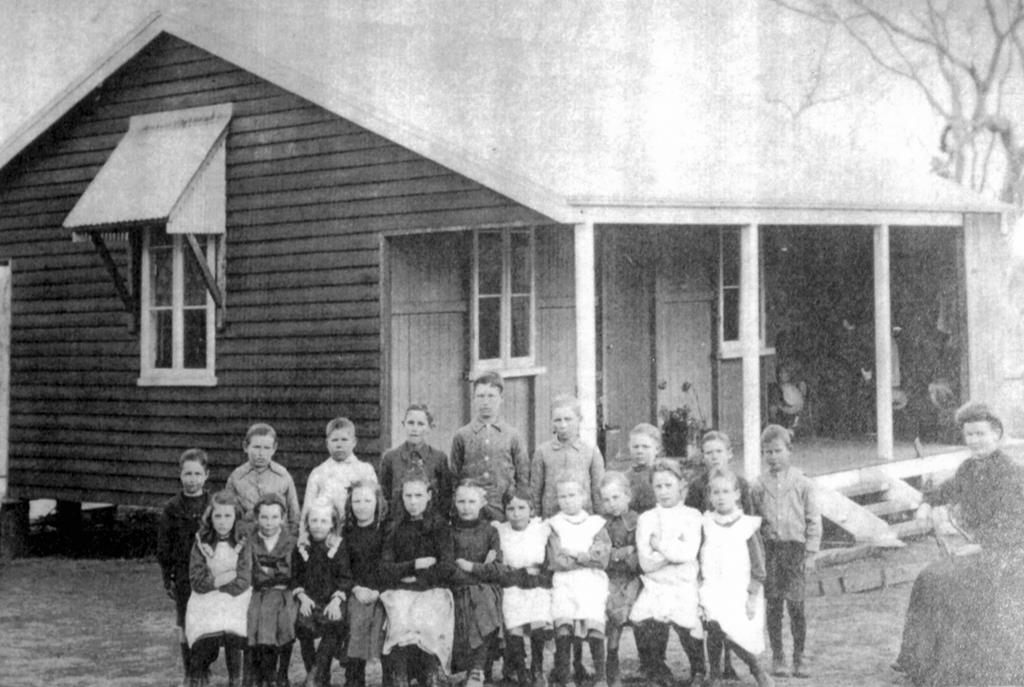
Boodua State School (formerly East Lynne State School)

The name originates from the Boodua railway station on the Haden railway line and is an Aboriginal word for a species of hawk.

East Lynne Provisional School opened on 1 October 1908. On 1 January 1909 it became East Lynne State School. In 1926, it was renamed Boodua State School. It closed on 29 January 1963. It was at 5 Boodua West Road (27.3745°S 151.8307°E).

The Boodua Public Hall opened in 1909. It was originally known as the East Lynne Hall.

On Sunday 14 September 1913 the East Lynne Methodist Church was officially opened by Reverend W. Goddard of Toowoomba. It was 20 by 30 feet (6.1 by 9.1 m) and was built near the railway line near Boodua railway station, next door to the state school and the public hall (approx 27.3741°S 151.8307°E). In 1977, as part of the creation of the Uniting Church in Australia, the East Lynne Methodist congregation merged with the Goombungee Congregational Church to form the Goombungee Uniting Church (which closed on 26 August 2012). The East Lynne Methodist Church no longer exists.

The Darling Downs Co-operative Dairy Association operated a cheese factory at Boodua between 1926 and 1950.

The area was once part of the Shire of Rosalie until it was merged into the Toowoomba Region in 2008.

== Demographics ==
In the 2016 census, Boodua had a population of 93 people.

In the 2021 census, Boodua had a population of 95 people.

== Education ==
There are no schools in Boodua. The nearest government primary schools are Goombungee State School in neighbouring Goombungee to the north and Kingsthorpe State School in Kingsthorpe to the south. The nearest government secondary schools are Oakey State High School in Oakey to the south-west and Highfields State Secondary College in Highfields to the south-east.

== Amenities ==
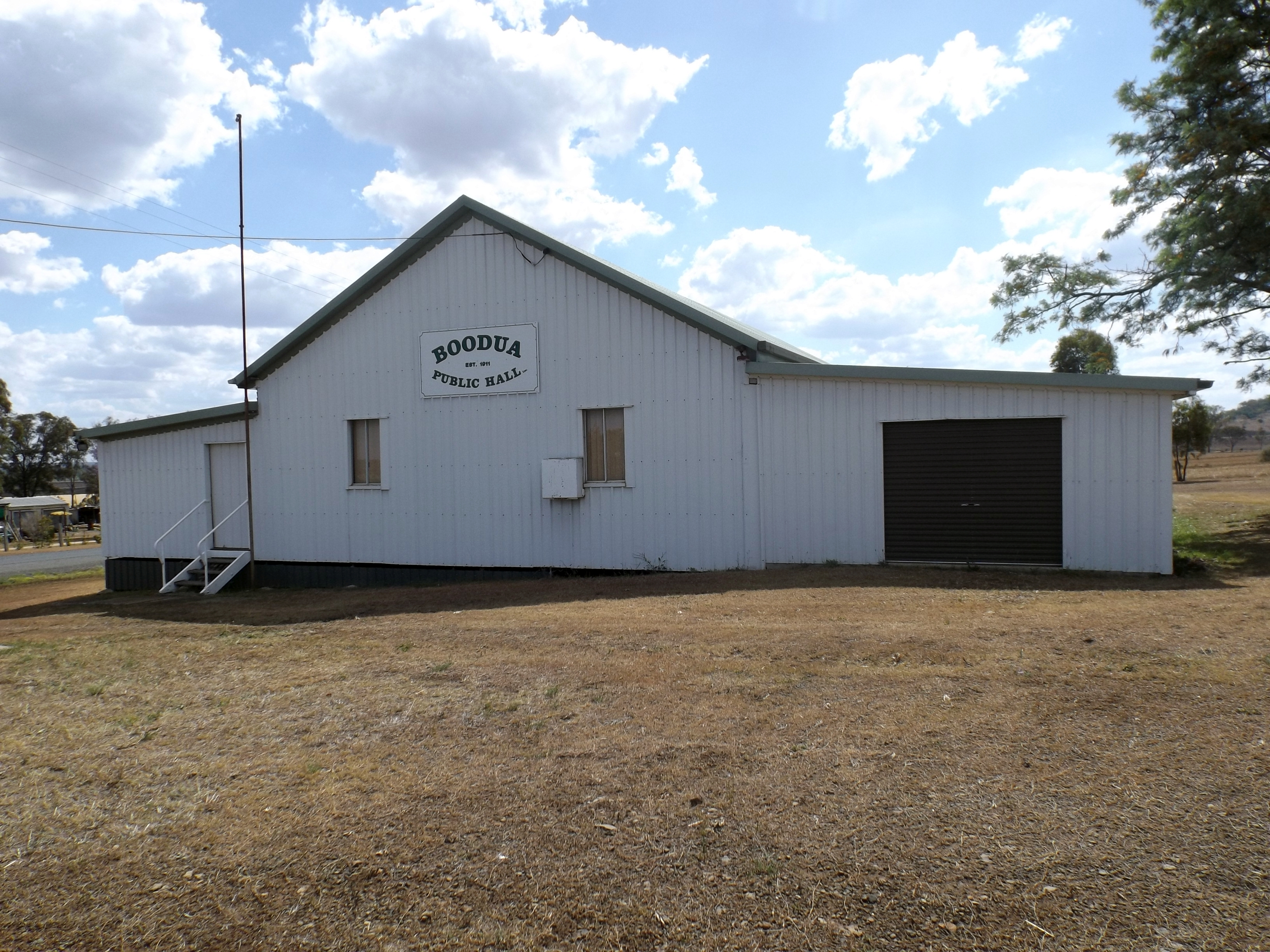
Boodua Public Hall, 2014

The Boodua Public Hall is at 1473 Kingsthorpe Haden Road (corner of Boodua West Road, 27.3739°S 151.8308°E).
