= Meringandan West, Queensland =

Meringandan West
- Suburb
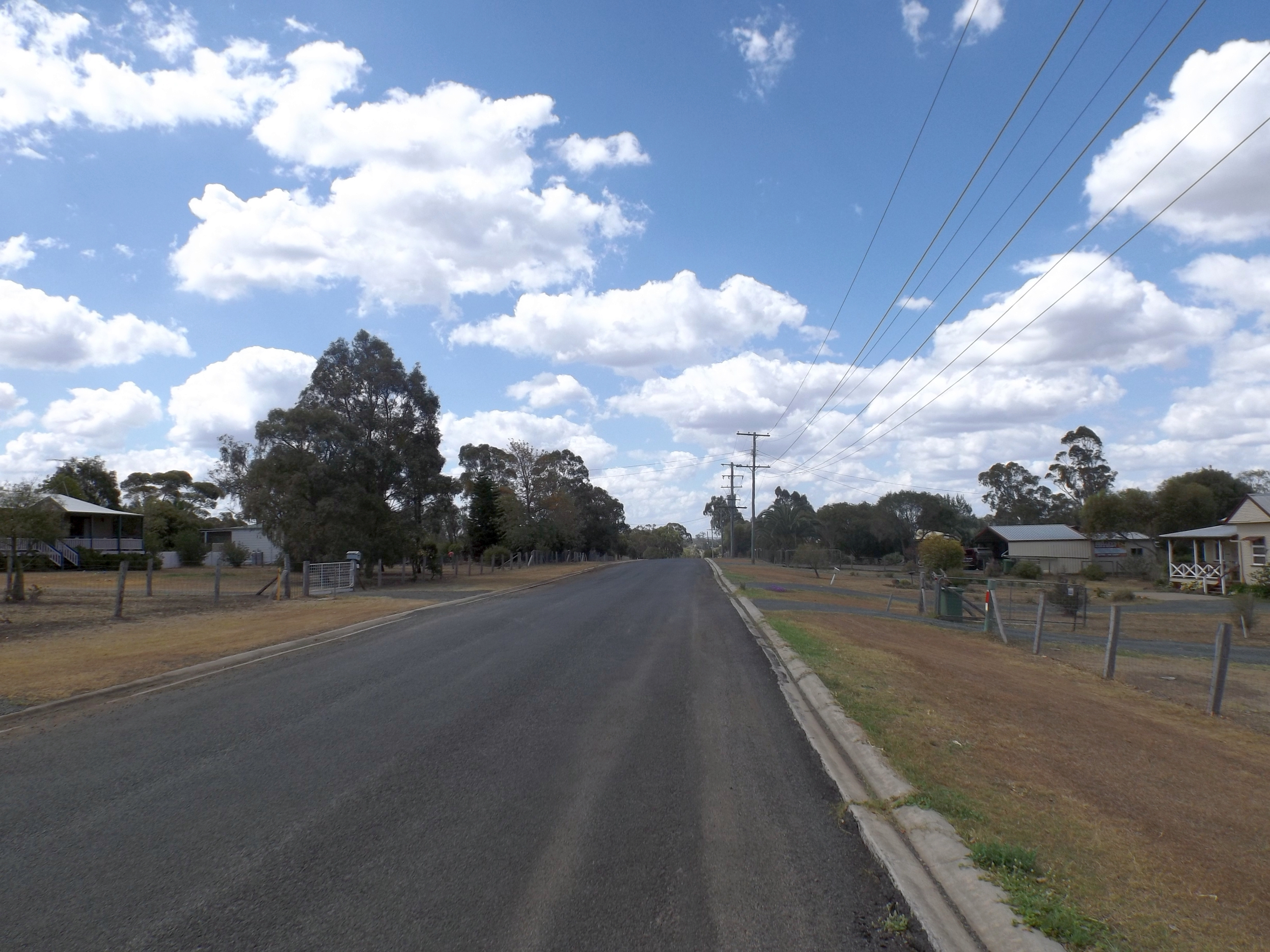
- Clifford Street, 2014

- Interactive map of Meringandan West
- Coordinates: 27.4166°S 151.8922°E
- Country: Australia
- State: Queensland
- LGA: Toowoomba Region
- Location: 8.6 km (5.3 mi) NW of Highfields; 22.8 km (14.2 mi) NNW of Toowoomba CBD; 146 km (91 mi) W of Brisbane

Government
  - State electorate: Condamine
  - Federal division: Groom

Area
  - Total: 16.6 km^{2} (6.4 sq mi)

Population
  - Total: 2,488 (2021 census)
  - Density: 149.9/km^{2} (388.2/sq mi)
- Time zone: UTC+10:00 (AEST)
- Postcode: 4352
Suburbs around Meringandan West
Muniganeen	Muniganeen	Meringandan
Yalangur; Gowrie Little Plain	Meringandan West	Meringandan
Lilyvale	Glencoe; Cawdor	Woolmer

Meringandan West is a rural locality in the Toowoomba Region, Queensland, Australia. In the 2021 census, Meringandan West had a population of 2,488 people.

== Geography ==
Meringandan West is on the Darling Downs in southern Queensland. The majority of the eastern boundary is aligned with Meringandan Creek, separating the locality from Meringandan. The creek also formed the boundary between the Shire of Crows Nest and the Shire of Rosalie) with Meringandan West falling under the jurisdiction of the Shire of Rosalie. In 2008, both Meringandan and Meringandan West both came under the jurisdiction of the newly created Toowoomba Region.

Mount Muniganeen is in the north-west of the locality (27.4006°S 151.8721°E) rising to 613 metres (2,011 ft) above sea level.

Central parts of the area have been developed into a residential estate. Meringandan West was part of a local planning scheme developed and adopted by the Toowoomba Region Council in August 2013.

== History ==
The name Meringandan is taken from the former railway station, which in turn is a Gooneburra word meaning red soil or broken clay.

Meringandan State School opened on 24 January 1876. It was built during 1875 by Jack Maag. Isaac John Thomas was appointed the first head teacher of the school. The enrolment for that year was 80 pupils. It is now within the suburb boundaries of Meringandan West.

The Meringandan Cemetery was surveyed on 13 October 1876. It was operated by local trustees until 2004, when control was passed to the Rosalie Shire Council 2005, and then to the Toowoomba Regional Council in 2008 following local government amalgamations.

== Demographics ==
In the 2016 census, Meringandan West had a population of 2,211 people.

In the 2021 census, Meringandan West had a population of 2,488 people.

== Education ==
Meringandan State School is a government primary (Prep-6) school for boys and girls at 10 School Road (27.4303°S 151.9050°E). In 2017, the school had an enrolment of 240 students with 20 teachers (15 full-time equivalent) and 14 non-teaching staff (8 full-time equivalent).

There are no secondary schools in Meringandan West. The nearest government secondary school is Highfields State Secondary College in Highfields to the south-east.

== Facilities ==
Lilyvale Oval was once used for an annual rodeo hosted by the P&C of Meringandan State School. The P&C also used to run Christmas Carols in the park, but they were also cancelled for lack of funding. Small church groups still used the park for annual carols nights.

Meringandan Cemetery is a 10-acre (4.0 ha) site on the eastern side of Peters Road (27.4225°S 151.8992°E). It is operated by the Toowoomba Regional Council.
