= Greenwood, Queensland =

Greenwood
- Suburb
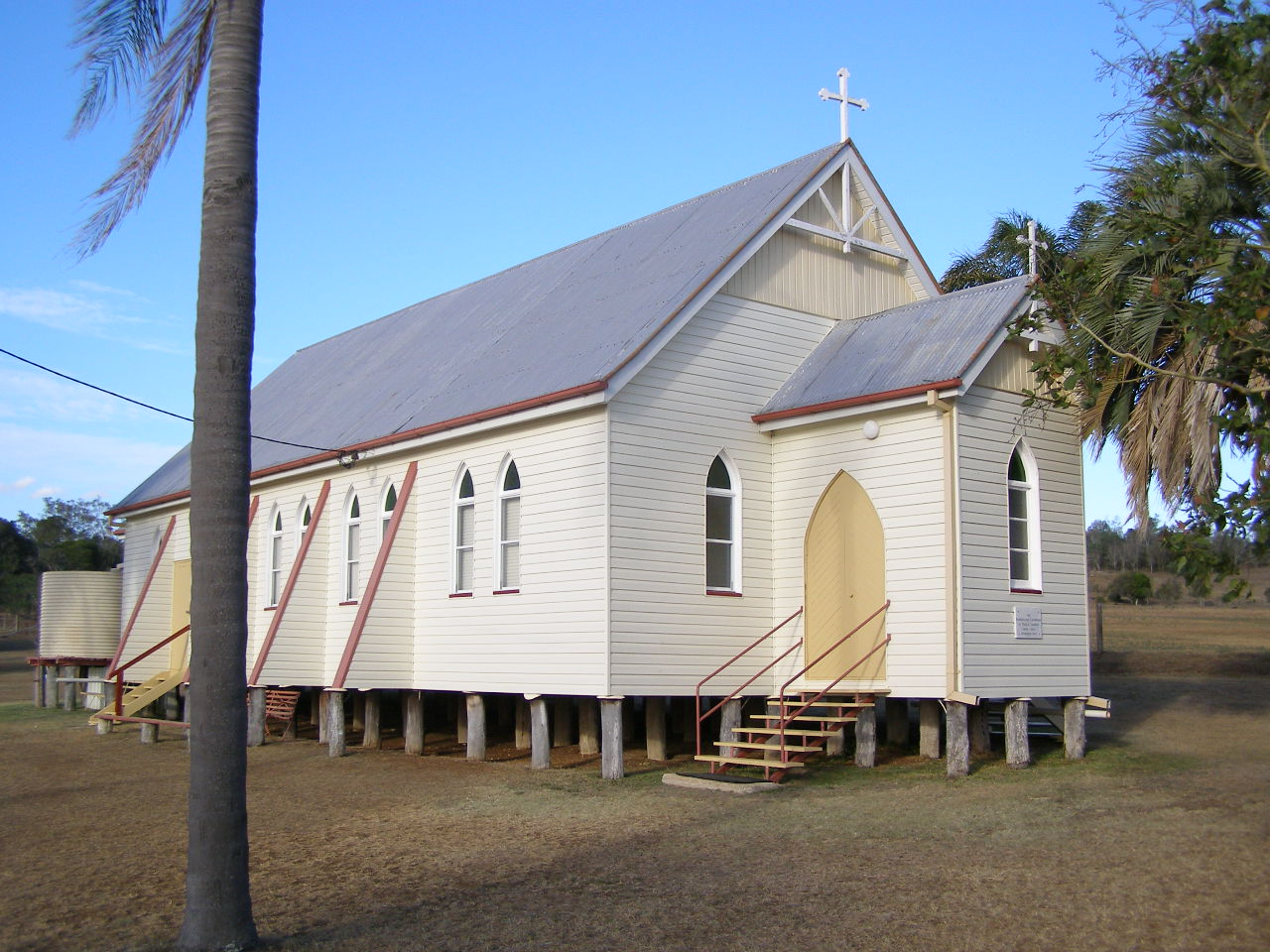
- St Paul's Lutheran Church, Greenwood, 2006

- Interactive map of Greenwood
- Coordinates: 27.3366°S 151.7397°E
- Country: Australia
- State: Queensland
- LGA: Toowoomba Region
- Location: 13.1 km (8.1 mi) N of Oakey; 40.6 km (25.2 mi) NW of Toowoomba CBD; 168 km (104 mi) W of Brisbane

Government
  - State electorate: Condamine
  - Federal division: Groom

Area
  - Total: 17.4 km^{2} (6.7 sq mi)

Population
  - Total: 34 (2021 census)
  - Density: 1.95/km^{2} (5.06/sq mi)
- Time zone: UTC+10:00 (AEST)
- Postcode: 4401
Suburbs around Greenwood
Acland	Silverleigh	Silverleigh
Acland	Greenwood	Silverleigh
Sabine	Kelvinhaugh	Kelvinhaugh

Greenwood is a rural locality in the Toowoomba Region, Queensland, Australia. In the 2021 census, Greenwood had a population of 34 people.

== Geography ==
The Oakey–Cooyar Road enters from the south-west (Sabine / Kelvinhaugh) and forms the south-west boundary of the locality before continuing north through the locality, exiting to the north (Silverleigh).

Greenwood has the following mountains:

- Boah Peak (27.3223°S 151.7540°E) rising to 532 metres (1,745 ft) above sea level
- Turkey Hill (27.3281°S 151.7378°E) 537 metres (1,762 ft)

The land is freehold and used for agriculture, predominantly crop growing with some grazing on native vegetation.

== History ==
A Lutheran congregation formed in 1899 and in November 1890 opened St Paul's Lutheran Church. In 1991, due to differences of opinion on religious issues, the church separated from the Lutheran Church of Australia and, in 1992, joined with a number of other like-minded Lutheran congregations to form the Australian Evangelical Lutheran Church.

The first Evangelical Lutheran Church in Queensland opened at Greenwood circa 1900. However, the Greenwood congregation outgrew the building so it was relocated to Yamsion to become its Evangelical Lutheran Church, where it was officially opened and dedicated on Thursday 18 May 1922.

Greenwood Provisional School opened in June 1907. On 1 January 1909, it became Greenwood State School. It closed in 1968. It was at 1091 Oakey Cooyar Road (corner of Greenwood School Road, 27.3379°S 151.7293°E).

Greenwood Methodist Church opened on 5 April 1959 at the top of the hill on Oakey-Cooyar Road, becoming the Greenwood Uniting Church after the 1977 amalgamation which formed the Uniting Church in Australia. In 1979, the Greenwood church building was relocated to Goombungee to become the Goombungee Uniting Church, while the former Goombungee Uniting Church became the church hall. On 26 August 2012, the former Greenwood church in Goombungee was decommissioned as a church and sold into private ownership.

== Demographics ==
In the 2016 census, Greenwood had a population of 40 people.

In the 2021 census, Greenwood had a population of 34 people.

== Education ==
There are no schools in Greenwood. The nearest government primary schools are Oakey State School in Oakey to the south and Goombungee State School in Goombungee to the north-east. The nearest government secondary school is Oakey State High School in Oakey to the south. There is also a Catholic primary school in Oakey.

== Amenities ==
Despite the name, St Paul's Lutheran Church, Greenwood, is at 617 Acland Silverleigh Road in Silverleigh (27.31461°S 151.74926°E).
