= Silverleigh, Queensland =

Silverleigh
- Suburb
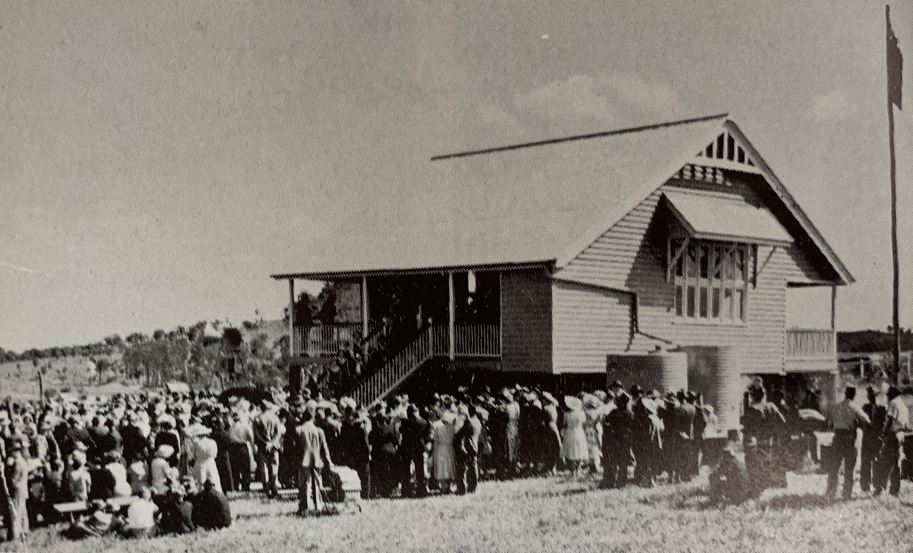
- Silverleigh State School jubilee, 1952

- Interactive map of Silverleigh
- Coordinates: 27.3333°S 151.7808°E
- Country: Australia
- State: Queensland
- LGA: Toowoomba Region
- Location: 17.0 km (10.6 mi) NNE of Oakey; 38.1 km (23.7 mi) NW of Toowoomba CBD; 162 km (101 mi) W of Brisbane

Government
  - State electorate: Condamine
  - Federal division: Groom

Area
  - Total: 46.6 km^{2} (18.0 sq mi)

Population
  - Total: 80 (2021 census)
  - Density: 1.72/km^{2} (4.45/sq mi)
- Time zone: UTC+10:00 (AEST)
- Postcode: 4401
Suburbs around Silverleigh
Acland	Highland Plains	Highland Plains
Greenwood	Silverleigh	Goombungee
Greenwood	Kelvinhaugh	Boodua

Silverleigh is a rural locality in the Toowoomba Region, Queensland, Australia. In the 2021 census, Silverleigh had a population of 80 people.

== Geography ==
The Oakey–Cooyar Road runs through the north-western corner.

== History ==
A Lutheran congregation formed in 1899 and in November 1890 opened St Paul's Lutheran Church. In 1991, due to differences of opinion on religious issues, the church separated from the Lutheran Church of Australia and, in 1992, joined with a number of other like-minded Lutheran congregations to form the Australian Evangelical Lutheran Church.

Local residents requested a school in 1901. Tenders were called to construct the school in May 1902. Boah Peak Provisional School opened on 8 September 1902 under head teacher Albert Amos Braysher. The school was renamed Silverleigh Provisional School in 1904. On 1 January 1909, it became Silverleigh State School. It closed on 4 June 1967. It was at 836 Acland Silverleigh Road (27.3172°S 151.7622°E).

== Demographics ==
In the 2016 census, Silverleigh had a population of 71 people.

In the 2021 census, Silverleigh had a population of 80 people.

== Education ==
There are no schools in Silverleigh. The nearest government primary schools are Goombungee State School in neighbouring Goombungee to the east and Oakey State School in Oakey to the south. The nearest government secondary school is Oakey State High School, also in Oakey. There is also a Catholic primary school in Oakey.

== Amenities ==
Despite the name, St Paul's Lutheran Church, Greenwood, is at 617 Acland Silverleigh Road in Silverleigh (27.31461°S 151.74926°E).
