= Cawdor, Queensland =

Cawdor
- Suburb
- Interactive map of Cawdor
- Coordinates: 27.4688°S 151.9147°E
- Country: Australia
- State: Queensland
- LGA: Toowoomba Region
- Location: 4.5 km (2.8 mi) SW of Highfields; 14.0 km (8.7 mi) N of Toowoomba CBD; 142 km (88 mi) W of Brisbane

Government
  - State electorates: Condamine; Toowoomba North
  - Federal division: Groom

Area
  - Total: 8.2 km^{2} (3.2 sq mi)

Population
  - Total: 420 (2021 census)
  - Density: 51.2/km^{2} (132.7/sq mi)
- Time zone: UTC+10:00 (AEST)
- Postcode: 4352
Suburbs around Cawdor
| Meringandan West | Meringandan West | Woolmer |
| Glencoe | Cawdor | Highfields |
| Gowrie Junction | Birnam | Highfields |

Cawdor is a rural locality in the Toowoomba Region, Queensland, Australia. In the 2021 census, Cawdor had a population of 420 people.

== History ==
The locality takes its name from the former Cawdor railway station, named by the Queensland Railway Department to be named after a character from William Shakespeare's play, Macbeth.

Cawdor Provisional School opened in October 1893. It had become Cawdor State School by 1897. It closed in 1951. It was on a 2-acre (0.81 ha) land parcel at 149 Cawdor Drive (27.4696°S 151.9191°E).

== Demographics ==
In the 2016 census, Cawdor had a population of 356 people.

In the 2021 census, Cawdor had a population of 420 people.

== Education ==
There are no schools in Cawdor. The nearest government primary schools are Highfields State School in neighbouring Highfields to the east, Gowrie State School in neighbouring Gowrie Junction to the south, and Meringandan State School in neighbouring Meringandan West to the north. The nearest government secondary school is Highfields State Secondary College in Highfields.
