= Goombungee, Queensland =

Goombungee
- Town
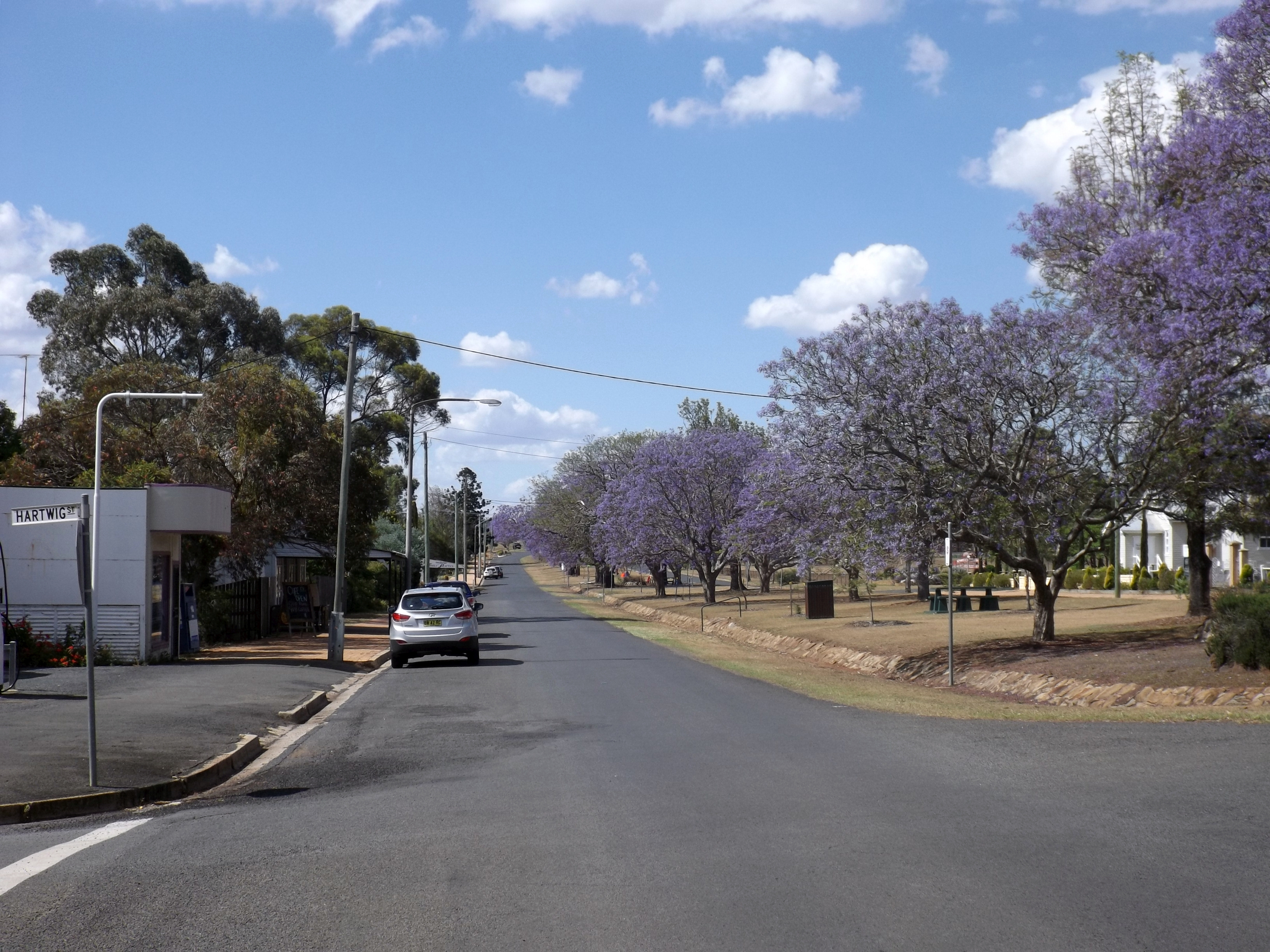
- Blooming Jacaranda trees on Kingsthorpe Haden Road, 2014

- Interactive map of Goombungee
- Coordinates: 27.3047°S 151.8519°E
- Country: Australia
- State: Queensland
- Region: Darling Downs
- LGA: Toowoomba Region
- Location: 23.7 km (14.7 mi) NNW of Highfields; 29.9 km (18.6 mi) NNE of Oakey; 37.9 km (23.5 mi) NNW of Toowoomba CBD; 163 km (101 mi) W of Brisbane

Government
  - State electorate: Condamine
  - Federal division: Groom

Area
  - Total: 76.4 km^{2} (29.5 sq mi)

Population
  - Total: 1,066 (2021 census)
  - Density: 13.953/km^{2} (36.14/sq mi)
- Time zone: UTC+10:00 (AEST)
- Postcode: 4354
- County: Aubigny
- Parish: Goombungee
Localities around Goombungee
Kilbirnie	Haden	Bergen
Highland Plains	Goombungee	Douglas
Silverleigh	Boodua	Muniganeen

Goombungee is a rural town and locality in the Toowoomba Region, Queensland, Australia. In the 2021 census, the locality of Goombungee had a population of 1,066 people.

== Geography ==
Goombungee is 35 kilometres (22 mi) north-west of Toowoomba in the Darling Downs.

The town is located in the centre of the locality. The main street through the town is the north-south Kingsthorpe Haden Road, which is known with the town as Mocatta Street.

There are three neighbourhoods within Goombungee:

- Kudo (27.3333°S 151.8333°E) around the former Kudo railway station, which was named by the Queensland Railways Department on 12 May 1910 and is an Aboriginal word meaning while ants/termites
- Nara (27.35°S 151.8166°E) around the former Nara railway station, which was named by the Queensland Railways Department on 12 May 1910 and is an Aboriginal word meaning duck
- Weelu (27.2833°S 151.8833°E) around the former Weelu railway station, which was named by the Queensland Railways Department on 8 June 1912 and is an Aboriginal word meaning stone plover

== Road infrastructure ==
The Pechey-Maclagan Road runs through from east to west, and the Kingsthorpe-Haden Road from south to north.

== History ==
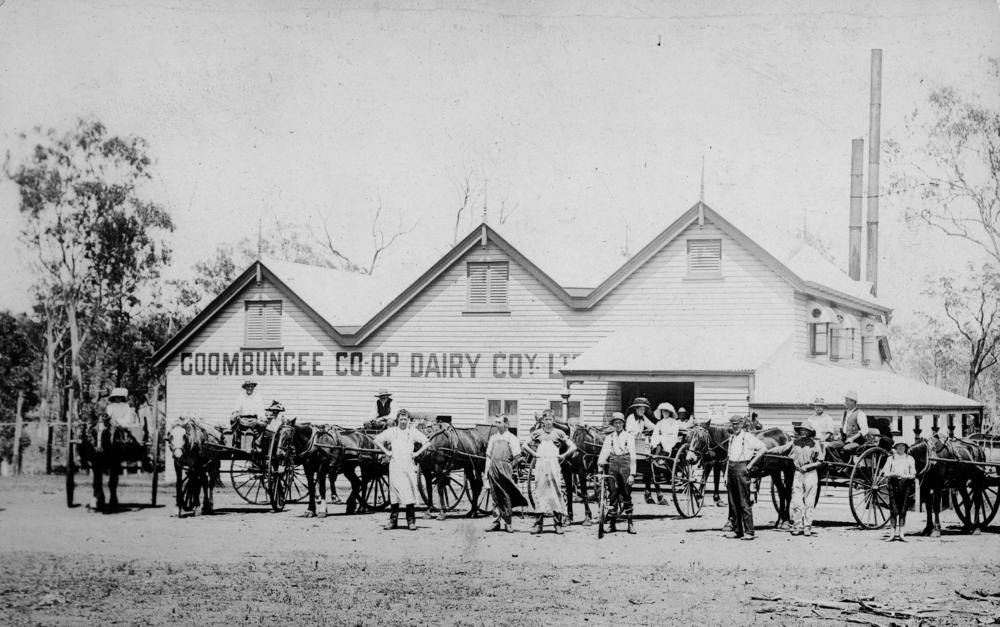
Goombungee Co-op Dairy Company, circa 1905

The name Goombungee derives from the parish, which in turn took its name from a pastoral run name named by pastoralist Charles William Pitts in 1854. It is thought be a corruption of an Aboriginal name for area, either goubunga or gonbunga.

The first meeting of the former local government area of Shire of Rosalie was held on 17 February 1879. The town is now part of the Toowoomba Region local government area. Goombungee Post Office opened by 1895 (a receiving office had been open from 1878, first known as Gomoran).

Local residents requested a school on 31 May 1880, claiming there were 36 school-aged children in the district. Goombungee Provisional School opened on 1 November 1881 in a 24-by-16-foot (7.3 by 4.9 m) weatherboard building with a shingle roof. The first head teacher was Mrs Annie McLeod Rowland. Although only 17 students enrolled in the school's first year, the original building became too small as the student numbers increased. A new larger building was opened on 3 October 1887 when the school became Goombungee State School. A new school building was built in 1933.

In October 1890, St Matthew's Lutheran Church opened with 500 people in attendance.

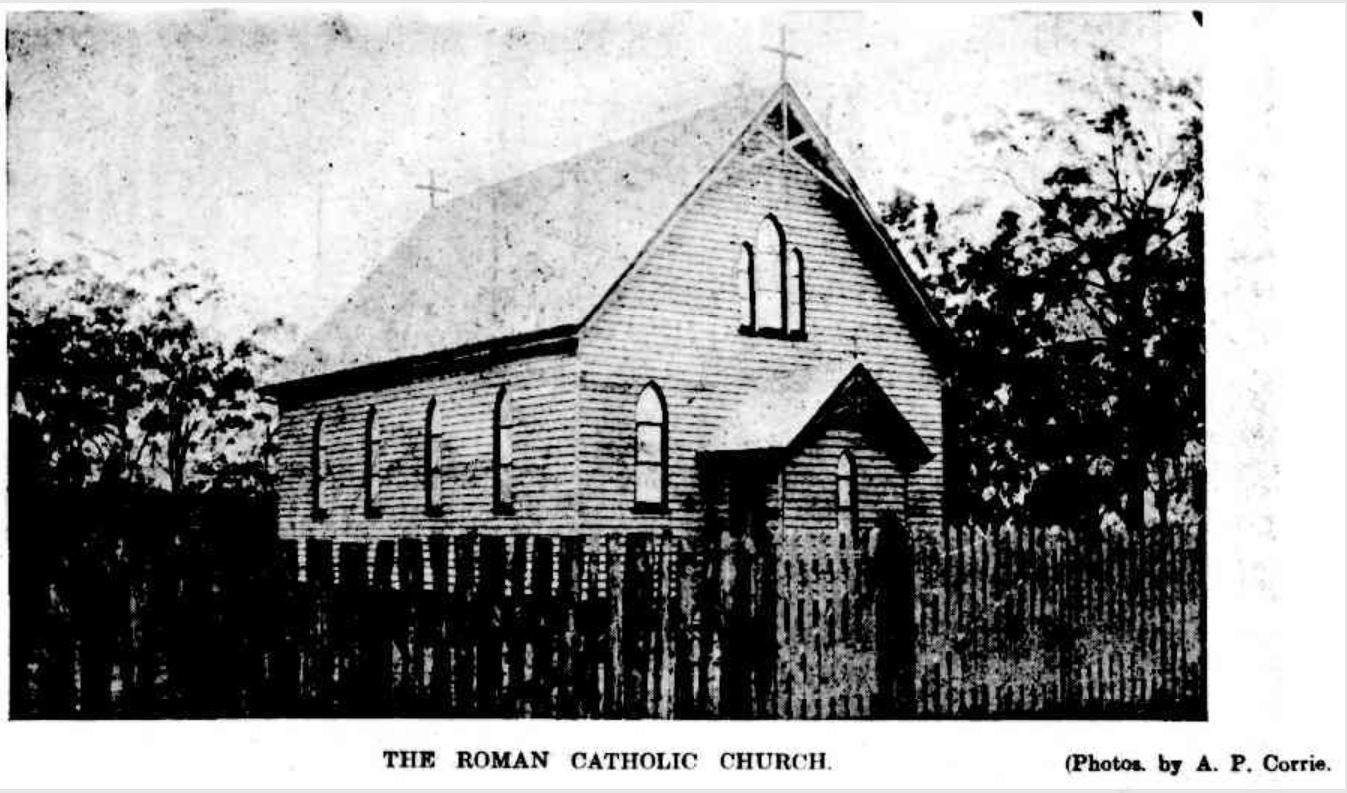
St Colman's Catholic Church, 1903

St Colman's Catholic Church was opened on Sunday 20 April 1902.

In August 1889 the Queensland Government provided 10 acres (4.0 ha) of land for a cemetery. However, the soil proved too difficult to dig a grave, so another 6.2-acre (2.5 ha) cemetery reserve was provided on 17 January 1894. The first burial in the new cemetery was Edith Annie Lloyd, aged 10 months, occurring on 23 July 1894. Although intended as a cemetery for Goombungee, its location resulted in it being used by residents of both Goombungee and Haden and the name Goombungee-Haden Cemetery began to be used in 1925. In 2008 the cemetery's private trustees handed over the responsibility for the cemetery to the Toowoomba Regional Council.

The Goombungee Congregational Church was completed in July 1903. As part of the creation of the Uniting Church in Australia, in 1977 it became the Goombungee Uniting Church in conjunction with the East Lynne (Boodua) Methodist congregation. In 1979, the former Greenwood Methodist Church was relocated to the site immediately east of the Congregational Church building and was officially opened as the new Goombungee Uniting Church on 22 April 1979 with the Congregational Church building becoming the church hall. In late 1999 the former Congregational Church building was demolished and the Peranga Uniting Church relocated to its site to be new church hall. On 26 August 2012 the site (with the Greenwood and Peranga buildings) was decommissioned as a church and subsequently sold into private ownership for $185,000. The church was at 6 George Street (27.3079°S 151.8534°E) and the church buildings are still extant (as at 2020).

Goombungee Methodist Church was officially opened on Wednesday 7 October 1903.

On Thursday 30 April 1908, St Mark's Anglican Church was opened by Archdeacon Henry Le Fanu.

In December 1920, the Goombungee War Memorial was unveiled by Sir T W Glasgow.

The Assembly of God church was built by volunteer labour on land donated by Stan and Mavis Kajewski. On 25 August 1956 the church was officially opened by Pastor H E Wiggins of Maryborough. When the Assembly of God amalgamated to form the Australian Christian Churches, the church was renamed Goombungee Christian Church.

Goombungee Wesleyan Methodist Church was established in 1981.

In 2003, the town was connected to a mains water supply.

The Goombungee Library opened in 2005.

In 2019 the Anglican parish of Crows Nest (which includes Goombungee) entered in a partnership with St David's Anglican Church in Chelmer, Brisbane, to share their ministry through a combination of services at the various churches combined with online services from St David's. It is an experiment in how the Anglican Church may operate in the future.

== Demographics ==
In the 2011 census, the locality of Goombungee had a population of 1,032 people.

In the 2016 census, the locality of Goombungee had a population of 1,026 people.

In the 2021 census, the locality of Goombungee had a population of 1,066 people.

== Heritage listings ==
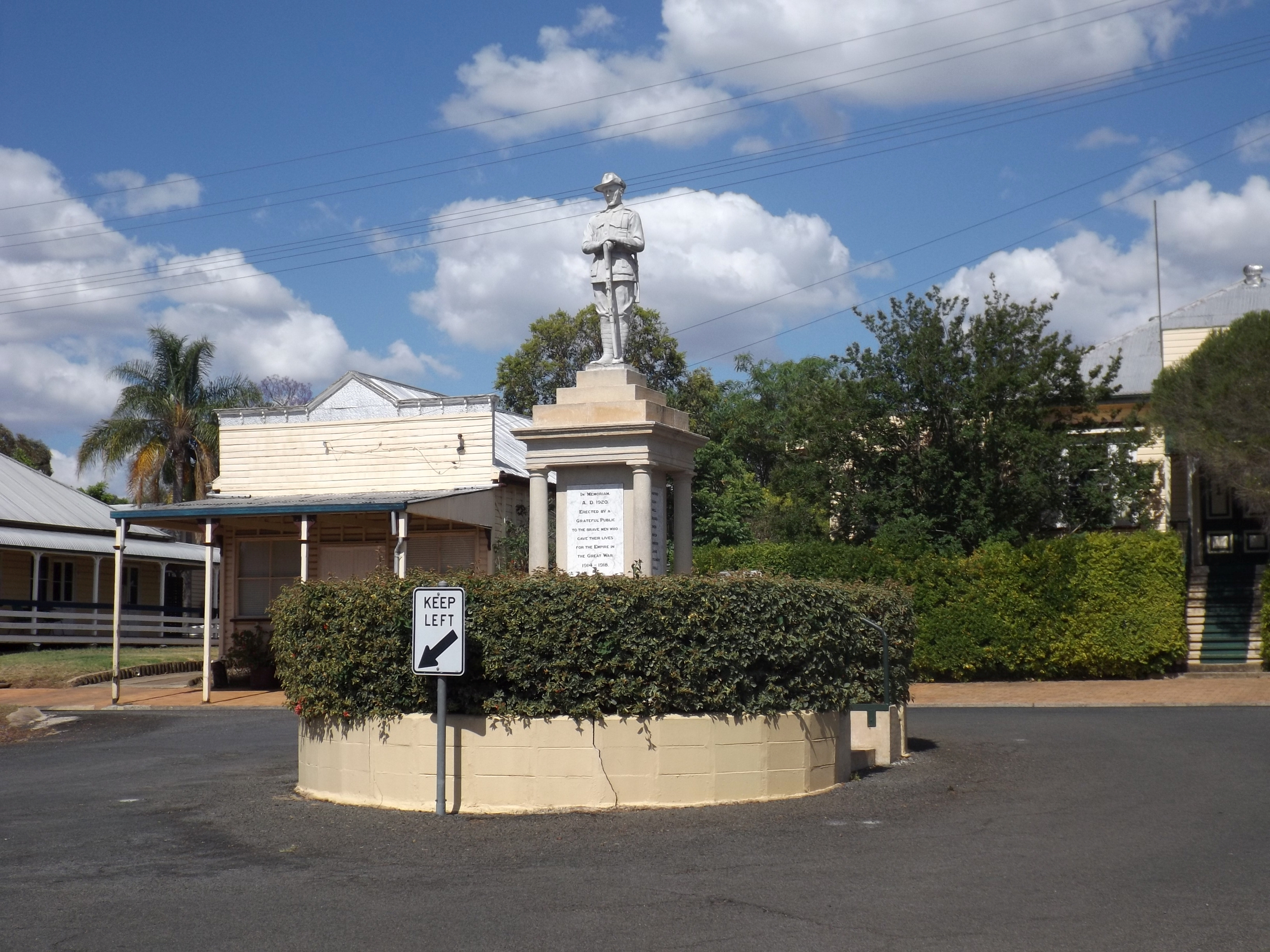
Goombungee War Memorial

Goombungee has a number of heritage-listed sites, including Goombungee War Memorial at the junction of Mocatta Street and Hartwig Street (27.3062°S 151.8516°E).

== Economy ==
There are a number of homesteads in the locality, including Gware Hill (27.3523°S 151.8217°E).

== Education ==
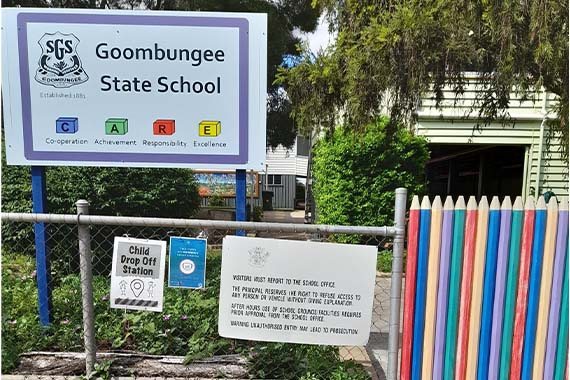
Goombungee State School, 2023

Goombungee State School is a government primary (Prep–6) school for boys and girls at 52 Mocatta Street (27.3020°S 151.8525°E). In 2018, the school had an enrolment of 115 students with 9 teachers (8 full-time equivalent) and 7 non-teaching staff (5 full-time equivalent).

There are no secondary schools in Goombungee. The nearest government secondary schools are Crow's Nest State School (to Year 10) in Crows Nest to the east, Highfields State Secondary College (to Year 12) in Highfields to the south, and Oakey State High School (to Year 12) in Oakey to the south-west.

== Facilities ==
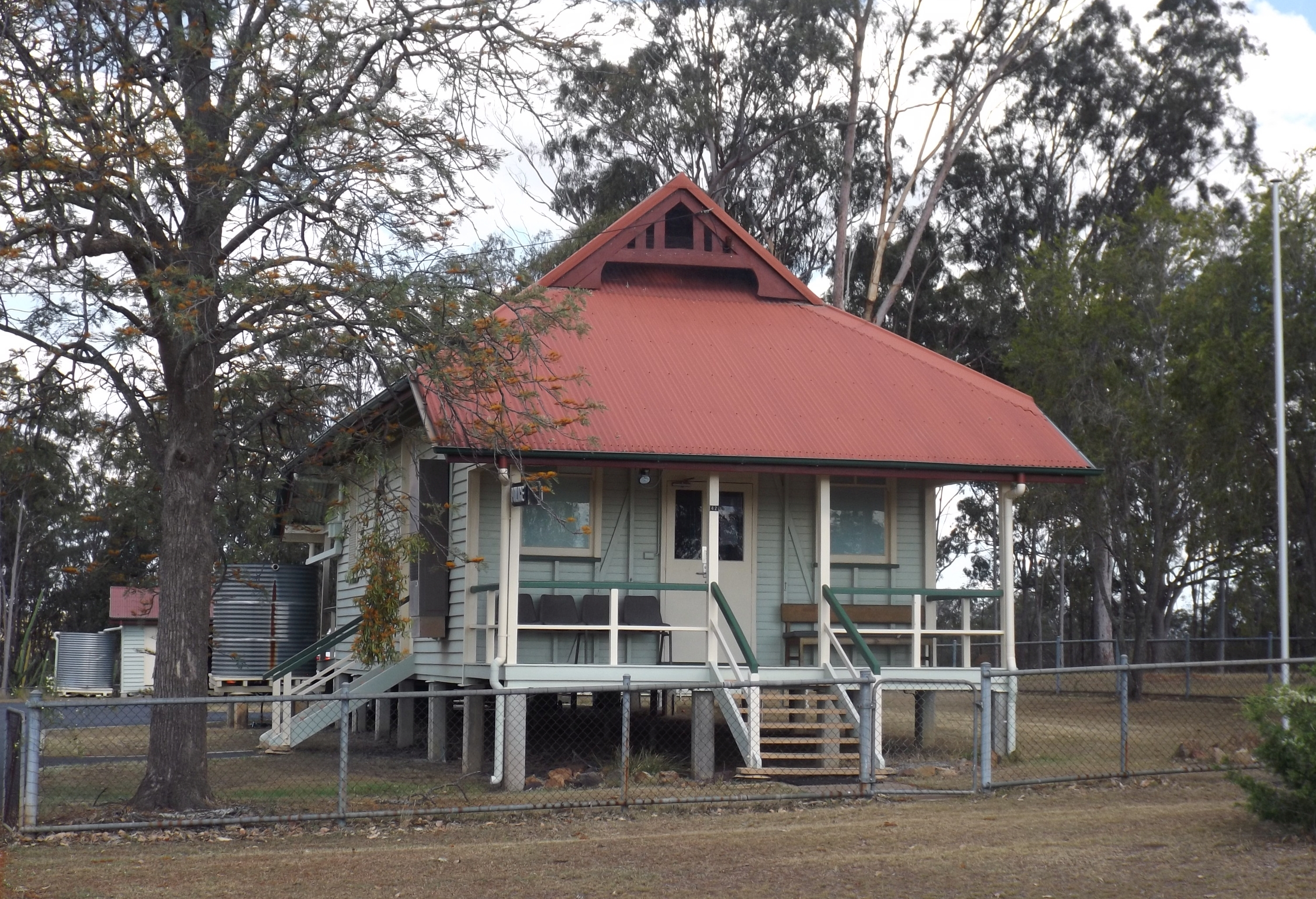
Goombungee police station, 2014

Goombungee Police Station is at 42 Barker Street (27.3067°S 151.8544°E).

Goombungee Fire Station and Goombungee SES Facility is at 33–35 Cooke Street (27.2972°S 151.8528°E).

Goombungee Rural Fire Station is at 4 King Street (27.3057°S 151.8533°E).

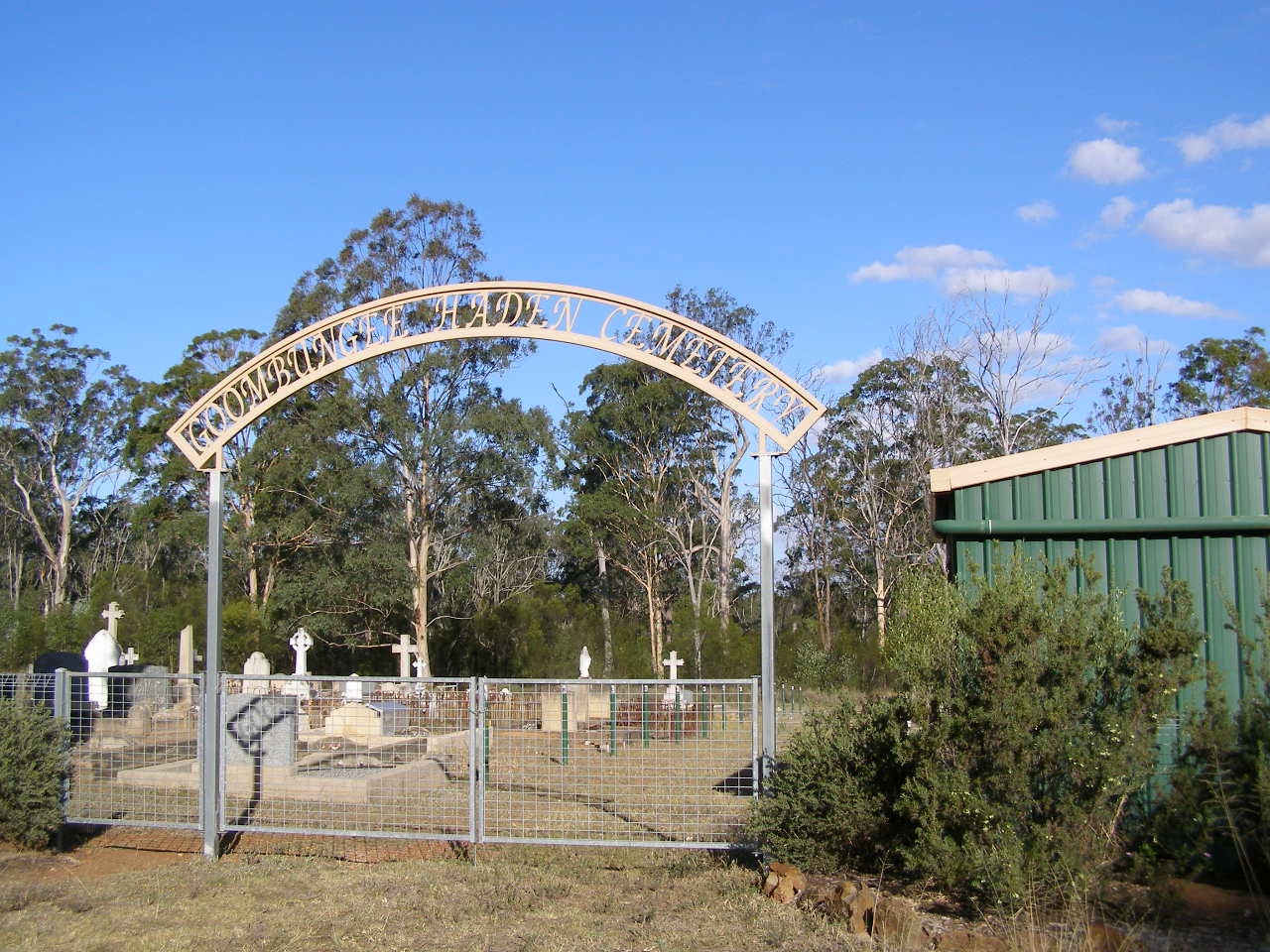
Goombungee Haden Cemetery, 2006

The Goombungee Haden cemetery is in Cemetery Road (27.2497°S 151.8630°E), which is now just over the boundary into neighbouring Haden.

== Amenities ==
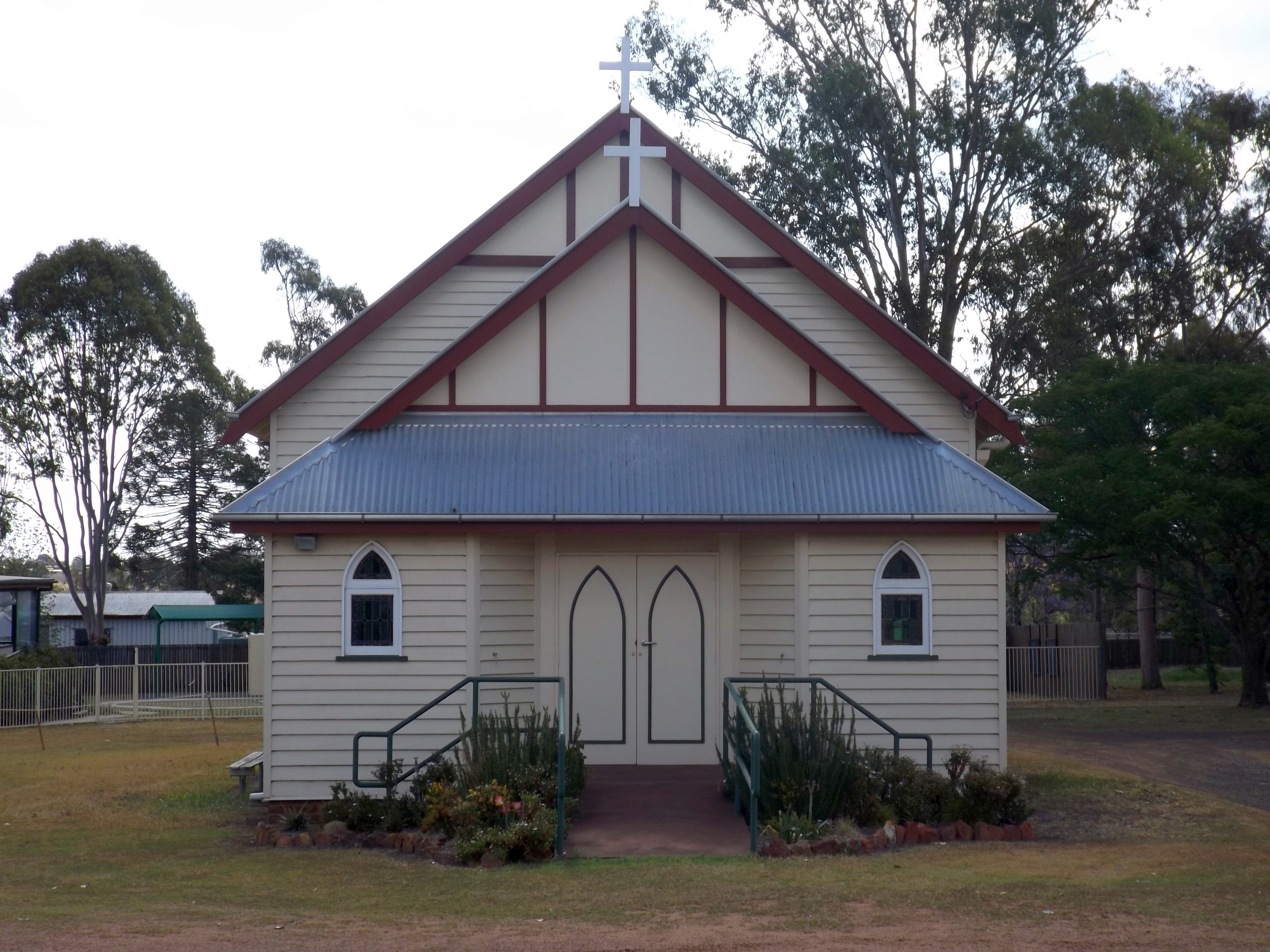
St Matthew's Lutheran Church, 2014

The Goombungee Library is operated by the Toowoomba Regional Council. The library is located at 89 Mocatta Street (27.3035°S 151.8506°E) and is open three days a week (Tuesday, Thursday and Saturday).

The Goombungee branch of the Queensland Country Women's Association meets at the CWA Rest Rooms at 56 Mocatta Street (27.3055°S 151.8520°E).

The town is served by a number of churches:

- St Matthew's Lutheran Church at 57-63 Mocatta Street (27.3014°S 151.8520°E)

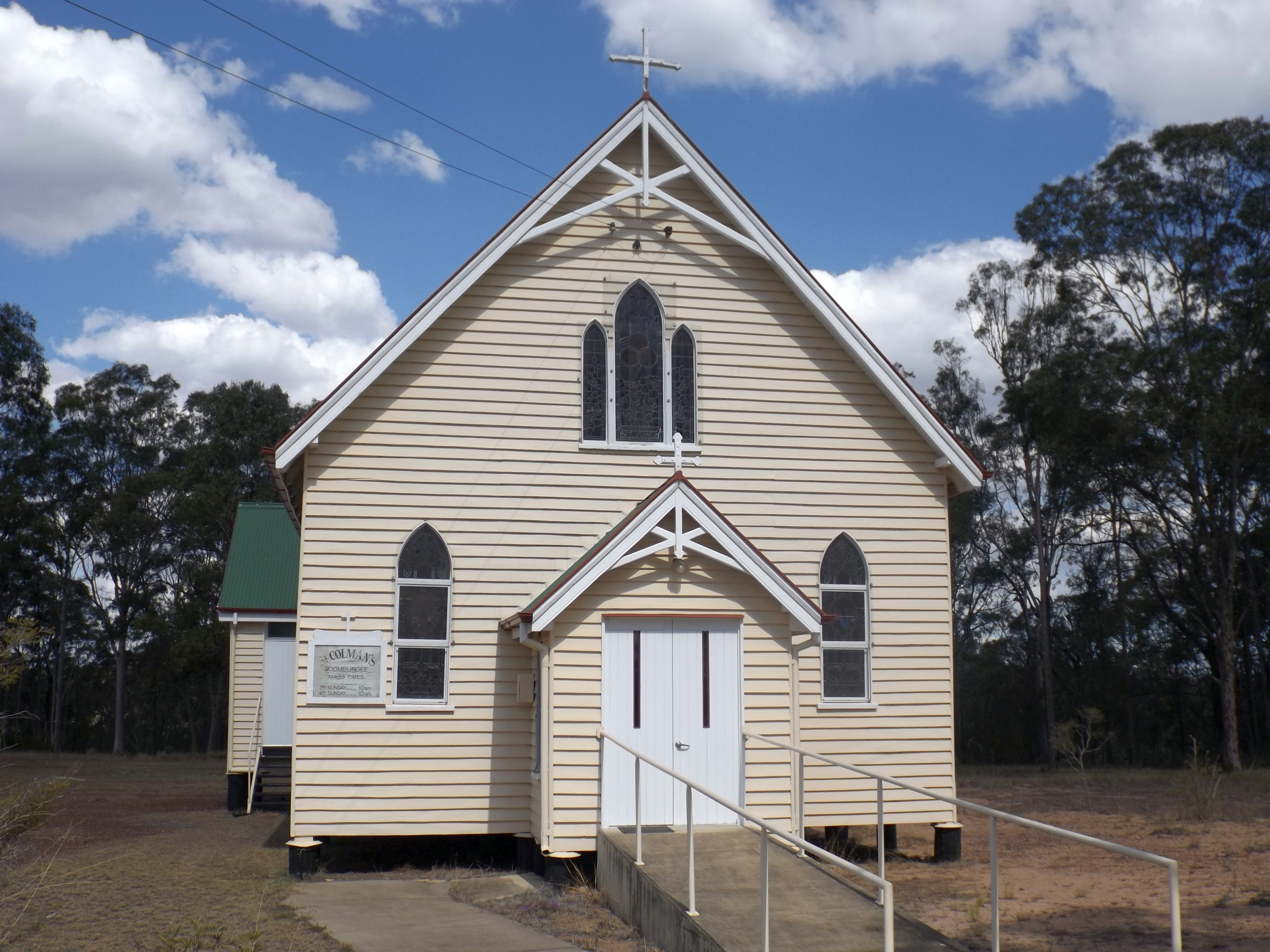
St Colman's Catholic Church, 2014

- St Colman's Catholic Church at 5 George Street (27.3072°S 151.8543°E)
- St Mark's Anglican Church at 40–42 King Street (27.3094°S 151.8527°E)
- Goombungee Wesleyan Methodist Church at 10–18 Albert Street (27.3037°S 151.8562°E), part of the Wesleyan Methodist Church of Australia
- Goombungee Christian Church at 54 Mocatta Street (27.3052°S 151.8521°E), part of the Australian Christian Churches

The Goombungee Showgrounds are in Lau Street (27.3049°S 151.8582°E).

There are a number of parks in the area:

- Norm Wockner Park at 22 John Street (27.3036°S 151.8488°E)
- Pioneer Park in King Street (27.3062°S 151.8536°E)
- Bottle Tree Park at 70 Moccatta Street (27.3064°S 151.8519°E)
- Sports and Recreation Reserve at Mocatta Street (corner Edward Street, 27.3044°S 151.8526°E)

Goombungee Golf Club has an 18-hole golf course on Golf Course Road (27.3270°S 151.8497°E).

== Events ==
Each November, Goombungee hosts a Jacaranda Day festival in the main street, celebrating the history of the town and the blooming jacarandas and silky oaks.

The annual Goombungee-Haden Show is held each autumn at the Showgrounds . The Goombungee Rodeo is also held there on the first Saturday in November.

== Attractions ==
The town boasts a unique ironman at the southern entrance to the town which is reminiscent of the Rural Ironman and Ironwoman competition which was once held annually on Australia Day. There is also a historic museum and an art gallery.

== Awards ==
Goombungee has won four Queensland Tidy Towns awards, in 1975/76, 1976/77, 1980/81 and 1981/82.
