= Geham =

- Suburb
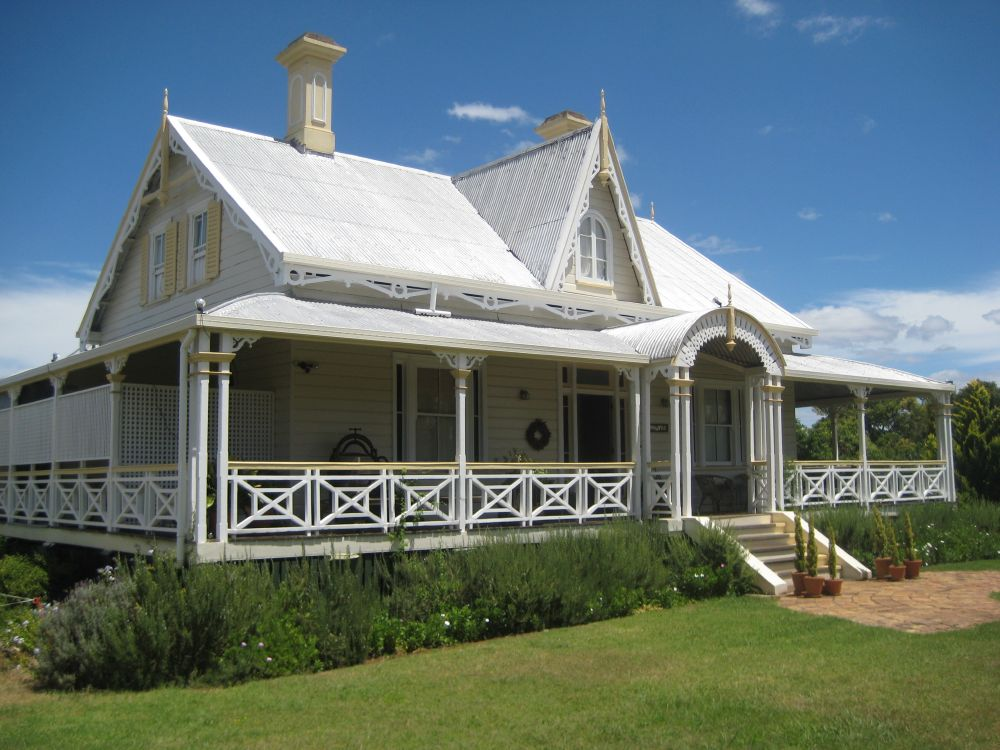
- Argyle Homestead, 2009

- Interactive map of Geham
- Coordinates: 27.3883°S 151.9983°E
- Country: Australia
- State: Queensland
- LGA: Toowoomba Region
- Location: 11.2 km (7.0 mi) NW of Highfields; 22.3 km (13.9 mi) NNE of Toowoomba CBD; 151 km (94 mi) W of Brisbane

Government
  - State electorate: Condamine
  - Federal division: Groom

Area
  - Total: 47.4 km^{2} (18.3 sq mi)

Population
  - Total: 470 (2021 census)
  - Density: 9.92/km^{2} (25.68/sq mi)
- Time zone: UTC+10:00 (AEST)
- Postcode: 4352
Suburbs around Geham
Groomsville	Groomsville	Merritts Creek
Groomsville	Geham	Mount Luke
Kleinton	Cabarlah	Fifteen Mile

Geham is a rural locality in the Toowoomba Region, Queensland, Australia. In the 2021 census, Geham had a population of 470 people.

== Geography ==
The locality is bounded to the north and north-west by Cooby Creek and to the west by the Cooby Creek Reservoir (also known as Lake Cooby) which impounds the creek.

The Great Dividing Range passes through the south-east of the locality from Mount Luke to Cabarlah, but there are no named peaks of the range within the locality. Cooby Mountain is in the west of the locality (27.3898°S 151.9683°E) and rises to 619 metres (2,031 ft) above sea level; it is not part of the range.

The New England Highway enters the locality from the north-west (Merritts Creek / Mount Luke) and exits to the south (Cabarlah).

Despite the names, the Geham National Park is in neighbouring Mount Luke, while the Geham State Forest is in neighbouring Mount Luke and Merritts Creek.

The land use is predominantly agricultural, a mixture of grazing on native vegetation, production forestry, and crop growing.

=== Climate ===
The locality is in two climate zones with the humid subtropical climate (Köppen: Cfa) in the north of the locality and the oceanic climate (Cfb) in the south of the locality. Gehem has the most northerly oceanic climate at altitude in Australia.

== History ==
Highfields Post Office opened on 1 January 1868 and was renamed Geham in 1876.

Highfields No. 2 State School opened on 4 April 1871 without any ceremony. It had an initial enrolment of 47 students with first headmaster John O'Beirne. It was renamed Geham State School in 1876. The school celebrated its 150th anniversary in 2021.

Geham Presbyterian Church was opened on Sunday 8 September 1878. It was built from timber on a 1/2-acre (0.20 ha) site donated by Mrs Black. It was re-erected in 1926.

Holy Trinity Anglican Church opened on Sunday 16 October 1887. It was dedicated on 29 October 1891 by the Very Reverend St Clair Donaldson. Its closure circa 2018 was approved by Bishop Cameron Venables. It was sold in September 2019 for $153,000. It was at 9 Pioneer Road (27.3916°S 151.9980°E), but the entrance to the church was on Connolly Road through a lychgate. As at August 2023, the church building is still extant.

== Demographics ==
In the 2016 census, Geham had a population of 489 people.

In the 2021 census, Geham had a population of 470 people.

== Heritage listings ==
Geham has a number of heritage-listed sites, including:

- Argyle Homestead: New England Highway (27.4044°S 151.9951°E)

== Education ==
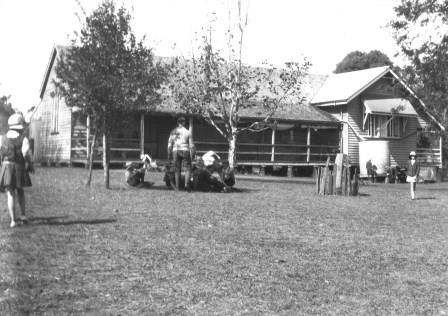
Early days at Geham State School

Geham State School is a government primary (Prep-6) school for boys and girls at 9625 New England Highway (27.4063°S 151.9959°E). In 2017, the school had an enrolment of 140 students with 11 teachers (8 full-time equivalent) and 9 non-teaching staff (5 full-time equivalent).

There are no secondary schools in Geham. The nearest government secondary schools are Highfields State Secondary College (to Year 12) in Highfields to the south-west and Crows Nest State School (to Year 10) in Crows Nest to the north-east.

== Amenities ==
Geham Presbyterian Church is at 9621 New England Highway (27.40576°S 151.99622°E), immediately north of the school.

== See also ==
- List of tramways in Queensland
