= Cabarlah, Queensland =

Cabarlah
- Town
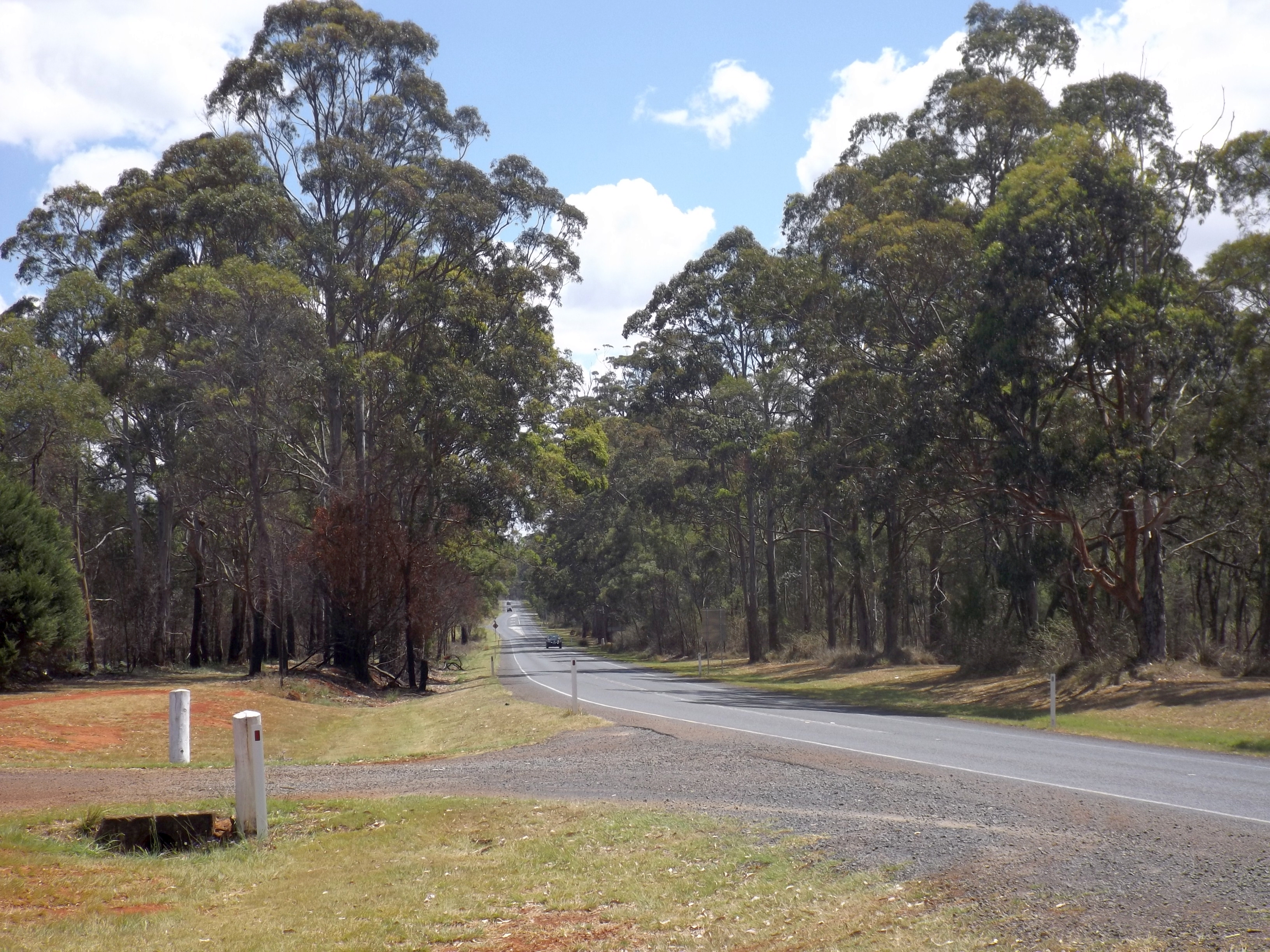
- New England Highway, 2014

- Interactive map of Cabarlah
- Coordinates: 27.4281°S 151.9919°E
- Country: Australia
- State: Queensland
- LGA: Toowoomba Region
- Location: 19.2 km (11.9 mi) NNE of Toowoomba CBD; 149 km (93 mi) W of Brisbane

Government
  - State electorates: Condamine; Toowoomba North
  - Federal division: Groom

Area
  - Total: 19.9 km^{2} (7.7 sq mi)

Population
  - Total: 1,307 (2021 census)
  - Density: 65.68/km^{2} (170.1/sq mi)
- Time zone: UTC+10:00 (AEST)
- Postcode: 4352
Localities around Cabarlah
| Kleinton | Geham | Fifteen Mile |
| Highfields | Cabarlah | Murphys Creek |
| Spring Bluff | Murphys Creek | Murphys Creek |

Cabarlah is a rural town and locality in the Toowoomba Region, Queensland, Australia. In the 2021 census, the locality of Cabarlah had a population of 1,307 people.

== Geography ==
Cabarlah is approximately 15 kilometres (9.3 mi) north of the Toowoomba city centre and has an area of approximately 20 square kilometres (7.7 sq mi). It is situated on the Great Dividing Range with views to the east of the Lockyer Valley through to Brisbane and to the west across the Darling Downs. Traditionally the area has been used for farming however in recent years the expansion of the Toowoomba Regional Council has led to acreage and other residential development.

Geengee is a neighbourhood in the west of the locality (27.4333°S 151.9833°E). It is based around the former Geengee railway station which operated from 1886 to 1961 on the now-closed Crows Nest railway line. The name Geengee is an Aboriginal word meaning green vegetation along a creek.

== History ==
In the 1860s to 1883 the area was called Five-Mile Camp. The name Cabarlah was used after Crows Nest railway line (from Toowoomba to Crows Nest) was built. It is thought that the name Cabarlah derived from an Aboriginal expression describing the ring-tailed possum. However, a 1930 newspaper article claims it is a "Native name of the mountains in the neighbourhood".

The Queensland Government set aside land for the Geham Cemetery (now the Cabarlah Cemetery) on 11 September 1878. Trustees were appointed on 2 January 1880 with the first burials occurring in 1881.

Highfields No 2 State School opened on 27 March 1871. In 1875 it was renamed Geham State School in 1875.

Borneo Barracks was originally established as a World War I training area.

Cabarlah Post Office opened on 1 July 1927 (a receiving office had been open from 1884).

Since the Second World War, Cabarlah has also had a significant role as a base for the Australian Army. It was home to elements of the 7th Brigade early in the war. Later in the war it became a hub for signals and other training. Cabarlah is now home to the 7th Signal Regiment (Electronic Warfare) and other Australian Defence Force signals facilities.

St Martin's Anglican Church was opened at the Cabarlah Barracks in 1959 but closed circa 1961.

The Cabarlah Community School opened in Wirraglen Road, Highfields, on 23 January 2006. It used the Reggio Emilia teaching philosophy. In March 2008 it was closed when the Queensland Government's Non-State Schools Accreditation Board refused to accredit the school, claiming it did not meet the requirements of the Education (Accreditation of Non-State Schools) Act 2001. Although the school appealed the decision, the Queensland Education Minister, Rod Weldford, upheld the board's decision.

== Demographics ==
In the 2016 census, the locality of Cabarlah had a population of 1,075 people. 83.6% of people were born in Australia and 93.2% of people only spoke English at home. The most common responses for religion were No Religion 26.3%, Catholic 22.5% and Anglican 18.2%.

In the 2021 census, the locality of Cabarlah had a population of 1,307 people.

== Education ==
There are no schools in Cabarlah. The nearest government primary schools are Geham State School in neighbouring Geham to the north and Highfields State School in Highfields to the west. The nearest government secondary school is Highfields State Secondary College in Highfields.

== Facilities ==
The Borneo Barracks are at 10046 New England Highway (27.4436°S 151.9787°E). The Defence School of Signals is within the barracks (27.4460°S 151.9825°E). Borneo Barracks Sewage Treatment Plant is also on the barrack's site (27.4425°S 151.9865°E).

Cabarlah Rural Fire Station is at 9918 New England Highway (27.4318°S 151.9905°E).

The Cabarlah Cemetery is located at 10148 New England Highway (27.4512°S 151.9876°E). It is operated by the Toowoomba Regional Council.

== Amenities ==
The Cabarlah Golf Club is located at Borneo Barracks (27.4431°S 151.9865°E). It is open to the public, but visitors must present their drivers licence for identification to enter the site.

== Attractions ==
Black Forest Hill Clock Centre is at 9917 New England Highway (27.4323°S 151.9916°E). It specialises in grandfather clocks and cuckoo clocks.
