= Highfields, Queensland =

Highfields
- Town
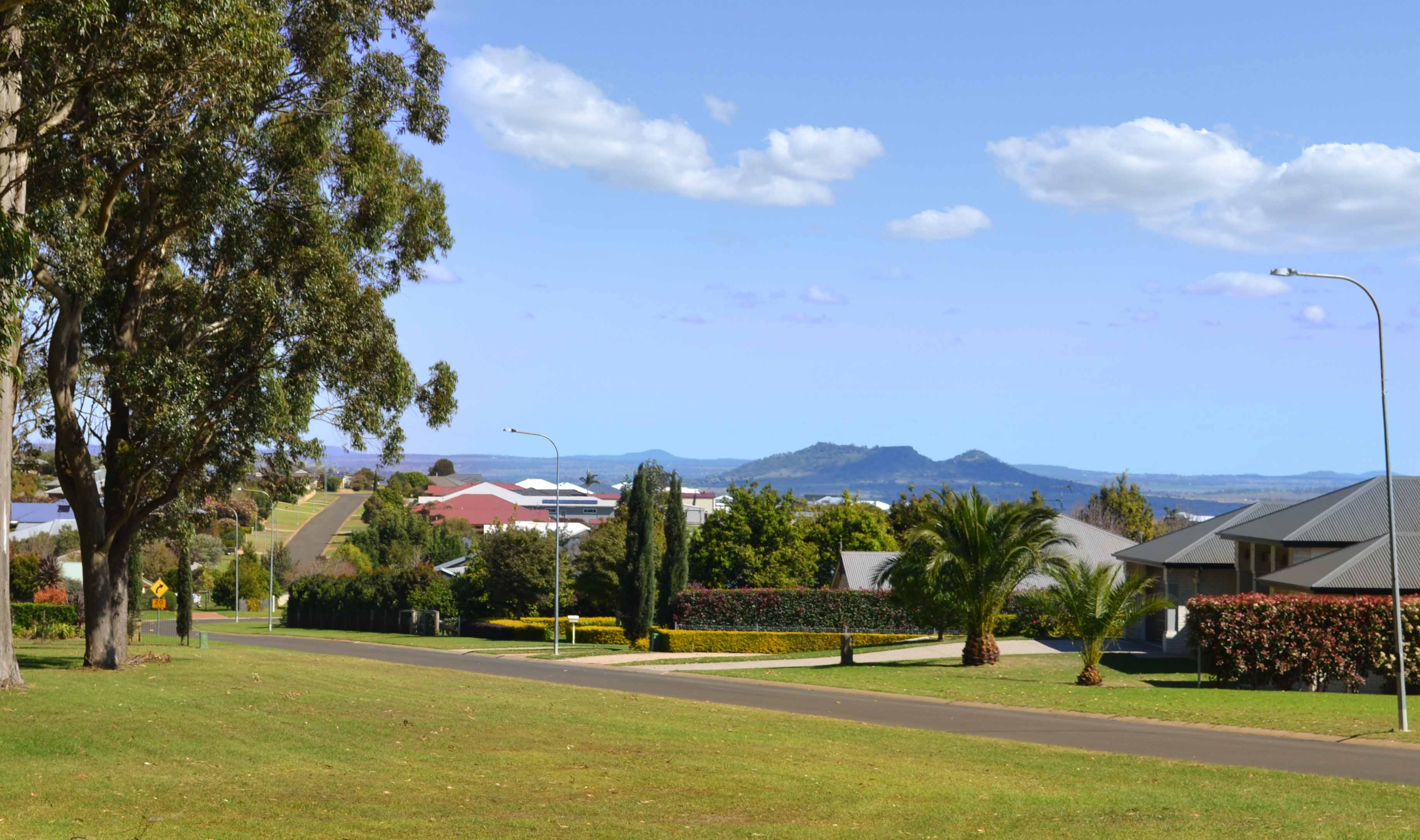
- View over Highfields from Mitchell Road Park, looking west towards Gowrie Mountain

- Interactive map of Highfields
- Coordinates: 27.4633°S 151.9458°E
- Country: Australia
- State: Queensland
- LGA: Toowoomba Region
- Location: 14.9 km (9.3 mi) N of Toowoomba CBD; 143 km (89 mi) W of Brisbane

Government
  - State electorate: Toowoomba North
  - Federal division: Groom

Area
  - Total: 26.1 km^{2} (10.1 sq mi)
- Elevation: 700 m (2,300 ft)

Population
  - Total: 8,131 (2021 census)
  - Density: 311.5/km^{2} (806.9/sq mi)
- Time zone: UTC+10:00 (AEST)
- Postcode: 4352
Localities around Highfields
Meringandan	Kleinton	Cabarlah
Woolmer; Cawdor	Highfields	Spring Bluff
Birnam	Blue Mountain Heights	Ballard

Highfields is a town and locality in the Toowoomba Region, Queensland, Australia. In the 2021 census, the locality of Highfields had a population of 8,568 people.

== History ==
The area probably takes its name from Edward Pechey who owned property and a Sawmill in the area. He came from Langham in Essex, where there was a Highfields School. although the Globe suggests there was a Highfields pastoral run, north of the township. The area was first developed in the 1860s. Initially, there were a number of sawmills in the area, harvesting the local timber. Then the construction of the railway line between Ipswich and Toowoomba (completed in 1867) brought railway workers to the district. As the timber-getters cleared the land, dairy farms were established. The first post office openly briefly in 1866 with a weekly mail service from Toowoomba. It re-opened in 1868 and changed its name in December 1877 to Koojarewon.

The Highfields School opened on 17 January 1870 in the Rising Sun Hotel under teacher Mr Larkin. The first school building was constructed in the 1880s. In 1907, the school was renamed Koojarawon, but was reverted to Highfields by the end of 1907.

In 1879, a Baptist Church opened in Highfields. On Sunday 22 November 1908, the church was reopened following a major reconstruction.

In 1907, the protests of residents resulted in both the school and the post office returning to the name Highfields. Another post office in the Highfields area is now the Geham Post Office.

View Glen State School opened on Highfields Road on 25 May 1914. It closed in 1924.

At the start of the 1960s, Highfields remained a rural community with, at one stage, only 9 children enrolled in the Highfields State School. However, residential subdivision started to occur in the 1960s, to a point where it is now considered a satellite town of Toowoomba. As at 2014, the school was one of the largest primary schools in the Toowoomba and Darling Downs region.

Toowoomba Christian College opened on 30 January 1979.

Mary MacKillop Catholic School opened on 26 January 2003 as primary school. In 2015, it was renamed Mary Mackillop Catholic College to reflect its expansion to secondary schooling.

The Cabarlah Community School opened in Wirraglen Road in January 2006. It used the Reggio Emilia teaching philosophy. In March 2008 it was closed when the Queensland Government's Non-State Schools Accreditation Board refused to accredit the school, claiming it did not meet the requirements of the Education (Accreditation of Non-State Schools) Act 2001. Although the school appealed the decision, the Queensland Education Minister, Rod Weldford, upheld the board's decision.

The Highfields Library opened in 2006 with a major refurbishment in 2017, with a new library/community centre opening in 2022, to cater for the population growth in the district.

Highfields State Secondary College opened on Tuesday 27 January 2015.

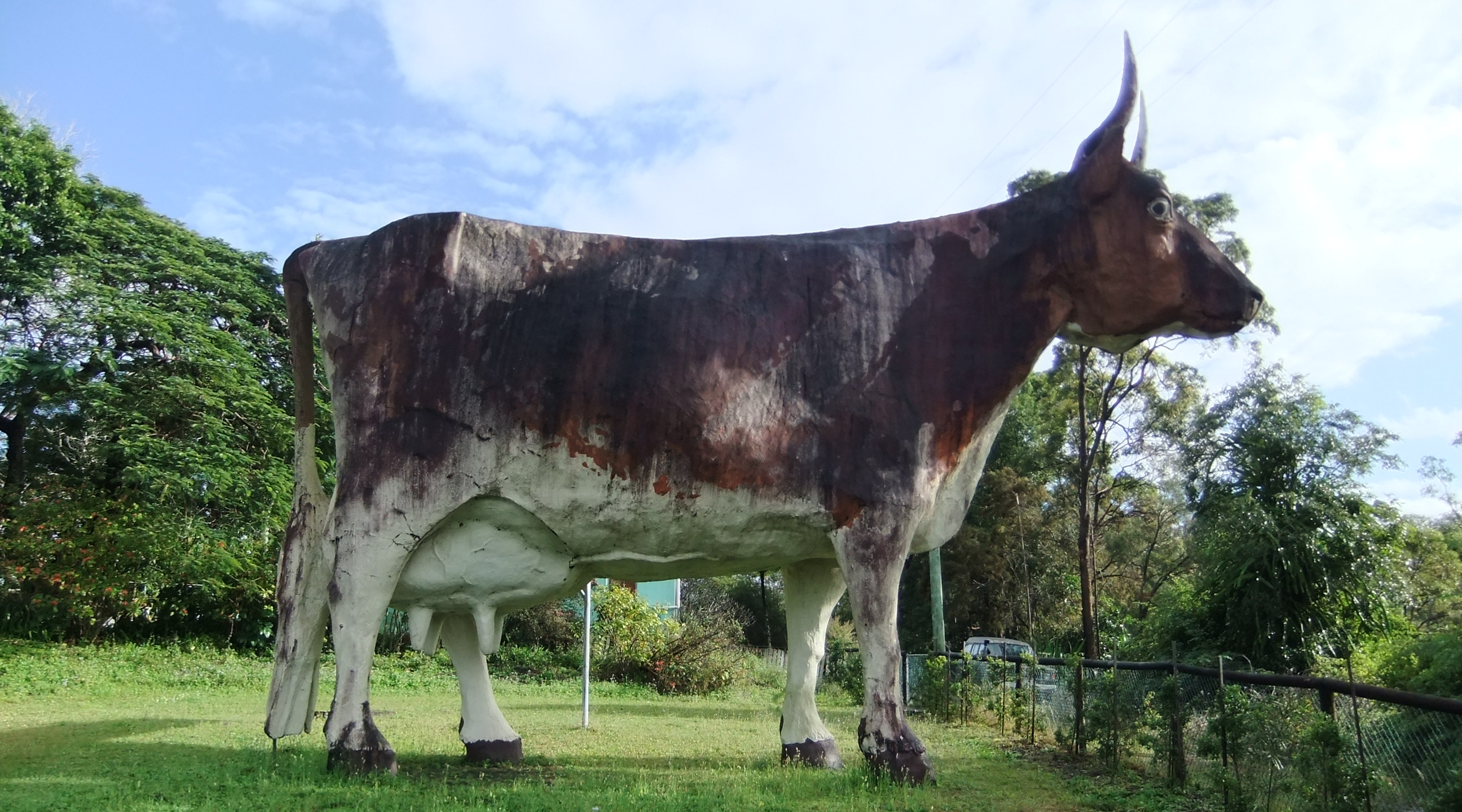
The Big Cow at Kulangoor, prior to its move to Highfields

On 10 January 2020, the Big Cow was moved to the Highfields Pioneer Village, where it was restored and officially re-opened on 20 September 2020. The Big Cow was built in the 1970s to attract tourists to a working dairy farm at 9-11 Ayrshire Rd, Kulangoor. It is one of the many Australian Big Things. It was sculpted by Hugh Anderson, who also sculpted the Big Bulls in Rockhampton. The Big Cow is seven times the size of an Ayrshire cow on which it is modelled. It is made of concrete and described as "able to withstand a cyclone". After the dairy farm closed, the Big Cow remained on the property which was used for a variety of purposes. In March 2016, the Big Cow was described as "closed and fallen into disrepair".

== Geography ==
Highfields is situated on the Great Dividing Range, slightly north of Mount Kynoch. It is on the New England Highway.

The town centre is in the centre of the locality with the surrounding land use being suburban housing. The outskirts of the locality are used for agriculture, a mixture of grazing and crop growing.

The town is a satellite community of the city of Toowoomba.

=== Climate ===
Along with Meringandan, the climate is oceanic (Köppen: Cfb) due to elevation, usually located further south of Australia.

== Demographics ==
In the 2016 census, the locality of Highfields had a population of 8,131 people.

In 2017, it was the fastest growing area in Toowoomba.

In the 2021 census, the locality of Highfields had a population of 8,568 people.

== Education ==
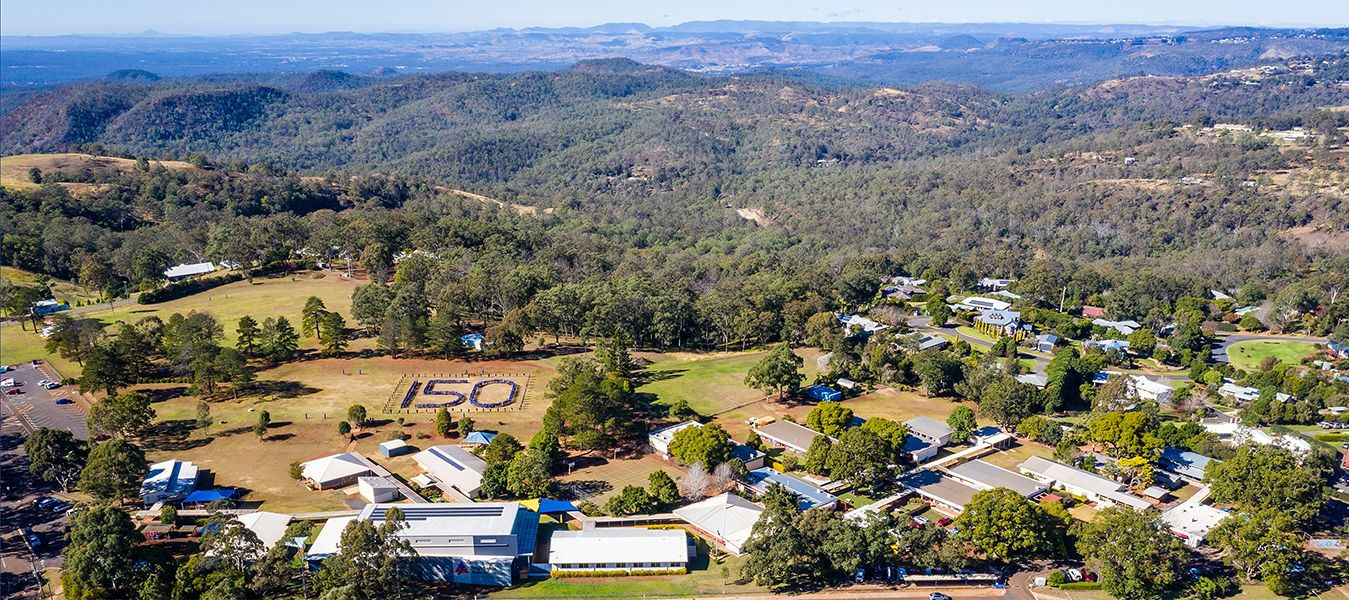
Aerial view of Highfields State School, 2021

Highfields State School is a government primary (Prep–6) school for boys and girls at 10459 New England Highway (27.4628°S 151.9557°E). In 2018, the school had an enrolment of 730 students with 56 teachers (50 full-time equivalent) and 32 non-teaching staff (22 full-time equivalent). It includes a special education program.

Toowoomba Christian College is a private primary and secondary (Prep–12) school for boys and girls at 10852 New England Highway (27.4877°S 151.9492°E). In 2018, the school had an enrolment of 697 students with 47 teachers (44 full-time equivalent) and 37 non-teaching staff (29 full-time equivalent).

Mary MacKillop Catholic College is a Catholic primary and secondary (Prep–9) school for boys and girls at 75 Highfields Road (27.4512°S 151.9428°E). In 2018, the school had an enrolment of 696 students with 51 teachers (46 full-time equivalent) and 38 non-teaching staff (28 full-time equivalent).

Highfields State Secondary College is a government secondary (7–12) school for boys and girls at 10 O'Brien Road (27.4466°S 151.9511°E). In 2018, the school had an enrolment of 810 students with 66 teachers (64 full-time equivalent) and 35 non-teaching staff (26 full-time equivalent). It includes a special education program.

== Amenities ==
A blooming magnolia x soulangeana tree in a Highfields garden.

The Cultural Centre is a large venue for conferences and performances. Also located at the Centre is an outdoor public swimming complex with a large indoor arena holding two volleyball and basketball courts and a gym. Just outside this is the Highfields Library at Community Court; the library is operated by the Toowoomba Regional Council and is open seven days. On the other side of the Cultural Centre is a skate park.

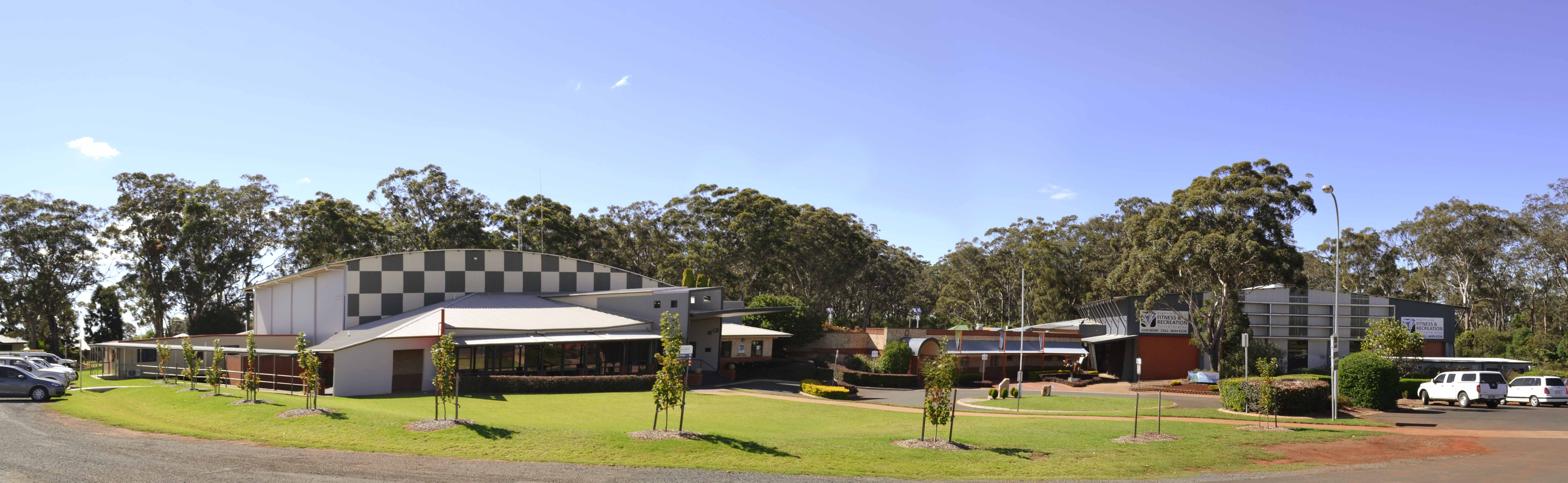
(from left to right) The Highfields Cultural Centre, Aquatic Centre and Library

The Highfields Sport & Recreation Park opened in 2019, which includes a number of netball courts, multi-use sporting fields, and tennis courts; amenities, picnic areas, and 150 additional car parking spaces.

A shopping centre called Highfields Village was developed and opened in 2003 that contains a number of community stores, including a hardware store, a baker and a supermarket. A tavern was also opened at the site in 2003. The centre also contains a pizza store, a post office, a bank and a hairdressing salon. In addition to the Highfields Village shopping centre, the Plaza shopping centre was recently redeveloped (2007). It now has a supermarket, newsagency, numerous banks, takeaways and a hair dresser. Also serving the community are a small bundle of shops found on the turn off from the New England Highway to Highfields Road, amongst them include a bakery, a delicatessen, a hairdressers, a real estate agency and an auto parts shop.

The Highfields branch of the Queensland Country Women's Association meets at 2/10498 New England Highway.
