= Pechey =

Pechey is a surname, and may refer to:

- Alfred Pechey (1840–1882), Australian politician
- Archibald Thomas Pechey (1876–1961), English writer
- Edith Pechey (1845–1908), pioneer English physician and suffragist
- Edward Wilmot Pechey (1841–1904), Australian politician
- John Pechey (1655–1716), English medical writer
- Phyllis Nan Sortain Pechey or Fanny Cradock (1909–1994), English TV presenter and writer

== See also ==
- Pechey, Queensland, Australia
- Pechey Forestry Arboretum, in Pechey
