= Glenaven, Queensland =

Glenaven
- Suburb
- Interactive map of Glenaven
- Coordinates: 27.1766°S 151.9725°E
- Country: Australia
- State: Queensland
- LGA: Toowoomba Region
- Location: 17.2 km (10.7 mi) NE of Haden; 17.7 km (11.0 mi) NW of Crows Nest; 49.3 km (30.6 mi) N of Highfields; 60.4 km (37.5 mi) N of Toowoomba CBD; 168 km (104 mi) WNW of Brisbane

Government
  - State electorate: Condamine
  - Federal division: Maranoa

Area
  - Total: 26.8 km^{2} (10.3 sq mi)
- Elevation: 430–600 m (1,410–1,970 ft)

Population
  - Total: 68 (2021 census)
  - Density: 2.537/km^{2} (6.57/sq mi)
- Time zone: UTC+10:00 (AEST)
- Postcode: 4355
Suburbs around Glenaven
Emu Creek	Emu Creek	Emu Creek
Djuan	Glenaven	Jones Gully
Upper Pinelands	Pinelands	Pinelands

Glenaven is a rural locality in the Toowoomba Region, Queensland, Australia. In the 2021 census, Glenaven had a population of 68 people.

== Geography ==
The terrain is undulating ranging from 420 to 600 metres (1,380 to 1,970 ft) above sea level. The land on the eastern edge of the locality is undeveloped. Apart from that, the land is mostly used for grazing on native vegetation with some crop growing.

The New England Highway enters the locality from the south-east (Pinelands) and exits to the north-west (Emu Creek).

== History ==
Glenaven Provisional School opened on 21 October 1895. On 1 January 1909, it became Glenaven State School. It closed in 1934. It was on a 10-acre (4.0 ha) site at 160 Kluger Road (corner Djuan Road, 27.1872°S 151.9808°E).

In 1901, a Methodist Church was built in Glenaven at a cost of £100. In November 1924, it was relocated to a more central site and enlarged. It is not clear when the church closed, but, in 1968, the building materials of the church were used to build a new Methodist church at Gowrie Flats (now Djuan).

The locality was officially named Glenhaven in 1999, but was renamed Glenaven in 2005.

== Demographics ==
In the 2016 census, Glenaven had a population of 79 people.

In the 2021 census, Glenaven had a population of 68 people.

== Education ==
There are no schools in Glenaven. The nearest government primary schools are Haden State School in Haden to the south-west and Crow's Nest State School in Crows Nest to the south-east. The nearest government secondary schools are Crow's Nest State School (to Year 10) and Highfields State Secondary College (to Year 12) in Highfields to the south.

== Facilities ==
Despite the name, the Emu Creek Cemetery is within the locality on the northern side of the New England Highway (27.1521°S 151.9642°E).
