= Douglas, Queensland (Toowoomba Region) =

Douglas
- Suburb
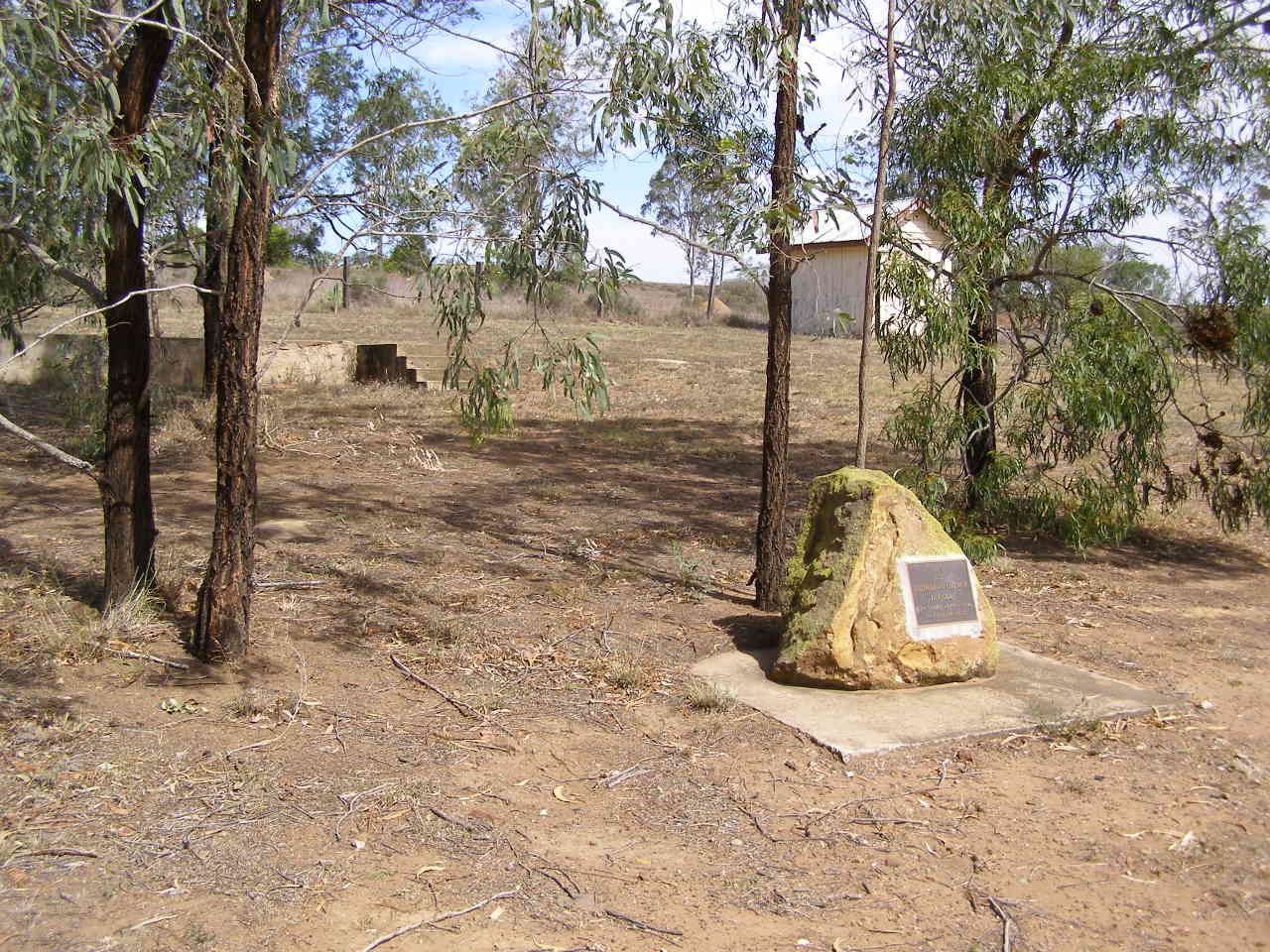
- Monument on the site of the Douglas Lutheran Church, 2006

- Interactive map of Douglas
- Coordinates: 27.3316°S 151.9175°E
- Country: Australia
- State: Queensland
- LGA: Toowoomba Region
- Location: 7.1 km (4.4 mi) E of Goombungee; 19.3 km (12.0 mi) SW of Crows Nest; 23.1 km (14.4 mi) N of Highfields; 37.3 km (23.2 mi) N of Toowoomba; 161 km (100 mi) WNW of Brisbane

Government
  - State electorate: Condamine
  - Federal divisions: Groom; Maranoa

Area
  - Total: 49.2 km^{2} (19.0 sq mi)

Population
  - Total: 152 (2021 census)
  - Density: 3.089/km^{2} (8.00/sq mi)
- Time zone: UTC+10:00 (AEST)
- Postcode: 4354
Suburbs around Douglas
Goombungee	Bergen	Plainby
Goombungee	Douglas	Groomsville
Muniganeen	Meringandan	Groomsville

Douglas is a rural locality in the Toowoomba Region, Queensland, Australia. In the 2021 census, Douglas had a population of 152 people.

== Geography ==
The Pechey-Maclagan Road runs through the locality from east to west.

The predominant land use is grazing on native vegetation and crop growing.

== History ==
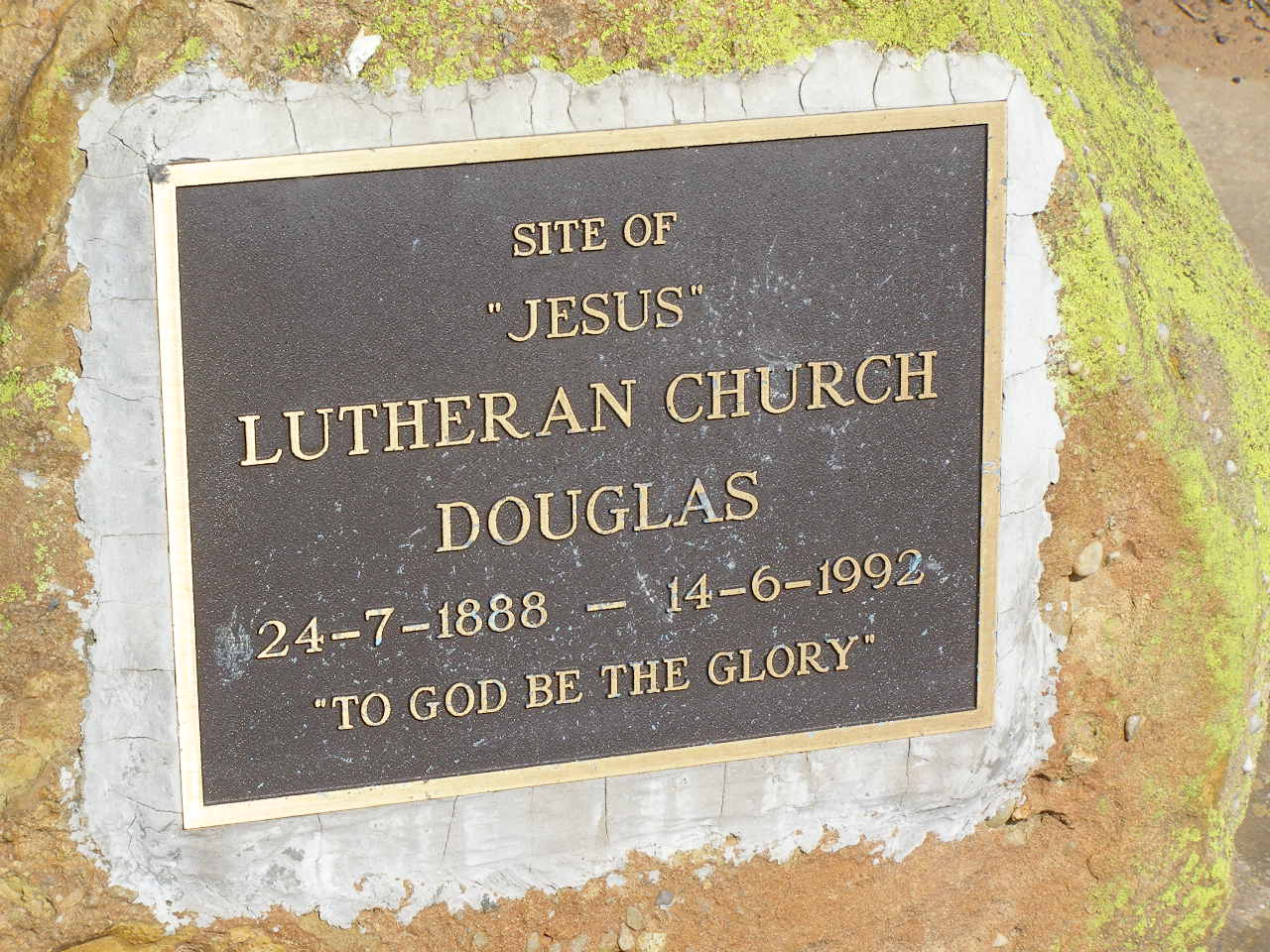
Plaque marking the original site of Douglas Lutheran Church, 2006

German settlers arrived in the district in 1875. A Lutheran congregation formed and worshipped in private homes, until the Jesus Lutheran Church was opened on 24 July 1882 on the Douglas Plainby Road (27.3084°S 151.9190°E). The church was enlarged in 1938.

On 21 December 1886, the Queensland Government reserved a 10-acre (4.0 ha) site for a cemetery. A section for Lutheran burials was created in the north-west of the site and a section for Catholic burials in the south.

Gomoron Provisional School opened on 28 February 1889 under head teacher Mary Ann Frawley. It was most likely named after Gomaren Creek which flows through the area. It became Goromon State School in 1890. In 1911, its name was changed to Douglas State School, to avoid post office confusion as there was another place called Gomaren. The school closed on 29 March 1959 with the remaining students transferred to Goombungee State School. It was at Douglas Plainby Road (corner Guy Road, 27.3212°S 151.9106°E). The building was relocated to becomes to Girl Guides building in Crows Nest.

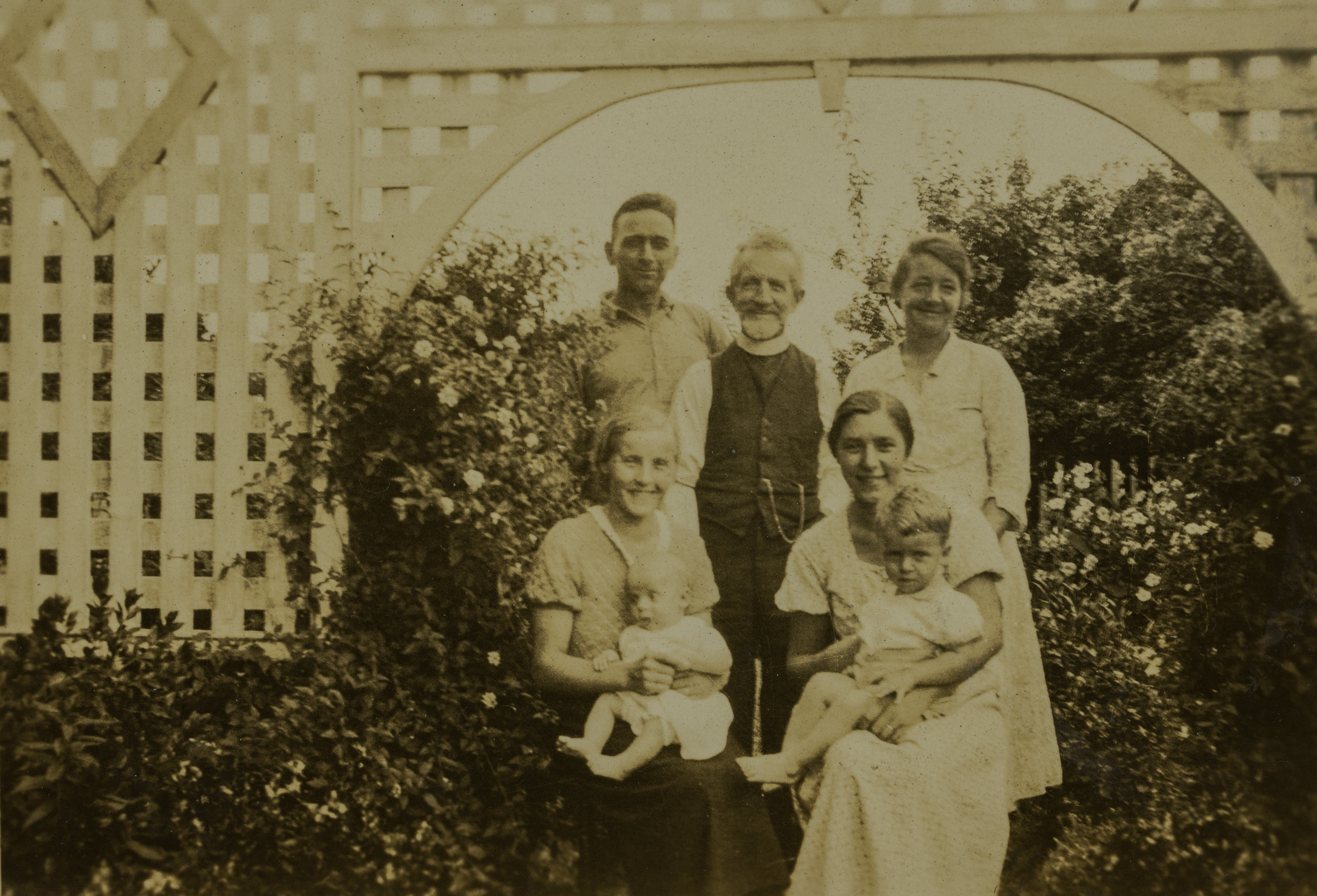
Pastor Wilhelm Poland (centre rear) with his family at Crows Nest, circa 1933

Pastor Wilhelm Georg Friedrich Poland was the Lutheran minister in Douglas from 1910 until his retirement in 1933. During World War I, he was interned at Trial Bay Gaol as an enemy alien.

In 1992, the Jesus Lutheran church building was relocated to be the chapel at the Ballon Outdoor Education Centre in the Barakula State Forest in Durah (Western Downs Region), operated by Concordia Lutheran College in Toowoomba. In 2019, it was relocated to the Googa Outdoor Education Centre, operated by a number of Lutheran organisations, in the Googa State Forest on Nukku Road at Googa Creek (Toowoomba Region). The site of the church in Douglas is marked with a small monument.

== Demographics ==
In the 2016 census, Douglas had a population of 112 people.

In the 2021 census, Douglas had a population of 152 people.

== Economy ==
There are a number of homesteads in the locality, including:

- Greyhurst (27.2921°S 151.8962°E)
- Hillview (27.3404°S 151.9078°E)
- Ky-Lew (27.3313°S 151.9018°E)
- Nargoor (27.2850°S 151.8949°E)
- Yavrabee (27.3404°S 151.8955°E)

== Education ==
There are no schools in Douglas. The nearest government primary school is Goombungee State School in neighbouring Goombungee to the west and Haden State School in Haden to the north-west. The nearest government secondary schools are Crow's Nest State School (to Year 10) in Crows Nest to the north-east and Highfields State Secondary College (to Year 12) in Highfields to the south-east.

== Facilities ==
Douglas Cemetery is on Douglas Plainby Road (27.3182°S 151.9121°E). It is operated by the Toowoomba Regional Council.
