= Jones Gully, Queensland =

Jones Gully
- Suburb
- Interactive map of Jones Gully
- Coordinates: 27.1758°S 152.0072°E
- Country: Australia
- State: Queensland
- LGA: Toowoomba Region
- Location: 13.8 km (8.6 mi) NNW of Crows Nest; 45.3 km (28.1 mi) NNE of Highfields; 57.9 km (36.0 mi) N of Toowoomba CBD; 165 km (103 mi) WNW of Brisbane

Government
  - State electorate: Nanango
  - Federal division: Maranoa

Area
  - Total: 14.1 km^{2} (5.4 sq mi)

Population
  - Total: 15 (2021 census)
  - Density: 1.06/km^{2} (2.76/sq mi)
- Time zone: UTC+10:00 (AEST)
- Postcode: 4355
Suburbs around Jones Gully
Emu Creek	Pierces Creek	Pierces Creek
Glenaven	Jones Gully	Pierces Creek
Glenaven	Pinelands	Mountain Camp

Jones Gully is a rural locality in the Toowoomba Region, Queensland, Australia. In the 2021 census, Jones Gully had a population of 15 people.

== Geography ==
The New England Highway forms a small section of the south-eastern boundary of the locality, entering from and exiting to Glenaven.

The land use is a mixture of grazing on native vegetation and crop growing.

== History ==
Jones Gully State School opened circa 1932 under head teacher Mr H. J. Wootton. It was officially opened on Saturday 12 March 1932 by Arthur Edward Moore, the Queensland Premier. It closed circa 1955 when a larger school was built at Crows Nest to replace a number of small local schools. Jones Gully State School was on the south-eastern corner of Jones Gully Road and Tigell Road (27.1747°S 152.0112°E).

== Demographics ==
In the 2016 census, Jones Gully had a population of 14 people.

In the 2021 census, Jones Gully had a population of 15 people.

== Education ==
There are no schools in Jones Gully. The nearest government primary schools are Crow's Nest State School in Crows Nest to the south-east and Haden State School in Haden to the south-west. The nearest government secondary schools are Crow's Nest State School (to Year 10) and Highfields State Secondary College (to Year 12) in Highfields to the south.
