= Upper Pinelands, Queensland =

Upper Pinelands
- Suburb
- Interactive map of Upper Pinelands
- Coordinates: 27.2213°S 151.9594°E
- Country: Australia
- State: Queensland
- LGA: Toowoomba Region
- Location: 13.3 km (8.3 mi) NW of Crows Nest; 51.5 km (32.0 mi) N of Toowoomba; 164 km (102 mi) WNW of Brisbane

Government
  - State electorate: Condamine
  - Federal division: Maranoa

Area
  - Total: 18.9 km^{2} (7.3 sq mi)

Population
  - Total: 49 (2021 census)
  - Density: 2.59/km^{2} (6.71/sq mi)
- Time zone: UTC+10:00 (AEST)
- Postcode: 4355
Suburbs around Upper Pinelands
| Djuan | Glenaven | Glenaven |
| Djuan | Upper Pinelands | Pinelands |
| Bergen | Plainby | Pinelands |

Upper Pinelands is a rural locality in the Toowoomba Region, Queensland, Australia. In the 2021 census, Upper Pinelands had a population of 49 people.

== History ==
Pinelands Upper State School opened circa 1922 and closed circa 1946. It was at 57 Roberts Road (corner of Butters Lane, 27.2315°S 151.9701°E).

== Demographics ==
In the 2016 census, Upper Pinelands had a population of 33 people.

In the 2021 census, Upper Pinelands had a population of 49 people.

== Education ==
There are no schools in Pinelands. The nearest government primary schools are Haden State School in Haden to the west and Crow's Nest State School in Crows Nest to the east. The nearest government secondary schools are Crow's Nest State School (to Year 10) and Highfields State Secondary College (to Year 12) in Highfields, Toowoomba, to the south.
