= Djuan, Queensland =

Djuan
- Suburb
- Interactive map of Djuan
- Coordinates: 27.1805°S 151.9102°E
- Country: Australia
- State: Queensland
- LGA: Toowoomba Region
- Location: 20.7 km (12.9 mi) NW of Crows Nest; 40.0 km (24.9 mi) N of Highfields; 52.5 km (32.6 mi) N of Toowoomba CBD; 171 km (106 mi) WNW of Brisbane

Government
  - State electorate: Condamine
  - Federal division: Maranoa

Area
  - Total: 49.2 km^{2} (19.0 sq mi)

Population
  - Total: 93 (2021 census)
  - Density: 1.890/km^{2} (4.896/sq mi)
- Time zone: UTC+10:00 (AEST)
- Postcode: 4352
Suburbs around Djuan
Coalbank	Coalbank	Emu Creek
Doctor Creek	Djuan	Glenaven
Haden	Bergen	Upper Pinelands

Djuan is a rural locality in the Toowoomba Region, Queensland, Australia. In the 2021 census, Djuan had a population of 93 people.

== Geography ==
The locality is bounded to the west by the Great Dividing Range.

== History ==
The locality takes its name from an Aboriginal name for the grey forest possum.

Djuan Provisional School opened on 14 November 1895. On 1 January 1909, it became Djuan State School. It closed in 1969. It was on a 3-acre (1.2 ha) site on the bend of Djuan Road (27.18168°S 151.92303°E).

On 19 November 1901, a Methodist church opened in Djuan.

== Demographics ==
In the 2016 census, Djuan had a population of 100 people.

In the 2021 census, Djuan had a population of 93 people.

== Education ==
There are no schools in Djuan. The nearest government primary school is Haden State School in neighbouring Haden to the south-west. The nearest government secondary schools are Crow's Nest State School (to Year 10) in Crows Nest to the south-east and Highfields State Secondary College (to Year 12) in Highfields to the south.
