= Groomsville, Queensland =

Groomsville
- Suburb
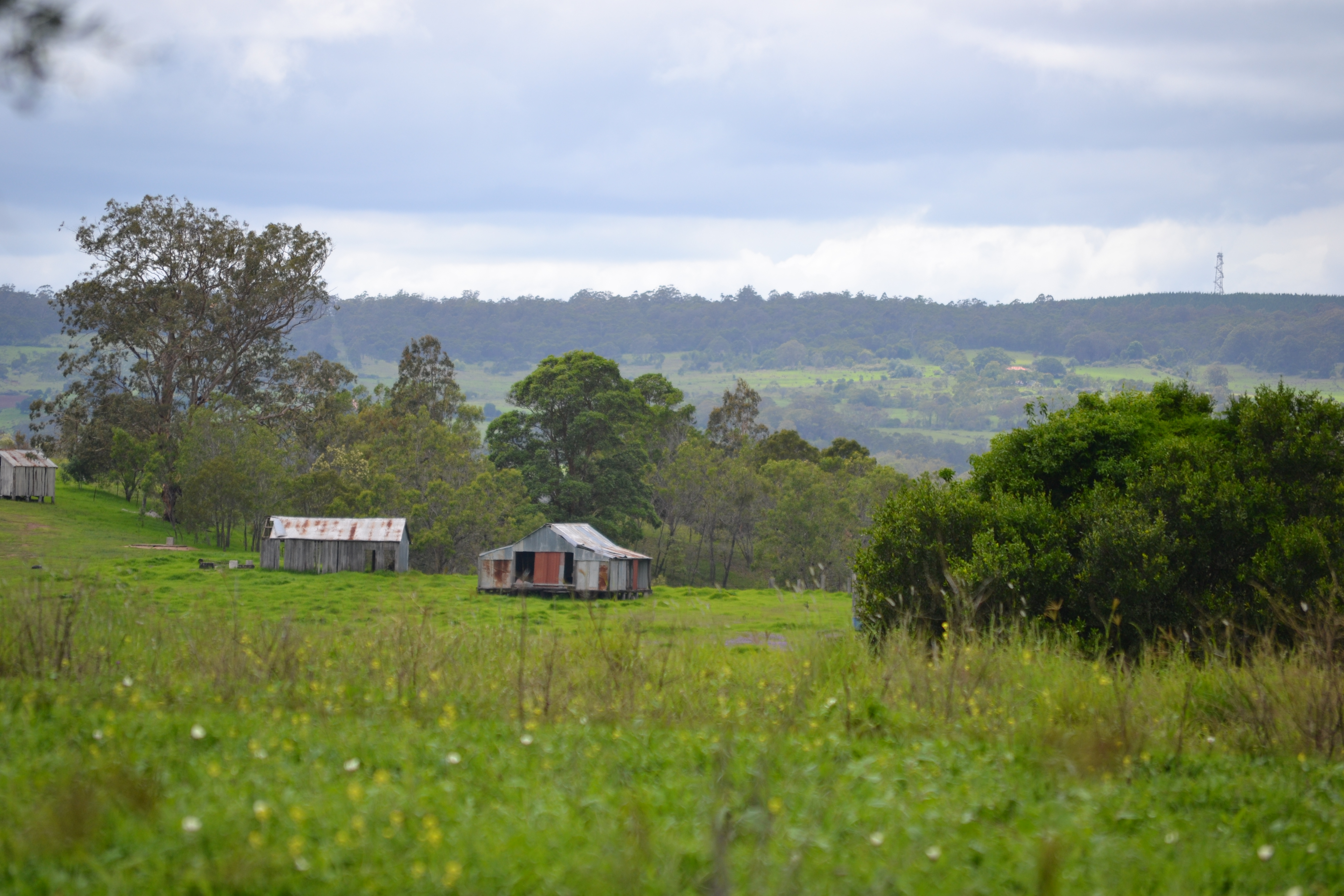
- View over farmland at Groomsville looking east towards Pechey Forestry from Green Acres Road, 2015

- Interactive map of Groomsville
- Coordinates: 27.3408°S 151.9636°E
- Country: Australia
- State: Queensland
- LGA: Toowoomba Region
- Location: 11.0 km (6.8 mi) E of Goombungee; 15.4 km (9.6 mi) WSW of Crows Nest; 22.6 km (14.0 mi) N of Highfields; 34.7 km (21.6 mi) N of Toowoomba CBD; 165 km (103 mi) WNW of Brisbane

Government
  - State electorate: Condamine
  - Federal divisions: Groom; Maranoa

Area
  - Total: 59.5 km^{2} (23.0 sq mi)
- Elevation: 450–720 m (1,480–2,360 ft)

Population
  - Total: 132 (2021 census)
  - Density: 2.218/km^{2} (5.746/sq mi)
- Time zone: UTC+10:00 (AEST)
- Postcode: 4352
Suburbs around Groomsville
Douglas	Plainby; Whichello	Pechey
Douglas	Groomsville	Merritts Creek
Meringandan	Kleinton	Geham

Groomsville is a rural locality in the Toowoomba Region on the Darling Downs, Queensland, Australia. In the 2021 census, Groomsville had a population of 132 people.

== Geography ==
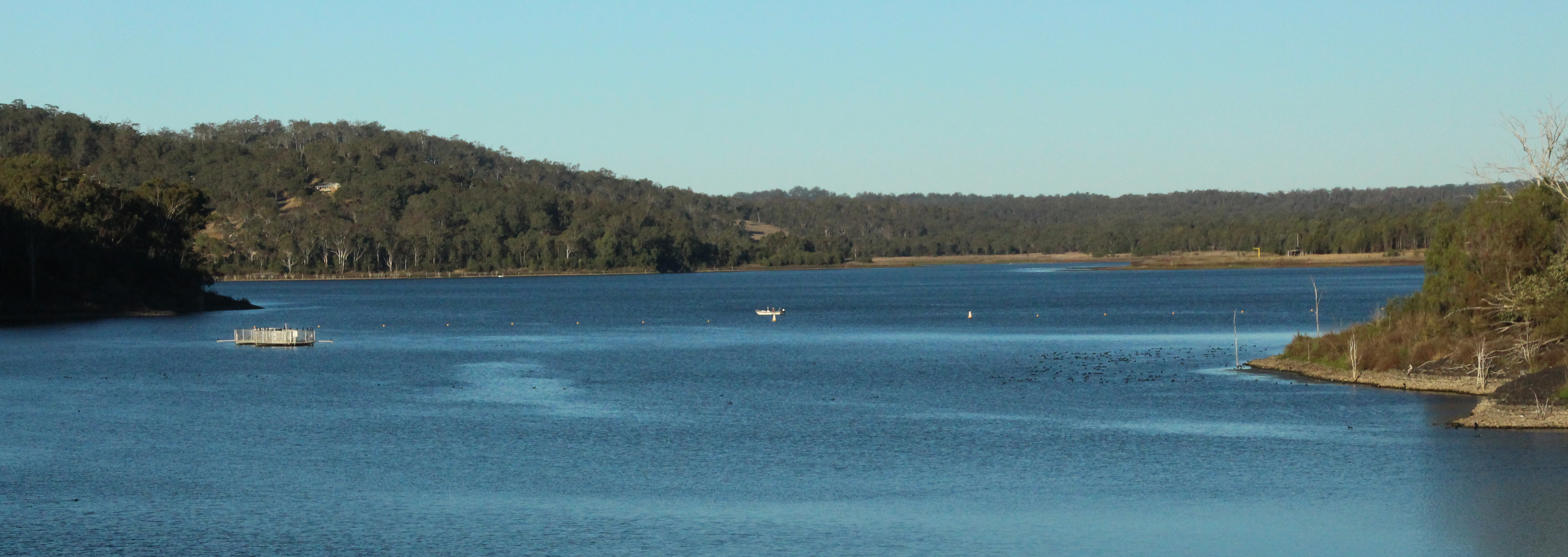
Cooby Creek Reservoir

The locality is bounded to the south-east by Cooby Creek, to the south by the Cooby Creek Reservoir (the impoundment of the creek), and to the south-west by Cooby Creek now beyond the wall of the Cooby Dam.

The Pechey-Maclagan Road runs through from north-east to north-west, while Groomsville Road runs to the south-east.

The land use is almost entirely grazing on native vegetation.

== History ==
Jericho Estate Provisional School opened on 29 May 1906. In 1908, it was renamed Groomsville Provisional School. On 1 January 1909, it became Groomsville State School. The school closed in 1951. It was on a 2-acre (0.81 ha) site at 845 Pechey Maclagan Road (27.31475°S 151.96649°E).

Cooby Dam was constructed between 1938 and 1941 making Cooby Creek Reservoir the first water supply dam for Toowoomba.

== Demographics ==
In the 2016 census, Groomsville had a population of 113 people.

In the 2021 census, Groomsville had a population of 132 people.

== Education ==
There are no schools in Groomsville. The nearest government primary schools are Geham State School in neighbouring Geham to the south-east, Goombungee State School in Goombungee to the west, and Crow's Nest State School in Crows Nest to the north-east. The nearest government secondary school is Crow's Nest State School (to Year 10). For Years 11 and 12, the nearest government secondary school is Highfields State Secondary College in Highfields to the south.

== Amenities ==
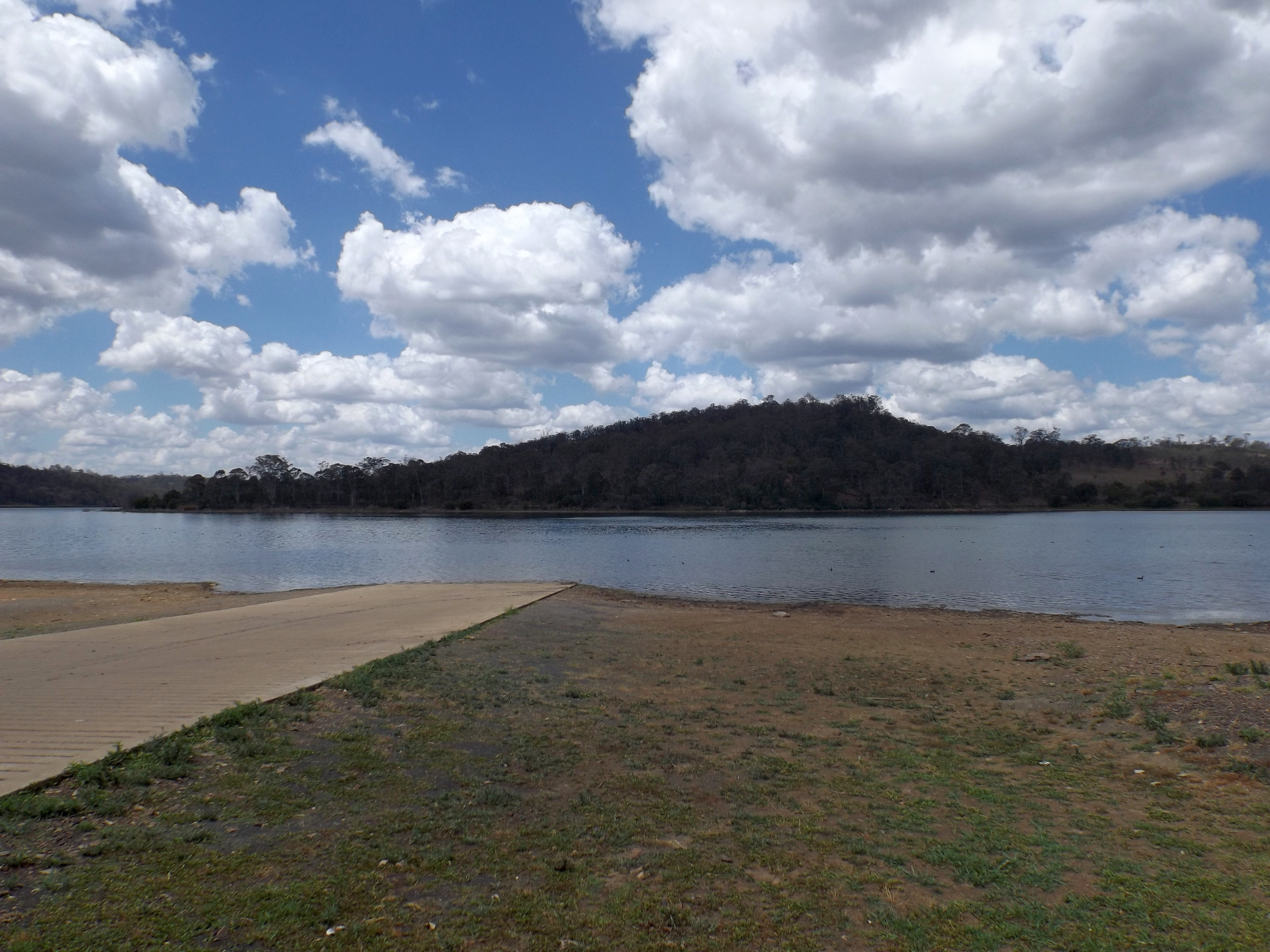
Boat ramp, 2014

There is a boat ramp into the Cooby Creek Reservoir at Cooby Dam Road (27.3900°S 151.9432°E). Although the boat ramp is within Groomsville, it must be accessed via neighbouring Meringandan or Kleinton. The boat ramp is managed by the Toowoomba Regional Council.
