= Bergen, Queensland =

Bergen
- Suburb
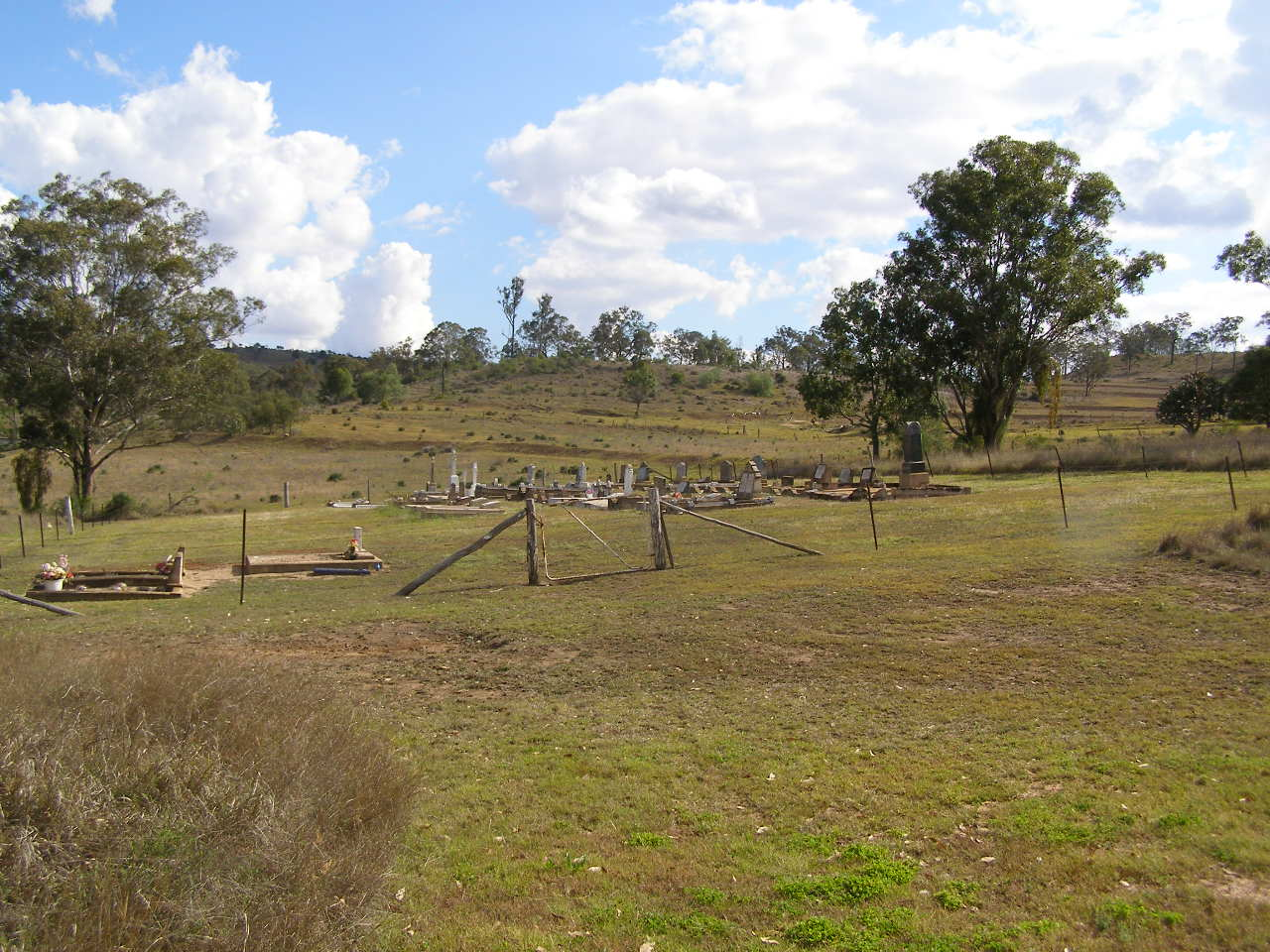
- Bergen Djuan cemetery, 2006

- Interactive map of Bergen
- Coordinates: 27.24°S 151.9208°E
- Country: Australia
- State: Queensland
- LGA: Toowoomba Region
- Location: 7.8 km (4.8 mi) NE of Goombungee; 7.9 km (4.9 mi) S of Haden; 21.5 km (13.4 mi) W of Crows Nest; 40.3 km (25.0 mi) N of Toowoomba; 165 km (103 mi) WNW of Brisbane

Government
  - State electorate: Condamine
  - Federal divisions: Groom; Maranoa

Area
  - Total: 20.2 km^{2} (7.8 sq mi)

Population
  - Total: 85 (2021 census)
  - Density: 4.21/km^{2} (10.90/sq mi)
- Time zone: UTC+10:00 (AEST)
- Postcode: 4353
Suburbs around Bergen
Haden	Djuan	Upper Pinelands
Goombungee	Bergen	Plainby
Goombungee	Douglas	Plainby

Bergen (German: [ˈbɛʁɡn̩] BEHR-gen) is a rural locality in the Toowoomba Region, Queensland, Australia. In the 2021 census, Bergen had a population of 85 people.

Neuve is a neighbourhood in the south-west of the locality.

== Geography ==
Neuve is a neighbourhood (27.2666°S 151.8833°E) within the south-west of locality. It takes its name from a former railway station.

== History ==
The Haden railway line from Kingsthorpe to Goobungee and Haden opened in 1910 with Bergen being served by a station called Bergenside (27.2608°S 151.8906°E).

In 1914 a cemetery was established, operated by a group of trustees. The cemetery had separate sections for a number of religious denominations (Anglican, Roman Catholic, Lutheran, Presbyterian, Methodist and Baptist) and a general section. In 1982 responsibility for the cemetery was given to the Crows Nest Shire Council, and became the responsibility of the Toowoomba Regional Council following the local government amalgamations in 2008.

During World War I, due to anti-German sentiment, the Rosalie Shire Council (headquartered at Goombungee) requested that the Bergenside railway station be renamed. On 14 August 1916 the Queensland Railways Department renamed it Neuve after Neuve Chapelle in France where the Battle of Neuve Chapelle had taken place in March 1915.

Bergen Provisional School opened on 3 August 1896. On 20 January 1902 it became Bergen State School. It closed on 31 December 1969. It was on Gomoran Bergen Road (approx 27.2567°S 151.9062°E).

The Haden railway line closed in 1964.

== Demographics ==
In the 2016 census, Bergen had a population of 68 people.

In the 2021 census, Bergen had a population of 85 people.

== Education ==
There are no schools in Bergen. The nearest government primary schools are Haden State School in neighbouring Haden to the north-west and Goombungee State School in neighbouring Goombungee to the south-west. For secondary education, the nearest government schools are Crow's Nest State School (to Year 10) in Crows Nest to the east and Highfields State College (to Year 12) in Highfields to the south.

== Amenities ==
The Bergen Djuan Cemetery is on Bergen Road (corner Menkins Road, 27.2350°S 151.9226°E). It is operated by the Toowoomba Regional Council.
