= Pinelands, Queensland =

Pinelands
- Suburb
- Interactive map of Pinelands
- Coordinates: 27.2305°S 152.0038°E
- Country: Australia
- State: Queensland
- LGA: Toowoomba Region
- Location: 7.9 km (4.9 mi) NW of Crows Nest; 51.5 km (32.0 mi) N of Toowoomba; 159 km (99 mi) WNW of Brisbane

Government
  - State electorate: Condamine
  - Federal division: Maranoa

Area
  - Total: 27.8 km^{2} (10.7 sq mi)

Population
  - Total: 81 (2021 census)
  - Density: 2.914/km^{2} (7.55/sq mi)
- Time zone: UTC+10:00 (AEST)
- Postcode: 4355
Suburbs around Pinelands
Glenaven	Jones Gully	Mountain Camp
Upper Pinelands	Pinelands	Crows Nest
Plainby	Plainby	Crows Nest

Pinelands is a rural locality in the Toowoomba Region, Queensland, Australia. In the 2021 census, Pinelands had a population of 81 people.

== Geography ==
The New England Highway passes through from south-east to north.

== History ==
In November 1893, the Pine Lands Estate was auctioned off in 40-acre (16 ha) blocks, a total of "9000 acres of the richest farm land in Australia".

Pinelands Provisional School opened on 17 October 1904. On 1 January 1909, it became Pinelands State School. It closed in 1960. It was at 6778 New England Highway (27.2417°S 152.0104°E).

St Catherine's Anglican Church was dedicated on Sunday 19 September 1909. It was on land donated by Chas Brewer. Its last service was held on 15 April 1951; 70 people attended and held a picnic after the service. The land was sold in 1953.

Pinelands Methodist Church opened on Sunday 21 July 1912. It has closed and been demolished.

== Demographics ==
In the 2016 census, Pinelands had a population of 86 people.

In the 2021 census, Pinelands had a population of 81 people.

== Education ==
There are no schools in Pinelands. The nearest government primary schools are Crow's Nest State School in neighbouring Crows Nest to the east and Haden State School in Haden to the west. The nearest government secondary schools are Crow's Nest State School (to Year 10) and Highfields State Secondary College (to Year 12) in Highfields, Toowoomba, to the south.

== Amenities ==
Pinelands Public Hall is at 6619 New England Highway (27.2269°S 152.0110°E).
