= Plainby, Queensland =

Plainby
- Suburb
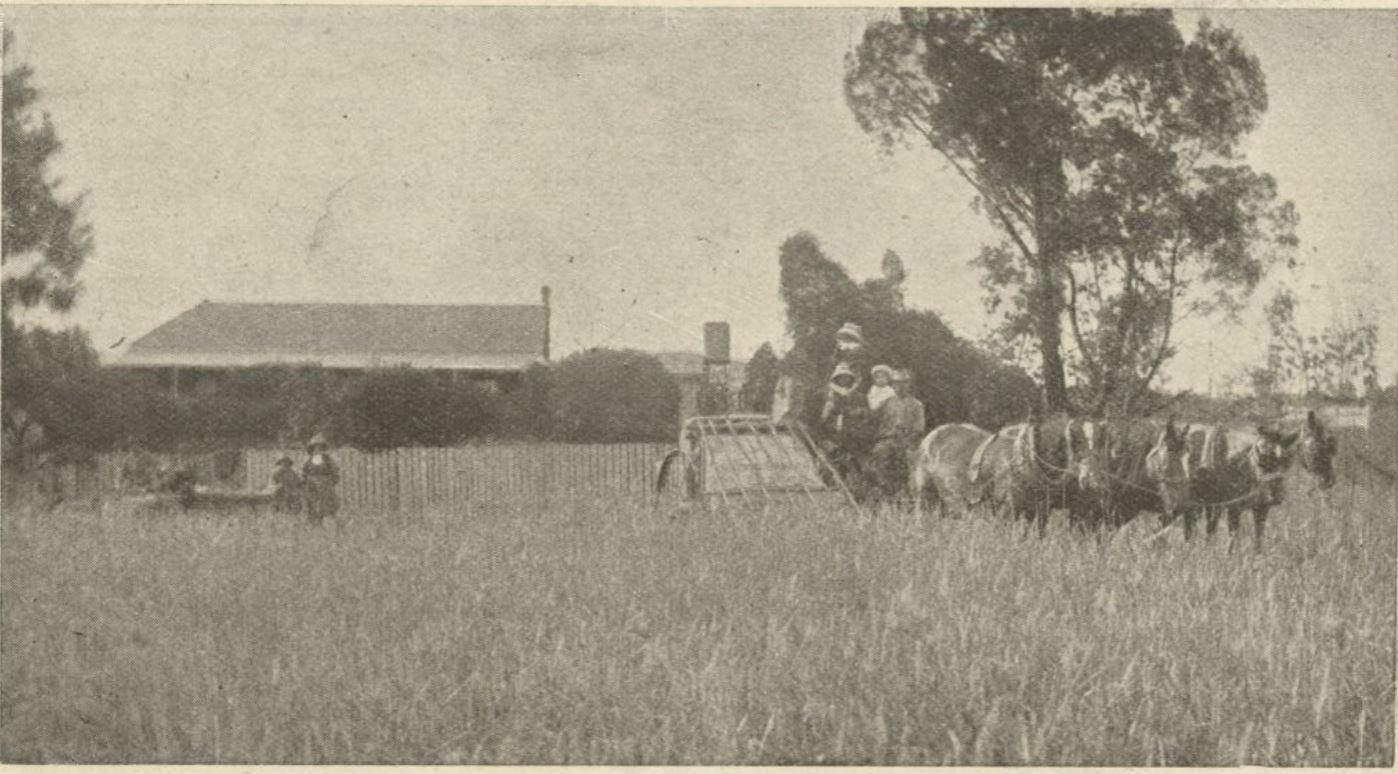
- Harvester setting to work on 215 acres of Barley, Plainby, 1915

- Interactive map of Plainby
- Coordinates: 27.27°S 151.9713°E
- Country: Australia
- State: Queensland
- LGA: Toowoomba Region
- Location: 11.5 km (7.1 mi) W of Crows Nest; 31.4 km (19.5 mi) N of Highfields; 43.8 km (27.2 mi) N of Toowoomba CBD; 162 km (101 mi) WNW of Brisbane

Government
  - State electorate: Condamine
  - Federal divisions: Maranoa; Groom

Area
  - Total: 38.1 km^{2} (14.7 sq mi)

Population
  - Total: 56 (2021 census)
  - Density: 1.470/km^{2} (3.81/sq mi)
- Time zone: UTC+10:00 (AEST)
- Postcode: 4355
Suburbs around Plainby
Upper Pinelands	Upper Pinelands	Pinelands
Bergen	Plainby	Crows Nest
Douglas	Douglas	Whichello; Groomsville

Plainby is a rural locality in the Toowoomba Region, Queensland, Australia. In the 2021 census, Plainby had a population of 56 people.

== History ==
The locality takes its name from its school.

A United Methodist Church opened in August 1900. The "neat little building" was 30 by 26 feet (9.1 by 7.9 m) and built by Joseph Butters of Toowoomba. Over 300 people attended the opening. It was on a 1-acre (0.40 ha) site at 130 Swain Road (27.25572°S 151.95579°E). The building is no longer extant.

Plainby Provisional School opened circa 1889. On 1 January 1909, it became Plainby State School. It closed in 1959. It was Plainby Provisional School opened circa 1889. On 1 January 1909, it became Plainby State School. It closed in 1959. It was on a 2-acre-2-rood (1.0 ha) site at 772 Plainby Road (27.27102°S 151.95258°E).

== Demographics ==
In the 2016 census, Plainby had a population of 44 people.

In the 2021 census, Plainby had a population of 56 people.

== Education ==
There are no schools in Plainby. The nearest government primary schools are Crow's Nest State School in neighbouring Crows Nest to the east, Haden State School in Haden to the north-west, and Goombungee State School in Goombungee to the south-west. The nearest government secondary schools are Crow's Nest State School (to Year 10) and Highfields State Secondary College in Highfields to the south.
