= Crows Nest Post Office =

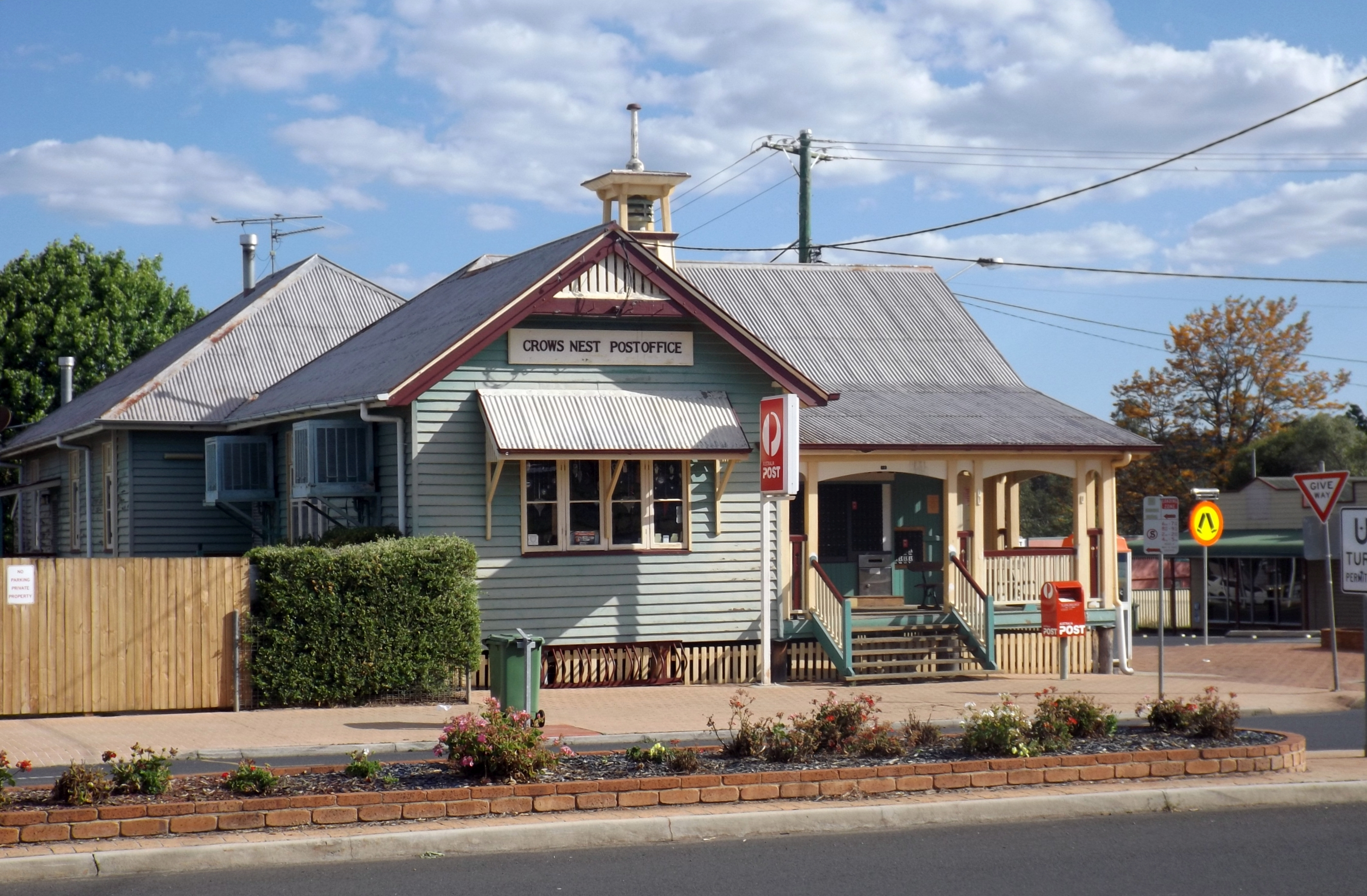
- Building in 2014

- Location within Queensland Location within Australia
- 27.2622°S 152.0558°E
- Location: 19 Curnow Street, Crows Nest, Toowoomba Region, Queensland, Australia

History
- Design period: 1900–1914 (early 20th century)
- Built: 1911–1911

Queensland Heritage Register
- Official name: Crows Nest Post Office
- Type: state heritage (built)
- Designated: 27 June 2003
- Reference no.: 602403
- Significant period: 1911 (fabric)
- Significant components: residential accommodation – post master's house/quarters, post & telegraph office

Crows Nest Post Office is a heritage-listed post office at 19 Curnow Street, Crows Nest, Toowoomba Region, Queensland, Australia. It was built in 1911. It was added to the Queensland Heritage Register on 27 June 2003.

== History ==
Crows Nest Post Office was constructed in 1911 and is the second purpose built post office in the town, which is the centre of a rural area whose industry is based on cattle and sheep and increasingly, on tourism.

In 1843 Campbell McDonald of Durandan run took out a depasturing licence for the Crows Nest area and in 1849 James Canning Pearce took up the first pastoral license. His head station comprised huts, yards and a large fenced paddock. The run passed through a number of owners before being acquired by WB Tooth in 1858. In 1868, under the Crown Lands Alienation Act, Tooth gained a lease for half of the run, the rest being resumed by the Crown and opened up for closer settlement.

The Crow's Nest station was unsuccessful and was abandoned; the lease was forfeited for non-payment of rent and the land opened for selection in 1875. Two timber reserves of 960 acres (390 ha) and 5,665 acres (2,293 ha) were declared and in 1876 reserves for a township and cemetery were made. Settlement at Crows Nest was begun in the vicinity of the station homestead, which is thought to have been near the present police station. The town was surveyed in February 1877 and the first land sale was held in April of that year. A hotel was erected soon afterwards and a Court of Petty Sessions was instituted with J T Littleton, a local landholder, as Police Magistrate. A telegraph office was opened on 17 October 1877 and in 1878 a post office was opened in the same modestly scaled premises, which were situated in Albert Street.

In 1886 a branch railway line from Toowoomba reached Crows Nest, its purpose being to principally to provide transport for timber from the Crows Nest and Pechey area, but also to encourage the development of farming and dairying along its route. Becoming the railhead for such a line made Crows Nest an important commercial centre but the railway initially caused some problems because the line passed the settlement at a point north of the town centre. As a consequence the business centre shifted closer to the railway station, a large paddock in the vicinity having been purchased and subdivided for sale by the time of the station's opening. The post office moved to the railway station in December 1886 and for some time the station master performed postal duties, a common arrangement in small centres where the railway station was the focus of communications and movement of goods.

The area thrived and the township developed quickly in the early 1900s. In 1905 two banks opened branches in Crows Nest and a newspaper, the "Crow's Nest Record" was established. A butter and bacon factory was built and there were several sawmills in the area, including a large planing factory built in 1907. In 1906, Percy Gargett, a newsagent, won the contract to conduct postal, telegraph and telephone services at Crows Nest and had a building constructed in Curnow Street next to McDiarmid's store.

Although in 1901 the Commonwealth Post Master General's Dept was created, transfer of responsibility from the colonies to new organizations was gradual. The Commonwealth administration upgraded buildings and facilities in towns associated with agricultural and pastoral expansion, such as Crows Nest. New post offices were built in some towns and others had facilities upgraded. In 1911, an official post office, the current building, was constructed at the corner of Curnow and Toowoomba Road, conveniently close to the railway station. The new post office was built to a standard type designed by the Queensland Works Department. A timber building with a single porch and gable and a lantern surmounting the roof, it was a variation of the form that became one of the most readily identifiable post office styles. Post office buildings constructed in Queensland between 1906 and 1921 achieved a high standard of design and construction and architecturally, the porch and gable type is significant for the quality of construction and detail, for the resolution of climatic considerations, and for the visual appeal of its form. While the buildings referred to a standard type, designs for individual post offices were modified to suit each site and local needs. 13 post offices of this type were constructed between 1909 and 1913, mainly to serve small towns in South East Queensland. Not all of these survive and some are no longer post offices.

Crows Nest thrived and by 1921 had a population of over a thousand people, close to the present population level. The railway closed in 1961 and the track, buildings and yards were removed, the land being used for other purposes, including a park.

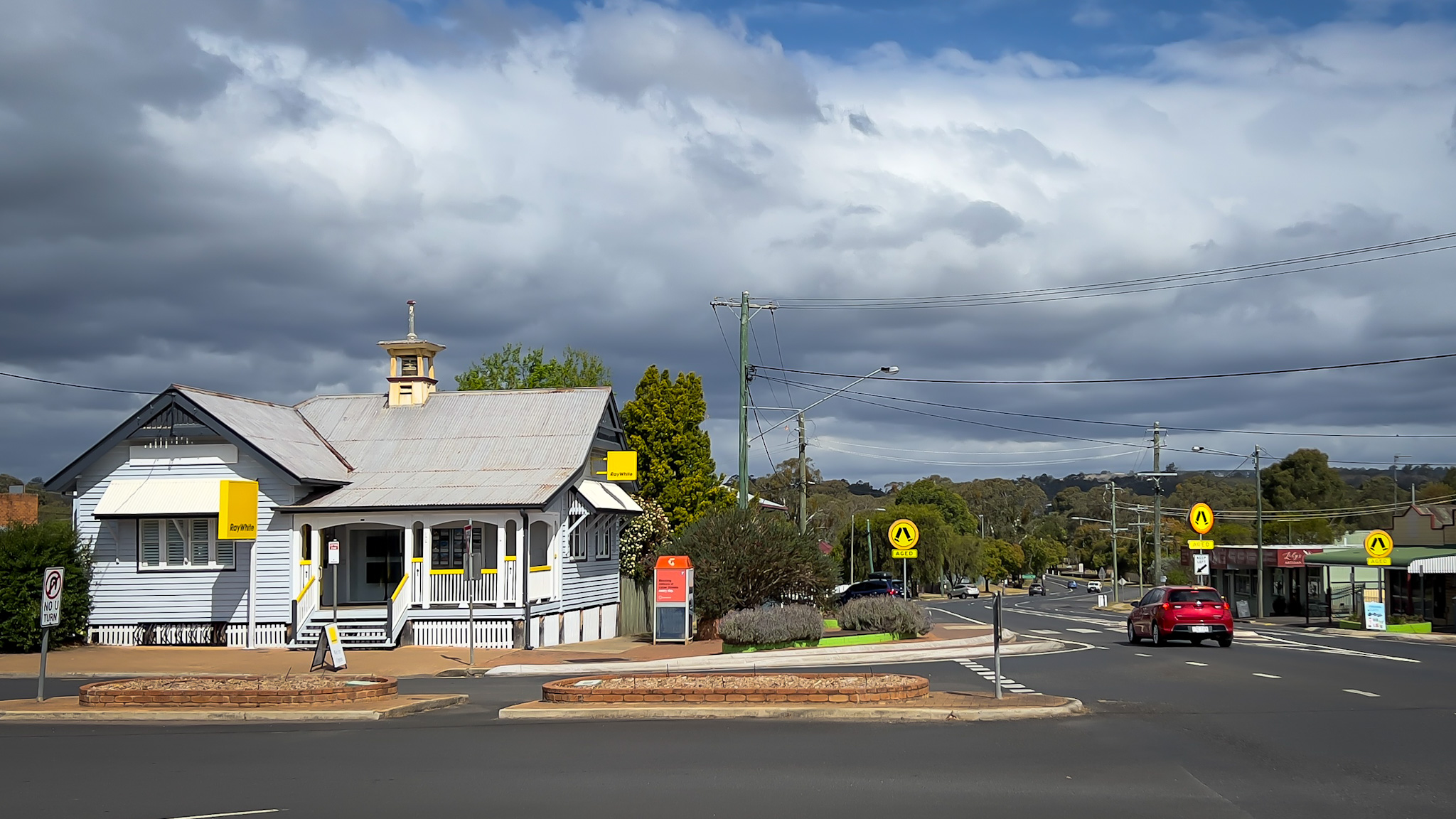
Former post office, now real estate agent, 2023

The post office building now operates as a privately owned real estate business.

== Description ==
The Crows Nest Post Office is a single storey timber building set on low stumps and is located prominently on the corner of Curnow Street and Toowoomba Road. It is the type identified as T18 by the National Estate Study of Historic Post Offices in Queensland, being an intact single porch and gable post office with frontages to both streets.

The post office has a gabled roof clad in corrugated iron with a decorative lantern on the roof ridge. The northern elevation has a projecting gable with an adjoining porch, over which the main roof is extended and is supported by paired timber posts. The main entrance is through the porch and is reached by stairs with timber handrails. There is a bank of triple sash windows in the gable and a sun hood shades these. Banks of windows are on either side of the building, those on the western side also shaded by a hood.

The interior of the building is lined with painted tongue and groove boards and has a high ceiling. Changes, such as a more modern counter, appear to be minor.

To the rear of the post office is the residence. This is a high set timber building with a hipped roof clad in corrugated iron. The elevation facing the street has pairs of casement windows above a low timber wall that appears to be an early adaptation of a verandah. The main entrance is currently on the eastern side of the building, which has windows of a form similar to those on the post office.

== Heritage listing ==
Crows Nest Post Office was listed on the Queensland Heritage Register on 27 June 2003 having satisfied the following criteria.

The place is important in demonstrating the evolution or pattern of Queensland's history.

Crows Nest Post Office is important in illustrating the pattern of Queensland history, being a facility erected during the period before the First World War when the new Commonwealth government made a policy of upgrading postal services to developing agricultural and pastoral communities. It reflects the growth of Crows Nest and its importance as a railhead and commercial centre for the surrounding district in the early years of the 20th century.

The place is important in demonstrating the principal characteristics of a particular class of cultural places.

Crows Nest Post Office is important in illustrating the principal characteristics of a timber porch and gable post office building of the period 1906–1921, designed by the Queensland Works Department, which was instrumental in improving the quality of building design and construction in Queensland.

The place is important because of its aesthetic significance.

Crows Nest Post Office has aesthetic significance as a well-designed and distinctive public building. Its position with elevations to both Curnow Street, and Toowoomba Road makes it prominent in the townscape of Crows Nest to which it makes an important visual contribution.

The place has a strong or special association with a particular community or cultural group for social, cultural or spiritual reasons.

Crows Nest Post Office has had a long connection with the people of Crows Nest and the surrounding district as a provider of communication services that have been conducted from this building since 1911 until the present time.
