= Mountain Camp, Queensland =

Mountain Camp
- Suburb
- Interactive map of Mountain Camp
- Coordinates: 27.2030°S 152.0363°E
- Country: Australia
- State: Queensland
- LGA: Toowoomba Region
- Location: 7.1 km (4.4 mi) N of Crows Nest; 38.7 km (24.0 mi) NNE of Highfields; 51.2 km (31.8 mi) NNE of Toowoomba CBD; 161 km (100 mi) WNW of Brisbane

Government
  - State electorate: Nanango
  - Federal division: Maranoa

Area
  - Total: 9.1 km^{2} (3.5 sq mi)

Population
  - Total: 24 (2021 census)
  - Density: 2.64/km^{2} (6.83/sq mi)
- Time zone: UTC+10:00 (AEST)
- Postcode: 4355
Suburbs around Mountain Camp
Jones Gully	Pierces Creek	Pierces Creek
Jones Gully	Mountain Camp	Crows Nest
Pinelands	Crows Nest	Crows Nest

Mountain Camp is a rural locality in the Toowoomba Region, Queensland, Australia. In the 2021 census, Mountain Camp had a population of 24 people.

== Geography ==
Pierces Creek Road forms the eastern boundary of the locality with Jones Gully Road commencing at the boundary and proceeding in a north-westerly direction through the locality, after which it forms the north-western boundary of the locality.

Two Tree Hill is in the north-west of the locality (27.1953°S 152.0210°E), rising to 664 metres (2,178 ft) above sea level.

The land use is predominantly grazing on native vegetation with some crop growing and rural residential housing.

== Demographics ==
In the 2016 census, Mountain Camp had a population of 24 people.

In the 2021 census, Mountain Camp had a population of 24 people.

== Education ==
There are no schools in Mountain Camp. The nearest government primary school is Crow's Nest State School in neighbouring Crows Nest to the south. The nearest government secondary school is Crow's Nest State School (to Year 10) and Highfields State Secondary College (to Year 12) in Highfields to the south-west.
