= Pierces Creek, Queensland =

Pierces Creek
- Suburb
- Interactive map of Pierces Creek
- Coordinates: 27.1627°S 152.0369°E
- Country: Australia
- State: Queensland
- LGA: Toowoomba Region
- Location: 14.3 km (8.9 mi) N of Crows Nest; 45.8 km (28.5 mi) NE of Highfields; 57.9 km (36.0 mi) N of Toowoomba CBD; 165 km (103 mi) WNW of Brisbane

Government
  - State electorate: Nanango
  - Federal division: Maranoa

Area
  - Total: 40.3 km^{2} (15.6 sq mi)

Population
  - Total: 95 (2021 census)
  - Density: 2.357/km^{2} (6.11/sq mi)
- Time zone: UTC+10:00 (AEST)
- Postcode: 4355
Suburbs around Pierces Creek
Emu Creek	Emu Creek	Anduramba
Jones Gully	Pierces Creek	Anduramba
Jones Gully	Mountain Camp	Crows Nest

Pierces Creek is a rural locality in the Toowoomba Region, Queensland, Australia. It was formerly known as Virginia. In the 2021 census, Pierces Creek had a population of 95 people.

== History ==
The locality was originally named Pierce Creek but it was renamed Pierces Creek in 2005. It appears on a 1944 map as Virginia.

Virginia Provisional School opened on 12 October 1908 and became Virginia State School in 1909. In 1918 it was renamed Pierce Creek State School. It closed on 18 October 1959. It was on the western side of Pierces Creek Road south of the junction with Middle Road (approx 27.1900°S 152.0631°E).

St Faith's Anglican Church in Pechey was dedicated on 10 September 1911 by the Venerable Archdeacon Arthur Rivers. In February 1931 it was relocated to Virginia (now Pierces Creek), where it was re-dedicated on 1 March 1930 by Archdeacon Glover. It was on the western side of Pierces Creek Road near the junction with Middle Road (approx 27.1887°S 152.0618°E).

== Demographics ==
In the 2016 census, Pierces Creek had a population of 70 people.

In the 2021 census, Pierces Creek had a population of 95 people.

== Education ==
There are no schools in Pierces Creek. The nearest government primary school is Crow's Nest State School in neighbouring Crows Nest to the south-east. The nearest government secondary schools are Crow's Nest State School (to Year 10) and Highfields State Secondary College (to Year 12) in Highfields to the south-west.
