= Whichello, Queensland =

Whichello
- Suburb
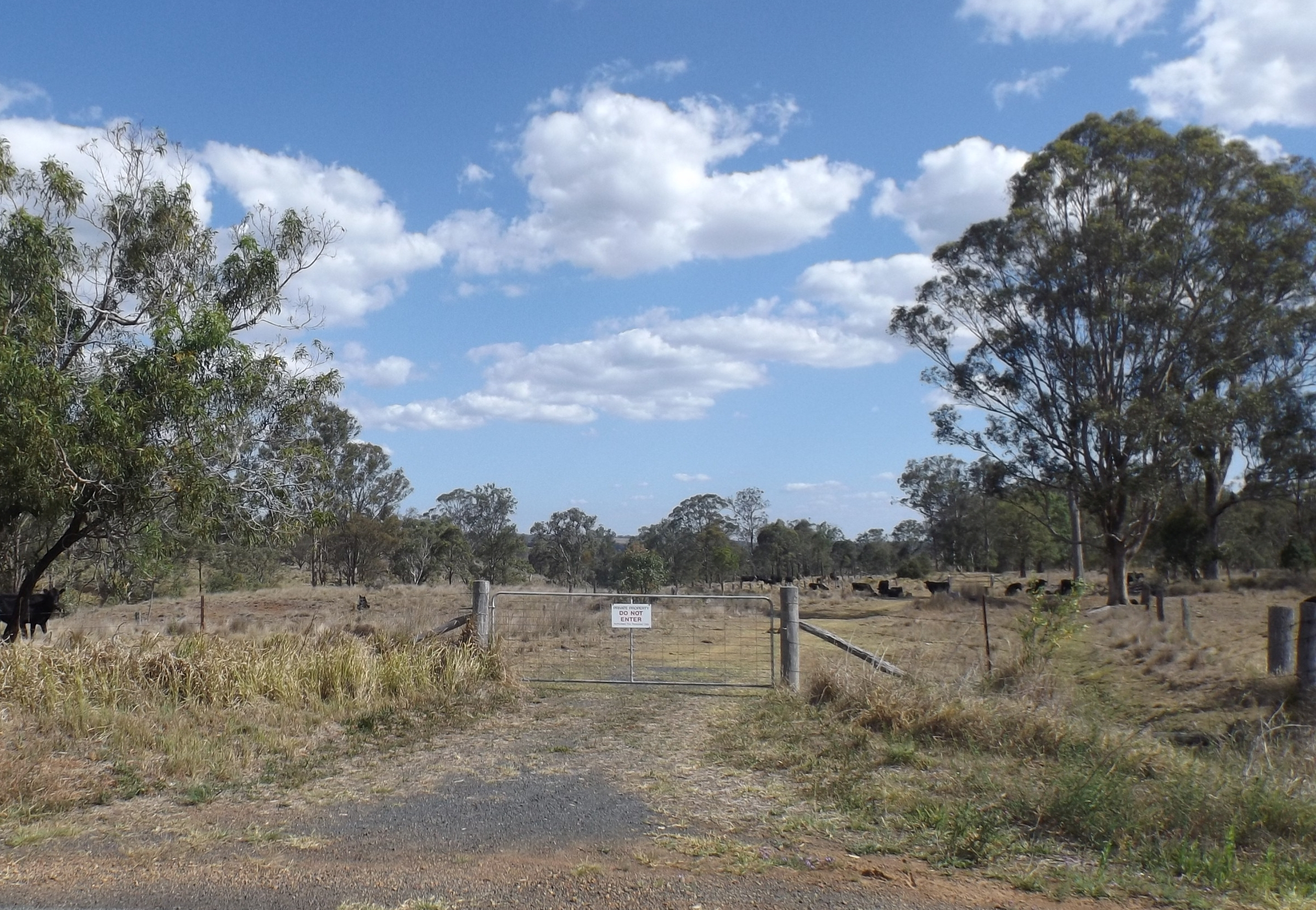
- Paddock along Pechey Maclagan Road, 2014

- Interactive map of Whichello
- Coordinates: 27.2941°S 151.9980°E
- Country: Australia
- State: Queensland
- LGA: Toowoomba Region
- Location: 10.4 km (6.5 mi) SW of Crows Nest; 29.1 km (18.1 mi) NNE of Highfields; 44.1 km (27.4 mi) N of Toowoomba CBD; 154 km (96 mi) WNW of Brisbane

Government
  - State electorate: Condamine
  - Federal division: Maranoa

Area
  - Total: 11.7 km^{2} (4.5 sq mi)

Population
  - Total: 31 (2021 census)
  - Density: 2.65/km^{2} (6.86/sq mi)
- Time zone: UTC+10:00 (AEST)
- Postcode: 4352
Suburbs around Whichello
Plainby	Plainby	Crows Nest
Plainby	Whichello	Pechey
Groomsville	Groomsville	Pechey

Whichello is a rural locality in the Toowoomba Region, Queensland, Australia. In the 2021 census, Whichello had a population of 31 people.

== Geography ==
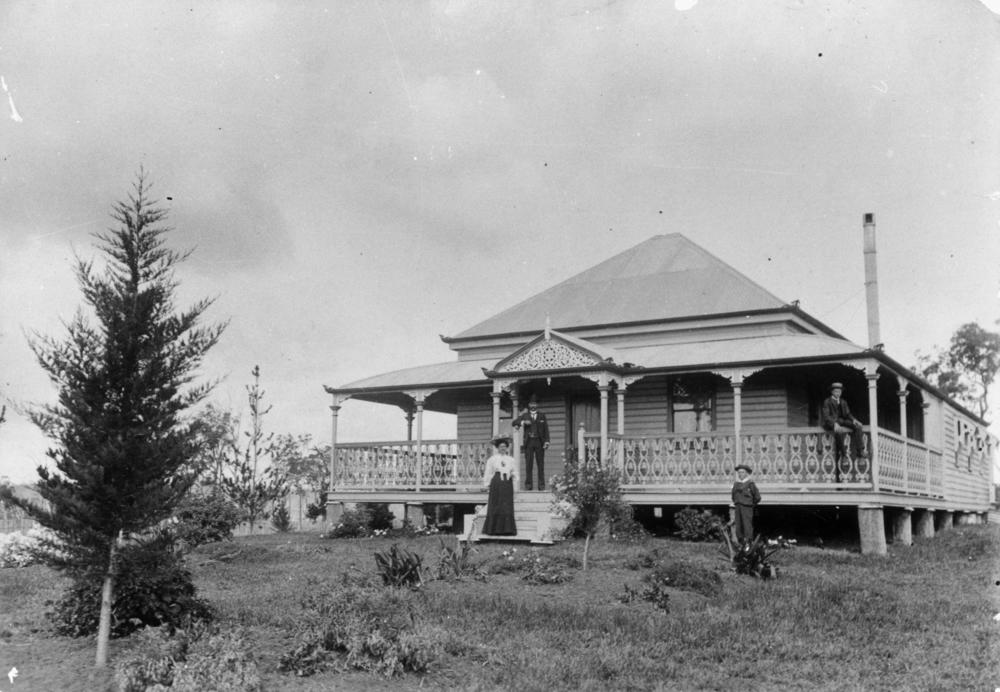
McLean family homestead, Whichello, circa 1903

Whichello is on the Darling Downs in southern Queensland. It is bounded to the north-east by the Great Dividing Range.

The terrain ranges from 560 to 75 metres (1,837 to 246 ft) above sea level. The land use is predominantly grazing on native vegetation with some crop growing.

The Pechey-Maclagan Road runs through from east (Pechey) to south (Groomsville).

== History ==
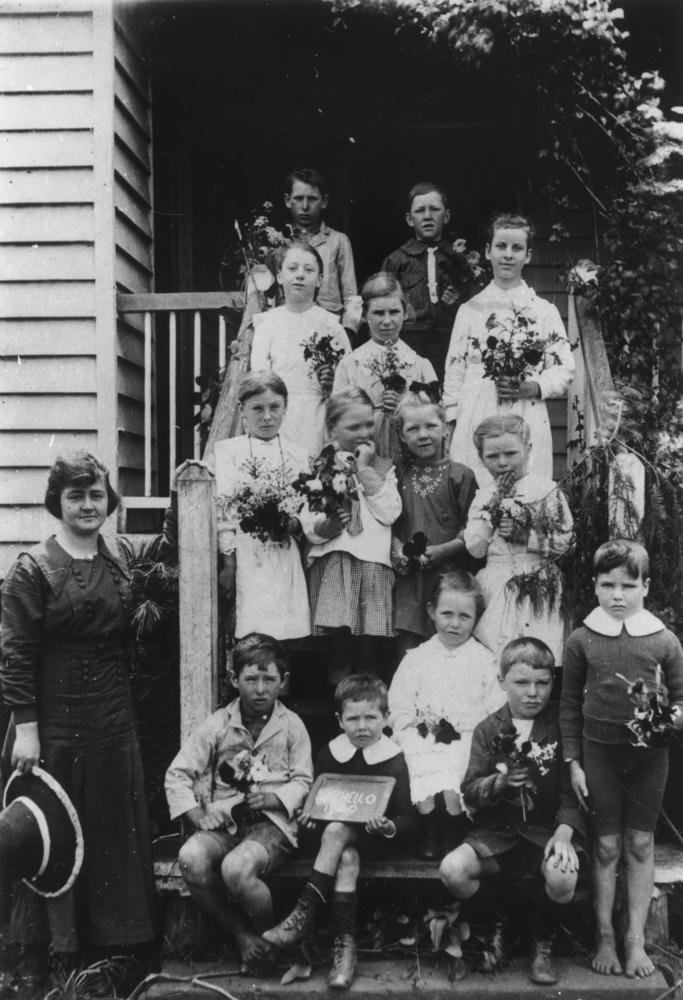
Pupils of Whichello School posing with wildflowers, 1920

Whichello Provisional School opened on 18 April 1894. On 1 January 1909, it became Whichello State School. It closed on 22 January 1942. It was on a 5-acre (2.0 ha) site on the northern side of Whichello School Road (27.29223°S 152.01097°E). The site is now a park.

Whichello Methodist Church opened in March 1907. It was on a 1-acre (0.40 ha) on the northern side of Whichello School Road (27.29296°S 152.01425°E), appox 325 metres (1,066 ft) east of the school. The timber church could seat 50 people. In 1952, the church building was relocated to Wilsonton.

== Demographics ==
In the 2016 census, Whichello had a population of 31 people.

In the 2021 census, Whichello had a population of 31 people.

== Education ==
There are no schools in Whichello. The nearest government primary schools are Crow's Nest State School in neighbouring Crows Nest to the north-east and Goombungee State School in Goombungee to the south-west. The nearest government secondary schools are Crow's Nest State School (to Year 10) and Highfields State Secondary College (to Year 12) in Highfields to the south.
