= Pechey Forestry Arboretum =

Forest reserve in Queensland, Australia

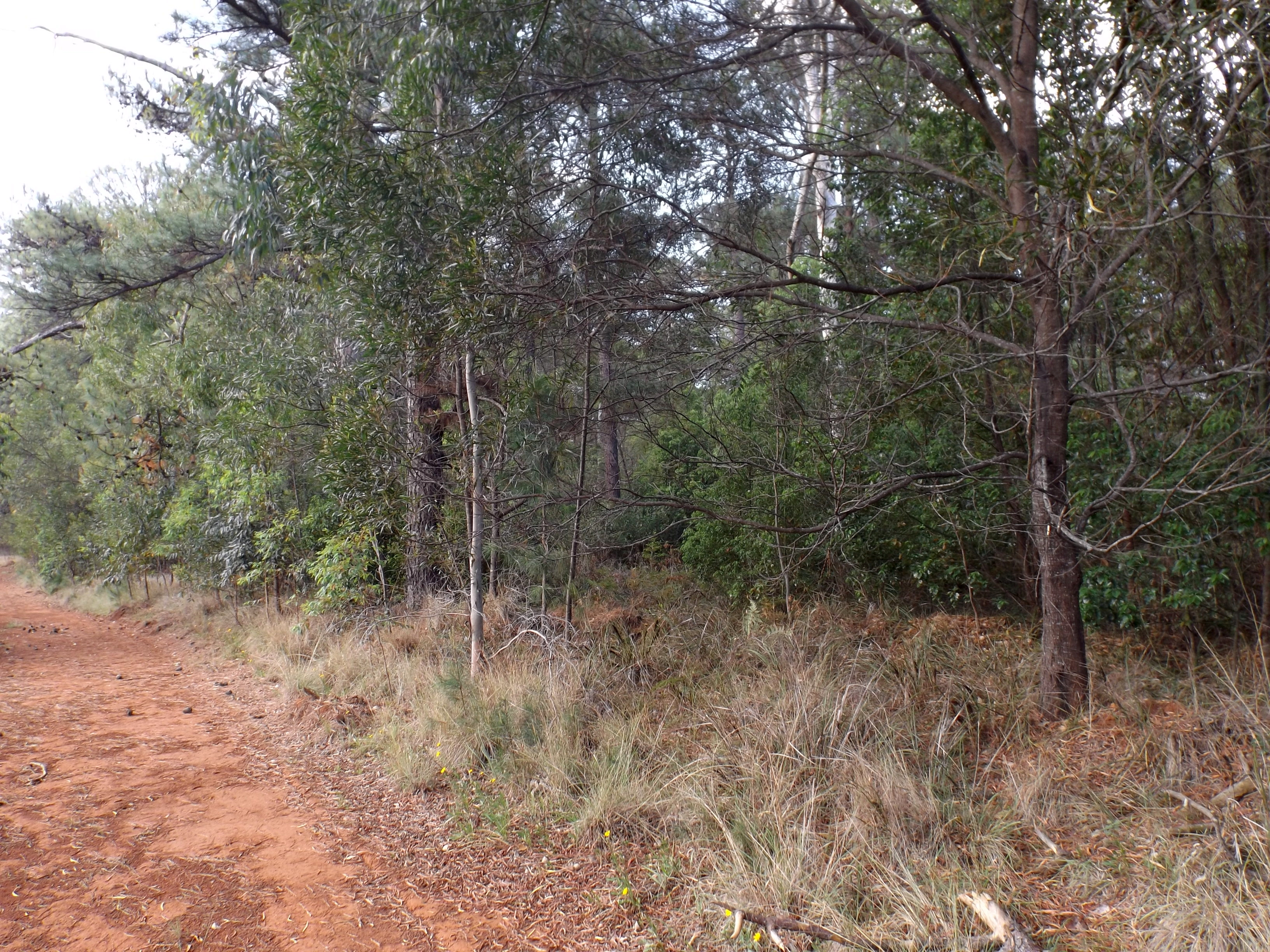
- Reserve vegetation along the New England Highway, 2014

- Location within Queensland Location within Australia
- 27.311°S 152.0508°E
- Location: Pechey State Forest, New England Highway, Pechey, Toowoomba Region, Queensland, Australia

Queensland Heritage Register
- Official name: Pechey Forestry Arboretum
- Type: state heritage (landscape)
- Designated: 23 July 1999
- Reference no.: 601882
- Significant period: 1927-1928 (historical)

Pechey Forestry Arboretum is a heritage-listed forest reserve at Pechey State Forest, New England Highway, Pechey, Toowoomba Region, Queensland, Australia. It was added to the Queensland Heritage Register on 23 July 1999.

== History ==
In 1910 the then Under Secretary of the Department of Public Lands in which Forestry was a sub-department, wrote that the needs of Queensland pine timber would have to be met by exotic varieties secured by importation in a manufactured state or from local plantations on land incapable of producing indigenous varieties.

Arboreta are plots of land where different varieties of trees and plants are planted by government or research bodies to determine suitability of plantings in particular climate, soil type and topography conditions.

As an example of the scientific research into the viable varieties of exotic plantings the Pechey Forestry Arboretum was established. The initial areas of the Pechey State Forest were purchased from the estate of EW Pechey by the Forestry Department in 1926. Under the guidance of Elton Sharman, establishment of plantation areas was commenced in 1927. The land was to supply miscellaneous hardwood, case timbers and future plantation softwood for the Darling Downs market.

A nursery was established on the site in 1927. As one of the many trial plantings throughout Queensland to determine the potential for a broad range of species for timber plantation purposes within State Forests, the Pechey Arboretum an area of 4.5 hectares (11 acres) was established in 1928.

== Description ==
The 4.5 hectares (11 acres) Arboretum is located on the New England Highway south east of Perseverance Dam Road within the Pechey State Forest, Number 909. The Arboretum lines the highway for approximately 300 metres (980 ft) and the site has a depth of 150 metres (490 ft). The Arboretum is approximately 500 metres (1,600 ft) from the entrance to the Perseverance Dam Road and is bounded by forestry roads which serve as firebreaks.

The Pechey Forestry Arboretum is a plot of heavily treed land which retains seven of the original twenty-four species planted in the late 1920s. The overall condition of the place is reasonable although infested with weeds.

== Heritage listing ==
Pechey Forestry Arboretum was listed on the Queensland Heritage Register on 23 July 1999 having satisfied the following criteria.

The place is important in demonstrating the evolution or pattern of Queensland's history.

The Forestry industry has played an important role in the economic, social and historical development of the Queensland. The Pechey Forestry Arboretum demonstrates the phase from the 1920s when plots were planted for scientific and research purposes to develop and encourage diversity within the Forestry industry.

The place has potential to yield information that will contribute to an understanding of Queensland's history.

The Arboretum has the potential to yield further information about the establishment of arboreta, a field of significant research to the agricultural development of Queensland, about which little research has been done.

The place is important in demonstrating the principal characteristics of a particular class of cultural places.

The Arboretum has scientific significance and demonstrates the principle characteristics of scientific plots, in particular, it represents the optimum development of plots which were planted in the 1920s.
