= Pechey, Queensland =

Pechey
- Town
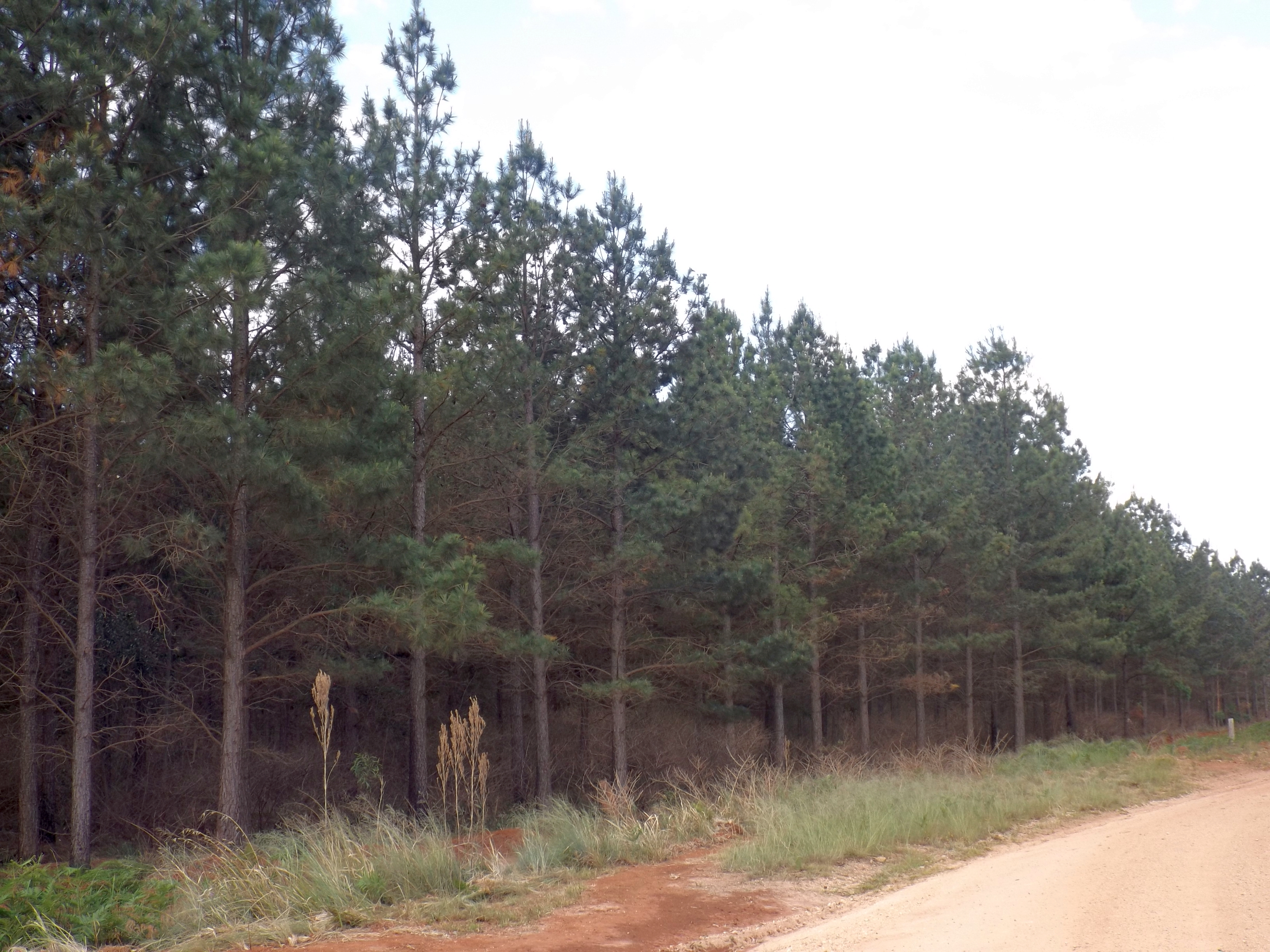
- Pechey State Forest, 2014

- Interactive map of Pechey
- Coordinates: 27.3133°S 152.0511°E
- Country: Australia
- State: Queensland
- LGA: Toowoomba Region
- Location: 5.7 km (3.5 mi) S of Crows Nest; 25.8 km (16.0 mi) NE of Highfields; 37.9 km (23.5 mi) NNE of Toowoomba; 152 km (94 mi) W of Brisbane

Government
  - State electorate: Condamine
  - Federal division: Groom

Area
  - Total: 32.8 km^{2} (12.7 sq mi)

Population
  - Total: 98 (2021 census)
  - Density: 2.988/km^{2} (7.74/sq mi)
- Time zone: UTC+10:00 (AEST)
- Postcode: 4352
Localities around Pechey
Whichello	Crows Nest	Crows Nest
Whichello	Pechey	Grapetree
Groomsville	Merritts Creek; Hampton	Grapetree

Pechey is a rural locality in the Toowoomba Region, Queensland, Australia. In the 2021 census, the locality had a population of 98 people.

== Geography ==
The New England Highway passes through the centre of the town, and the Pechey-Maclagan Road exits to the west. Pechey State Forest occupies the entire south east corner of the area.

== History ==
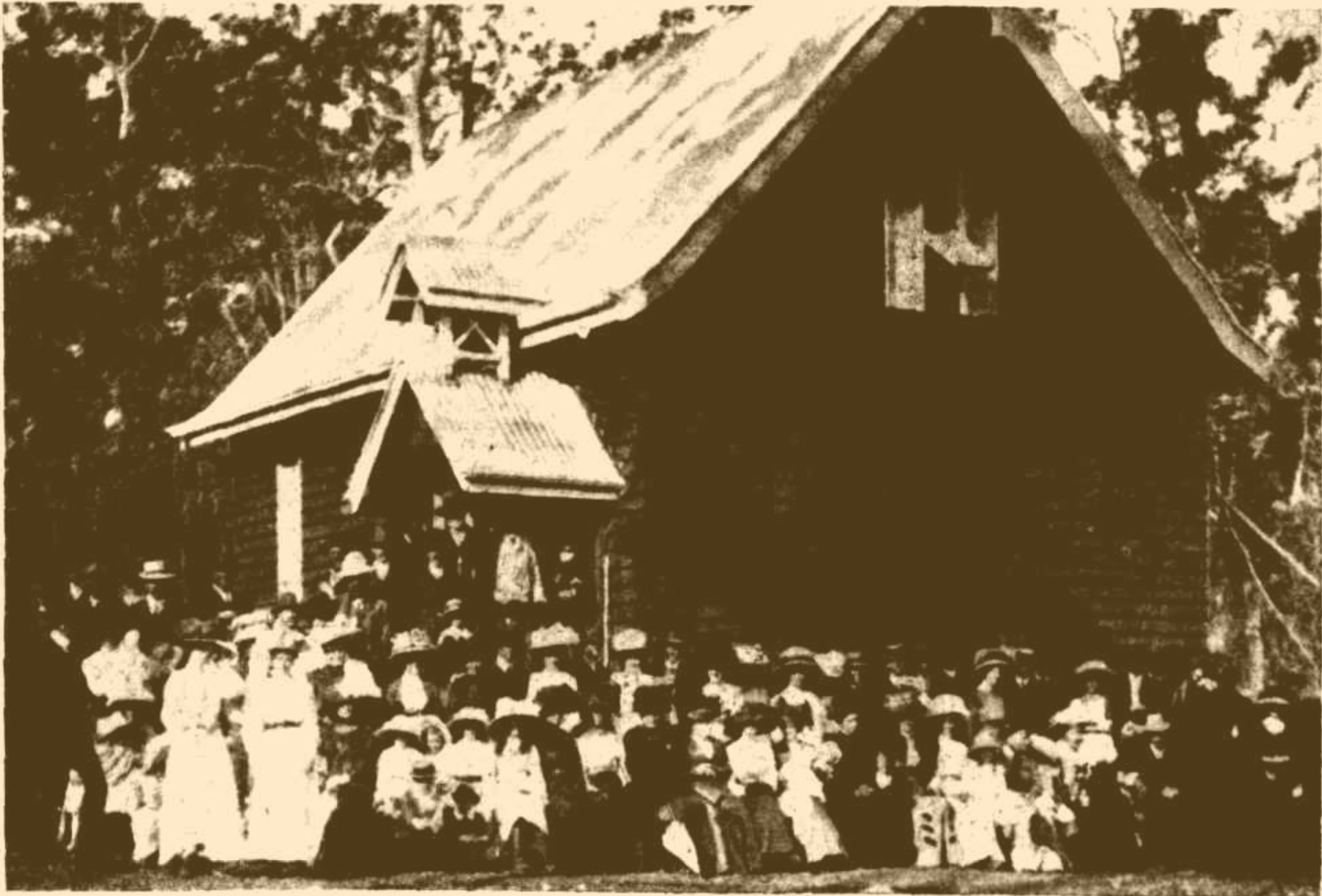
Opening of St Faith's Anglican Church, 1911

The town was named after Edward Wilmot Pechey (Member of the Queensland Legislative Assembly for the Electoral district of Aubigny 1873-1877). He was also a surveyor and sawmill owner.

Pechey Provisional School opened on 19 March 1889. On 1 January 1909, it became Pechey State School. It closed in 1959.

St Faith's Anglican Church was dedicated on 10 September 1911 by the Venerable Archdeacon Arthur Rivers. In February 1931, it was relocated to Virginia (now Pierces Creek), where it was re-dedicated on 1 March 1931 by Archdeacon Glover.

Pechey Post Office opened on 1 July 1927 (a receiving office had been open from 1888) and closed in 1971.

== Demographics ==
In the 2016 census, the locality of Pechey had a population of 105 people.

In the 2021 census, the locality had a population of 98 people.

== Heritage listings ==
Heritage-listed sites in Pechey include Pechey Forestry Arboretum.

== Education ==
There are no schools in Pechey. The nearest government primary school is Crow's Nest State School in neighbouring Crows Nest to the north. The nearest government secondary schools are Crow's Nest State School (to Year 10) and Highfields State Secondary College (to Year 12) in Highfields to the south-west.
