= Haden, Queensland =

Haden
- Town
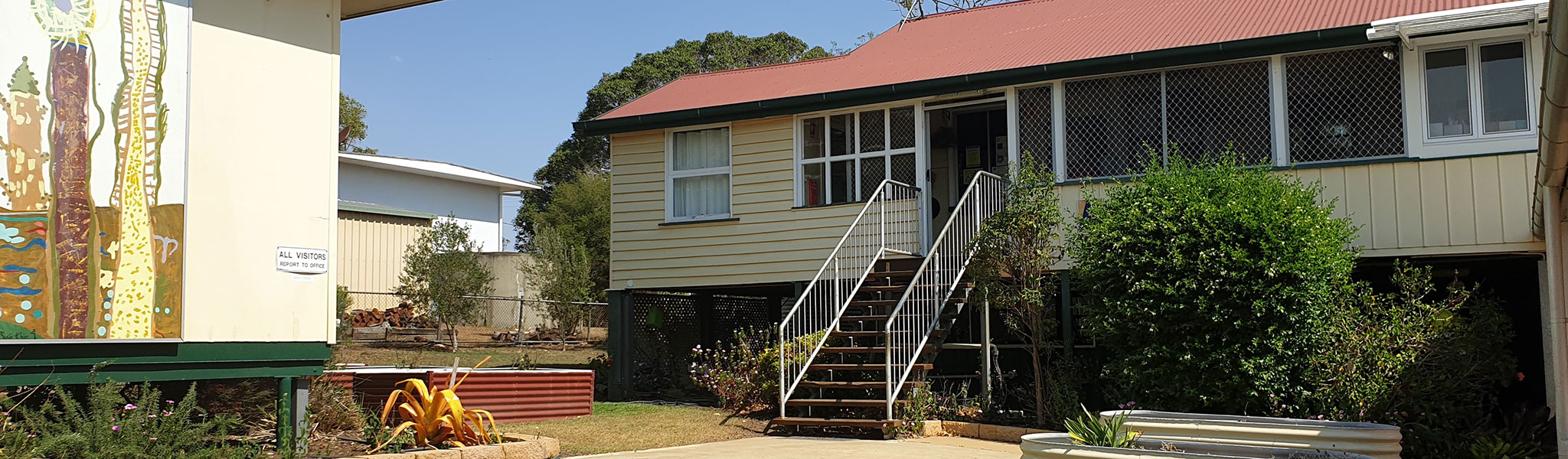
- Haden State School, 2022

- Interactive map of Haden
- Coordinates: 27.2236°S 151.8833°E
- Country: Australia
- State: Queensland
- LGA: Toowoomba Region
- Location: 21.5 km (13.4 mi) WNW of Crows Nest; 46.8 km (29.1 mi) N of Toowoomba; 172 km (107 mi) WNW of Brisbane

Government
  - State electorate: Condamine
  - Federal divisions: Groom; Maranoa

Area
  - Total: 42.1 km^{2} (16.3 sq mi)

Population
  - Total: 235 (2021 census)
  - Density: 5.582/km^{2} (14.46/sq mi)
- Time zone: UTC+10:00 (AEST)
- Postcode: 4353
Localities around Haden
Doctor Creek	Djuan	Djuan
Kilbirnie	Haden	Djuan
Kilbirnie	Goombungee	Bergen

Haden is a rural town and locality in the Toowoomba Region, Queensland, Australia. In the 2021 census, the locality of Haden had a population of 235 people.

== Geography ==
Haden is a small rural town approximately 50 kilometres (31 mi) north of Toowoomba and 185 kilometres (115 mi) north west from Brisbane. The town is set high on the Great Dividing Range, resulting in a high number of windy days. There is a picturesque lookout on the Haden-Maclagan Road to the west of the town.

== History ==
In August 1889 the Queensland Government provided 10 acres (4.0 ha) of land for a cemetery for Goombungee. However, the soil proved too difficult to dig a grave, so another 6.2-acre (2.5 ha) cemetery reserve was provided on 17 January 1894 (which is now within the boundaries of Haden). The first burial in the new cemetery was Edith Annie Lloyd, aged 10 months, occurring on 23 July 1894. Although intended as a cemetery for Goombungee, its location resulted in it being used by residents of both Goombungee and Haden and the name Goombungee-Haden Cemetery began to be used in 1925. In 2008 the cemetery's private trustees handed over the responsibility for the cemetery to the Toowoomba Regional Council.

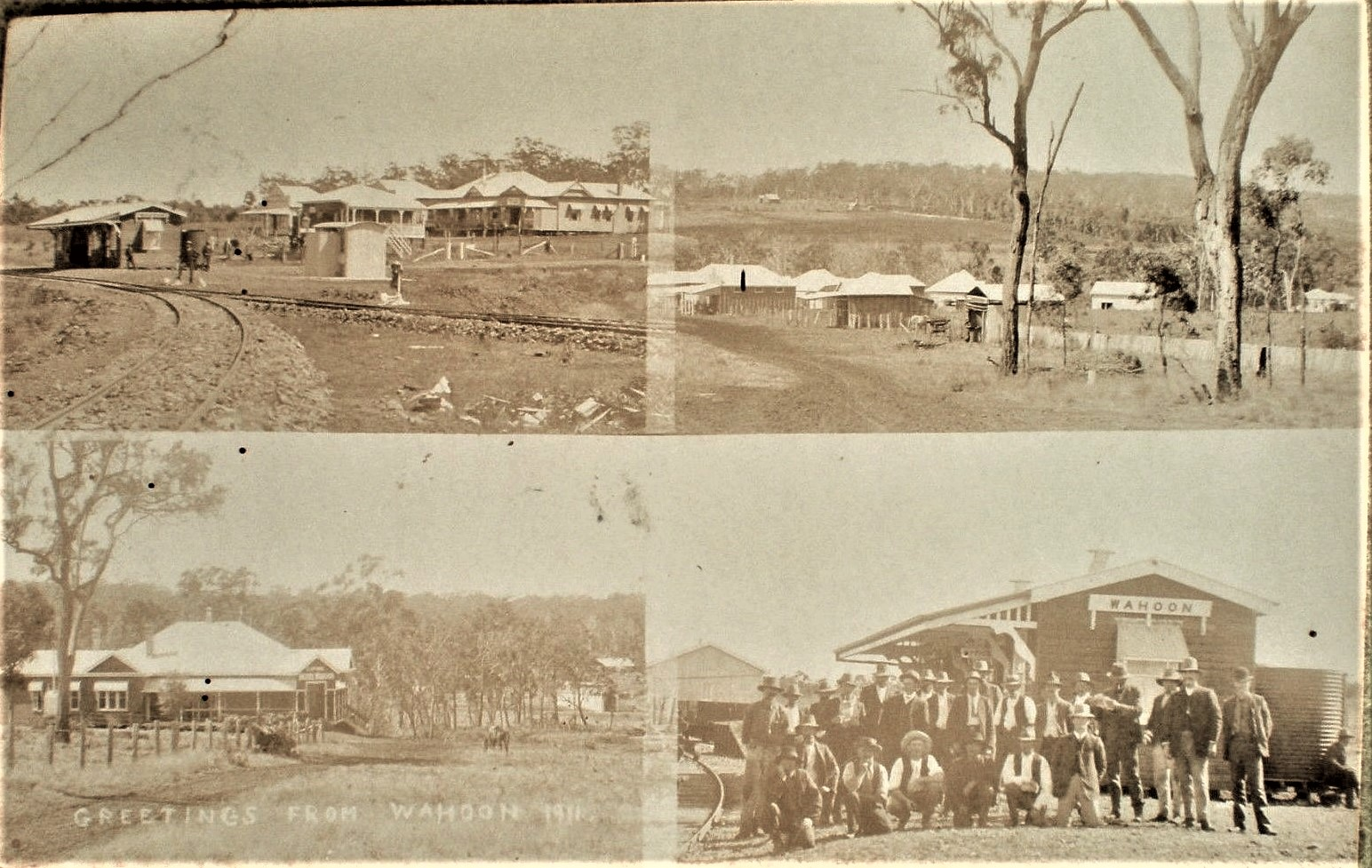
Views of new township and railway station at Wahoon (now Haden), 1911

The district was originally known as Wahoon, from an Aboriginal word meaning scrub turkey. When the railway station was established as the terminus of the Haden railway line, it was named Haden railway station on 8 June 1912, after Alice Elizabeth Ruth Paget (née Haden), the second wife of Walter Trueman Paget who was Secretary for Railways from 1908 to 1915. The town takes its name from the railway station.

On Saturday 16 January 1892, a public meeting was called to plan the establishment of a school in Doctor's Creek. In June 1892, tenders were called to erect a provisional school building. Doctor's Creek Provisional School opened on 30 January 1893 with picnic to celebrate its opening on Friday 10 February 1893. The first teacher was Mr Ridler. The school building was 21 by 14 feet (6.4 by 4.3 m) and was built by Mr Maunder of Meringandan. On 2 April 1900, it became Doctor's Creek State School. In preparation for the state school, tenders were called in June 1899 to erect a state school building and to convert the existing provisional school building into a teacher's residence. The school closed in 1963. It was at 327 Haden Peranga Road (south-west corner with Whites Road, now within the boundaries of Haden, 27.2087°S 151.8589°E). The school teacher's residence still exists on the site.

Haden had been a thriving town with numerous pubs and stores at the turn of the 20th century. With the arrival of rail and Haden State School which was opened in 1912 the town prospered. It became an established place to live, as the surrounding land was ideal for cattle and dairy farming. With the rapid increase in technology and the decline of the dairy industry in Queensland due to deregulation, the population began to decline. Only a handful of farms continue to operate in the area, with the majority of farmers turning to cattle and crop production.

In 1903, St Paul's Lutheran church was established at 273 Haden Peranga Road in Doctor's Creek (south-east corner with Whites Road, but now in Haden, 27.2087°S 151.8598°E). The first Lutheran settlers came to the district in 1888 but it was not until 1902 that a Lutheran congregation was formed as part of the United German and Scandinavian Synod of Queensland. At the congregation's first meeting on 23 March 1903, it was decided to build a church. The church was dedicated on 29 November 1903 by Reverend George Heuer of Toowoomba, the president of the Queensland synod. The church is no longer extant.

Wahoon State School opened on 20 May 1912. In February 1913, it was renamed Haden State School.

St John the Evangelist Anglican Church was dedicated in 1924 by The Venerable Edward Castell Osborn. Its closure circa 2013 was approved by Archbishop Phillip Aspinall.

On Sunday 19 April 1931, Bishop James Byrne blessed and officially opened St Leo's Catholic Church.

St Leo's Catholic Church was destroyed by fire on 7 June 2020. The fire was deliberately lit.

== Demographics ==
In the 2016 census, the locality of Haden had a population of 195 people.

In the 2021 census, the locality of Haden had a population of 235 people.

== Education ==
Haden State School is a government primary (Prep–6) school for boys and girls at 1520 Haden-Crow's Nest Road (27.2241°S 151.8892°E). In 2017, the school had an enrolment of 22 students with 3 teachers (2 full-time equivalent) and 6 non-teaching staff (2 full-time equivalent). In 2018, the school had an enrolment of 32 students with 3 teachers and 6 non-teaching staff (2 full-time equivalent).

There are no secondary schools in Haden. The nearest government secondary schools are Crow's Nest State School (to Year 10) in Crows Nest to the south-east, Quinalow State School (to Year 10) in Quinalow to the north-west, and Highfield State Secondary College in Highfields to the south.

== Amenities ==
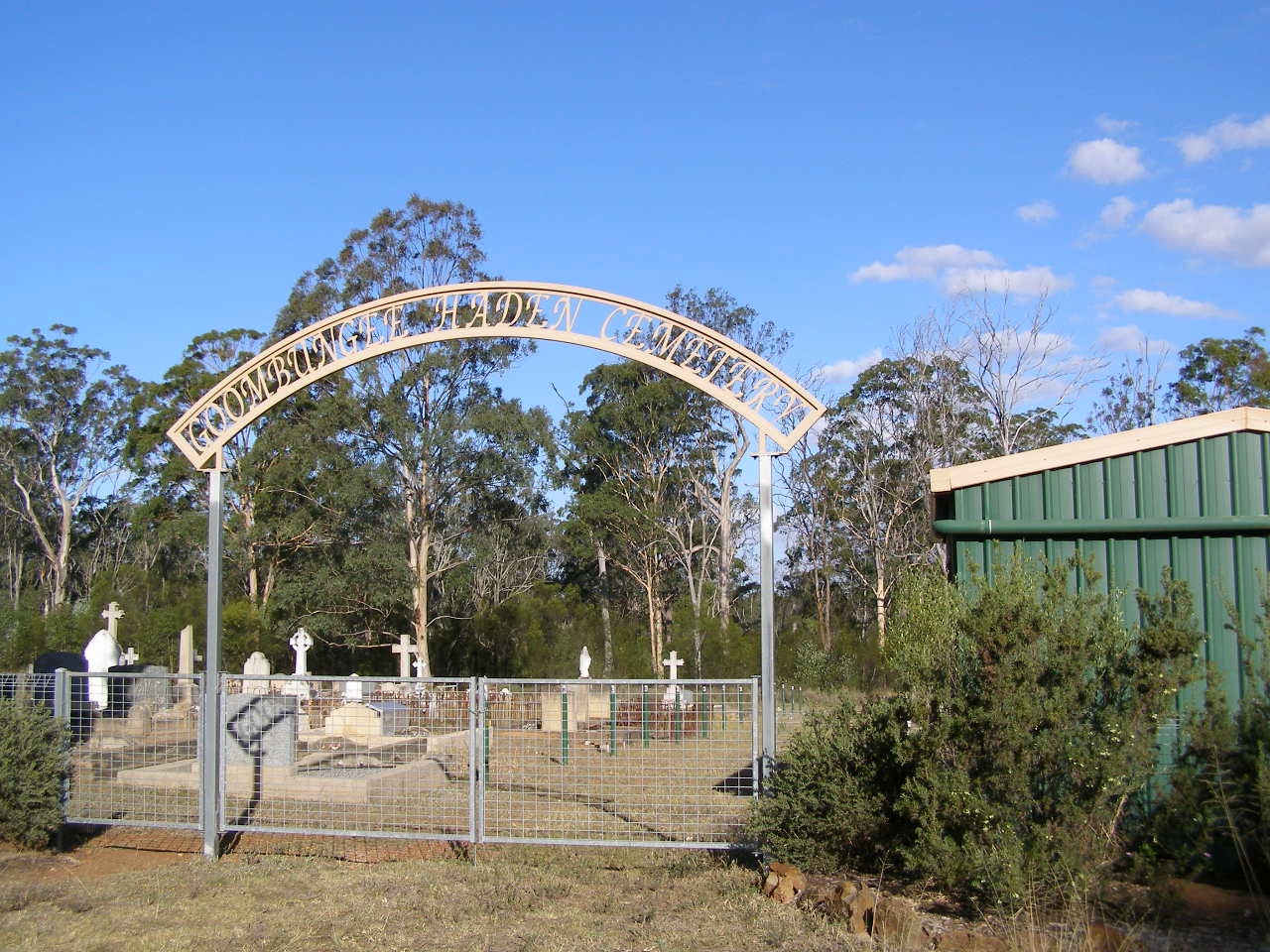
Goombungee Haden Cemetery, 2006

Haden Hall is on Boundary Road (27.2232°S 151.8815°E).

Three churches continue to operate. However, St Leo's Catholic Church at 34 Boundary Street (27.2226°S 151.8815°E) is currently destroyed following a fire.

Library services in Haden are provided by the Toowoomba Regional Council's mobile library service. The van visits Haden State School on the 1st and 3rd Tuesday of each month.

The Goombungee-Haden cemetery is in Cemetery Road (27.2497°S 151.8630°E).

== Notable residents ==
- Jessica van Vonderen, Queensland host of The 7:30 Report is a past pupil of Haden State School
