= Crows Nest, Queensland =

Crows Nest
- Town
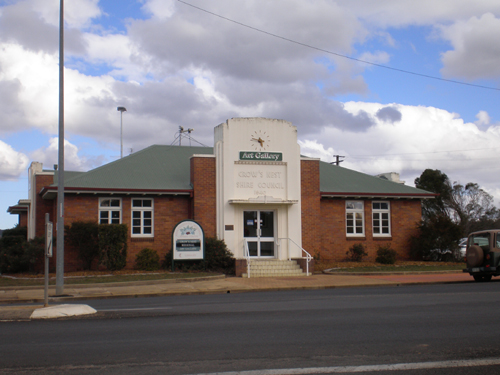
- Former Council chambers, now an art gallery

- Interactive map of Crows Nest
- Coordinates: 27.2658°S 152.0580°E
- Country: Australia
- State: Queensland
- LGA: Toowoomba Region
- Location: 43 km (27 mi) N of Toowoomba; 158 km (98 mi) W of Brisbane
- Established: 1876

Government
  - State electorate: Condamine
  - Federal division: Maranoa

Area
  - Total: 96.1 km^{2} (37.1 sq mi)

Population
  - Total: 2,212 (2021 census)
  - Density: 23.018/km^{2} (59.62/sq mi)
- Time zone: UTC+10:00 (AEST)
- Postcode: 4355
- County: Cavendish
- Parish: Crows Nest
Localities around Crows Nest
Mountain Camp	Pierces Creek; Anduramba	The Bluff
Pinelands	Crows Nest	Cressbrook Creek
Plainby; Whichello	Pechey; Grapetree	Ravensbourne

Crows Nest is a rural town and locality in the Toowoomba Region, Queensland, Australia. The town is located in the Darling Downs on the New England Highway, 158 kilometres (98 mi) from the state capital, Brisbane and 43 kilometres (27 mi) from the nearby city of Toowoomba. In the 2021 census, the locality of Crows Nest had a population of 2,212 people.

== Geography ==
6 kilometres (3.7 mi) east of the town is the Crows Nest National Park.

== History ==
Jarowair (also known as Yarowair, Yarow-wair, Barrunggam, Yarrowair, Yarowwair and Yarrow-weir) is one of the languages of the Toowoomba region. The Jarowair language region includes the landscape within the local government boundaries of the Toowoomba Regional Council, particularly Toowoomba north to Crows Nest and west to Oakey.

The origin of the name is uncertain. One claim is that it was named after an Aboriginal man, Jimmy Crow, who gave directions to early European settlers. He lived in a big hollow tree near the police station, which became known as Crows Nest. It became a popular overnight camp for the bullock teams hauling timber, which in turn attracted farmers and settlers. Another claim is that the name derives from the indigenous name for the area Tookoogandanna, meaning "the home of crows". Some researchers acknowledge there are many possible origins of the name.

A pastoral station raising sheep was established in 1849. In 1875, large sections of the pastoral station were offered for selection.

Crows Nest was declared a town in 1876. The town was originally centred around Albert Street and South Street (approx 27.26620°S 152.05962°E).

The construction of Crow's Nest Provisional School was completed on 2 February 1877. Provided by the local community, the building was 20 by 12 feet (6.1 by 3.7 m) with a shingle roof and veranda. The school opened on 12 March 1877. On 25 October 1880, it became Crows Nest State School. It was on a 5-acre (2.0 ha) site on the western side of Dale Street (now Dale Street South, approx 27.26448°S 152.05992°E).

Crows Nest Post Office opened on 1 July 1878.

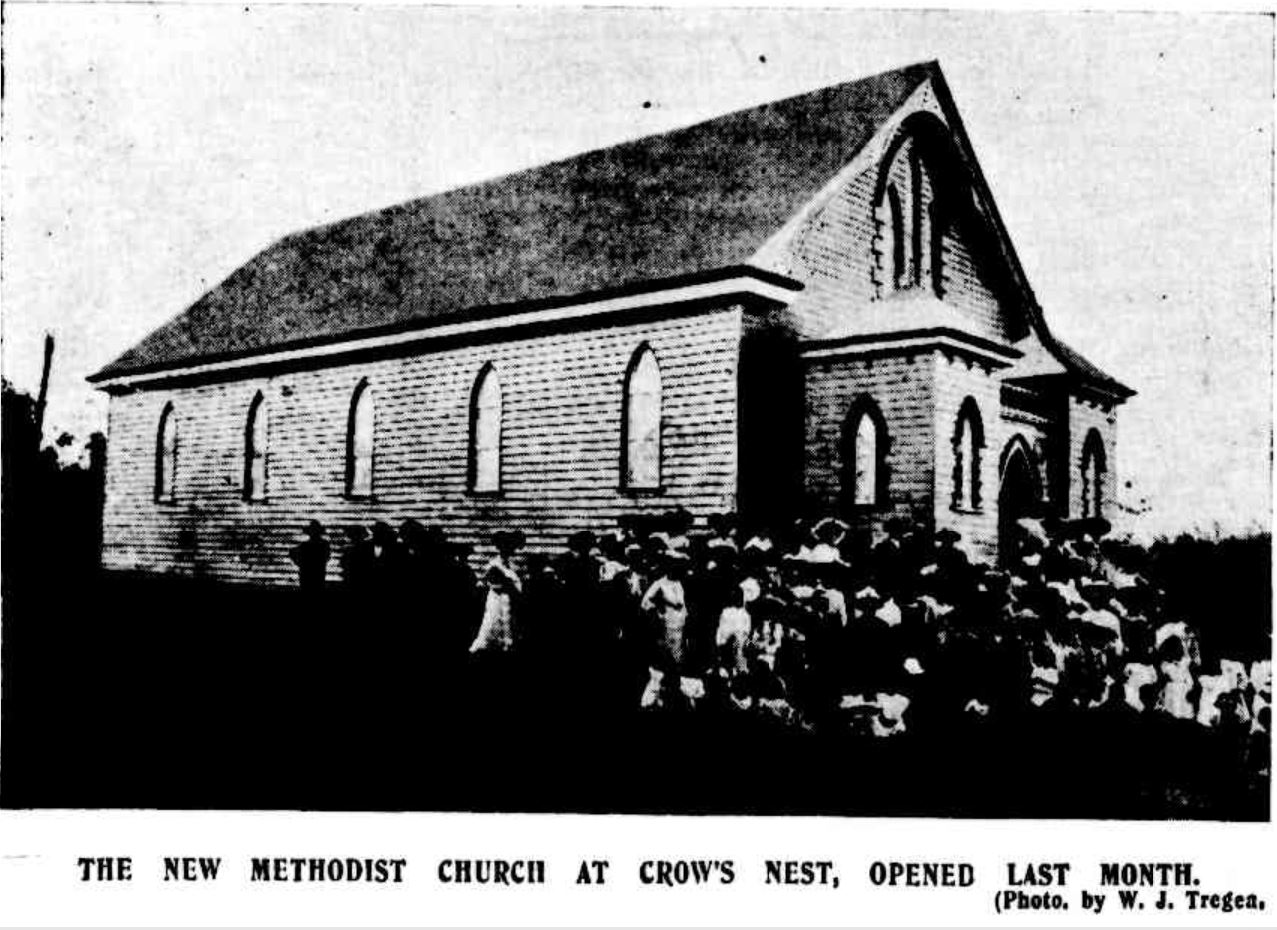
The new Methodist Church, 1906

In December 1880, the Primitive Methodist Church purchased 1.5 acres (0.61 ha) of land for a church. The church opened on Easter Sunday on 17 April 1881. On Sunday 31 December 1905, a new Crows Nest Methodist Church was officially opened by Reverend Henry Youngman, replacing the 1880 church. The 1905 church was 45 by 30 feet (13.7 by 9.1 m) with two classrooms at the rear, each 15 by 15 feet (4.6 by 4.6 m). The land cost £160 and the building £360, a total of £520. In 1956, the church was remodelled. After the Methodist Church amalgamated into the Uniting Church in Australia in 1977, it became the Crows Nest District Uniting Church.

The Crows Nest branch railway line from Toowoomba was completed in 1886. It was built to service a number of sawmills and the dairying district. The terminus was at Crows Nest railway station, just north of Curnow Street where Community Place and the swimming pool are today (approx 27.26193°S 152.05452°E). Due to the importance of a railway station for a rural community, the area around it soon became regarded as the town centre. The railway closed in the early 1960s.

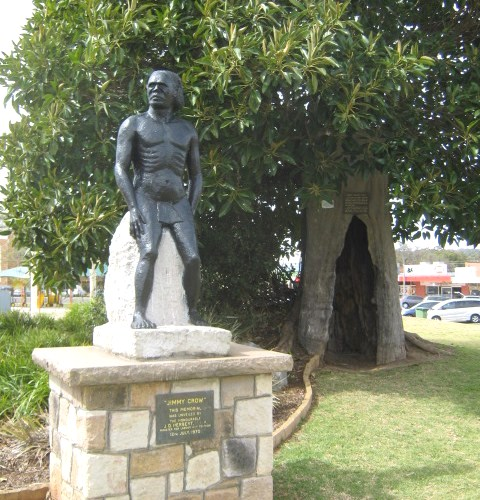
Jimmy Crow statue, Crows Nest Centenary Park

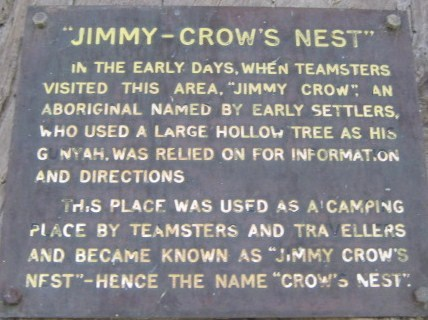
Jimmy Crow Statue information

In 1913, the Shire of Crows Nest was formed with the town becoming the administrative centre for the new local government area. The shire expanded in 1949 and was merged into the Toowoomba Region local government area in 2008.

On 15 July 1917, St Matthew's Catholic Primary School opened on the eastern side Esk Street (approx 27.26116°S 152.05733°E). It has subsequently closed and the site is now vacant land.

Recognising the town's shift northwards towards the railway station, in 1947, a new 45-acre (18 ha) site was reserved on the western side of Littleton Street for a new school which would incorporate a secondary department. However, approval to build the new school was delayed until 1958. As the new school was not completed, the secondary department opened in 1959 in the Church of England Parish Hall. In late 1959, the new school was opened.

On Saturday 7 April 1951, Archbishop Reginald Halse dedicated a new Anglican church in Crows Nest, built from concrete blocks. In 2019 the Anglican parish of Crows Nest entered in a partnership with St David's Anglican Church in Chelmer, Brisbane, to share their ministry through a combination of services at the various churches combined with online services from St David's, as an experiment in how the Anglican Church might operate in the future.

In the 1950s and 60s the town's population declined, together with the local industries.

A 6-foot 6-inch high statue of Jimmy Crow was unveiled in the Centenary Park at Crows Nest on 12 July 1969 by Minister for Labour and Tourism, John Herbert. The statue was sculpted by Fred Gardiner of the Tia Art Gallery. The statue was cut from a single block of Helidon freestone and weighs over one ton. An 18-foot high hollow tree stump was also moved to Centenary Park and a fig tree was planted on top so the roots could be trained around it to form a living hollow tree. It is believed to be the only memorial in Australia to an Aboriginal person after whom a town was named.

== Demographics ==
In the 2016 census, the locality of Crows Nest had a population of 2160 people.

In the 2021 census, the locality of Crows Nest had a population of 2,212 people.

== Heritage listings ==
Crows Nest has a number of heritage-listed sites, including:

- Crows Nest Post Office, 19 Curnow Street

== Education ==
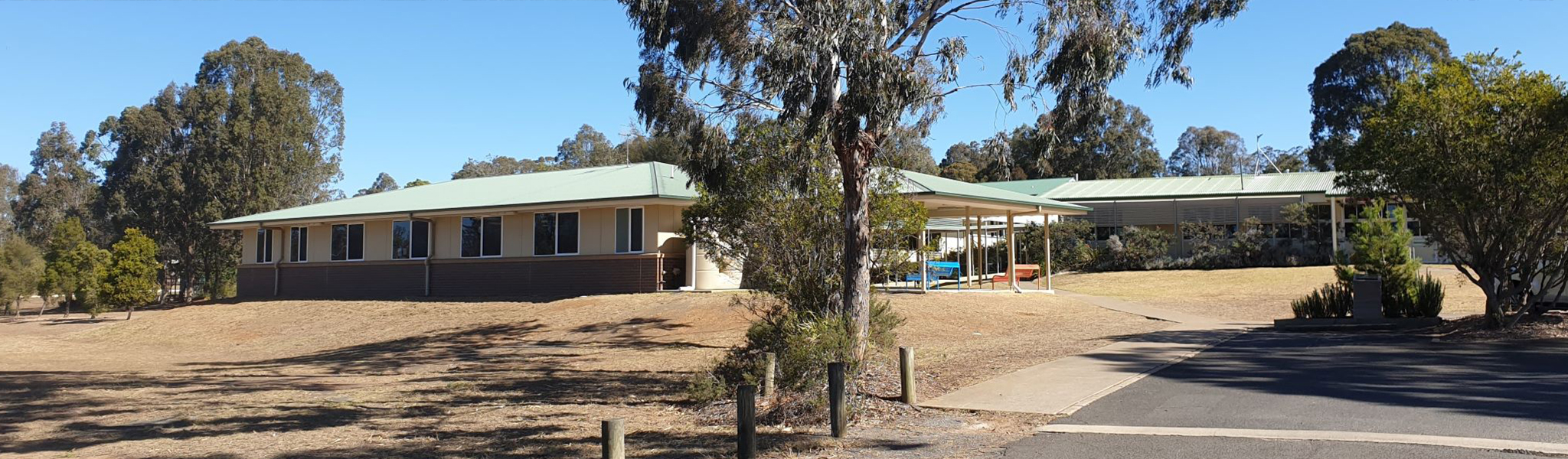
Crow's Nest State School, 2024

Crow's Nest State School is a government primary and secondary (Prep–10) school for boys and girls at 1 Littleton Street (27.2648°S 152.0521°E). In 2018, the school had an enrolment of 323 students with 32 teachers (28 full-time equivalent) and 20 non-teaching staff (13 full-time equivalent). It includes a special education program.

The nearest government school providing secondary education to Year 12 is Highfields State Secondary College in Highfields to the south-west.

== Amenities ==
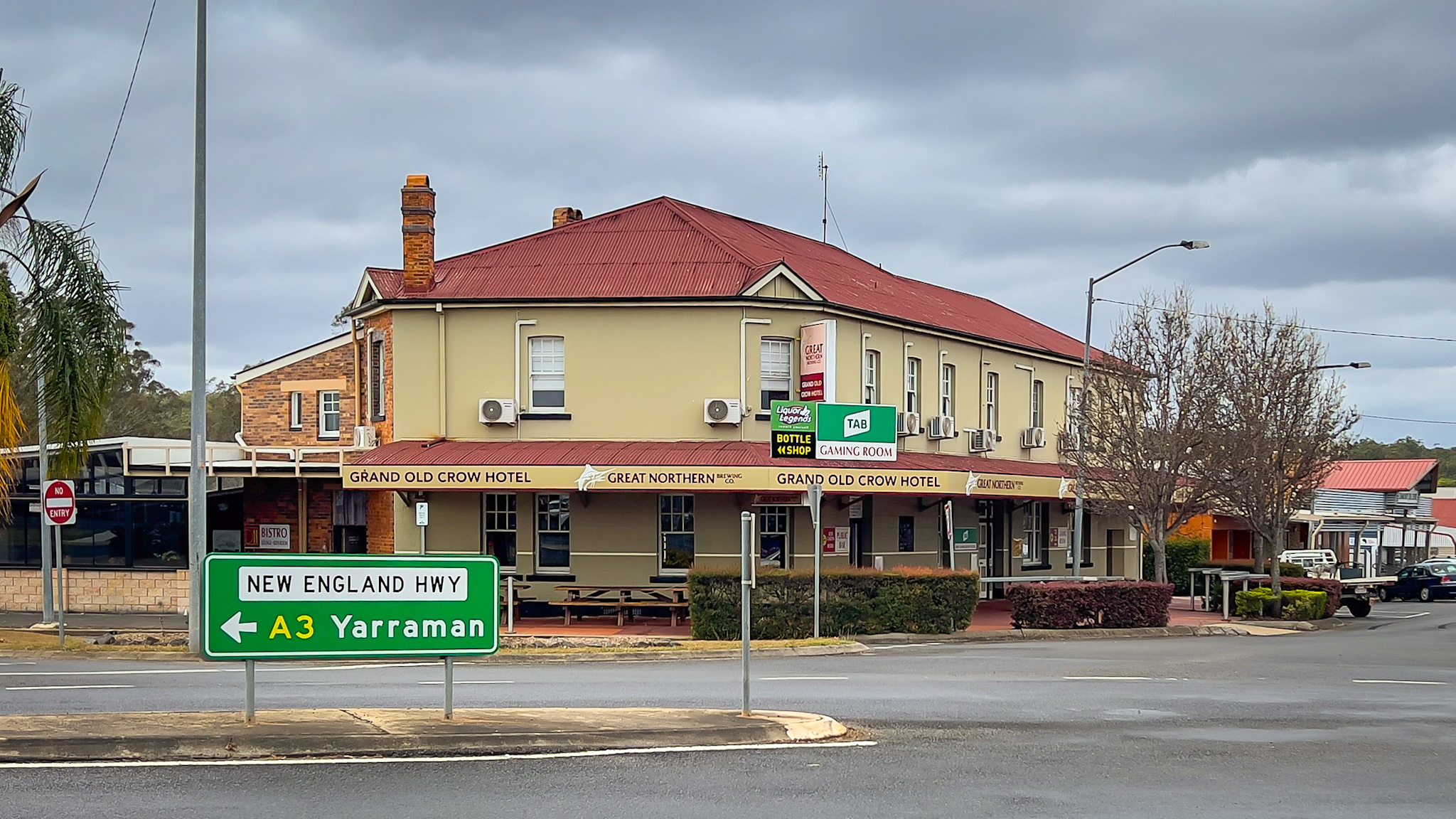
Grand Old Crow Hotel, 2023

Town facilities include a large pavilion for sports activities and other functions, showgrounds and a 25-metre (82 ft) heated swimming pool.

The John French V.C. Memorial Library is open Monday to Saturday; the name commemorating Jack French, a local man who was killed in World War II and was awarded the Victoria Cross for his valour in the face of the enemy. The library is located on the corner of William Street and the New England Highway and is operated by the Toowoomba Regional Council. The current library facility opened in 1996 with a major refurbishment in 2014.

Crows Nest Regional Art Gallery is located in the same building as the Crows Nest Library, and is also used to showcase local talent.

The Crows Nest branch of the Queensland Country Women's Association meets at 7 Thallon Street (27.2607°S 152.0533°E).

St George's Anglican Church is at 13 Thallon Street (27.2601°S 152.0526°E).

St Matthew's Catholic Church is at 20 Creek Street (27.2621°S 152.0577°E).

Crows Nest District Uniting Church is at 17-19 Emu Creek Road (27.2592°S 152.0528°E).

New Hope Church is at 9 Emu Creek Road (27.25992°S 152.05346°E). The church is affiliated with the Australian Christian Churches.

== Notable residents ==
- Jack French, recipient of the Victoria Cross
