= Cyclone Oswald =

Category 1 Australian region cyclone in 2013

Tropical Cyclone Oswald
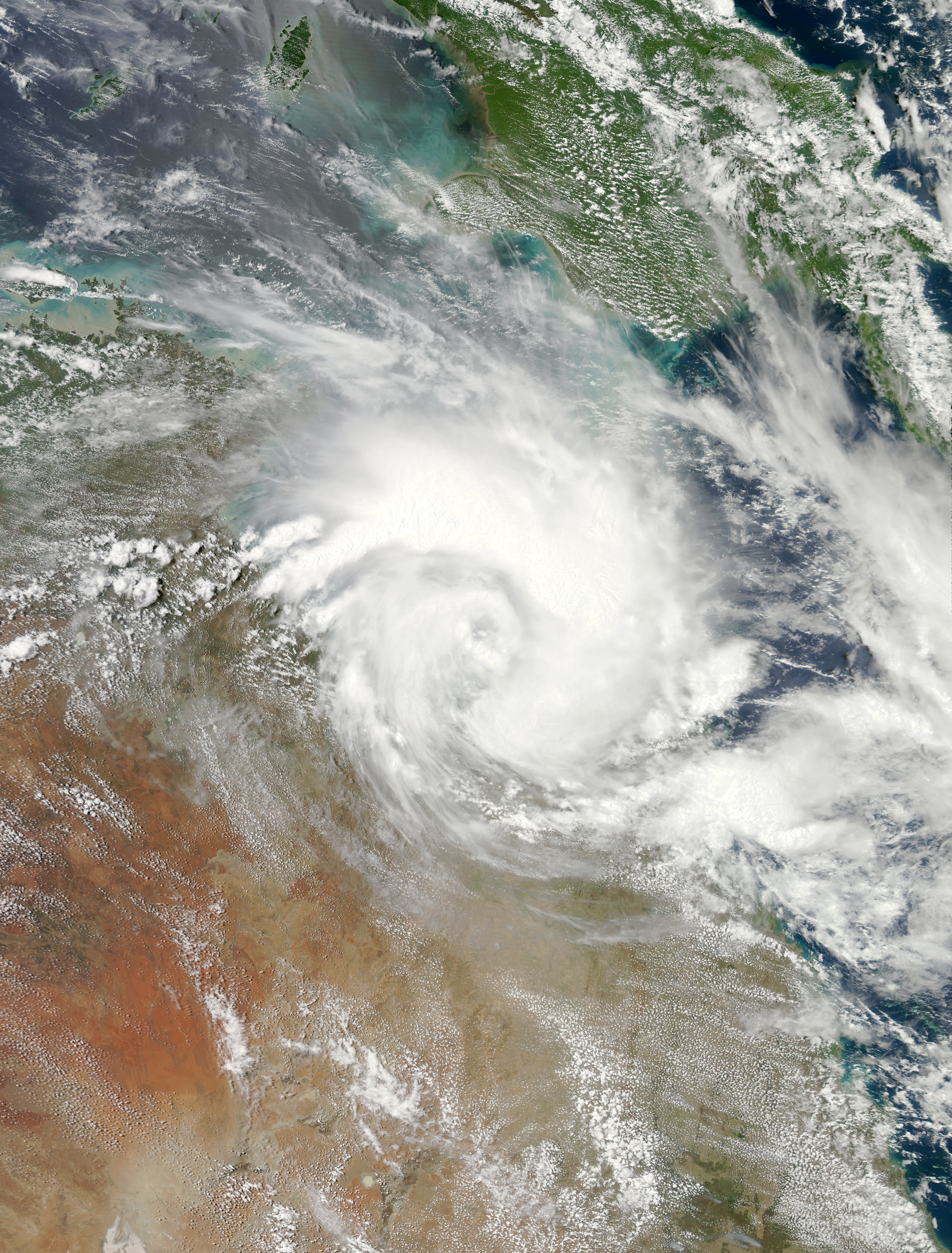
- Satellite image of Tropical Cyclone Oswald on 21 January as it made landfall in Queensland

Meteorological history
- Formed: 17 January 2013
- Dissipated: 28 January 2013

Category 1 tropical cyclone
- 10-minute sustained (BOM)
- Highest winds: 65 km/h (40 mph)
- Lowest pressure: 991 hPa (mbar); 29.26 inHg

Tropical storm
- 1-minute sustained (SSHWS/JTWC)
- Highest winds: 85 km/h (50 mph)
- Lowest pressure: 989 hPa (mbar); 29.21 inHg

Overall effects
- Fatalities: 6 total
- Missing: 1
- Damage: >$2.52 billion (2013 USD) (Third-costliest tropical cyclone in the Australian region)
- Areas affected: Queensland, New South Wales
- IBTrACS
- Part of the 2012–13 Australian region cyclone season

Tropical Cyclone Oswald was a tropical cyclone that passed over parts of Queensland and New South Wales, Australia over a number of days, causing widespread impact including severe storms, flooding, and water spouts. Coastal regions of Queensland were the most impacted with Mundubbera, Eidsvold, Gayndah and Bundaberg in the Wide Bay–Burnett hit severely. In many places the rainfall total for January set new records. Across the affected region, damage from severe weather and flooding amounted to at least A$2.4 billion ($2.52 billion USD).

7,500 residents of Bundaberg and patients at the Bundaberg Hospital were evacuated. Houses were completely washed away and parts of Bundaberg's sewage network were destroyed. Cuts to transport links including damage to numerous bridges, communication interruptions, electrical blackouts and water supply problems were experienced across wide areas. Several swiftwater rescues had to be undertaken.

== Meteorological history ==
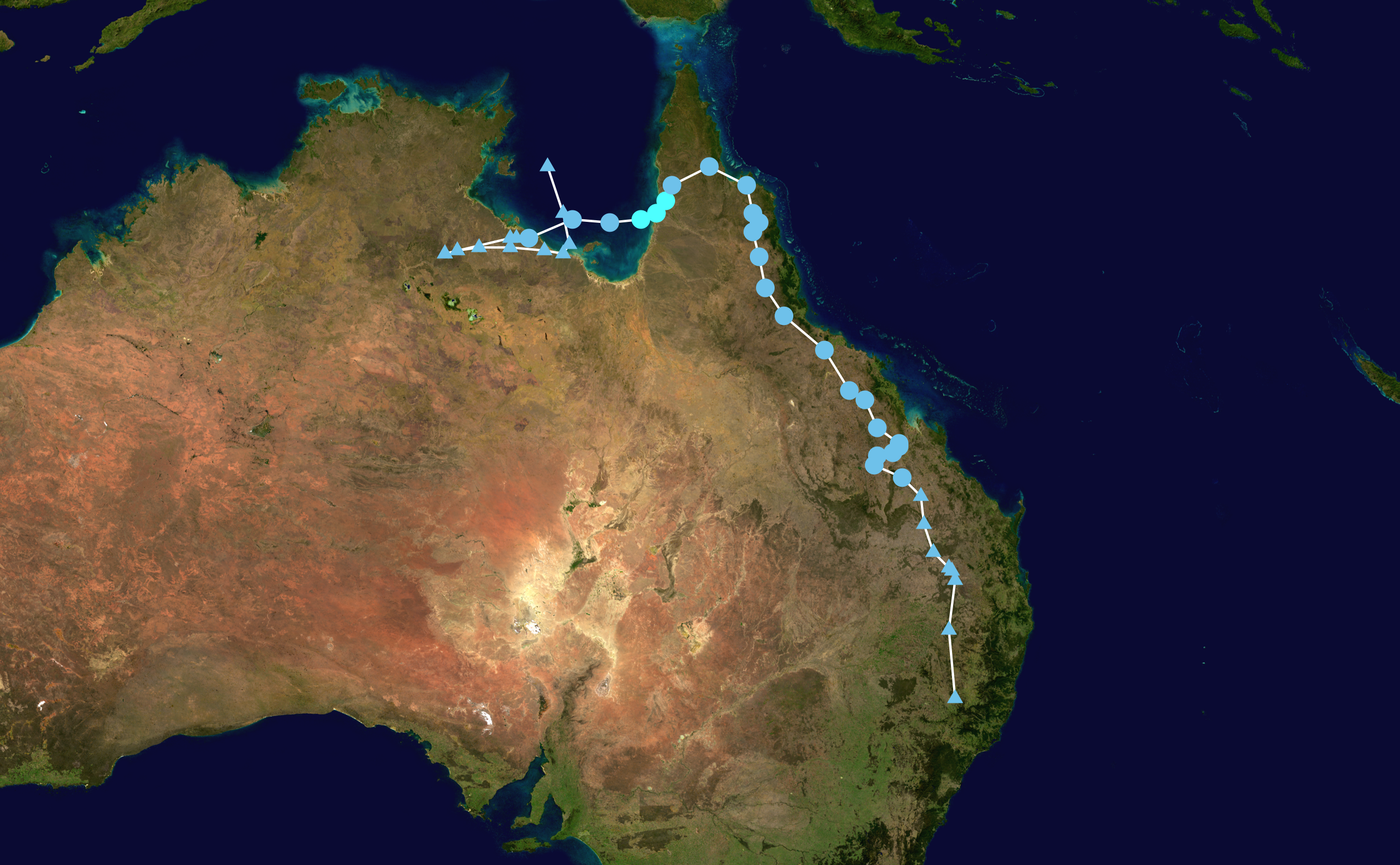
Map plotting the storm's track and intensity, according to the Saffir–Simpson scale Map key Saffir–Simpson scale Tropical depression (≤38 mph, ≤62 km/h) Tropical storm (39–73 mph, 63–118 km/h) Category 1 (74–95 mph, 119–153 km/h) Category 2 (96–110 mph, 154–177 km/h) Category 3 (111–129 mph, 178–208 km/h) Category 4 (130–156 mph, 209–251 km/h) Category 5 (≥157 mph, ≥252 km/h) Unknown Storm type Tropical cyclone Subtropical cyclone Extratropical cyclone, remnant low, tropical disturbance, or monsoon depression

On 17 January, the Australian Bureau of Meteorology's Tropical Cyclone Warning Centres and the United States Joint Typhoon Warning Center (JTWC) started to monitor a tropical low that had developed within a marginal environment for further development over the Gulf of Carpentaria. Over the next two days, the cyclone slightly developed further before the system made landfall to the southwest of Borroloola early on 19 January, where the possibility for further development became stifled. By 20 January, the system completed a clockwise loop before re-emerging into the Gulf of Carpentaria. Once back over water, the system quickly organised and strengthened into Tropical Cyclone Oswald early on 21 January. At the same time, the JTWC began monitoring the system as Tropical Cyclone 11P.

Radar imagery from Mornington Island depicted a well-defined low-level circulation with defined banding features wrapping into the centre. Situated in a very moist air mass and over the warm waters of the Gulf, some intensification was expected before Oswald struck the Cape York Peninsula. Approximately 12 hours after being named, the storm made its second landfall north of Kowanyama with winds of 65 km/h (40 mph) and the final advisory was issued by the TCWC in Brisbane. Although over land, the system was able to maintain a defined circulation and gradually reorganised as it moved southwestward. By 23 January, deep convection redeveloped over the circulation and a strong monsoonal flow became established to its north. A high pressure system over New Zealand blocked the low pressure system from moving east, away from the Queensland coast, allowing the low to move slowly along the Queensland coast also causing it to stall near Rockhampton and in southern Queensland; feeding moist air from the Coral Sea into the low which resulted in a large area of convective activity with associated heavy rainfall and a low pressure trough over New South Wales allowed the low to move south into the Tasman Sea. Favourable upper-level conditions and ample moisture allowed the system to maintain its identity despite remaining over land for a prolonged period of time. By 30 January, the system had travelled more than 3,000 km (1,900 mi) and its remnants passed south of Sydney in New South Wales, emerging into the Tasman Sea.

== Preparations ==
=== Queensland ===
As a precautionary measure, on 25 January Queensland Premier Campbell Newman ordered the pre-emptive release of water from Wivenhoe Dam to increase the dam's flood mitigation capacity. Releases from North Pine Dam were also made.

=== New South Wales ===
Due to the threat of heavy rains from Oswald, flood warnings were issued for much of northern New South Wales. By 28 January, moderate and major flood warnings were in place for the Bellinger, Kallang, Macleay, Manning, Nambucca, and Tweed Rivers, as well as Camden Haven, the Clarence Valley (including the Orara River), and Hastings. Severe weather warnings were also in place for much of the state, indicating the threat of heavy rains, destructive winds, and dangerous seas. Hundreds of travellers were stranded at Sydney Airport as flights were cancelled due to dangerous winds.

== Floods and severe weather ==
=== Queensland ===
Location	Four-day total to 28 January (mm)
Upper Springbrook	1,453
Gladstone	819.8
Rockhampton	545.4
Bundaberg	484
Innisfail	392.2
Gayndah	364.4
Brisbane	260.4
Townsville	197.2
Source: Rainfall records swamped amid Oswald onslaught

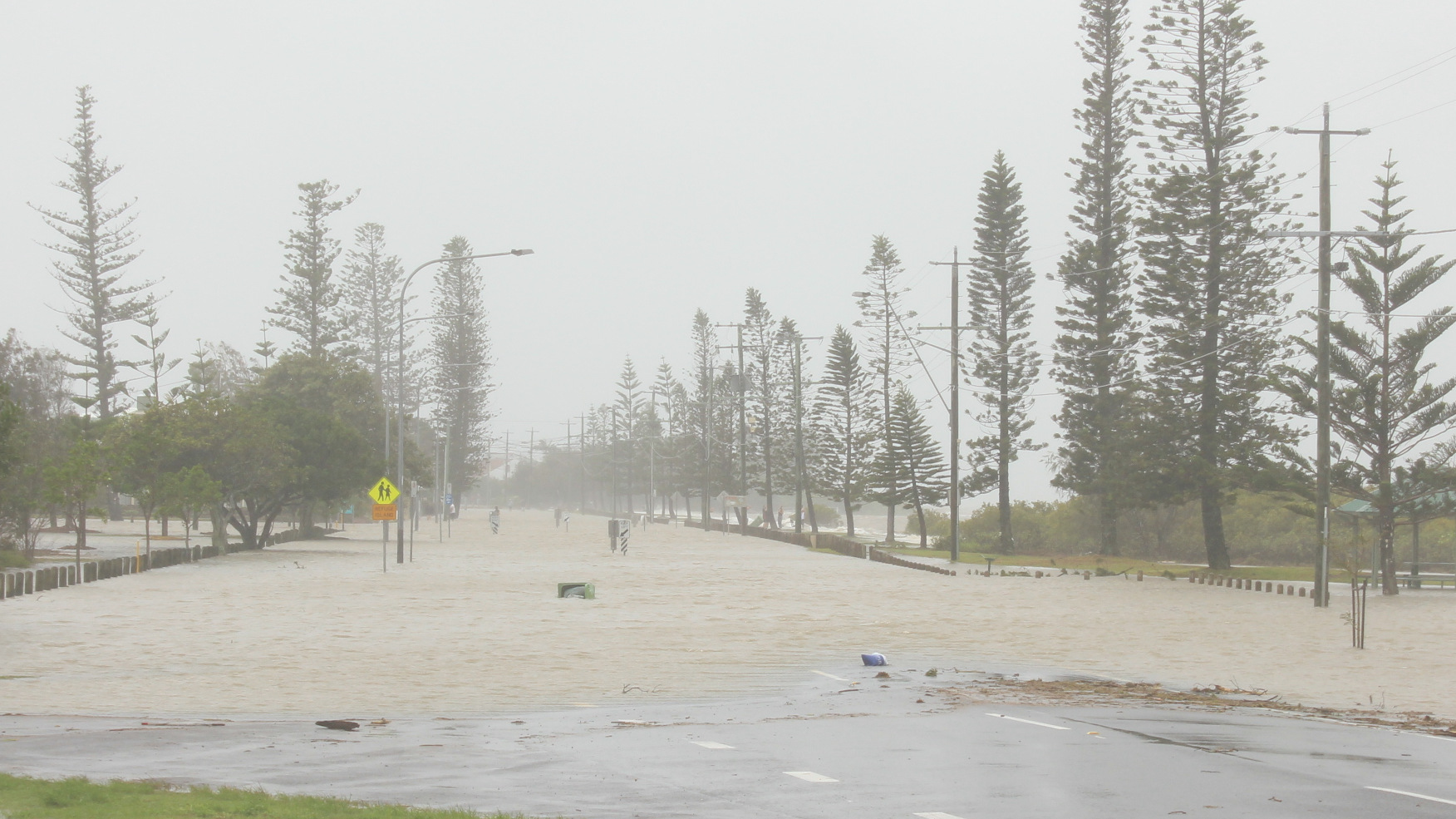
Tidal surge floods road in Cleveland, Queensland on 28 January 2013.

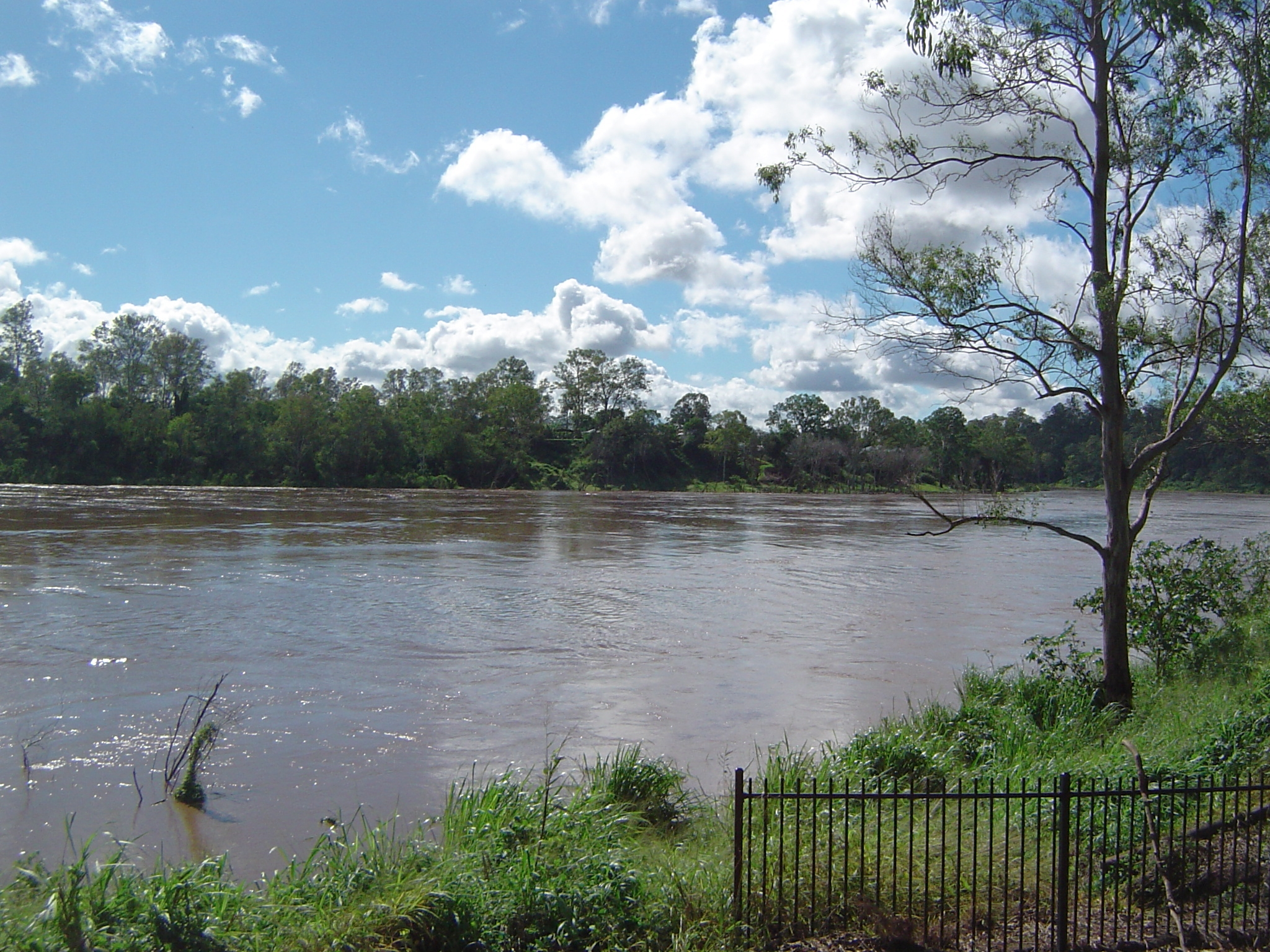
Brisbane River close to its peak at Seventeen Mile Rocks, Brisbane.

Rainfall was initially the heaviest around Tully where approximately 1,000 mm (39 in) of rain fell, with 632 mm (24.9 in) falling over 48 hours. The town of Ingham was completely cut off due to high waters. Residents in the town were advised to stock up on emergency supplies as the Herbert River rose rapidly after 200 mm (7.9 in) of rain fell in the town in just three hours. A brief tornado or waterspout with winds of 140 km/h (87 mph) touched down near Hay Point.

On the afternoon of 26 January, three separate tornadoes tore through the Bundaberg Region. At approximately 1:00 pm, the first tornado struck the town of Bargara, which brought down power lines, tore off roofs and smashed windows. At 3:30 pm, the town of Burnett Heads was battered by a second tornado, and soon after a third tornado struck Coonarr, 6 kilometres (3.7 mi) south of Bargara. The tornadoes injured at least 17 people and damaged 150 properties. Weather conditions favoured tornadic activity because of strong low-level winds which were feeding into the low pressure system.

The Burnett River reached a new recorded height of 9.53 metres (31.3 ft) on 29 January. More than 7,500 residents of Bundaberg were forced to evacuate from about 2,000 homes as the river's waters rose. 130 patients were evacuated from the Bundaberg Hospital to hospitals in Brisbane. Staff and resources from the Department of Health, Queensland Ambulance Service, Australian Defence Force, CareFlight (now LifeFlight) and Royal Flying Doctor Service, including several aircraft, were used to transport patients.

As of 29 January, the floods had claimed the lives of four people, including a three-year-old boy who died after being crushed by a falling tree at Gordon Park. On 28 January, the body of a man who was swept away by floodwaters the day before was pulled from Oxley Creek, while the bodies of two others – a 27-year-old man and an 81-year-old man – were also recovered in Gympie and Burnett Heads respectively. At Gympie flood waters from the Mary River swamped around 100 business and 25 residents. In Maryborough about 50 businesses and 150 homes were inundated as waters from the Mary River rose.

In Mundubbera the Burnett River peaked at 22.9 m at 1 am on 28 January. 100 homes and businesses were inundated in the town with about the same number flooded in the surrounding area. In Gayndah, 60 homes and 12 businesses were flooded. A landslide severed the Burnett Highway between Gayndah and Mundubbera.

Kumbarilla, Kogan and Tara west of Dalby were completely isolated after the new A$4.6 million Wilkie Creek Bridge on Dalby-Kogan road was submerged by rising creek levels as the Moonie Highway flooded. About 40 houses were flooded in the Darling Downs town of Warwick.

Unlike the flooding which occurred in January 2011 at Ipswich and Brisbane, the flooding there was caused by the natural flooding of the creek system rather than deliberate dam releases. Waters in Laidley in the Lockyer Valley reached an all-time high with the main street in the town inundated. At Waterford in Logan City, the Logan River reached a peak of 9 m at midnight on 28 January. Flood waters were slow to recede along the river. A mudslide hit three houses in Logan City.

During 29 January, Brisbane's main water treatment plant at Mount Crosby was shut down after the high levels of sediment and silt in the Brisbane River caused record turbidity levels, which resulted in Seqwater and Queensland Premier, Campbell Newman urging residents to conserve water and to only use it for "drinking, cooking and bathing". Water supplies in some suburbs of Brisbane were expected to run out during 30 January, after an increase in consumption. The Gold Coast Desalination Plant was engaged from standby mode to supplement supplies with 90 megalitres (3.2×10^{6} cu ft) of water a day.

=== New South Wales ===
An estimated 41,000 people were temporarily isolated by flooding in New South Wales. In the Tweed Valley the Tweed River peaked at 3.3 metres (11 ft) on 28 January, the highest level recorded in 30 years. In Grafton the Clarence River peaked a new record height of 8.1 metres (27 ft). Records for the river height in Grafton go back to 1839. The city's levee was credited with preventing more severe flooding. Despite that, around 1,500 people who lived closed to the Clarence River were asked to evacuate on the night of 28 January. Maclean was spared flooding from the Clarence River due to the town's levee. The Clarence Valley was not as fortunate, with many properties cut off and without power. The area was officially declared a disaster zone, as was the Tweed Shire. Minor flooding and road closures were experienced in the Hunter Valley.

== Impact ==
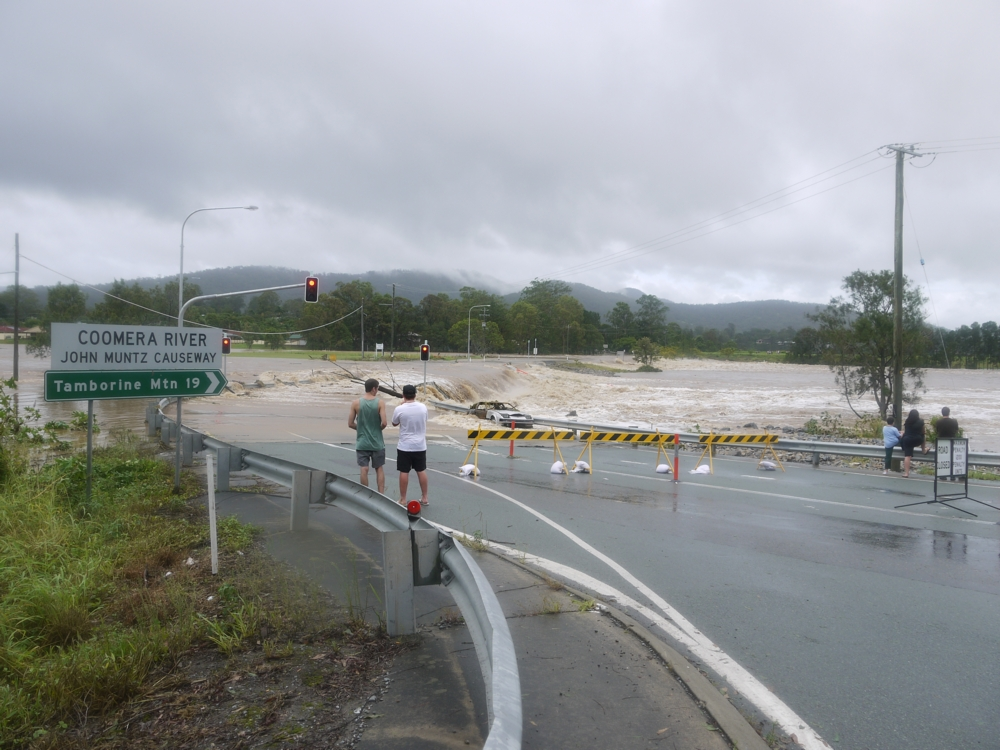
John Muntz Causeway near Oxenford, Qld flooded and closed on 28 January 2013 after heavy rains

In many affected areas the flooding would have been worse had the weather prior to the heavy rains not been so dry. In the 24 hours to 5 am on 27 January the Queensland State Emergency Service logged more than 800 requests for assistance. An exclusion zone was set up by police in Bundaberg North because damaged buildings and infrastructure posed significant safety risks. It wasn't until 2 February before limited access was granted for around 1,000 residents.

By 28 January, nearly a quarter of households in South East Queensland (around 300,000 homes and businesses) experienced power interruptions including 88,000 in Brisbane, 32,000 on the Sunshine Coast, 28,000 in Moreton Bay area and 28,000 on the Gold Coast. About 2,000 powerlines were brought down by storms. More premises lost power in this storm event than in the January 2011 floods. By 9pm 31 January approximately 5,300 premises were still without power.

The main coastal fibre-optic cable was cut near Colosseum causing widespread disruptions. This was followed by further damage to the alternate cable north of Harlin late on 26 January, resulting in widespread failures of mobile, landline, ATM, EFTPOS, broadband services and the 000 Emergency response number. The result of both of Telstra's major communications routes in Queensland being cut was that the towns of Mackay, Freshwater, Cairns, Rockhampton, Mount Morgan, Townsville, Mount Isa and Gladstone were almost completely isolated from communications technology. Telstra services were largely restored within 24 hours of the incident. Power outages resulted in disruptions to a number of Optus phone services.

The rail network in South East Queensland was heavily impacted by the storms, with inner city Brisbane lines particularly affected. The Bruce Highway, Bruxner Highway, Carnarvon Highway and Pacific Highway were all closed for some time. The Gwydir Highway was cut because of a landslide west of Grafton.

Some coal production in Central Queensland had been impacted because of transport disruptions. The Port of Gladstone suspended ship loading on 26 January due to poor weather, however loading resumed the following day. Alumina and liquified natural gas production in the state experienced minor impacts with operations returning to normal levels shortly after the wild weather had passed.

On the evening of 26 January, Awoonga Dam reached a new record water height level of 48.3 metres (158 ft). The citrus industry in the Wide Bay–Burnett region was hit hard with losses totalling hundreds of millions of dollars, higher than the cost of the 2011 floods. In Moreton Bay, seagrass beds are expected to endure greater damage than from the 2011 floods, when is some place 80% of the seafloor vegetation was lost. Sediment flows from the Brisbane River were expected to be much higher in this flood, placing the bay's dugong population at risk.

Impact of extreme weather due to ex-Tropical Cyclone Oswald

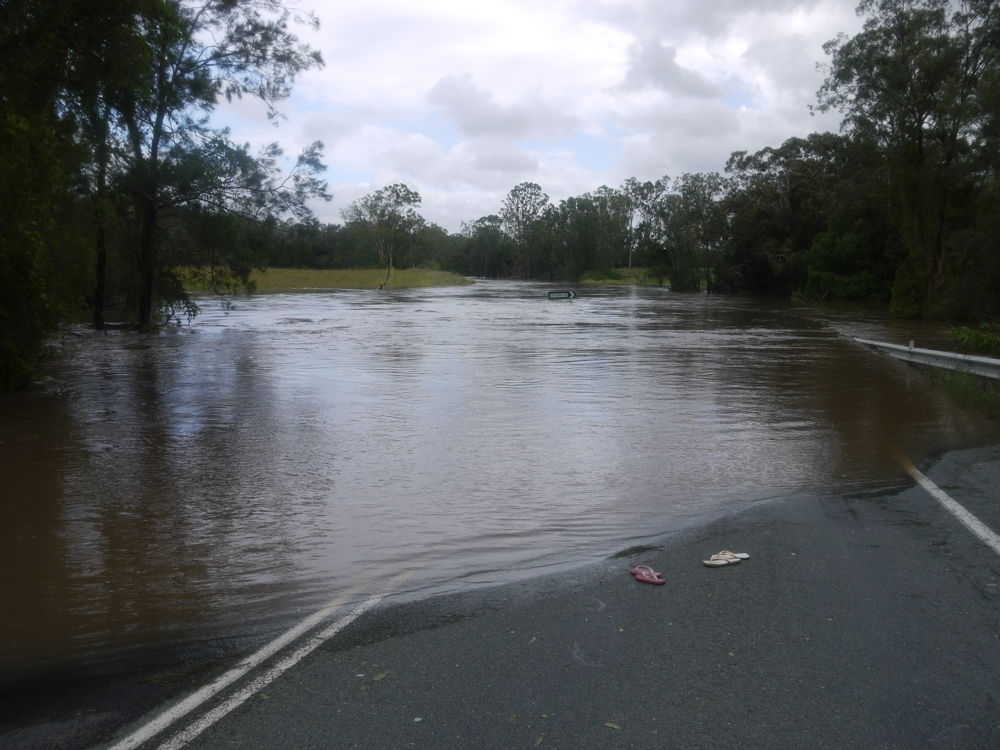
Water over the Beaudesert-Beenleigh Road at Wolffdene near Beenleigh, due to the flooding of the Albert River.

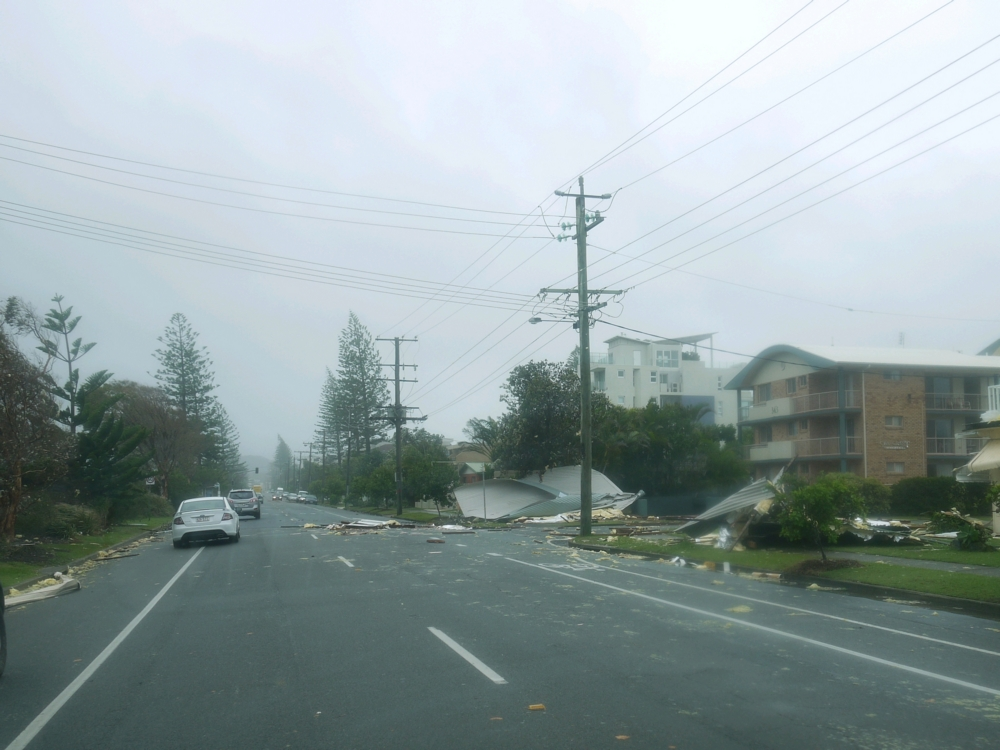
Storm damage to buildings on Golden Four Drive in Tugun

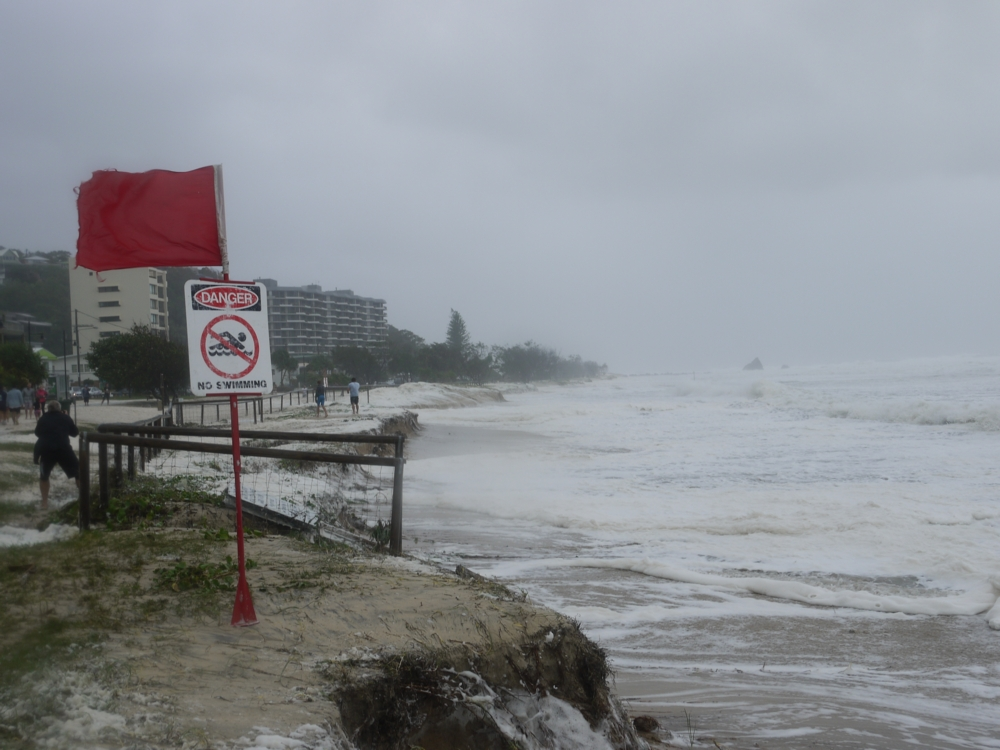
Beach closed to bathers at Currumbin due to dangerous conditions.

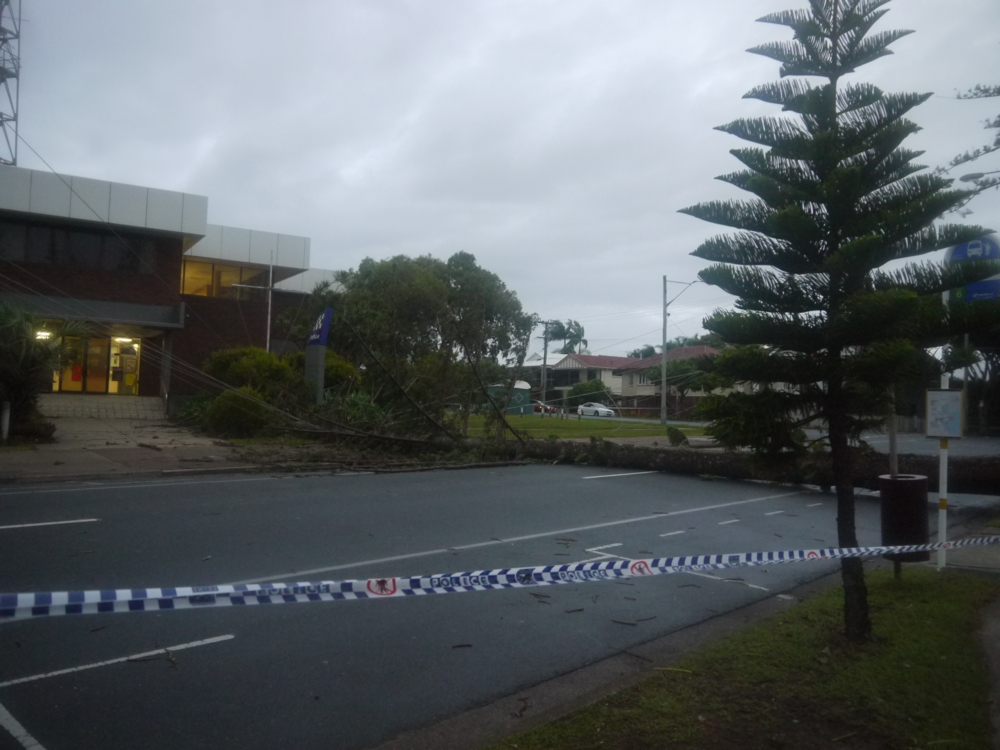
Fallen tree caused by gale-force wind at Redcliffe

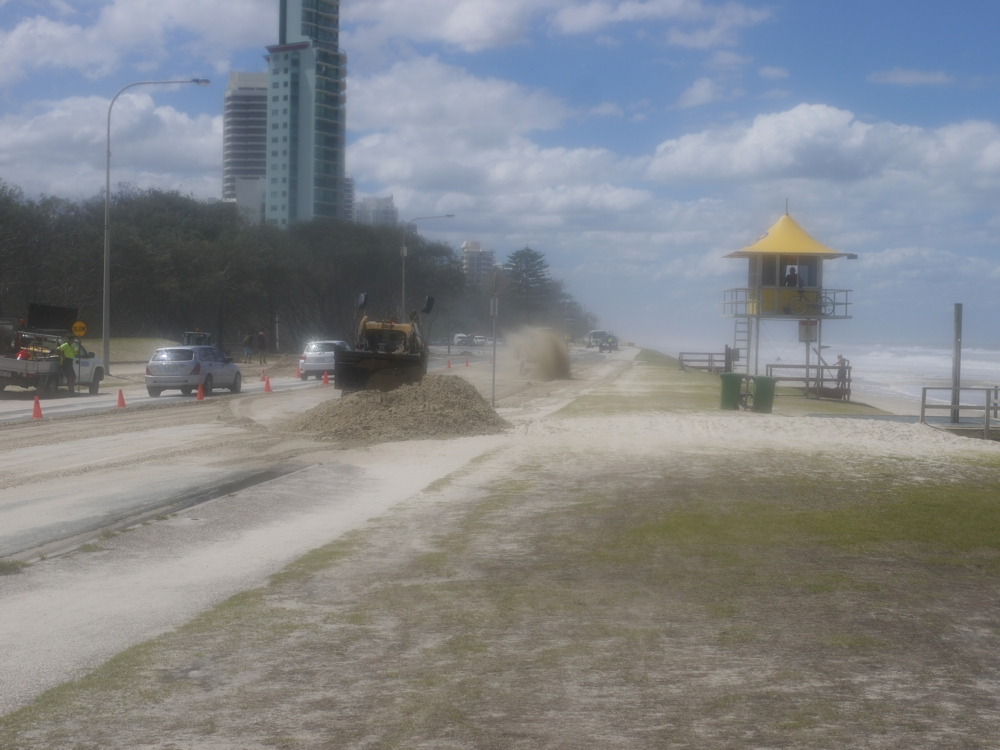
Sand that has been blown in from the beach due to gale-force wind is being removed from Main Beach Parade on 29 January 2013.

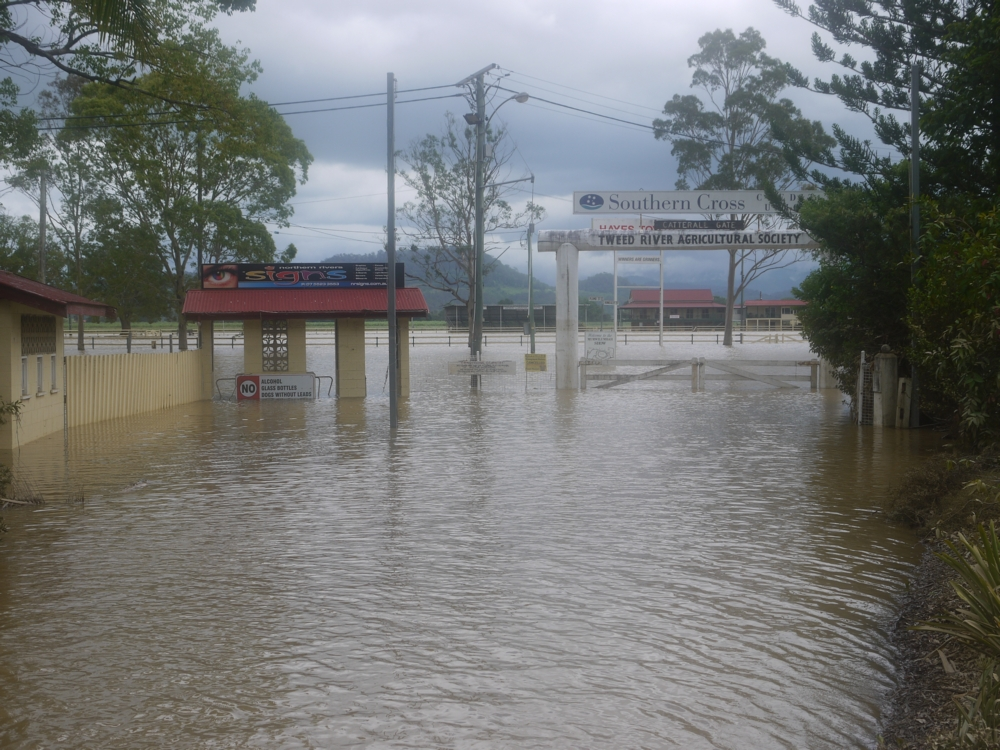
Flooding at local showgrounds, a low-lying area of Murwillumbah.

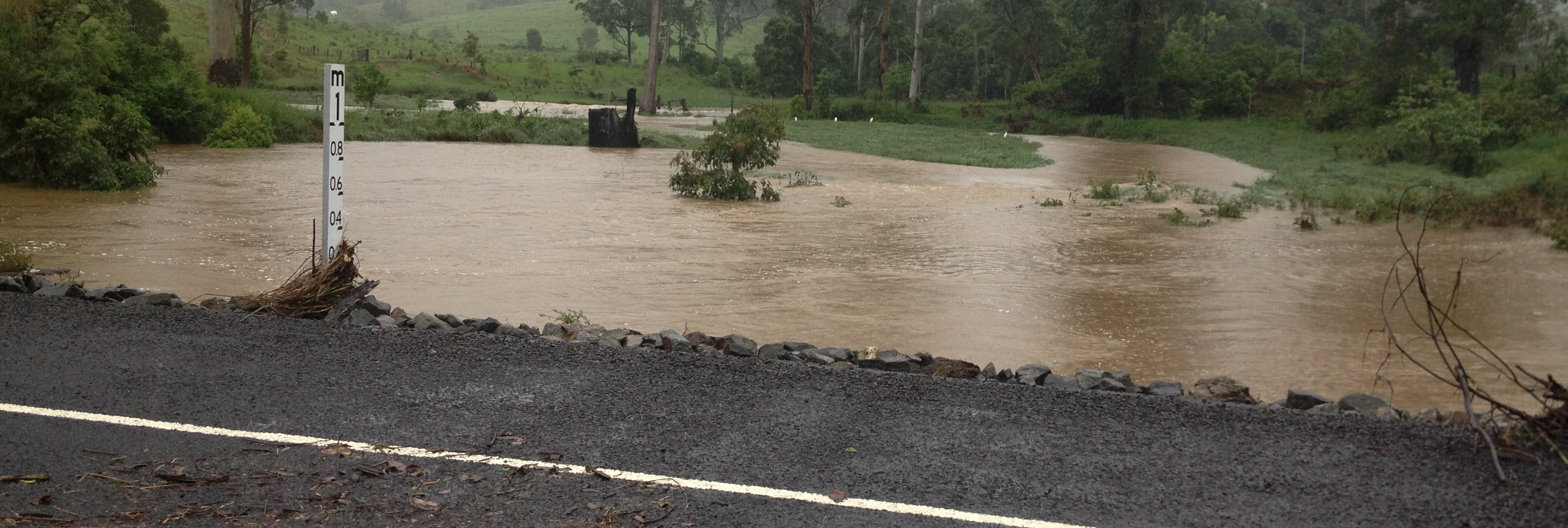
In February, when the flooding resumed, the water level of Coles Creek nearly reached the water level of Maguires Lane, Cooran.

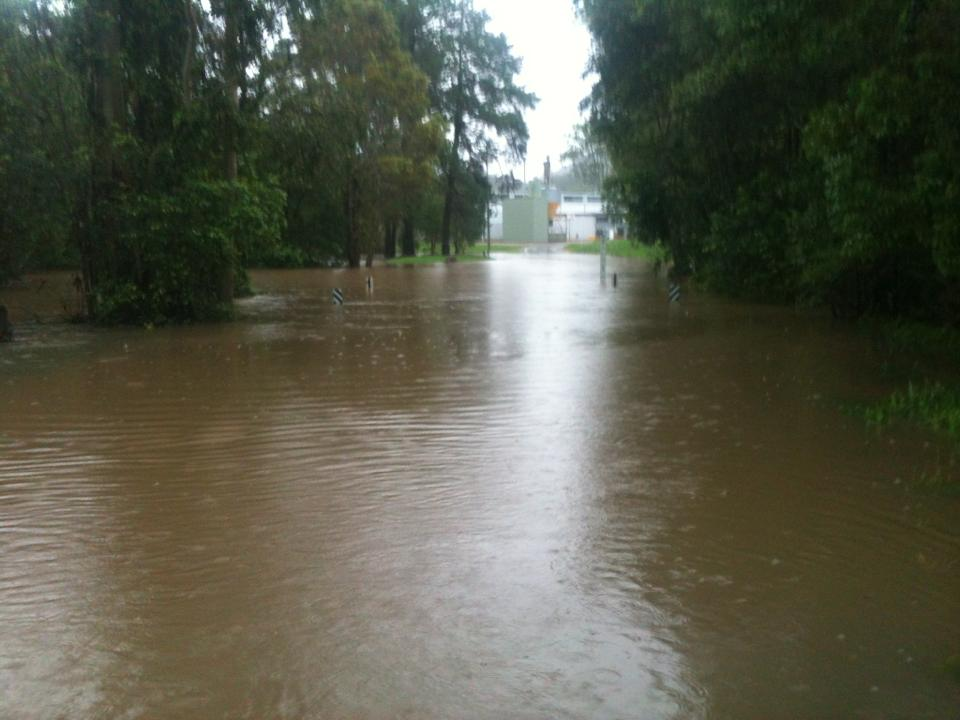
In February, the flood water rose high above the road in Mill Street, Pomona.

== Aftermath ==
Costliest Australian region tropical cyclones
Rank	Tropical cyclones	Season	Damage
1	4 Yasi	2010–11	$3.6 billion
2	4 Debbie	2016–17	$2.73 billion
3	TS Oswald	2012–13	$2.52 billion
4	4 Alfred	2024–25	$1.36 billion
5	4 Veronica	2018–19	$1.2 billion
6	5 Ita	2013–14	$1.15 billion
7	4 Larry	2005–06	$1.1 billion
8	4 Zelia	2024–25	$733 million
9	4 Jasper	2023–24	$670 million
10	3 Tracy	1974–75	$645 million

Campbell Newman launched the Red Cross Flood Appeal on 28 January. The state government donated $1 million to begin the appeal. By 4 February only $6 million had been raised for the flood appeal. Concerns were raised over the low figure as emergency payments alone would need funding of between $15 million to $25 million.

The Government of Queensland disaster assistance was being offered in 21 local government areas shortly after the floods. The new Community Recovery Minister is David Crisafulli whose local government responsibilities were expanded to deal with flood recovery. Plans for relocation rather than re-building as well as the construction of new dams and levees were put forward soon after the floods.

On 1 February Deputy Commissioner of Police, Brett Pointing APM, was appointed to oversee the recovery activities in the Bundaberg and North Burnett Regions. On 3 February it was announced that Colonel Don Cousins AM, CSC would oversee recovery activities in North Queensland with Brigadier Bill Mellor, DSC, AM responsible for southern Queensland. On 8 February it was announced the state and federal governments had reached an agreement concerning funding to avenge public infrastructure. The arrangement which also includes sporting, recreational and community facilities, means that infrastructure can be rebuilt to a higher standard so that it may withstand future disasters.

Around 28,000 claims for insurance were lodged in Queensland.

In February 2013, more flash flooding occurred throughout Queensland and New South Wales, further impacting the damage already created from Cyclone Oswald the previous month, resulting in one death, and the need for some evacuations.

=== Retirement ===
Later in 2013, the name Oswald was retired from the list of names in the Australian Basin. During November 2014 the name was replaced with Osama, although due to the connotations of the name with Osama bin Laden, the name was later removed without being used. It was eventually replaced by Oran. However, later during the 2025-26 season, it was swapped out with Owen, potentially due to it occurring around the same time as the 2026 Iran war.

== See also ==
- Tropical cyclones in 2011
- Weather of 2011
- List of Queensland tropical cyclones

- Cyclone Tasha (2010)

Other significant flood events in Queensland:

- March 2010 Queensland floods
- 2010–11 Queensland floods
- 2022 eastern Australia floods
- 2022 south eastern Australia floods
