= Beelbee, Queensland =

Beelbee
- Suburb
- Interactive map of Beelbee
- Coordinates: 27.1330°S 150.8213°E
- Country: Australia
- State: Queensland
- LGA: Western Downs Region
- Location: 16.0 km (9.9 mi) SSE of Kogan; 50.7 km (31.5 mi) W of Dalby; 59.0 km (36.7 mi) ENE of Tara; 156 km (97 mi) NW of Toowoomba; 261 km (162 mi) WNW of Brisbane

Government
  - State electorate: Warrego
  - Federal division: Maranoa

Area
  - Total: 88.2 km^{2} (34.1 sq mi)

Population
  - Total: 18 (2021 census)
  - Density: 0.204/km^{2} (0.529/sq mi)
- Time zone: UTC+10:00 (AEST)
- Postcode: 4406
Suburbs around Beelbee
Kogan	Kogan	Kogan
Kogan	Beelbee	Kogan
Weranga	Weranga	Kumbarilla

Beelbee is a rural locality in the Western Downs Region, Queensland, Australia. In the 2021 census, Beelbee had a population of 18 people.

== Geography ==
The Dalby Kogan Road forms the northern boundary of the locality. Braemar Creek forms the north-eastern and eastern boundaries, while Braemar Boundary Road forms the south-eastern boundary.

The Braemar State Forest is in the south of the locality, extending into neighbouring Weranga and Kumbarilla and beyond. Apart from this protected area, the predominant surface land use is grazing on native vegetation. However, below the surface of the entire locality, coal seam gas is being extracted by QGC.

== History ==
Braeside State School opened in 1915, but closed on 31 October 1923 due to low student numbers. It reopened on 31 January 1928 and closed permanently in 1950. It was on the eastern side of Beelbee Road (approx 27.11874°S 150.83298°E).

== Demographics ==
In the 2016 census, Beelbee had a population of 25 people.

In the 2021 census, Beelbee had a population of 18 people.

== Education ==
There are no schools in Beelbee. The nearest government primary school is Kogan State School in neighbouring Kogan to the north-west. The nearest government secondary schools are Dalby State High School in Dalby to the east and Tara Shire State College in Tara to the south-west. There are also non-government schools in both Dalby and Tara.
