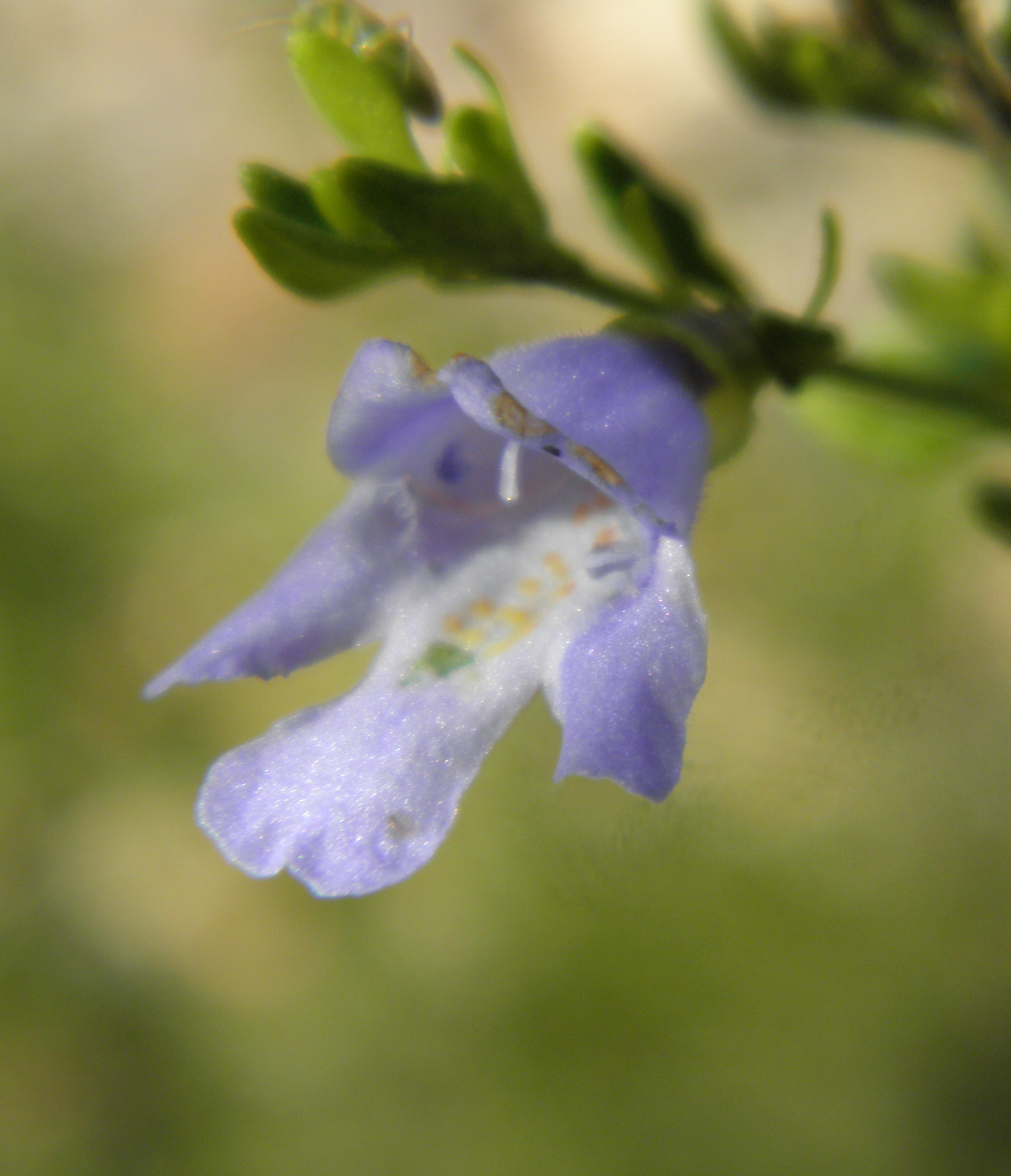

Scientific classification
- Kingdom: Plantae
- Clade: Tracheophytes
- Clade: Angiosperms
- Clade: Eudicots
- Clade: Asterids
- Order: Lamiales
- Family: Lamiaceae
- Genus: Prostanthera
- Species: P. parvifolia

Binomial name
- Prostanthera parvifolia Domin

= Prostanthera parvifolia =

Species of flowering plant

Prostanthera parvifolia is a species of flowering plant in the family Lamiaceae and is endemic to Queensland. It is an upright shrub with small, pale green leaves and mostly deep mauve flowers.

== Description ==
Prostanthera parvifolia is a small, upright shrub 1–2 m (3 ft 3 in – 6 ft 7 in) tall with small, oblanceolate, almost sessile leaves about 7–10 mm (0.28–0.39 in) long and tiny, deep mauve to violet flowers borne in leaf axils.

== Taxonomy and naming ==
Prostanthera parvifolia was first formally described in 1928 by Karel Domin and the description was published in Bibliotheca Botanica. The specific epithet (parvifolia) means "small leaves".

== Distribution and habitat ==
This species is found growing in mallee scrub at Glenmorgan, Gurulmundi, Carnarvon Range, Pentland, Tara, Kogan and the Warrego Range.
