= Wieambilla =

- Suburb
- Interactive map of Wieambilla
- Coordinates: 26.9675°S 150.4097°E
- Country: Australia
- State: Queensland
- LGA: Western Downs Region
- Location: 37.3 km (23.2 mi) SW of Chinchilla; 63.1 km (39.2 mi) N of Tara; 103 km (64 mi) NW of Dalby; 186 km (116 mi) NW of Toowoomba; 314 km (195 mi) WNW of Brisbane

Government
  - State electorate: Warrego
  - Federal division: Maranoa

Area
  - Total: 264.9 km^{2} (102.3 sq mi)

Population
  - Total: 78 (2021 census)
  - Density: 0.2945/km^{2} (0.763/sq mi)
- Time zone: UTC+10:00 (AEST)
- Postcode: 4413
Suburbs around Wieambilla
Nangram	Crossroads	Crossroads
Condamine	Wieambilla	Montrose
The Gums	Tara	Tara

Wieambilla is a rural locality in the Western Downs Region, Queensland, Australia. This locality and its surroundings are extensively used for coal seam gas harvesting. In the 2021 census, Wieambilla had a population of 78 people.

== Geography ==
The Condamine State Forest is in the west of the locality, extending into neighbouring Condamine to the west.

== History ==
The locality takes its name from the name of a parish, which in turn was named after a pastoral run operated by Charles George Temple Chauvel in the 1850s, which may have been named after the Wieambilla Creek.

Wieambilla Sawmills Provisional School opened in 1915 and closed circa 1926.

=== Shootings ===
Police constables Matthew Arnold and Rachel McCrow, and a neighbour, Alan Dare, were murdered on 12 December 2022 at a rural property in Wieambilla. The perpetrators, brothers Gareth and Nathaniel Train, and Gareth's wife, Stacey Train, were later shot and killed by Queensland police. Gareth was a known conspiracy theorist who alleged the Port Arthur massacre was a false flag operation and that Princess Diana was killed in a 'blood sacrifice'. Nathaniel was a former school principal.

== Demographics ==
In the 2016 census, Wieambilla had a population of 93 people.

In the 2021 census, Wieambilla had a population of 78 people.

== Education ==
There are no schools in Wieambilla. The nearest government primary schools are:

- Condamine State School in neighbouring Condamine to the west
- Chinchilla State School in Chinchilla to the north-east
- Kogan State School in Kogan to the east
- Tara Shire State College in Tara to the south

The nearest government secondary schools are Tara Shire State College in Tara to the south and Chinchilla State High School in Chinchilla to the north-east.
