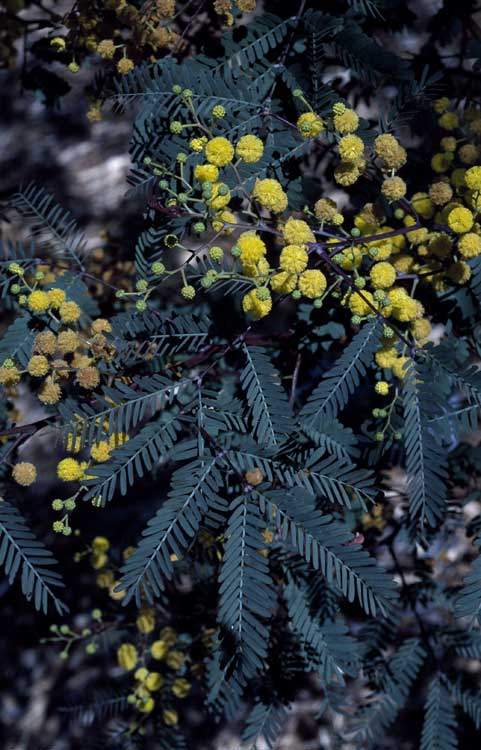

Scientific classification
- Kingdom: Plantae
- Clade: Tracheophytes
- Clade: Angiosperms
- Clade: Eudicots
- Clade: Rosids
- Order: Fabales
- Family: Fabaceae
- Subfamily: Caesalpinioideae
- Clade: Mimosoid clade
- Genus: Acacia
- Species: A. debilis

Binomial name
- Acacia debilis Tndale
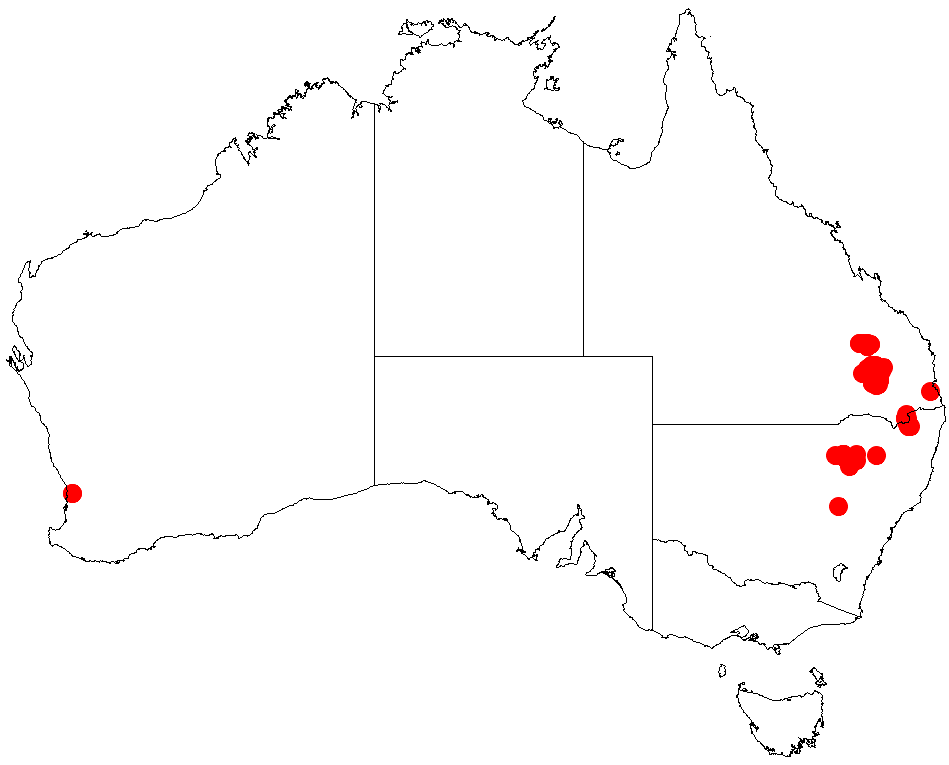
- Occurrence data from AVH

Synonyms
- Racosperma debile Pedley

= Acacia debilis =

Spindly wattle

Species of legume

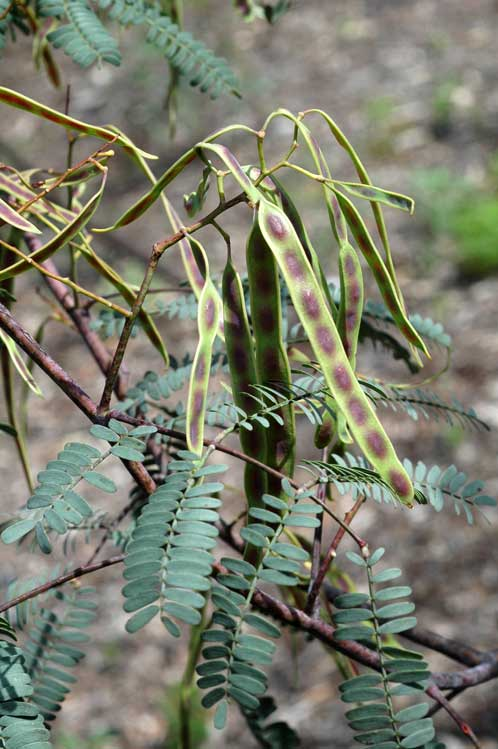
Pods in Mount Annan Botanic Garden

Acacia debilis, commonly known as spindly wattle, is a species of flowering plant in the family Fabaceae and is endemic to eastern Australia. It is a spindly shrub or tree with leathery, bipinnate leaves, spherical heads of yellow or golden yellow flowers and straight-sided, more or less leathery pods.

== Description ==
Acacia debilis is a spindly, erect or spreading shrub or tree that typically grows to a height of 2.5–6 m (8–20 ft) and has smooth greyish to reddish green bark. Its branchlets are terete, sometimes ridged and glabrous. The leaves are bipinnate and leathery, on a petiole 10–40 mm (0.39–1.57 in) long, with up to 4 pairs of pinnae, each with 5 to 17 pairs of more or less oblong to narrowly oblong pinnules 6–20 mm (0.24–0.79 in) long and 2–6 mm (0.079–0.236 in) wide on a rhachis 10–70 mm (0.39–2.76 in) long. The flowers are borne in 8 o 25 spherical heads in racemes in leaf axils on a peduncle 3–8 mm (0.12–0.31 in) long, each head 4–7.5 mm (0.16–0.30 in) in diameter with 15 to 33 bright yellow or golden yellow flowers. Flowering occurs between July and September and the pods are straight to slightly curved, 55–135 mm (2.2–5.3 in) long and 9–13.5 mm (0.35–0.53 in) wide and thinly leathery with a white powdery coating.

== Taxonomy ==
Acacia debilis was first formally described in 1978 by Mary Tindale in the journal Telopea from specimens collected near Wambo Creek, 17.2 km (10.7 mi) south-west of Kogan in 1975. The specific epithet (debilis) means 'weak', 'feeble' or 'frail', referring to the habit of this species.

== Distribution ==
Spindly wattle is found in from Taroom in south eastern Queensland to the Pilliga forest and Tenterfield in northern New South Wales where it grows along creek banks, often in dry sclerophyll forest or woodland, in sandy soils.

== See also ==
- List of Acacia species
