= Weranga, Queensland =

Weranga
- Suburb
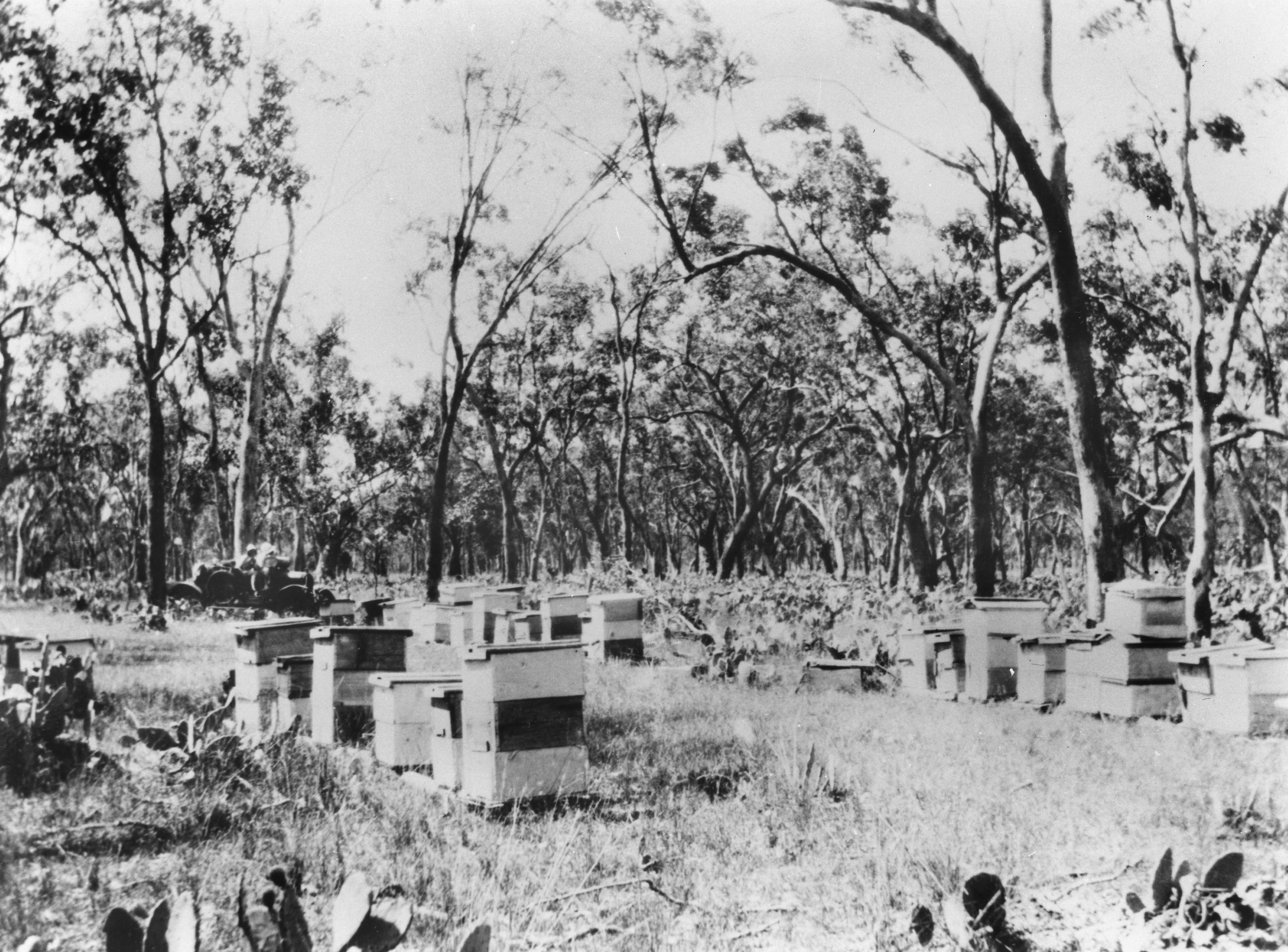
- John Schutt's apiary at Weranga, circa 1926

- Interactive map of Weranga
- Coordinates: 27.2641°S 150.7544°E
- Country: Australia
- State: Queensland
- LGA: Western Downs Region
- Location: 26.4 km (16.4 mi) E of Tara; 66.5 km (41.3 mi) W of Dalby; 149 km (93 mi) WNW of Toowoomba; 276 km (171 mi) W of Brisbane

Government
  - State electorate: Warrego
  - Federal division: Maranoa

Area
  - Total: 221.7 km^{2} (85.6 sq mi)

Population
  - Total: 208 (2021 census)
  - Density: 0.9382/km^{2} (2.430/sq mi)
- Time zone: UTC+10:00 (AEST)
- Postcode: 4405
Suburbs around Weranga
Goranba	Kogan	Beelbee
Goranba	Weranga	Kumbarilla
Goranba	Marmadua	Marmadua

Weranga is a rural locality in the Western Downs Region, Queensland, Australia. In the 2021 census, Weranga had a population of 208 people.

== Geography ==
The Glenmorgan railway line traverses the locality from the south-east (Kumbarilla) to the south-west (Goranba). The locality is served by Weranga railway station on the Weranga North Road (27.3044°S 150.7281°E).

== History ==
The locality's name is derived from the parish name and from an early pastoral run established in 1848 by John and Alfred Crowder. The name is believed to be an Aboriginal word meaning a large gathering of Aboriginal Australians.

Weranga Provisional School opened in 1923, but closed in 1924.

== Demographics ==
In the 2016 census, Weranga had a population of 215 people.

In the 2021 census, Weranga had a population of 208 people.

== Education ==
There are no schools in Weranga. The nearest government primary schools are Kogan State School in neighbouring Kogan to the north and Tara Shire State College in Tara to the west. The nearest government secondary school is Tara Shire State College.
