= Kumbarilla, Queensland =

Kumbarilla
- Town
- Interactive map of Kumbarilla
- Coordinates: 27.3158°S 150.8761°E
- Country: Australia
- State: Queensland
- LGA: Western Downs Region
- Location: 35.9 km (22.3 mi) WSW of Dalby; 56.5 km (35.1 mi) E of Tara; 118 km (73 mi) WNW of Toowoomba; 243 km (151 mi) W of Brisbane

Government
  - State electorate: Warrego
  - Federal division: Maranoa

Area
  - Total: 249.6 km^{2} (96.4 sq mi)

Population
  - Total: 223 (2021 census)
  - Density: 0.8934/km^{2} (2.314/sq mi)
- Time zone: UTC+10:00 (AEST)
- Postcode: 4405
Localities around Kumbarilla
Beelbee	Kogan	Ducklo
Weranga	Kumbarilla	Ducklo
Marmadua	Halliford	Halliford

Kumbarilla is a rural town and locality in the Western Downs Region, Queensland, Australia. In the 2021 census, the locality of Kumbarilla had a population of 223 people.

== Geography ==
The locality ranges from 350m to 400m above sea level. The town is located in the south-west corner of the locality immediately to the south of the Kumbarilla railway station (27.3150°S 150.8761°E) on the Glenmorgan railway line; there are very few buildings in the surveyed town plan area. Another station on the line was Gulera railway station (27.2950°S 150.9396°E) which is now abandoned.

The Glenmorgan railway line passes from east (Ducklo) to south-west (Weranga) through the southern part of the locality.

The Moonie Highway also passes from the south-east (Ducklo) to the south (Marmadua), always south of the railway line and does not pass through the town; the junction of the highway with the Surat Developmental Road is at the south-western edge of the locality.

The Braemer State Forest is in the north-west of the locality. In addition, there are two smaller state forests in the locality: Daandine State Forest and Weranga State Forest. Apart from these, the land is predominantly freehold used for grazing.

Despite its name, the Kumbarilla State Forest is not within Kumbarilla but is immediately to the south of Kumbarilla's southern border in Marmadua and Halliford.

Geologically Kumbarilla is part of the Surat Basin.

== History ==
The town takes its name from its railway station which was in turn an Aboriginal word in a local dialect meaning ironbark tree/timber.

Kumbarilla Provisional School opened in 1913 and became Kumbarilla State School on 1 December 1918. The school closed about 1923.

In March 1918, the Queensland government offered 18 town lots of 1 rood (0.25 acres; 1,000 m^{2}) for sale as perpetual leases.

== Demographics ==
In the 2006 census, the locality of Kumbarilla had a population of 241 people.

In the 2016 census, the locality of Kumbarilla had a population of 197 people.

In the 2021 census, the locality of Kumbarilla had a population of 223 people.

== Economy ==
Almost all of Kumbarilla is subject to a petroleum lease for coal seam gas with a grid of wells and pipelines in the northern and south-western parts of the locality. The Ruby Jo gas compression facility operated by QGC is located on Kumbarilla road south of the Braemer State Forest.

== Education ==
There are no schools in Kumbarilla. The nearest government primary schools are Tara Shire State College in Tara to the west, Kogan State School in neighbouring Kogan to the north, and Dalby State School in Dalby to the north-west. The nearest government secondary schools are Tara Shire State College in Tara and Dalby State High School in Dalby.

== Popular culture ==
Kumbarilla is one of the places listed in the first version of the song I've Been Everywhere.
