= Ranges Bridge, Queensland =

Ranges Bridge
- Suburb
- Interactive map of Ranges Bridge
- Coordinates: 27.1463°S 151.0852°E
- Country: Australia
- State: Queensland
- LGA: Western Downs Region
- Location: 17.1 km (10.6 mi) NW of Dalby; 99.9 km (62.1 mi) NW of Toowoomba; 264 km (164 mi) WNW of Brisbane

Government
  - State electorate: Warrego
  - Federal division: Maranoa

Area
  - Total: 154.8 km^{2} (59.8 sq mi)

Population
  - Total: 98 (2021 census)
  - Density: 0.633/km^{2} (1.640/sq mi)
- Time zone: UTC+10:00 (AEST)
- Postcode: 4405
Suburbs around Ranges Bridge
| Macalister | Macalister | Macalister |
| Kogan | Ranges Bridge | Dalby |
| Ducklo | Ducklo | Nandi |

Ranges Bridge is a rural locality in the Western Downs Region, Queensland, Australia. In the 2021 census, Ranges Bridge had a population of 98 people.

== History ==
The locality takes its name from the Range's Bridge, a bridge over the Condamine River, on the road from Dalby west to Daandine, Kogan and Condamine, where Mrs Mary J. Range had operated the Bridge Hotel since at least 1865. The bridge Ranges Bridge can still be seen on a 1971 map.

Ranges Bridge Provisional School opened circa 1886 and closed in June 1894. The school building was then relocated and reopened as Macalister Provisional School on 27 August 1894. On 1 January 1909, it became Macalister State School. In 1913, it was renamed Apunyal State School. It closed circa 1935.

The Riverview Hotel was burned down in July 1910.

== Demographics ==
In the 2016 census, Ranges Bridge had a population of 132 people.

In the 2021 census, Ranges Bridge had a population of 98 people.

== Education ==
There are no schools in Ranges Bridge. The nearest government primary and secondary schools are Dalby State School and Dalby State High School, both in neighbouring Dalby to the east. There are also non-government schools in Dalby.
