= Ducklo, Queensland =

Ducklo
- Suburb
- Interactive map of Ducklo
- Coordinates: 27.2702°S 151.04°E
- Country: Australia
- State: Queensland
- LGA: Western Downs Region
- Location: 26.9 km (16.7 mi) WSW of Dalby; 59.2 km (36.8 mi) SE of Kogan; 109 km (68 mi) NW of Toowoomba; 237 km (147 mi) W of Brisbane

Government
  - State electorate: Warrego
  - Federal division: Maranoa

Area
  - Total: 271.7 km^{2} (104.9 sq mi)

Population
  - Total: 306 (2021 census)
  - Density: 1.1262/km^{2} (2.917/sq mi)
- Time zone: UTC+10:00 (AEST)
- Postcode: 4405
Suburbs around Ducklo
Kogan	Ranges Bridge	Nandi
Kumbarilla	Ducklo	Nandi
Kumbarilla	Halliford	Nandi

Ducklo is a rural locality in the Western Downs Region, Queensland, Australia. In the 2021 census, Ducklo had a population of 306 people.

== Geography ==
The Glenmorgan railway line passes from the north-east (Nandi) to the west (Kumbarilla) of the locality. The locality is served by Ducklo railway station (27.2531°S 151.0114°E).

The Moonie Highway also passes from the north-east (Nandi) to the south-west of the locality (Kumbarilla) but to the south of the railway line.

The land use is a mix of crop growing (mostly towards the north-east of the locality) and grazing on native vegetation (mostly towards the south-west of the locality).

== History ==
The name Ducklo may refer to low-flying ducks along the Clay Hole Gully.

Ducklo railway siding was a mail receiving office from 1913. It subsequently became a post office. It closed in 1970.

Ducklo State School opened on 25 January 1915. It closed in 1963. It was on a 5-acre (2.0 ha) site at 588 Ducklo School Road (27.2415°S 151.0147°E).

Kupunn State School opened on 6 August 1913 and closed on 31 December 1963 due to low student numbers. It was on a 5-acre (2.0 ha) site at 408 Kupunn Road (27.22292°S 151.11776°E).

The Anglican Church of the Holy Apostles was dedicated on 12 October 1915 by Archbishop St Clair Donaldson. Its last service was held in October 1941. The church building was relocated to Bowenville where it was dedicated as St Luke's Anglican Church on 30 March 1952 by Venerable Frank Knight. It closed in Bowenville on 31 March 1982.

== Demographics ==
In the 2016 census, Ducklo had a population of 333 people.

In the 2021 census, Ducklo had a population of 306 people.

== Education ==
There are no schools in Ducklo. The nearest government primary schools are Dalby State School in Dalby to the north-east and Kogan State School in neighbouring Kogan to the north-west. The nearest government secondary school is Dalby State High School in Dalby.
