= Halliford, Queensland =

Halliford
- Suburb
- Interactive map of Halliford
- Coordinates: 27.4558°S 150.9547°E
- Country: Australia
- State: Queensland
- LGA: Western Downs Region
- Location: 53.2 km (33.1 mi) SW of Dalby; 126 km (78 mi) W of Toowoomba; 246 km (153 mi) W of Brisbane

Government
  - State electorate: Warrego
  - Federal division: Maranoa

Area
  - Total: 551.2 km^{2} (212.8 sq mi)

Population
  - Total: 4 (2021 census)
  - Density: 0.0073/km^{2} (0.0188/sq mi)
- Time zone: UTC+10:00 (AEST)
- Postcode: 4406
Suburbs around Halliford
| Kumbarilla | Ducklo | Nandi; Grassdale |
| Marmadua | Halliford | Cecil Plains |
| Cattle Creek | Dunmore | Cecil Plains |

Halliford is a rural locality in the Western Downs Region, Queensland, Australia. In the 2021 census, Halliford had a population of 4 people.

Halliford's postcode is 4406.

== Geography ==
Almost all of the locality is within the Kumbarilla State Forest apart from two areas in the north of the locality which are used for grazing on native vegetation.

Coal seam gas is being extracted across the north of the locality by QGC, a subsidiary of Shell. It has created conflict with local farmers.

Burnett Waterhole on Wilkie Creek is in the south-west of the locality (27.5166°S 150.9166°E).

== History ==
The location takes its name from an early pastoral run operated by Watson and Roebuck in 1864.

== Demographics ==
In the 2016 census, Halliford had "no people or a very low population".

In the 2021 census, Halliford had a population of 4 people.

== Education ==
There are no schools in Halliford. The nearest primary and secondary schools are Dalby State School and Dalby State High School, both in Dalby to the north-east.
