= Hopeland, Queensland =

Hopeland
- Suburb
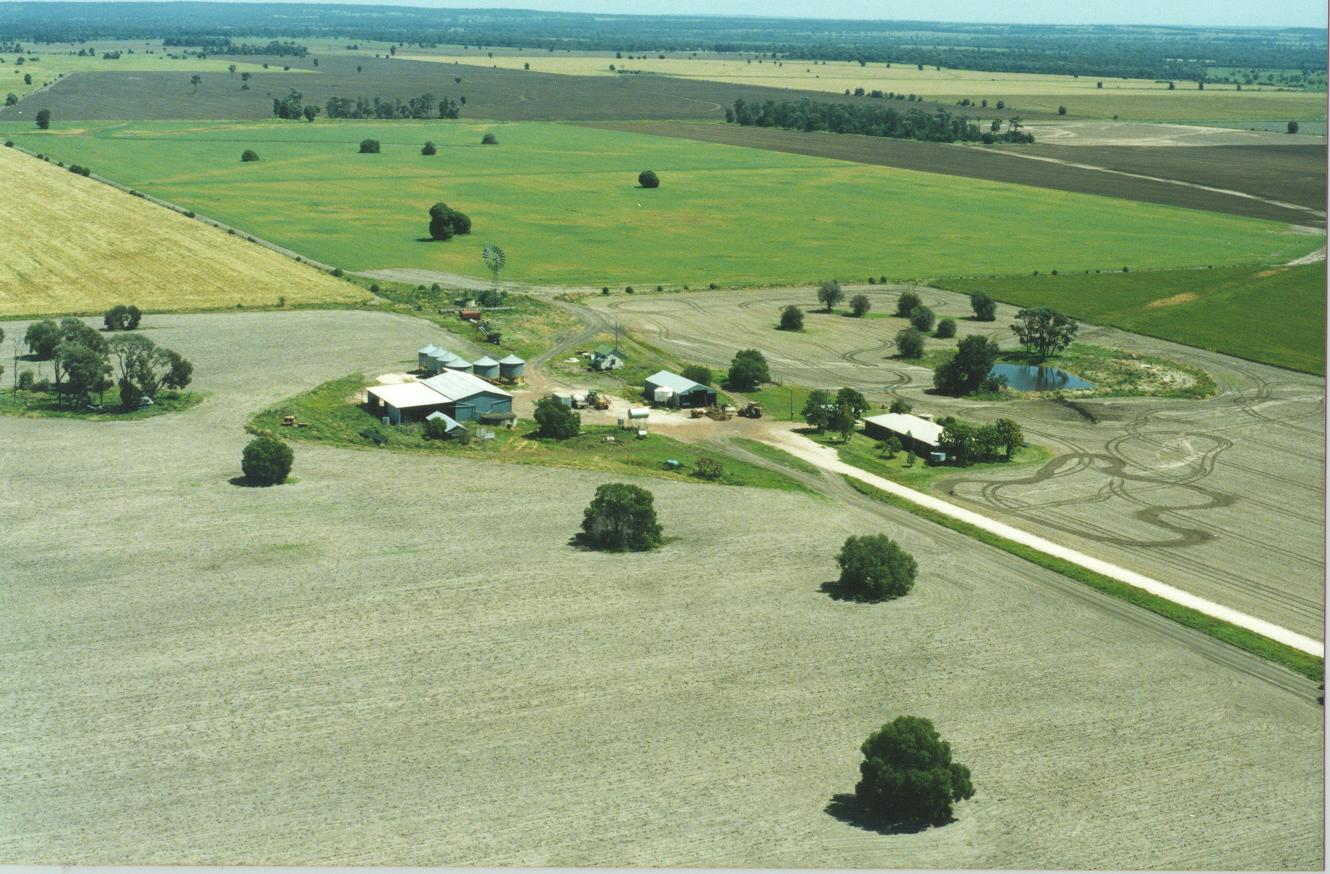
- Aerial view of a farm in Hopeland, 2002

- Interactive map of Hopeland
- Coordinates: 26.8841°S 150.6655°E
- Country: Australia
- State: Queensland
- LGA: Western Downs Region
- Location: 21.4 km (13.3 mi) S of Chinchilla; 83.3 km (51.8 mi) NW of Dalby; 166 km (103 mi) NW of Toowoomba; 294 km (183 mi) WNW of Brisbane

Government
  - State electorate: Callide
  - Federal division: Maranoa

Area
  - Total: 274.6 km^{2} (106.0 sq mi)

Population
  - Total: 128 (2021 census)
  - Density: 0.4661/km^{2} (1.207/sq mi)
- Time zone: UTC+10:00 (AEST)
- Postcode: 4413
Suburbs around Hopeland
Chinchilla	Chinchilla	Boonarga
Crossroads	Hopeland	Brigalow
Montrose	Kogan	Brigalow

Hopeland is a rural locality in the Western Downs Region, Queensland, Australia. In the 2021 census, Hopeland had a population of 128 people.

== Geography ==
Hopeland is located south-east of Chinchilla, on the Darling Downs famous for its rich black, fertile soils. The district is situated on the Southern Brigalow Belt bioregion of Queensland. The northern boundary of the locality is the Condamine River, while the south-western boundary is Wambo Creek (a tributary of the Condamine River).

== History ==
Hopeland State School opened on 8 February 1937 with its first teacher Lionel Stevens with an average attendance of 16 students in its first year. It was mothballed on 4 November 2006 and closed on 23 October 2007. It was at 821 Chinchilla-Kogan Road (corner of Hopeland School Road, 26.8502°S 150.6679°E). The school's website was archived.

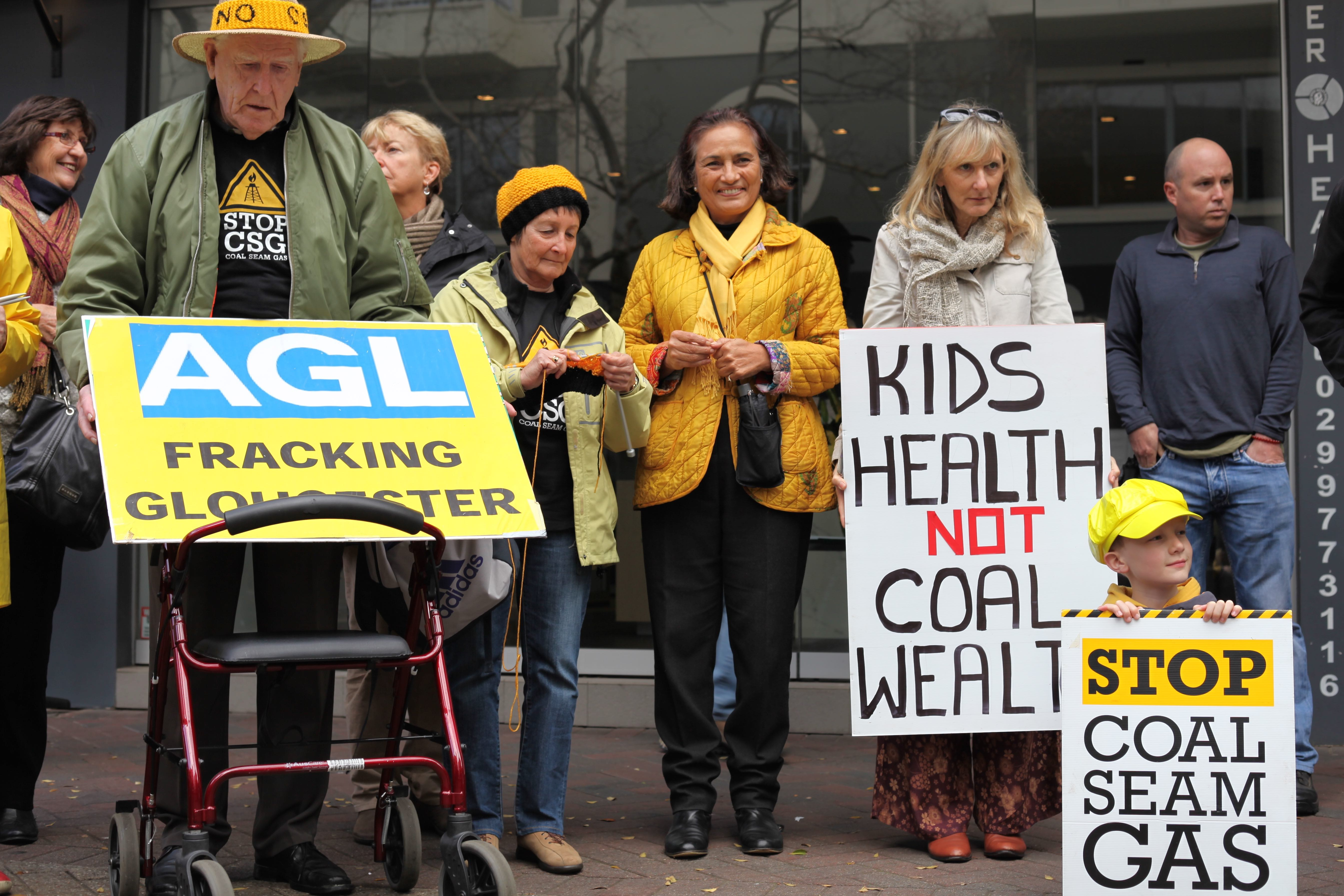
Lock the Gate petition delivery in Sydney, July 2015

In July 2015, representatives of Hopeland and neighbouring areas took a petition signed by more than 9,000 people to Sydney to present to Prime Minister Tony Abbott asking him to prevent fracking on farms and near residential properties without landholder consent and health impact assessments to be mandated for coal seam gas projects.

== Demographics ==
In the 2016 census, Hopeland had a population of 140 people.

In the 2021 census, Hopeland had a population of 128 people.

== Economy ==
The heavy black soil on which the district sits is considered in the top 3% of Australia for broad acre agriculture mainly due to its high field capacity and yield potential. The area uses both dryland farming and irrigation to produce sorghum, cotton, corn, wheat, millet, chick pea, mung bean, barley, triticale and oats. Given the high nutrient value of the soil, the district continually wins both state and national cropping competitions, most recently with a dryland sorghum crop yielding over 10 tonnes per hectare or over 4 tonnes per acre.

All of the locality is within petroleum leases to extract coal seam gas. The extraction of coal seam gas within farming districts is controversial in Australia due to concerns that groundwater under prime grazing and cropping land could be contaminated. In April 2018 one operator in Hopeland, Linc Energy, was fined $4.5 million in May 2019, in undefended proceedings, for causing environmental harm through its underground coal gasification plant.

== Education ==
There are no schools in Hopeland. The nearest government primary schools are Chinchilla State School in neighbouring Chinchilla to the north, Brigalow State School in neighbouring Brigalow to the east, and Kogan State School in neighbouring Kogan to the south. The nearest government secondary school is Chinchilla State High School in neighbouring Chinchilla to the north.
