= Crossroads, Queensland =

Crossroads
- Suburb
- Interactive map of Crossroads
- Coordinates: 26.8827°S 150.4819°E
- Country: Australia
- State: Queensland
- LGA: Western Downs Region
- Location: 30.1 km (18.7 mi) SW of Chinchilla; 88.8 km (55.2 mi) NW of Dalby; 170 km (110 mi) NW of Toowoomba; 296 km (184 mi) WNW of Brisbane

Government
  - State electorate: Callide
  - Federal division: Maranoa

Area
  - Total: 291.5 km^{2} (112.5 sq mi)

Population
  - Total: 127 (2021 census)
  - Density: 0.4357/km^{2} (1.128/sq mi)
- Time zone: UTC+10:00 (AEST)
- Postcode: 4413
Suburbs around Crossroads
Greenswamp	Greenswamp	Chinchilla
Nangram	Crossroads	Hopeland
Wieambilla	Wieambilla	Montrose

Crossroads is a rural locality in the Western Downs Region, Queensland, Australia. In the 2021 census, Crossroads had a population of 127 people.

== Geography ==
The Condamine Kogan Road traverses the locality from south-east (Hopeland / Montrose) to south-west (Nangram /Wieambilla). The Chinchilla Tara Road traverses the locality from north (Greenswamp) to south (Wieambilla). These two roads intersect in roughly the centre of the locality and presumably provide the name for the locality.

Gunbarwood is a neighbourhood (26.8833°S 150.55°E). It presumably takes its name from the Gunbarwood rural property.

The land use is a mixture of dry and irrigated crops and grazing on native vegetation.

Coal seam gas is extracted throughout the locality.

== Demographics ==
In the 2016 census, Crossroads had a population of 130 people.

In the 2021 census, Crossroads had a population of 127 people.

== Education ==
There are no schools in Crossroads. The nearest primary and secondary schools are Chinchilla State School and Chinchilla State High School in neighbouring Chinchilla to the north-east.
