= Glenmorgan railway line =

Glenmorgan line
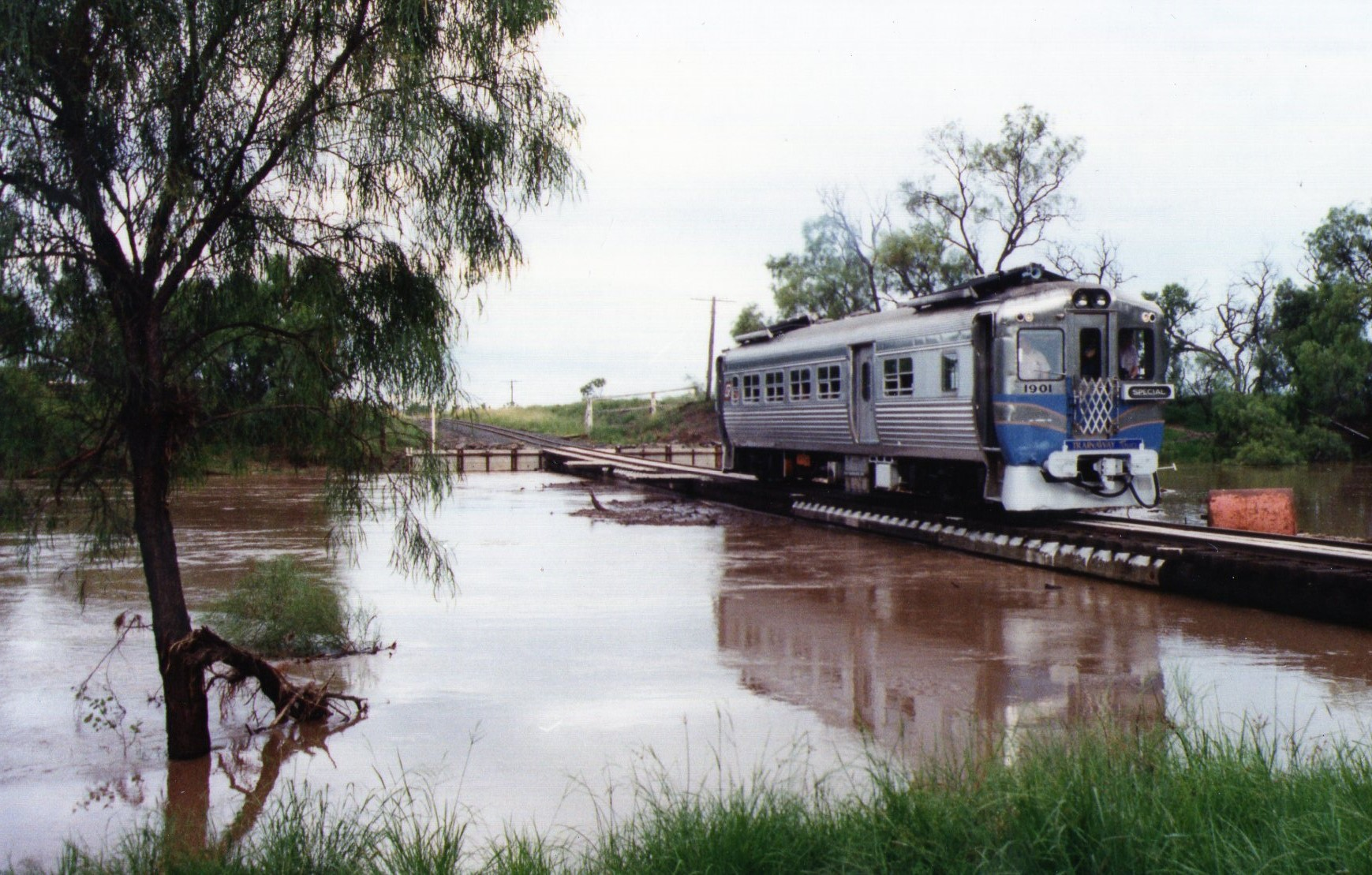
- RM 1901 crosses a swollen Condamine River on the Glenmorgan line south of Dalby, ~1991

Overview
- Status: Operational to Meandarra for grain traffic, closed further than that point.
- Termini: Dalby; Glenmorgan
- Stations: 20 (all closed except for Dalby)

Service
- Operator(s): Queensland Rail Aurizon Watco Australia

History
- Opened: 8 September 1911 (Dalby to Kumbarilla), 4 October 1911 (Kumbarilla to Tara), 24 August 1925 (Tara to The Gums), c. late 1920s to 1931 (The Gums to Glenmorgan)
- Closed: 26 June 2013 (Meandarra to Glenmorgan).

Technical
- Track gauge: 1,067 mm (3 ft 6 in)

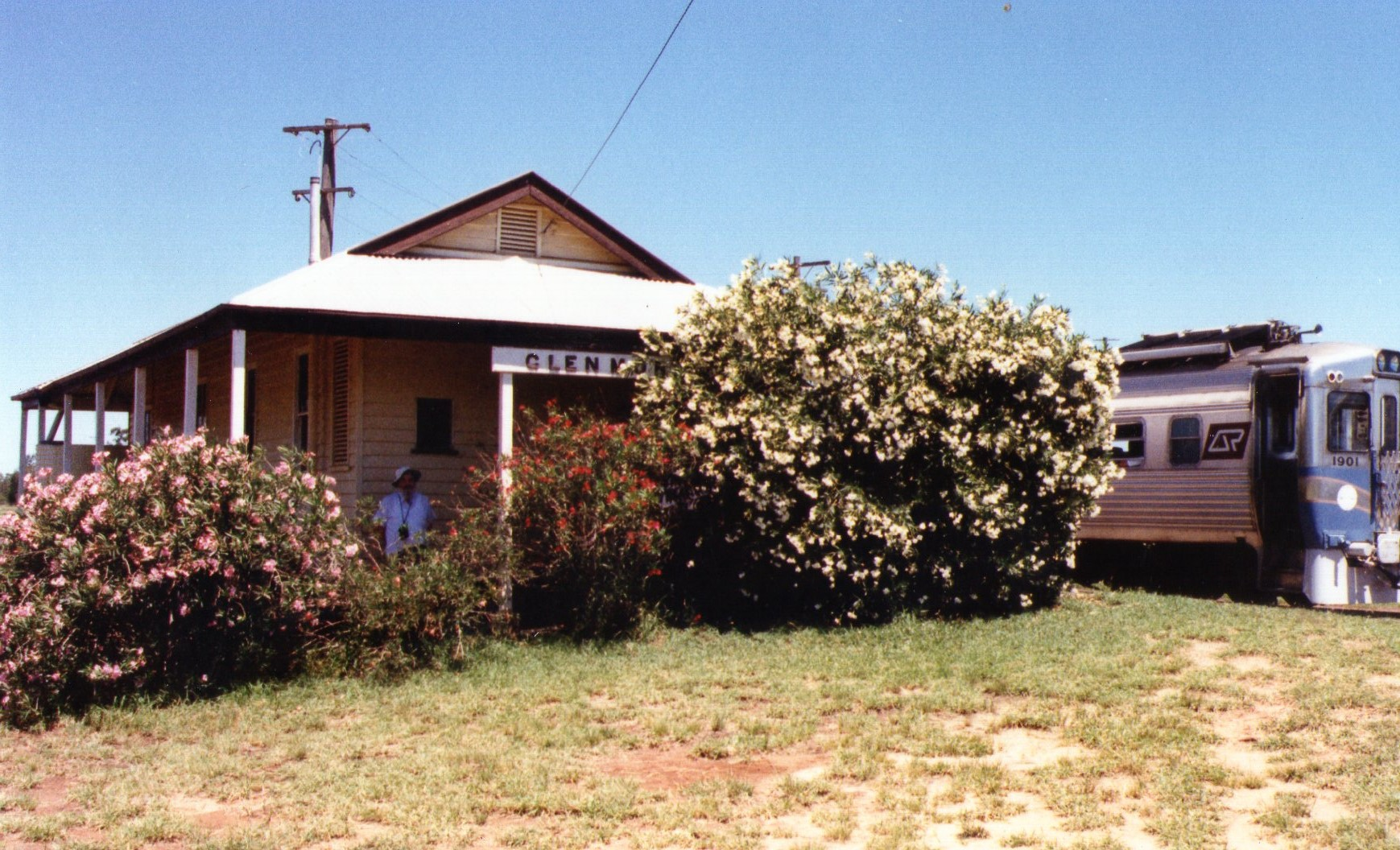
RM 1901 at Glenmorgan Station, ~1991

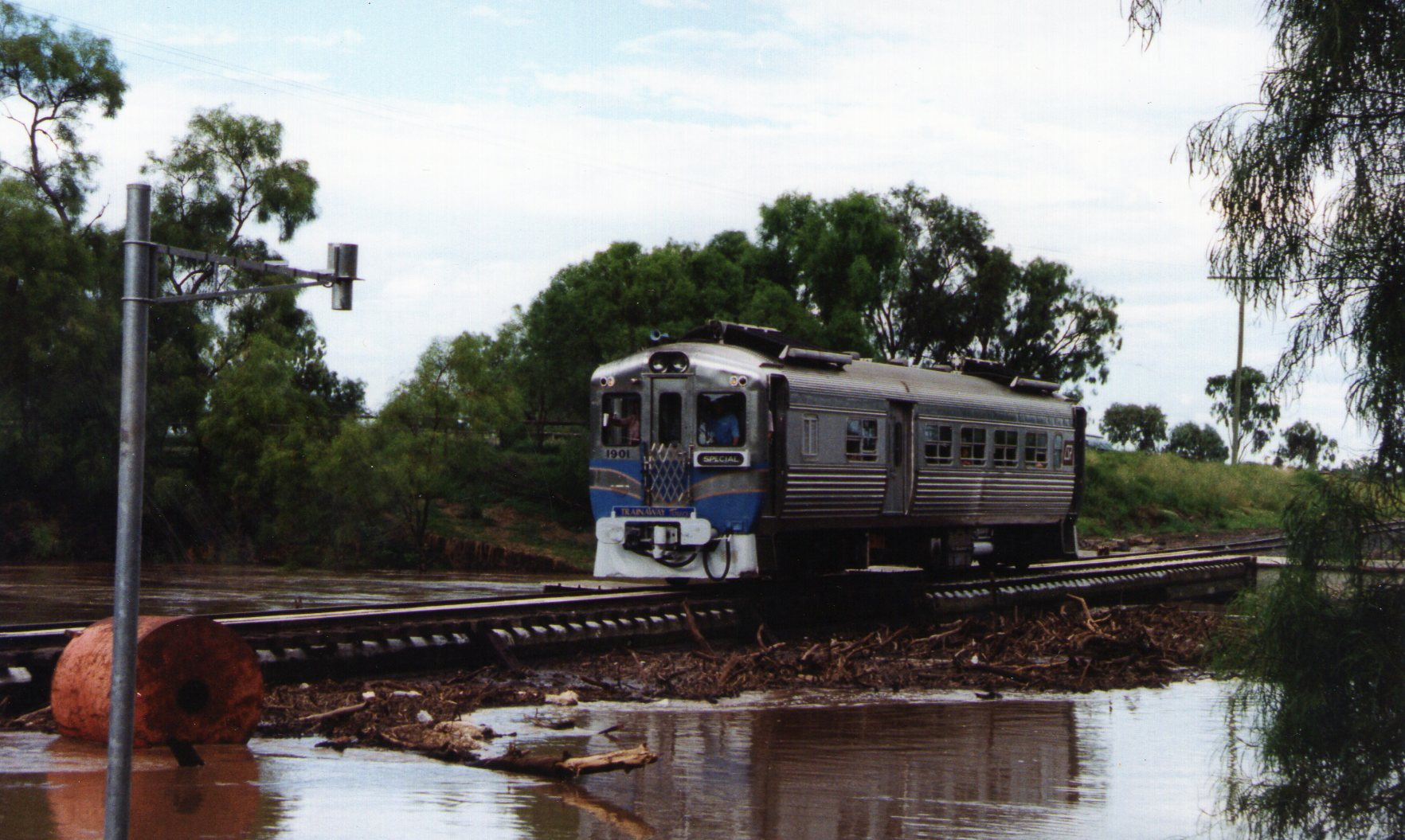
Crossing the Condamine River on the return journey. Note the flood debris accumulated against the bridge

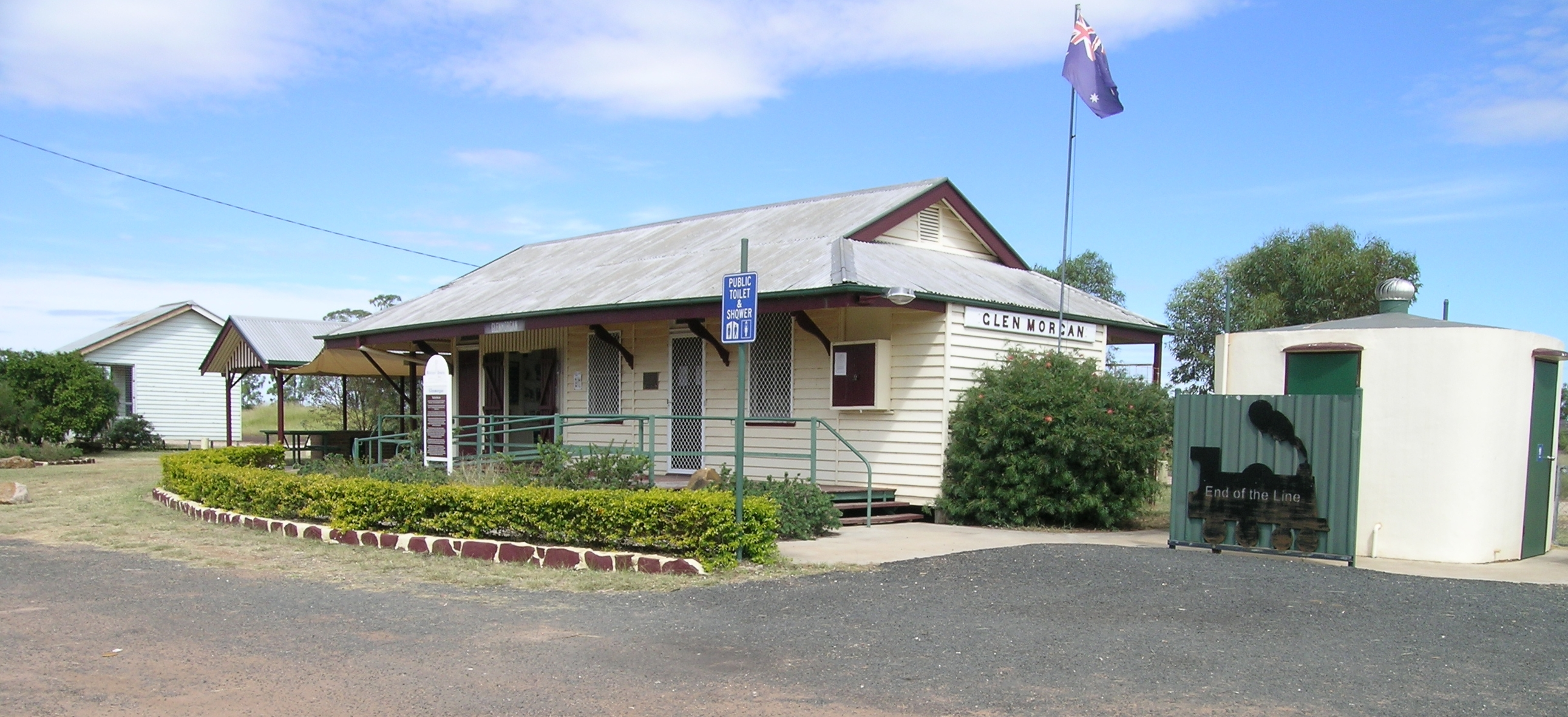
The end of the line railway station at Glenmorgan, which is now a museum.

The Glenmorgan Branch is a railway line in south west Queensland, Australia. It opened in a series of sections between 1908 and 1931. It was intended to reach Surat but construction ceased during the 1930s depression and never recommenced.

== History ==
After the Western Line from Brisbane opened beyond Dalby in the 1870s and the South Western Line passed beyond Warwick in the early 1900s, there was agitation for a service west from Dalby towards Tara. An 84-kilometre (52 mi) extension between the two towns was approved by parliament in April 1908. There was some delay in construction as completion of the Haden and Cooyar branch lines was given priority.

The first section of the line opened as far as Kumbarilla on 8 September 1911 including stops at:

- Dalby (27.1800°S 151.2717°E)
- Natcha (approx 27.1790°S 151.2519°E) serving the Dalby Butter Factory
- Yumborra (27.1839°S 151.2336°E) added in 1956
- Nandi (27.2139°S 151.1714°E)
- Kupunn (27.2267°S 151.1142°E)
- Duleen (27.2403°S 151.0542°E)
- Ducklo (27.2531°S 151.0114°E)
- Gulera (27.2944°S 150.941°E)
- Kumbarilla (27.3150°S 150.8761°E)

On 4 October 1911, the line opened to Tara, including stops at:

- Weranga (27.3044°S 150.7281°E)
- Bungybah (27.2853°S 150.6609°E)
- Goranba (27.2869°S 150.6003°E)
- Perthton (27.2885°S 150.5612°E)
- Tara (27.2775°S 150.4567°E)

A mixed train left Dalby three days a week at noon for the 4¼ hour journey to Tara leaving again the next morning at 11.30am for the return trip.

=== Slow progress west ===
An 80-kilometre extension to Surat was approved by parliament in December 1914 to service dairy and sheep farms en route. The line never reached Surat but four short stages opened progressively as far as Glenmorgan over the ensuing 17 years. Construction began but was suspended between 1916 and 1923. On 24 August 1925, the line was extended to The Gums with stops at:

- Tullagrie (27.2803°S 150.3858°E)
- South Glen (27.3053°S 150.3167°E)
- Cabawin (27.3294°S 150.2503°E)
- The Gums (27.3286°S 150.1853°E)

Two of the three weekly trains travelled the extra distance. Two short stages were opened to:

- Hannaford (27.3264°S 150.0650°E) on 28 June 1926
- Meandarra (27.3219°S 149.8861°E) on 2 July 1927

From 1928, a rail motor service ran twice a week to Tara and later to Meandarra.

Another short extension took the line a further 22 kilometres with stops at:

- an unnamed stop (27.2772°S 149.7564°E)
- Glenmorgan (27.2494°S 149.6769°E) opened on 12 December 1931.

The terminus was renamed Glenmorgan in honour of Godfrey Morgan the Railways Minister between 1929 and 1932. Streets in the town were named after his family and he was also honoured with the naming of Morganville a railway terminus south-west of Bundaberg.

A twice-weekly goods train and a similar rail motor service operated between Dalby and Glenmorgan. Grain gradually accounted for much of the traffic and special grain services became commonplace. Road transport took over transport of general goods to the point where only seasonal grain traffic remains and then only as far as Meandarra.

The line beyond Meandarra was closed to block trains on 26 June 2013 and remains "booked out of use" by both Aurizon and Watco Australia as of 2025.

== Contemporary line standards ==
The maximum grade is 1 in 44 (~2.3%) and the minimum curve is 400m radius. The line currently is laid with 41 & 30 kg/m rail, 25% steel sleepers and a 15.75 tonne axle load, except for west of Meandarra, which was 21 kg/m with a 10 tonne axle load.

The line speed is 60 km/h to Tara, 40 km/h to Meandarra and was 30 km/h to Glenmorgan.

== See also ==
- Rail transport in Queensland
