= Marmadua, Queensland =

Marmadua
- Suburb
- Interactive map of Marmadua
- Coordinates: 27.4663°S 150.6847°E
- Country: Australia
- State: Queensland
- LGA: Western Downs Region
- Location: 36.8 km (22.9 mi) E of Tara; 62.5 km (38.8 mi) NE of Moonie; 66.5 km (41.3 mi) WSW of Dalby; 149 km (93 mi) W of Toowoomba; 276 km (171 mi) W of Brisbane

Government
  - State electorate: Warrego
  - Federal division: Maranoa

Area
  - Total: 597.4 km^{2} (230.7 sq mi)

Population
  - Total: 15 (2021 census)
  - Density: 0.0251/km^{2} (0.0650/sq mi)
- Time zone: UTC+10:00 (AEST)
- Postcode: 4405
Suburbs around Marmadua
Goranba	Weranga	Kumbarilla
Tara	Marmadua	Halliford
Moonie	Weir River	Cattle Creek

Marmadua is a rural locality in the Western Downs Region, Queensland, Australia. In the 2021 census, Marmadua had a population of 15 people.

== Geography ==
The Western railway line enters the locality from the north-east (Kumbarilla), forms the northern boundary of the locality, and then exits to the north (Weranga), but no railway stations serve the locality.

The Moonie Highway enters the locality from the north-west (Kumbarilla / Halliford), briefly forms part of the north-western boundary of the locality before exiting to the south-west (Weir River). As the highway enters the locality, the Surat Developmental Road splits from it and passes through the north of Mamadua before exiting to the north (Weranga).

The east, south and part of the west of Marmadua are within the Kumbarilla State Forest which extends into a number of neighbouring localities.

Apart from these protected areas, the land is a mixture of crop growing and grazing on native vegetation.

== History ==
The locality name is the name of a pastoral station in the 1880s. In the 1870s, it was an outstation of the Weranga Station.

By 1914, Marmadua pastoral station consisted of 205.5 square miles (532 km^{2}) and was carrying approx 3500 cattle. In 1936, an artesian bore was sunk to a depth of 170 feet (52 m) to provide more water for the cattle.

== Demographics ==
In the 2016 census, Marmadua had a population of 9 people.

In the 2021 census, Marmadua had a population of 15 people.

== Education ==
There are no schools is Marmadua. The nearest government primary schools are Moonie State School in neighbouring Moonie to the south-west and Tara Shire State College in neighbouring Tara to the west. The nearest government secondary school is Tara Shire State College (to Year 12).
