= Darling Downs Solar Farm =

Solar power station in Queensland, Australia

- Country: Australia
- Location: 45km west of Dalby, Queensland
- Coordinates: 27.1120°S 150.8819°E
- Status: Operational
- Commission date: May 2018
- Construction cost: A$175 million
- Owner: APA Group

Solar farm
- Type: Flat-panel PV
- Collectors: 430,000
- Site area: 200 hectares (490 acres)

Power generation
- Nameplate capacity: 110 MW

Darling Downs Solar Farm is a 110MW photovoltaic solar power station in Queensland, Australia, developed by APA Group. It is located45 km west of Dalby in the Darling Downs region, next to the Darling Downs Power Station. All the power it produces will be sold to Origin Energy under a power purchase agreement until 2030. The solar farm connects to the national electricity grid through Powerlink's Braemar substation. It has approximately 430,000 solar panels spanning an area of around 250 hectares (620 acres).

The project was originally planned by Origin Energy, which owns the adjacent natural gas-fired Darling Downs Power Station. Origin Energy secured planning approval and received A$20 million support from the Australian Renewable Energy Agency (ARENA) before selling the project to APA Group in May 2017. The solar farm was designed and built by RCR Tomlinson under an engineering, procurement and construction (EPC) contract worth approximately A$175 million.

Darling Downs Solar Farm was the ninth solar farm approved by the Western Downs Regional Council.
