= Montrose, Queensland (Western Downs Region) =

Montrose
- Suburb
- Interactive map of Montrose
- Coordinates: 27.0038°S 150.6172°E
- Country: Australia
- State: Queensland
- LGA: Western Downs Region
- Location: 38.9 km (24.2 mi) NE of Tara; 43.1 km (26.8 mi) S of Chinchilla; 74.4 km (46.2 mi) WNW of Dalby; 157 km (98 mi) NW of Toowoomba; 285 km (177 mi) WNW of Brisbane

Government
  - State electorate: Warrego
  - Federal division: Maranoa

Area
  - Total: 169.4 km^{2} (65.4 sq mi)

Population
  - Total: 49 (2021 census)
  - Density: 0.2893/km^{2} (0.749/sq mi)
- Time zone: UTC+10:00 (AEST)
- Postcode: 4413
Suburbs around Montrose
Crossroads	Hopeland	Hopeland
Wieambilla	Montrose	Kogan
Tara	Kogan	Kogan

Montrose is a rural locality in the Western Downs Region, Queensland, Australia. In the 2021 census, Montrose had a population of 49 people.

== Geography ==
The Kogan Condamine Road forms the north-east boundary of the locality.

The land use above ground is predominantly grazing on native vegetation. Below ground, coal seam gas is extracted through a number of mining leases.

== History ==
The locality takes its name from the parish and the pastoral run name, which pastoralist St George Richard Gore named on 5 May 1866 after the town of Montrose in Forfarshire, Scotland.

Malara Provisional School and Montrose Provisional School both opened circa 1911 as half-time provisional schools (meaning they shared a single teacher between them). In 1919, both schools closed due to low student numbers. Montrose Provisional School was on the northern side of Millbank Road (approx 27.05517°S 150.65012°E).

Between January and March 2023, a number of bushfires burnt thousands of hectares of land, impacting the communities of Tara, Fairyland, Myall Park, and Montrose.

== Demographics ==
In the 2016 census, Montrose had a population of 65 people.

In the 2021 census, Montrose had a population of 49 people.

== Education ==
There are no schools in Montrose. The nearest government primary schools are Kogan State School in neighbouring Kogan to the east and Tara Shire State College in neighbouring Tara to the south-west. The nearest government secondary schools are Tara Shire State College and Chinchilla State High School in Chinchilla to the north. There are also non-government schools in Chinchilla.
