= Darling Downs Power Station =

- Country: Australia
- Location: Kogan, Queensland
- Coordinates: 27°06′39.47″S 150°54′18.78″E
- Status: Opened
- Construction began: August 2007
- Commission date: July 2010
- Construction cost: $780 million
- Owner: Origin Energy

Thermal power station
- Primary fuel: Coal seam gas
- Combined cycle?: Yes

Power generation
- Units operational: 4
- Nameplate capacity: 630 MW

Darling Downs Power Station is in Kogan, Western Downs Region, Queensland, Australia. It is 40 kilometres (25 mi) west of Dalby and owned by Origin Energy. The Darling Downs Power Station is adjacent to the QLD-NSW high voltage transmission Interconnector and the Powerlink Queensland R2 Braemar 330/275 kV Substation.

Darling Downs is a gas fired combined cycle gas turbine power station and is the largest of its type in Australia. It is powered by three 120 MW GE Frame 9E gas turbines and one 270 MW steam turbine, which generate a total of 630 MW of electricity. A 205 kilometre pipeline transports the gas to the station from gas fields near Wallumbilla. The power station uses less than 3% of the water that a traditional coal powered power station does by utilising air-cooled technology.

Origin Energy developed the power station and the construction costs for the project were $780 million. Darling Downs entered commercial operation in July 2010. and was officially opened on the 5 November 2010 by Premier Anna Bligh.

== See also ==
- List of power stations in Queensland
