= QGC =

Australian natural gas company

Shell's QGC
- Formerly: QGC Pty. Ltd.
- Type: Subsidiary
- Industry: Energy
- Headquarters: Brisbane, Australia
- Area served: Worldwide
- Key people: Kim Code, SVP East
- Products: Natural gas
- Parent: Shell Australia
- Website: shell.com.au/qgc

Shell's QGC (formerly, QGC Pty. Ltd.) (initials for "Queensland Gas Company") is one of the largest of several Australian coalbed methane companies developing methane reserves within the Bowen and Surat Basins of Queensland. The company has an estimated value of around A$13 billion.

BG Group acquired Queensland Gas Company in November 2008. QGC was included in the February 2016 acquisition of BG Group by Shell.

== Operations ==
Coal seam gas extraction within the Surat and Bowen Basins of Queensland, Australia forms the basis of the company's main operations. QGC has constructed a coalbed methane liquefaction plant on Curtis Island off the coast of Gladstone in Central Queensland. The company has built a 540-kilometre (340 mi), 42-inch (1,070 mm) diameter pipeline from Miles to Gladstone, making it the longest buried pipeline of its type in Australia. Work was delayed after QGC was found to have contravened state environmental laws.

About 20% of Queensland's natural gas was produced by QGC in 2009.

The company has a gas plant called Kenya, which is located near Tara, Queensland. Three coal seam gas fields Lauren, Codie, and Kate are associated with the Kenya plant. Leakage testing conducted in April and May 2010 found more than half of the wells in these gas fields were leaking extremely low level concentrations of methane.

== Environmental protests ==
In 2011, Bob Irwin the Australian environmentalist and founder of Australia Zoo, was arrested after protesting against QGC and refusing to obey an order from police to move on. This was part of a long running protest by Tara protestors to disrupt the gas infrastructure being forced on them without their consent.

ABC's Four Corners current affairs program produced several investigative reports on what has been described as the great Australian land grab and the environmental dangers of coal seam gas.
