= Kogan, Queensland =

Kogan
- Town
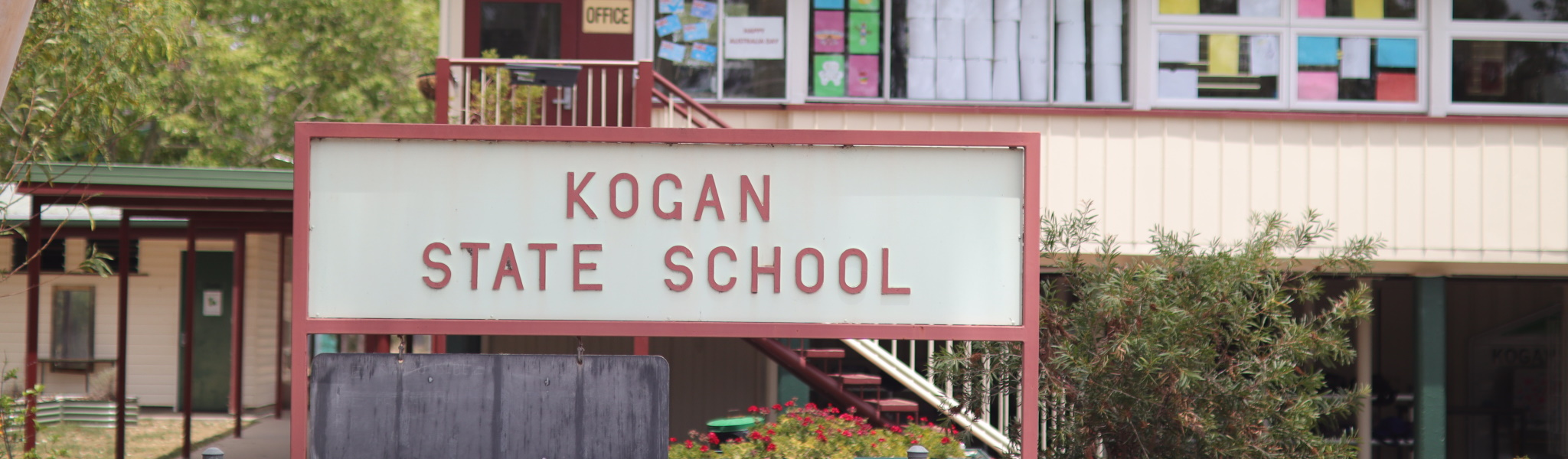
- Kogan State School, 2024

- Interactive map of Kogan
- Coordinates: 27.0372°S 150.7577°E
- Country: Australia
- State: Queensland
- LGA: Western Downs Region
- Location: 44.5 km (27.7 mi) WNW of Dalby; 126 km (78 mi) NW of Toowoomba; 252 km (157 mi) WNW of Brisbane

Government
  - State electorate: Warrego
  - Federal division: Maranoa

Area
  - Total: 624.2 km^{2} (241.0 sq mi)

Population
  - Total: 211 (2021 census)
  - Density: 0.3380/km^{2} (0.8755/sq mi)
- Time zone: UTC+10:00 (AEST)
- Postcode: 4406
Localities around Kogan
Hopeland; Montrose	Brigalow	Warra
Tara	Kogan	Macalister; Ranges Bridge
Goranga; Weranga	Beelbee	Ducklo; Kumbarilla

Kogan is a rural town and locality in the Western Downs Region, Queensland, Australia. In the 2021 census, the locality of Kogan had a population of 211 people.

== Geography ==
The locality of Kogan is shaped like an upside-down U with the locality of Beelbee almost enclosed by Kogan. The town of Kogan is in the north-west of the locality. From the town there are four arterial roads:

- Kogan Condamine Road towards the north-west to Montrose and eventually to Condamine
- Warra Kogan Road towards the north-east to Warra
- Dalby Kogan Road towards the south-east to Macalister and eventually to Dalby
- Tara Kogan Road towards the south-west to Tara

In the north-east of the locality, the Condamine River flows from south to north along Kogan's boundary with Warra, while Wilkie Creek flowing from south to north (a tributary of the Condamine) forms Kogan's boundary with Macalister. Wambo Creek flows from south to north-west through the south-western part of the locality and is eventually a tributary of the Condamine River.

Kogan Creek flows from south to north through the locality passing through the township of Kogan; it is also a tributary of the Condamine River.

The lower flatter land in Kogan (approx 350 metres above sea level) is used for grazing, while higher peaks of approx 400metres remain as bushland. Most of Kogan is freehold land with the exceptions of Dalby State Forest (27.0516°S 150.8908°E), Braemer State Forest (27.1564°S 150.9285°E), both in the eastern part of the locality.

Geologically, Kogan is part of the Surat Basin.

The predominant land use is grazing on native vegetation.

== History ==
The name Kogan derives from an early pastoral run called Kogan Creek owned variously by J.E. Barney (-1848), Joseph King (1838-1849), and Colin J. McKenzie (1849-). The name probably comes from Kogai, one of the Aboriginal tribes from the district.

It was a changing station on the Dalby-Roma coach route prior to the construction of the Western railway line. It had a hotel, the Kogan Inn, at that time, but this closed after the demise of the coach route.

Kogan Provisional School opened on 4 October 1897 and closed about 1899. It reopened in 1905 and became Kogan State School in 1910.

Perth Provisional School opened circa November 1910. In 1922 it became a half-time school (meaning a single teacher shared between two schools) with Brooklyn Provisional School, which opened circa October 1922. Circa November 1925 the Brooklyn school closed and Perth school returned to full-time status, only to close circa November 1926. The location of these schools were described as "via Kogan".

Kogan North State School opened on 18 June 1936 and closed on 30 April 1944. The school's location was described "via Kogan".

Millbank State School opened on 24 January 1938 and closed on 28 January 1957. The school's location was described "via Kogan".

The Wilkie Creek coal mine commenced operation in 1994. It was bought by Peabody Energy in 2002.

== Demographics ==
In the 2011 census, the locality of Kogan had a population of 355 people.

In the 2016 census, the locality of Kogan had a population of 190 people.

In the 2021 census, the locality of Kogan had a population of 211 people.

== Economy ==
All of Kogan and Beelbee are subject to petroleum leases and there are many coal seam gas wells in south-east Kogan with associated pipelines.

The Wilkie Creek coal mine is located on the eastern boundary of the locality (27.0482°S 150.9569°E). It is an open cut mine producing a thermal coal that is low in nitrogen and sulphur. The coal is then taken by rail to the Port of Brisbane from where it is taken by ship to Asia where it is used in power generation.

There are a number of electricity generators in Kogan:

- gas-powered Darling Downs Power Station (27.1172°S 150.8949°E)
- gas-powered Braemer Power Station with
  - Braemar 1 Power Station (27.1101°S 150.9046°E)
  - Braemar 2 Power Station (27.1129°S 150.9056°E)
- gas-powered Daandine Power Station (27.0862°S 150.9426°E)
- Darling Downs Solar Farm (27.1141°S 150.8803°E)

There are a number of homesteads in the locality, including:

- Bothwell Park (26.9863°S 150.7590°E)
- Brooklyn (27.0787°S 150.7427°E)
- Coolwater (27.1025°S 150.5832°E)
- Eden Vale (26.9863°S 150.7490°E)
- Emoh Ruo (27.0074°S 150.7544°E)
- Falconhurst (27.0592°S 150.7829°E)
- Glencoe (27.0623°S 150.7440°E)
- Greenpatch (27.0415°S 150.7589°E)
- Honeyvale (27.0842°S 150.8950°E)
- Iona (27.0652°S 150.6854°E)
- Kainama (27.0260°S 150.7646°E)
- Kaiyuta (27.1066°S 150.5839°E)
- Pingelly (27.0906°S 150.8700°E)
- Smitham (27.1051°S 150.5808°E)
- Topwater (27.1291°S 150.5764°E)
- Wecunna (27.0704°S 150.8656°E)
- Wonga Lea (27.1041°S 150.9753°E)

== Education ==
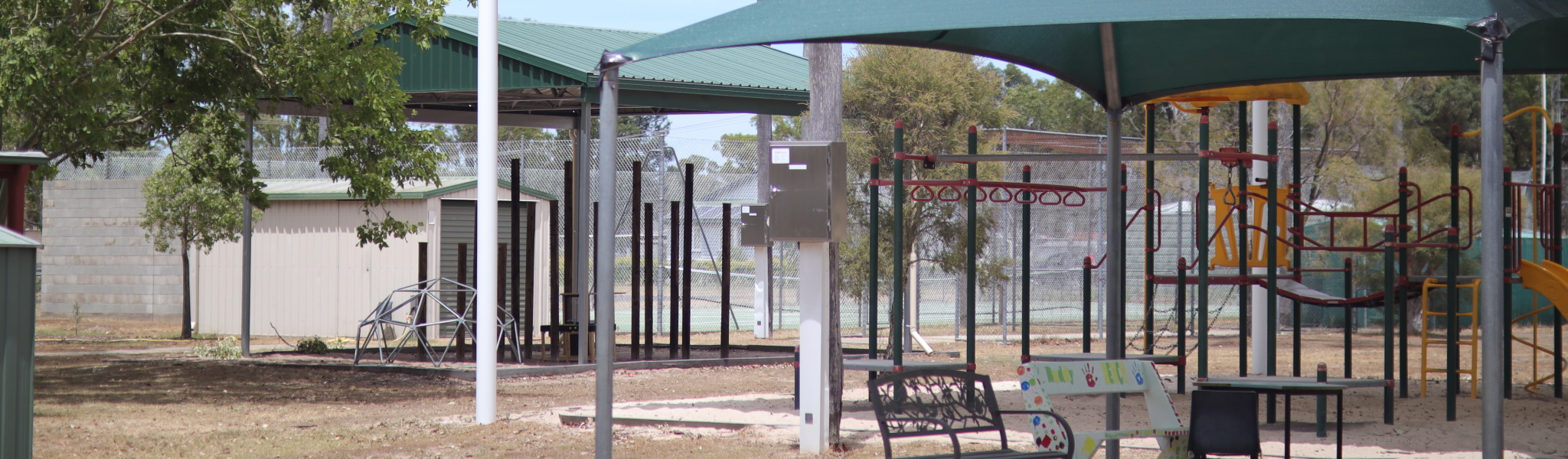
Kogan State School playground, 2024

Kogan State School is a government primary (Prep–6) school for boys and girls on the south side of High Street (27.0382°S 150.7578°E). In 2015, there were 47 students enrolled with 3 teachers (2 full-time equivalent). In 2018, the school had an enrolment of 24 students with 2 teachers and 5 non-teaching staff (2 full-time equivalent).

There are no secondary schools in Kogan. The nearest government secondary schools are Chinchilla State High School (to Year 12) in Chinchilla to the north-west, Jandowae State School (to Year 10) in Jandowae to the north-east, Dalby State High School (to Year 12) in Dalby to the east, and Tara Shire State College (to Year 12) in neighbouring Tara to the south-west.

== Facilities ==
Kogan District Rural Fire Brigade is on the eastern corner of High Street and Henry Street (27.0370°S 150.7569°E).

== Hugh Sawrey ==
Australian painter Hugh Sawrey spent many years in the Kogan area. He often painted murals on local buildings to pay his bills. He first visited the town after he returned from military service in World War II, seeking work on cattle stations. He painted murals for the lounge of the Kogan Hotel and the ceiling of the Kogan post office.

In 2009, a documentary was made about Sawrey titled Banjo Paterson with a Paintbrush. On 3 October 2009, the documentary premiered at the Art at Kogan festival in the presence of the Queensland Governor, Penelope Wensley.

Sawrey is commemorated in Kogan with a sculpture and walkway. The sculpture titled Bush Friendship is on the Kogan-Condamine Road (27.0404°S 150.7614°E) and features Sawrey with his friend Nelson "Darkie" Dwyer, the former publican in Kogan. It is a lifesize sculpture in bronze and depicts the two men sitting across a table from one another, playing cards (as they often did). The sculpture forms part of the Hugh Sawrey Walk of Fame, which was funded by the Queensland Government as part of the Q150 celebrations. A sculpture of a horse with a rugged stockman on his back and the whip cutting up above his head (themes that Sawrey often painted) forms the entrance to the Kogan Community Centre.
