= Tara, Queensland =

Tara
- Town
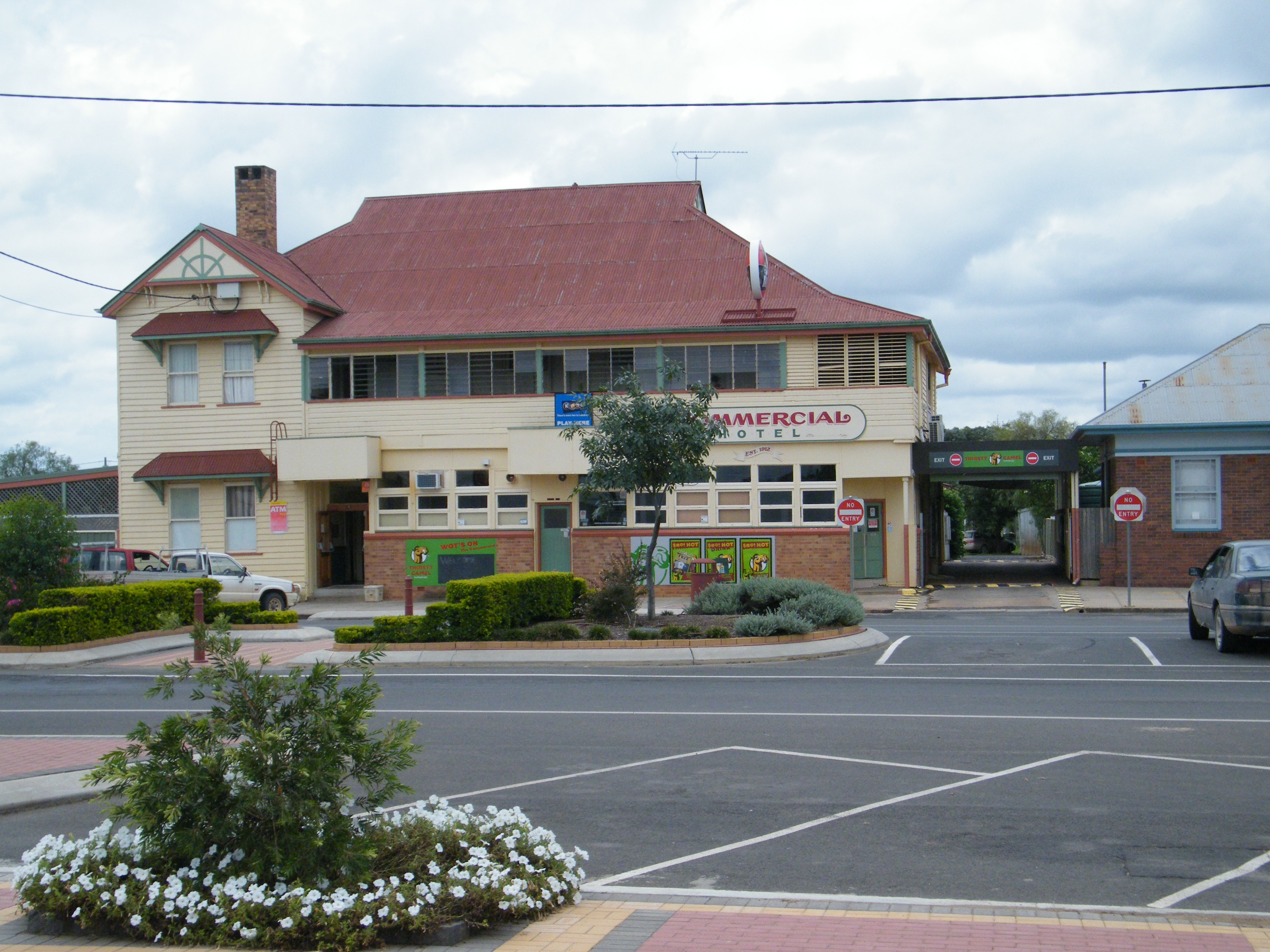
- Commercial Hotel

- Interactive map of Tara
- Coordinates: 27.2766°S 150.4572°E
- Country: Australia
- State: Queensland
- LGA: Western Downs Region
- Location: 89.3 km (55.5 mi) W of Dalby; 186 km (116 mi) WNW of Toowoomba; 299 km (186 mi) W of Brisbane

Government
  - State electorate: Warrego
  - Federal division: Maranoa

Area
  - Total: 1,292.6 km^{2} (499.1 sq mi)

Population
  - Total: 1,980 (2021 census)
  - Density: 1.532/km^{2} (3.967/sq mi)
- Time zone: UTC+10:00 (AEST)
- Postcode: 4421
Localities around Tara
The Gums	Wieambilla	Montrose; Kogan
The Gums	Tara	Goranba
The Gums	Moonie	Marmadua

Tara is a rural town and locality in the Western Downs Region, Queensland, Australia. In the 2021 census, the locality of Tara had a population of 1,980 people.

== Geography ==
Tara is on the Darling Downs. The town is at the centre of the locality. Immediately surrounding the urban area of Tara, there are a number of rural subdivisions of 'lifestyle blocks'. The blocks are usually between 13 and 40 ha in area. The population of the 2000 Rural Subdivision blocks exceeds that of the town itself.

The Glenmorgan railway line traverses the locality from east (Goranba) to west (The Gums). There are two railway stations within the locality:

- Tara railway station, serving the town (27.2775°S 150.4566°E)
- Tullagrie railway station, to the south-west of the town but now abandoned (27.2802°S 150.3858°E)

== History ==
Baranggum people were and are the aboriginal people settled in the area of the town of Tara.

The town was surveyed in May 1910 by Leonard Shield, and named Tara after the local pastoral run of the same name gazetted on 25 March 1852. It is assumed that this is a reference to the Hill of Tara in County Meath, Ireland.

Tara Provisional School opened on 23 January 1911 but was renamed the Laurndel Provisional School in 1912. It was subsequently renamed the Burrowes Provisional School in 1915, renamed the Burrowes State School in 1923, and closed in 1946. The school was located south-west of Tara just north of the Glenmorgan railway line at 27.2914°S 150.3515°E.

Tara State School opened on 21 August 1912. On 28 November 2004, it was renamed the Tara Shire State College,and celebrated its centenary in 2012.

In March 1943, the community requested that the school building, from the closed Goranba State School, be relocated to the Warra-Kogan Road near the Myra Meadows property, a site donated by Andrew Watt Adams. This request was approved in October 1943, and the subsequently relocated school building was opened as Myra State School in 1944 but closed on 2 February 1945. Its location was a 10-acre (4.0 ha) site on the eastern side of the Tara Kogan Road (27.22472°S 150.52411°E).

In 1914, a Methodist Church was built in Tara.

St Joseph's Catholic Primary School was established in 1965 by the Sisters of St Joseph of the Sacred Heart. From 1978, the school has had a lay principal.

Tara Library opened in 1987 and had a major refurbishment in 2009.

On 14 March 2011 a blockade against coal seam gas development began at a property called "Kenya" near Tara. The following day, a woman was arrested after she stopped the movement of a bulldozer working for the Queensland Gas Company. The next month Bob Irwin was arrested and fined for participating in a rally at the same location. He was protesting against plans to build a coal seam gas pipeline. Local landowner Dayne Pratzky, now an anti-coal seam gas activist, features in the 2015 movie-length documentary Frackman.

On 12 December 2022, Constables Matthew Arnold and Rachel McCrow were murdered at the nearby locality of Wieambilla. The two constables were based at Tara Police Station (27.2746°S 150.4585°E) at the time of the incident.

Between January and March 2023, a number of bushfires burnt thousands of hectares of land, impacting the communities of Tara, Fairyland, Myall Park, and Montrose.

In October 2023, more than 53 homes in the Tara region were destroyed by bushfires.

== Demographics ==
In the 2016 census, the locality of Tara had a population of 2,297 people.

In the 2021 census, the locality of Tara had a population of 1,980 people.

== Economy ==
Important industries in the area around Tara include wheat, beef, wool and gas.

== Education ==
St Joseph's School is a Catholic primary (Preparatory to Year 6) school for boys and girls at 3 Fry Street (27.2751°S 150.4602°E). In 2017, the school had an enrolment of 26 students with 5 teachers (4 full-time equivalent) and 4 non-teaching staff (2 full-time equivalent). In 2018, the school had an enrolment of 23 students with 5 teachers (4 full-time equivalent) and 4 non-teaching staff (2 full-time equivalent).

Tara Shire State College is a government primary and secondary (Early Childhood to Year 12) school for boys and girls at 22 Binnie Street (27.2799°S 150.4588°E). In 2017, the school had an enrolment of 359 students with 37 teachers (36 full-time equivalent) and 30 non-teaching staff (23 full-time equivalent). In 2018, the school had an enrolment of 354 students with 39 teachers (38 full-time equivalent) and 28 non-teaching staff (22 full-time equivalent). The school includes a special education program.

== Amenities ==
Tara has a library at 31 Day Street operated by the Western Downs Regional Council.

== Attractions ==
Attractions near Tara include Southwood National Park, a remnant area of the southern brigalow belt.

The Commercial Hotel has two murals painted by artist Hugh Sawrey, from nearby Kogan. Painted in 1960, they are You’ll come a waltzing Matilda with me and Clancy’s gone to Queensland droving.

== Coal seam gas controversy ==
Following health complaints reported by local people, in 2013, the Queensland Government conducted an inquiry into Coal Seam Gas in the Tara Region and a risk assessment on the health and environmental impacts, concluding that "a clear link can not be drawn between the health complaints by some residents in the Tara region and impacts of the local CSG industry on air, water or soil within the community."

In 2016, the Australian Government conducted a senate inquiry into unconventional mining. The interim report published in May 2016 raised concerns about:

- the lack of rights of landholders to prevent their land being used for CSG extraction, despite it reducing the value of their land or making it impossible to sell at all
- healthcare concerns of residents continuing to be unaddressed at both state and local levels
- the consumption of water by CSG extraction reducing water available for agricultural use and the need for water for CSG extraction to be properly treated before it can be recycled and the lack of remedy for farmers if the water is not properly treated or the contamination of their agricultural products makes them unable to be sold (or a source of legal action against the farmer for subsequent ill-effects further along the supply chain)

In June 2024, the government's response to the interim report was that "given the passage of time since this report was tabled, a substantive Government response to these recommendations is no longer appropriate".

As at 2022, the Lock the Gate Alliance continue to lobby against coal seam gas in the area, and have produced a set of first-hand accounts in short film format called Voices from the Gaslands to highlight the ongoing struggles for the community.

== See also ==
- Energy in Queensland
