= Toowoomba–Cecil Plains Road =

Road in Queensland, Australia

Toowoomba–Cecil Plains Road Queensland

General information
- Type: Rural road
- Length: 78.6 km (49 mi)
- Route number(s): No shield (Newtown - Cecil Plains); State Route 82 (within Cecil Plains)

Major junctions
- East end: Toowoomba Connection Road Newtown
- Gore Highway; Oakey - Pittsworth Road; Pampas–Horrane Road
- West end: Dalby–Cecil Plains Road Cecil Plains

Location(s)
- Major settlements: Wellcamp, Norwin

Toowoomba–Cecil Plains Road is a continuous 78.6 kilometres (48.8 mi) road route in the Toowoomba region of Queensland, Australia. Most of the road is not signed with any route number, but a short section near Cecil Plains is part of State Route 82. Toowoomba–Cecil Plains Road (number 324) is a state-controlled district road, part of which is rated as a local road of regional significance (LRRS).

== Route Description ==
The Toowoomba–Cecil Plains Road commences as Taylor Street at an intersection with the Toowoomba Connection Road in Newtown, a suburb of Toowoomba. It runs west, becoming Carrington Road and turning north-west as it enters Torrington. It turns south and then west as it enters Wellcamp as Toowoomba–Cecil Plains Road. It passes under the Gore Highway (Toowoomba Bypass), runs past the Toowoomba Wellcamp Airport, and enters Biddeston. From here the road passes through open crop-farming land for the rest of its length.

From Biddeston it runs between Aubigny and Linthorpe, crosses the Oakey–Pittsworth Road, and then passes between Purrawunda and Motley. Next it passes between Mount Irving and Mount Tyson before running through Evanslea and Bongeen. After entering Norwin the road turns south at an intersection with Bowenville–Norwin Road. It continues for a short distance before again turning west at an intersection with Brookstead–Norwin Road. It then passes through Nangwee and enters Cecil Plains. Here it passes Pampas–Horrane Road (Note: Horrane was a station on the former Cecil Plains railway line. It was situated adjacent to the intersection of Toowoomba–Cecil Plains Road and Pampas–Horrane Road in the locality of Cecil Plains.) (State Route 82) where it becomes part of State Route 82 before ending at an intersection with Dalby–Cecil Plains Road (State Route 82).

== State Route 82 ==
State Route 82 follows a number of separately named roads from Tingoora (near Wondai) to Inglewood. It is not necessarily the best or the shortest or the quickest route between the two terminals. It was proclaimed as a State Route because, at the time, it was the most convenient route for many users. It is also an example of why motorists in unfamiliar territory should follow a designated route rather than rely on a vehicle navigation system, which may direct them onto less suitable alternative roads.

The route follows Chinchilla–Wondai Road west from Tingoora to Durong, where it turns south to Jinghi. Here the Chinchilla–Wondai Road turns west, while State Route 82 continues south on Jandowae Connection Road to Jandowae. In Jandowae the road name changes to Dalby–Jandowae Road, which continues to the Warrego Highway in the west of Dalby. From there it follows the Warrego Highway to the south-east until it reaches Dalby–Cecil Plains Road, where it continues south.

At a T-junction in Cecil Plains, State Route 82 turns east on Toowoomba–Cecil Plains Road until it reaches Pampas–Horrane Road, where it turns south. Note that many navigation systems will suggest a turn to the west in Cecil Plains, leading to Millmerran–Cecil Plains Road. State Route 82 follows Pampas–Horrane Road to Pampas, where it meets the Gore Highway at a T-junction. From there it follows the Gore Highway south-west to Millmerran, where it turns south on the Millmerran–Inglewood Road. This road continues south to Inglewood, where it meets the Cunningham Highway at a T-junction.

== Road condition ==
Toowoomba–Cecil Plains Road is fully sealed. It has about 670 metres (730 yd) with an incline greater than 5%.

== History ==
The first roads on the Darling Downs were cut to provide access for wheeled vehicles to the pastoral runs and new settlements. Some of these radiated from Toowoomba like the spokes of a wheel. Between the north-west road (now Warrego Highway) and the south-west road (now Gore Highway) was the western road (now Toowoomba–Cecil Plains Road).

Cecil Plains pastoral run was established in 1842. In 1877 8,300 acres (3,400 ha) was resumed from the Cecil Plains pastoral run to establish smaller farms. This resumption soon led to closer settlement and a demand for better roads to enable the commercial success of the new farms.

A postal receiving office opened in 1890, and the first school in 1898. Over time the areas along the line of road from Cecil Plains to Toowoomba were settled as farms of various sizes. In 1916, Cecil Plains station was acquired by the Queensland Government and subdivided for closer settlement, with some parcels reserved for soldier settlers. The new settlers produced mainly wheat and dairy.

== Upgrades ==
=== Taylor Street cycleway ===
A project to develop a business case for a cycleway on Taylor Street, at a cost of $430,000, was to complete in June 2022.

=== Safety upgrades ===
A project to plan safety upgrades, at a cost of $250,000, was completed in December 2021.

== Intersecting state-controlled roads ==
This road intersects with the following state-controlled roads:

- Oakey–Pittsworth Road
- Bowenville–Norwin Road
- Brookstead–Norwin Road

=== Oakey–Pittsworth Road ===
Oakey–Pittsworth Road
- Location: Oakey Connection Road, Oakey to Gore Highway, Pittsworth
- Length: 38.1 km (23.7 mi)

Oakey–Pittsworth Road is a state-controlled district road (number 323). It runs from Oakey Connection Road in Oakey to the Gore Highway in Pittsworth, a distance of 38.1 kilometres (23.7 mi). It intersects with the Warrego Highway in Oakey and with Toowoomba–Cecil Plains Road in Aubigny.

A project to plan for the upgrade of sections of Oakey–Pittsworth Road was to be completed in September 2021.

=== Bowenville–Norwin Road ===
Bowenville–Norwin Road
- Location: Warrego Highway, Bowenville to Toowoomba–Cecil Plains Road, Norwin
- Length: 26.8 km (16.7 mi)

Bowenville–Norwin Road is a state-controlled district road (number 3203) rated as a local road of regional significance (LRRS). It runs from the Warrego Highway in Bowenville to Toowoomba–Cecil Plains Road in Norwin, a distance of 26.8 kilometres (16.7 mi). This road has no major intersections.

=== Brookstead–Norwin Road ===
Brookstead–Norwin Road
- Location: Gore Highway, Brookstead to Toowoomba–Cecil Plains Road, Norwin
- Length: 29.4 km (18.3 mi)

Brookstead–Norwin Road is a state-controlled district road (number 3221) rated as a local road of regional significance (LRRS). It runs from the Gore Highway in Brookstead to Toowoomba–Cecil Plains Road in Norwin, a distance of 29.4 kilometres (18.3 mi). This road has no major intersections.

== Major intersections ==
All distances are from Google Maps. The entire road is in the Toowoomba local government area.

Location	km	mi	Destinations	Notes
Newtown / Wilsonton midpoint	0	0.0	Toowoomba Connection Road – north – Wilsonton Heights south – Harristown	Eastern end of Toowoomba–Cecil Plains Road (no shield). Road runs west as Taylor Street.
Wilsonton / Torrington / Glenvale tripoint	2.6	1.6	Boundary Street – north – Cotswold Hills – south – Glenvale	Road name changes to Carrington Road
Torrington / Charlton / Wellcamp tripoint	5.9	3.7	Troys Road – north – Toowoomba Connection Road	Road turns south as Toowoomba–Cecil Plains Road
Wellcamp / Torrington / Glenvale tripoint	6.7	4.2	Hursley Road – east – Glenvale	Road turns west
Wellcamp	10.1– 10.3	6.3– 6.4	Gore Highway – northeast – Charlton, Warrego Highway southwest – Athol	
Aubigny / Motley / Linthorpe tripoint	30.9	19.2	Oakey–Pittsworth Road – northeast – Oakey, Warrego Highway southwest – Pittsworth, Gore Highway	
Norwin	55.2	34.3	Bowenville–Norwin Road – north – Bowenville, Warrego Highway	Road turns south
Norwin	60.0	37.3	Brookstead–Norwin Road – south – Branchview, Brookstead	Road turns west
Cecil Plains	74.8	46.5	Pampas–Horrane Road (State Route 82) – southeast – Pampas, Gore Highway; Horrane Road – north – Tipton	Road becomes State Route 82
Cecil Plains	78.6	48.8	Dalby–Cecil Plains Road (State Route 82) – north – Dalby; Taylor Street – west – Cecil Plains CBD	Western end of Toowoomba–Cecil Plains Road (State Route 82).
1.000 mi = 1.609 km; 1.000 km = 0.621 mi: Route transition

== See also ==
- List of road routes in Queensland
- List of numbered roads in Queensland
