= Yargullen =

- Suburb
- Interactive map of Yargullen
- Coordinates: 27.4836°S 151.5986°E
- Country: Australia
- State: Queensland
- LGA: Toowoomba Region
- Location: 18.6 km (11.6 mi) WSW of Oakey; 44.5 km (27.7 mi) WNW of Toowoomba CBD; 174 km (108 mi) W of Brisbane

Government
  - State electorate: Condamine
  - Federal division: Groom

Area
  - Total: 28.6 km^{2} (11.0 sq mi)

Population
  - Total: 27 (2021 census)
  - Density: 0.944/km^{2} (2.45/sq mi)
- Time zone: UTC+10:00 (AEST)
- Postcode: 4401
Suburbs around Yargullen
Jondaryan	Jondaryan	Jondaryan
Evanslea	Yargullen	Aubigny
Mount Irving	Mount Irving	Purrawunda

Yargullen is a rural locality in the Toowoomba Region, Queensland, Australia. In the 2021 census, Yargullen had a population of 27 people.

== Geography ==
The Jondaryan Mount Tyson Road enters the locality from the north (Jondaryan) and exits to the south (Mount Irving).

Woodview is a neighbourhood in the south-east of the locality (27.5°S 151.6166°E).

The land use is a mixture of dry and irrigated crop growing.

== History ==
The locality takes its name from the Yargullen railway station (27.4752°S 151.6723°E) on the former Cecil Plains railway line, which was named by the Queensland Railways Department on 5 August 1915. Yargullen is an Aboriginal word meaning waterhole on plain.

Woodview Provisional School opened on 3 May 1886. It became Woodview State School on 19 January 1891 and closed on 31 December 1974. Unofficially it was known as Happy Valley School. The school was located on the Woodview School Road (approx 27.4979°S 151.6154°E).

== Demographics ==
In the 2016 census, Yargullen had a population of 25 people.

In the 2021 census, Yargullen had a population of 27 people.

== Education ==
There are no schools in Yargullen. The nearest government primary schools are:

- Jondaryan State School in neighbouring Jondaryan to the north
- Oakey State School in Oakey to the north-east
- Biddeston State School in Biddeston to the south-east
- Mount Tyson State School in Mount Tyson to the south

The nearest government secondary school is Oakey State High School in Oakey.

There is also a Catholic primary school in Oakey.
