= Motley, Queensland =

Motley
- Suburb
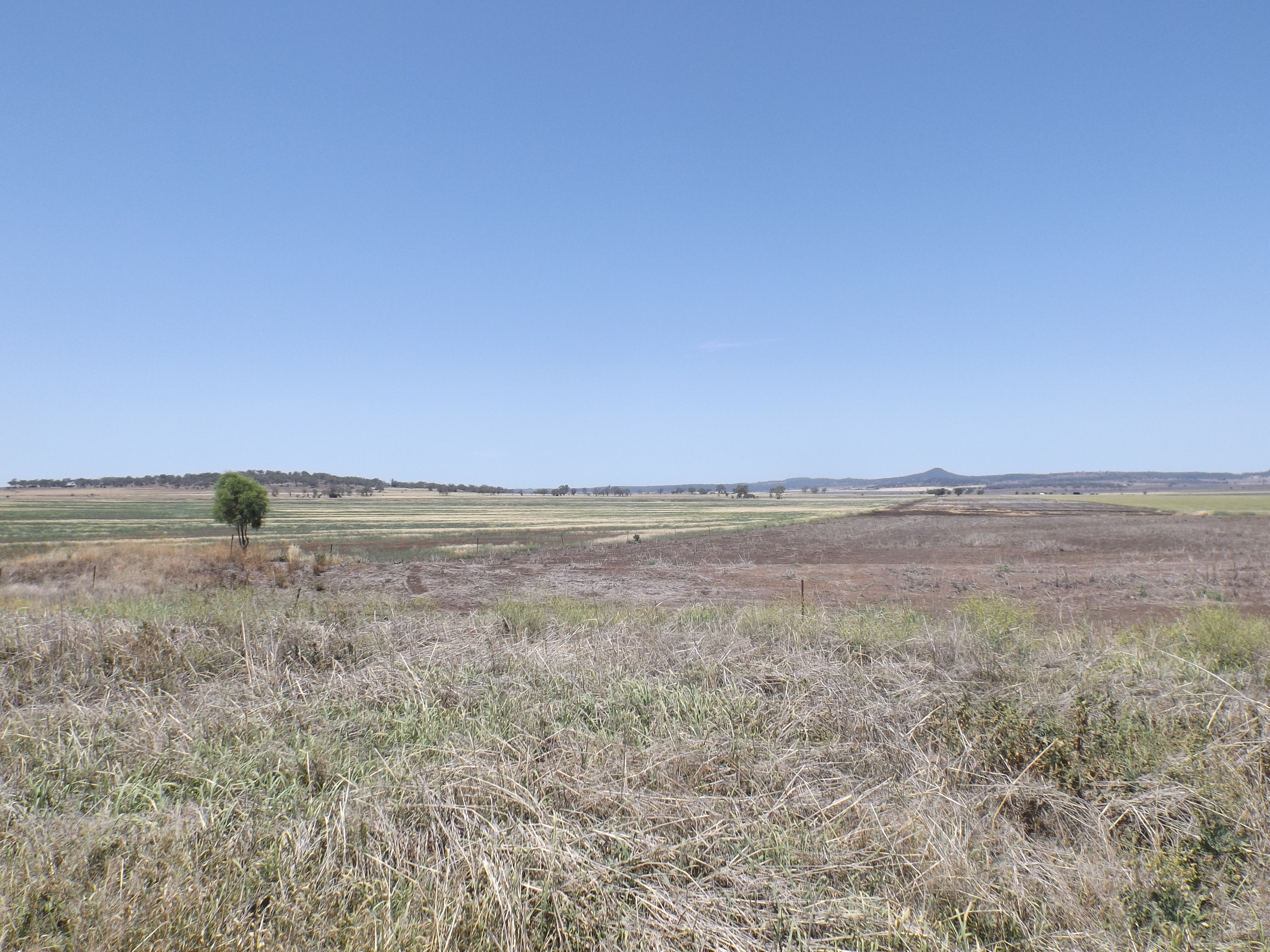
- Fields along Toowoomba Cecil Plains Road, 2014

- Interactive map of Motley
- Coordinates: 27.5436°S 151.6144°E
- Country: Australia
- State: Queensland
- LGA: Toowoomba Region
- Location: 18.4 km (11.4 mi) SW of Oakey; 35.2 km (21.9 mi) W of Toowoomba CBD; 162 km (101 mi) W of Brisbane

Government
  - State electorate: Condamine
  - Federal divisions: Groom

Area
  - Total: 6.0 km^{2} (2.3 sq mi)

Population
  - Total: 10 (2021 census)
  - Density: 1.7/km^{2} (4.3/sq mi)
- Time zone: UTC+10:00 (AEST)
- Postcode: 4356
Suburbs around Motley
Mount Irving	Purrawunda	Aubigny
Mount Tyson	Motley	Linthorpe
Mount Tyson	Mount Tyson	Mount Tyson

Motley is a rural locality in the Toowoomba Region, Queensland, Australia. In the 2021 census, Motley had a population of 10 people.

== Geography ==
Motley is on the Darling Downs.

The Toowoomba–Cecil Plains Road enters the locality from the north-east (Aubigny / Linthorpe) and forms he north-eastern and northern boundaries of the locality. The Oakey-Pittswoth Road enters the locality from the north-east (Aubigny) and forms the south-eastern boundary of the locality.

The land use is predominantly crop growing with a small amount of grazing on native vegetation.

== History ==
The Cecil Plains railway line commenced construction in 1911 and the section passing through Motley opened on 20 September 1915 terminating at the newly named town of Evanslea. The line is now closed. There were two stations within the present-day locality:

- Purrawunda railway station (27.5384°S 151.6293°E)
- Motley railway station (27.54941°S 151.61430°E)

The locality takes its name from the former Motley railway station, which in turn was assigned its name on 5 August 1915 by the Queensland Railways Department derived from the parish name.

Motley State School opened on 14 August 1922 and closed on 14 July 1936. It was to the south-east of the Motley railway station (approx 27.54941°S 151.61430°E).

== Demographics ==
In the 2016 census, Motley had a population of 9 people.

In the 2021 census, Motley had a population of 10 people.

== Education ==
There are no schools in Motley. The nearest government primary schools are Mount Tyson State School in neighbouring Mount Tyson to the south-west and Biddeston State School in Biddeston to the east. The nearest government secondary school is Oakey State High School in Oakey to the north-east. There is also a Catholic primary school in Oakey and a number of other non-government schools in Toowoomba and its suburbs.
