= Mount Moriah, Queensland =

Mount Moriah
- Suburb
- Interactive map of Mount Moriah
- Coordinates: 27.4730°S 151.4847°E
- Country: Australia
- State: Queensland
- LGA: Toowoomba Region
- Location: 36.4 km (22.6 mi) WSW of Oakey; 53.3 km (33.1 mi) WNW of Toowoomba CBD; 56.2 km (34.9 mi) SE of Dalby; 182 km (113 mi) W of Brisbane

Government
  - State electorate: Condamine
  - Federal division: Groom

Area
  - Total: 25.4 km^{2} (9.8 sq mi)

Population
  - Total: 9 (2021 census)
  - Density: 0.354/km^{2} (0.92/sq mi)
- Time zone: UTC+10:00 (AEST)
- Postcode: 4403
Suburbs around Mount Moriah
West Prairie	West Prairie	Jondaryan
Bongeen	Mount Moriah	Jondaryan
Bongeen	Bongeen	Evanslea

Mount Moriah is a rural locality in the Toowoomba Region, Queensland, Australia. In the 2021 census, Mount Moriah had a population of 9 people.

== Demographics ==
In the 2016 census, Mount Moriah had a population of 10 people.

In the 2021 census, Mount Moriah had a population of 9 people.

== Education ==
There are no schools in Mount Moriah. The nearest government primary schools are Jondaryan State School in neighbouring Jondaryan to the north-east and Mount Tyson State School in Mount Tyson to the south-east. The nearest government secondary schools are Oakey State High School (to Year 12) in Oakey to the north-east and Cecil Plains State School in Cecil Plains to the south-west. There is also a Catholic primary school in Oakey.
