= Mount Irving, Queensland =

Mount Irving
- Suburb
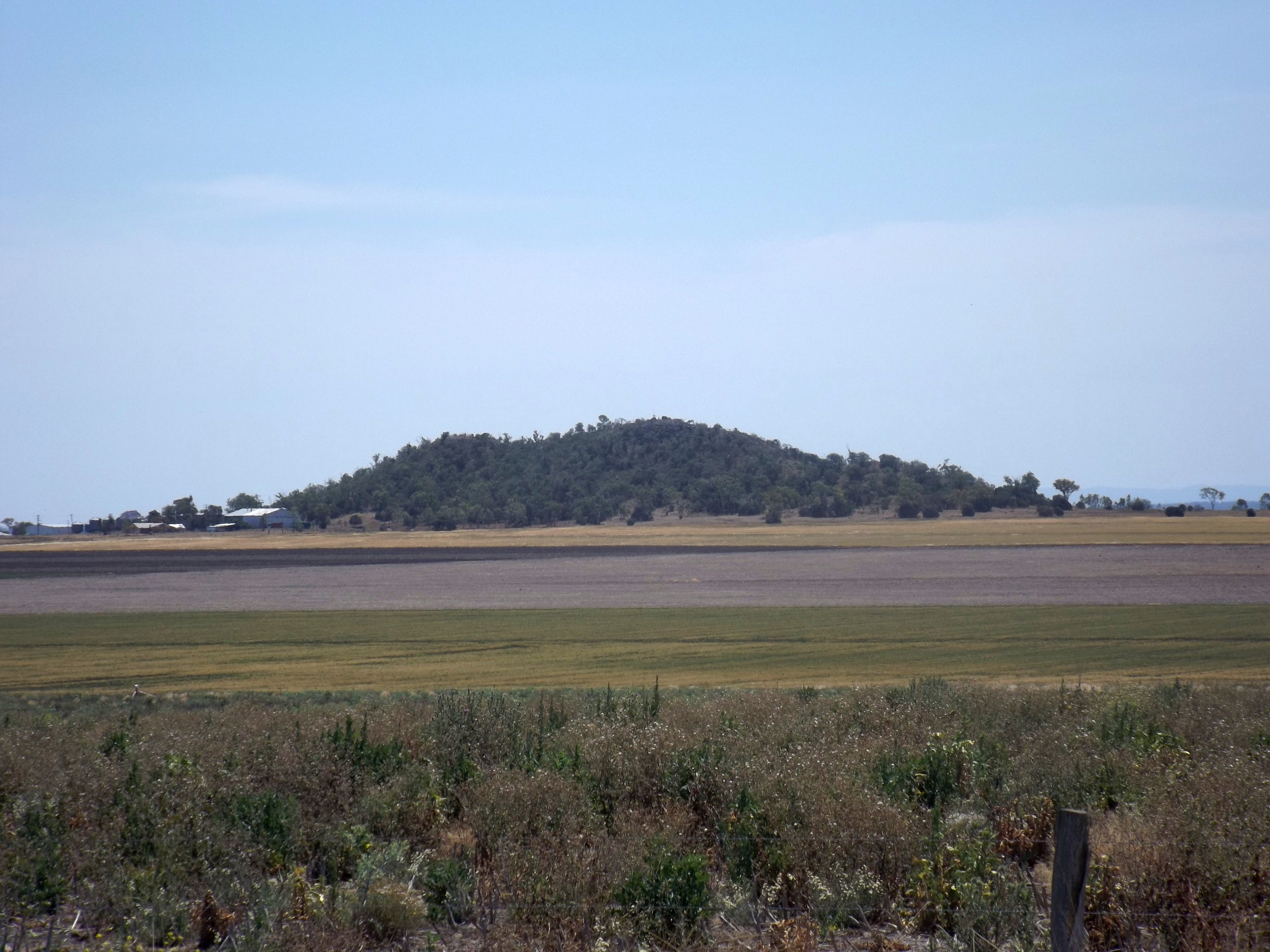
- Mount Irving, 2014

- Interactive map of Mount Irving
- Coordinates: 27.5144°S 151.5777°E
- Country: Australia
- State: Queensland
- LGA: Toowoomba Region
- Location: 21.8 km (13.5 mi) SE of Oakey; 29.7 km (18.5 mi) N of Pittsworth; 38.7 km (24.0 mi) W of Toowoomba CBD; 168 km (104 mi) W of Brisbane

Government
  - State electorate: Condamine
  - Federal division: Groom

Area
  - Total: 17.2 km^{2} (6.6 sq mi)

Population
  - Total: 34 (2021 census)
  - Density: 1.98/km^{2} (5.12/sq mi)
- Time zone: UTC+10:00 (AEST)
- Postcode: 4401
Suburbs around Mount Irving
| Evanslea | Yargullen | Yargullen |
| Mount Tyson | Mount Irving | Purrawunda |
| Mount Tyson | Mount Tyson | Motley |

Mount Irving is a rural locality in the Toowoomba Region, Queensland, Australia. In the 2021 census, Mount Irving had a population of 34 people.

== Geography ==
Mount Irving is on the Darling Downs.

The mountain Mount Irving is in the north-east of the locality (27.5101°S 151.5902°E) and its peak is at 463 metres (1,519 ft) above sea level; the surrounding plain being approximately 400 metres (1,300 ft).

The Toowoomba–Cecil Plains Road enters the locality from the south-east (Purrawunda / Motley), forms the southern boundary of the locality, and exits to the south-west (Evanslea).

The land use is predominantly crop growing with some grazing on native vegetation.

== History ==
The locality takes its name from the nearby mountain, which in run was named for Clark Irving of Warra (also known Warra Warra) pastoral run.

== Demographics ==
In the 2016 census, Mount Irving had a population of 15 people.

In the 2021 census, Mount Irving had a population of 34 people.

== Education ==
There are no schools in Mount Irving. The nearest government primary schools are Mount Tyson State School in neighbouring Mount Tyson to the south and Biddeston State School in Biddeston to the south-east. The nearest government secondary school is Oakey State High School in Oakey to the north-east.
