= West Prairie, Queensland =

West Prairie
- Suburb
- Interactive map of West Prairie
- Coordinates: 27.4433°S 151.4088°E
- Country: Australia
- State: Queensland
- LGA: Toowoomba Region
- Location: 40.5 km (25.2 mi) W of Oakey; 42.9 km (26.7 mi) SSE of Dalby; 66.1 km (41.1 mi) WNW of Toowoomba CBD; 195 km (121 mi) W of Brisbane

Government
  - State electorate: Condamine
  - Federal division: Groom

Area
  - Total: 143.2 km^{2} (55.3 sq mi)

Population
  - Total: 78 (2021 census)
  - Density: 0.545/km^{2} (1.411/sq mi)
- Time zone: UTC+10:00 (AEST)
- Postcode: 4403
Suburbs around West Prairie
| St Ruth | Formartin | Jondaryan |
| Tipton | West Prairie | Jondaryan |
| Nangwee | Norwin | Bongeen; Mount Moriah |

West Prairie is a rural locality in the Toowoomba Region, Queensland, Australia. In the 2021 census, West Prairie had a population of 78 people.

== History ==
The locality takes its name from the Prairie pastoral run operated by Henry Stuart Russell in 1855. On Buxton's Map of the Darling Downs, 1864, the run is shown in the hands of Russell and Taylor.

In 1877, 6,500 acres (2,600 ha) of land was resumed from the West Prairie pastoral run to establish smaller farms. The land was offered for selection on 24 April 1877.

West Prairie Provisional School opened on 19 January 1885. On 1 January 1909, it became West Prairie State School. In 1918, it became a half-time provisional school in conjunction with St Ruth Provisional School (meaning the two schools shared a single teacher) and then it closed in early 1919. It reopened on 25 August 1925 but closed permanently in 1929.

== Demographics ==
In the 2016 census, West Prairie had a population of 79 people.

In the 2021 census, West Prairie had a population of 78 people.

== Education ==
There are no schools in West Prairie. The nearest government primary schools are Cecil Plains State School in Cecil Plains to the south-west, Bowenville State School in Bowenville to the north, and Jondaryan State School in neighbouring Jondaryan to the north-east. The nearest government secondary schools are Cecil Plains State School (to Year 9), Dalby State High School in Dalby to the north, and Oakey State High School in Oakey to the east.
