= Cecil Plains railway line =

Railway line in Australia

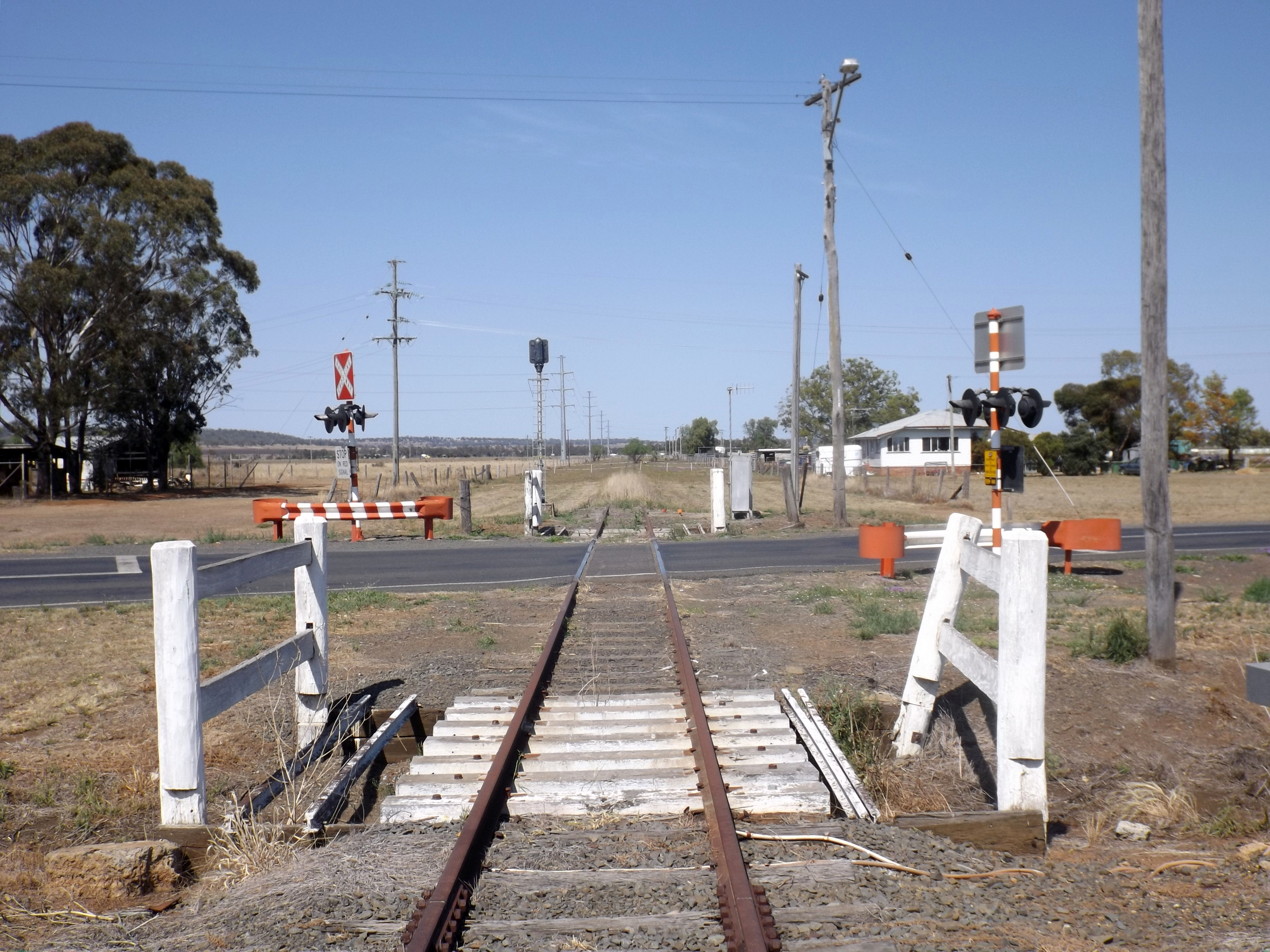
A branch line crossing at Oakey, 2014 (now used by Oakey Beef Exports to transport cattle to the abattoir)

The Cecil Plains Branch was a branch railway line on the Darling Downs in Queensland, Australia. It branched from the Western railway line at Oakey and terminated at Cecil Plains, a distance of 63 kilometres (39 mi). It operated from 1914 to 1994.

== History ==
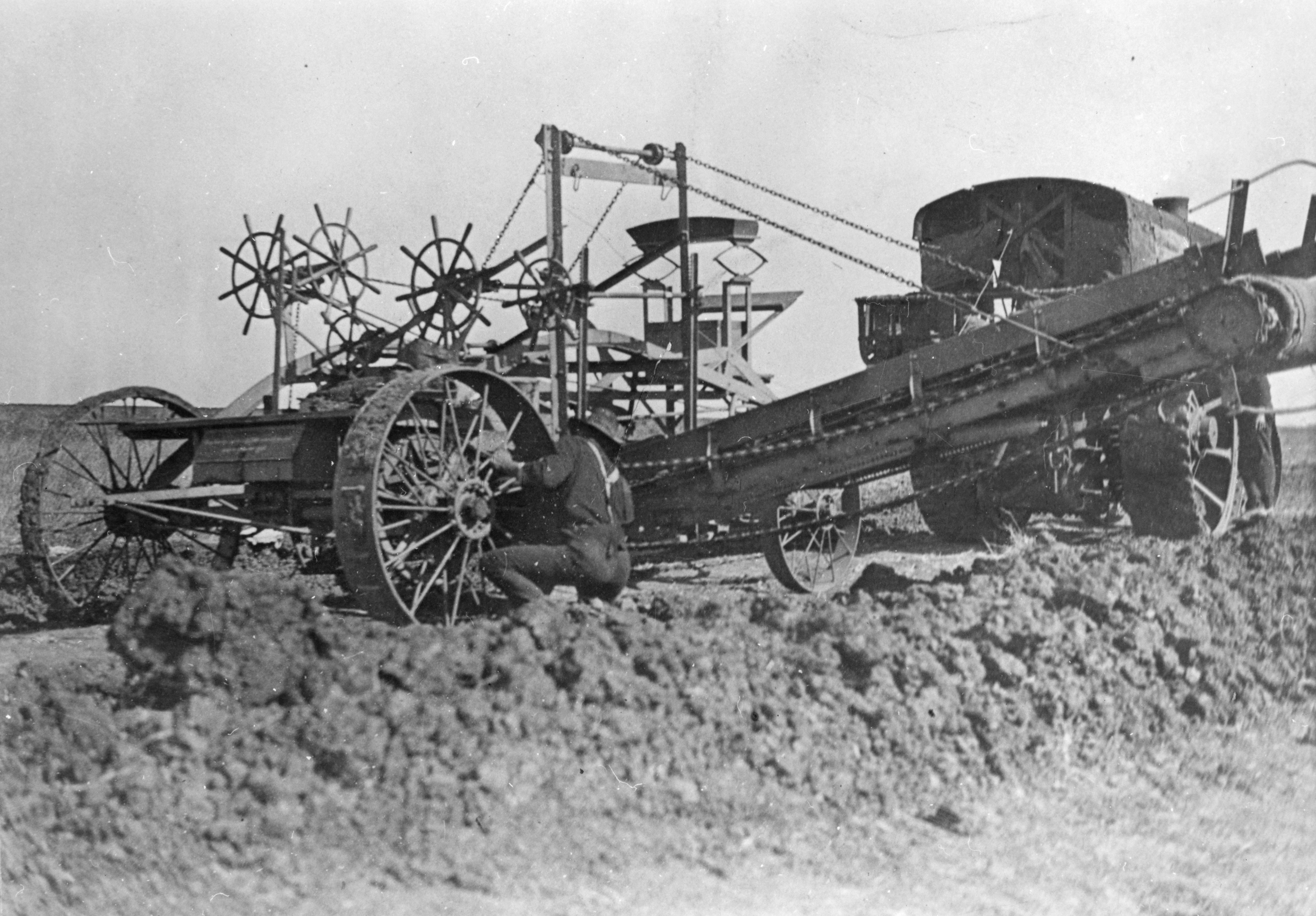
This grader was a traction engine powered designed to operate in the black soil, used in the construction of the Evanslea to Cecil Pains section of the line, 1919

On 5 December 1911, the Parliament of Queensland approved the construction of a 31-kilometre (19 mi) line to run from the Darling Downs town of Oakey southwest to the Mount Russell region.

Work began in May 1914 and the line to Mount Russell opened on 20 September 1915 terminating at the newly named town of Evanslea. Intermediate stops were established at Tangkam, Yargullen, Aubigny, Purrawunda, Motley, Boora-Mugga, Mount Tyson and Mondam.

In 1917, work began on a 32-kilometre (20 mi) extension of the line further west to Cecil Plains, with intermediate stops established at Norillee, Bongeen, Norwin, Mywybilla, Nangwee and Horrane. That section of the line opened on 29 April 1919.

A passenger rail motor service plied the line fortnightly during the 1940s, and weekly during the 1950s, until withdrawn.

The line was officially closed in 1994.

A 1.3-kilometre section of the Cecil Plains line was rebuilt in 2016, using more than 1900 sleepers and 2,300 tonnes of ballast. This was undertaken so as to allow Oakey Beef Exports to move cattle by rail (through Watco Australia) from Quilpie, Charleville, Morven, Roma and Mitchell.
