= Linthorpe, Queensland =

Linthorpe
- Suburb
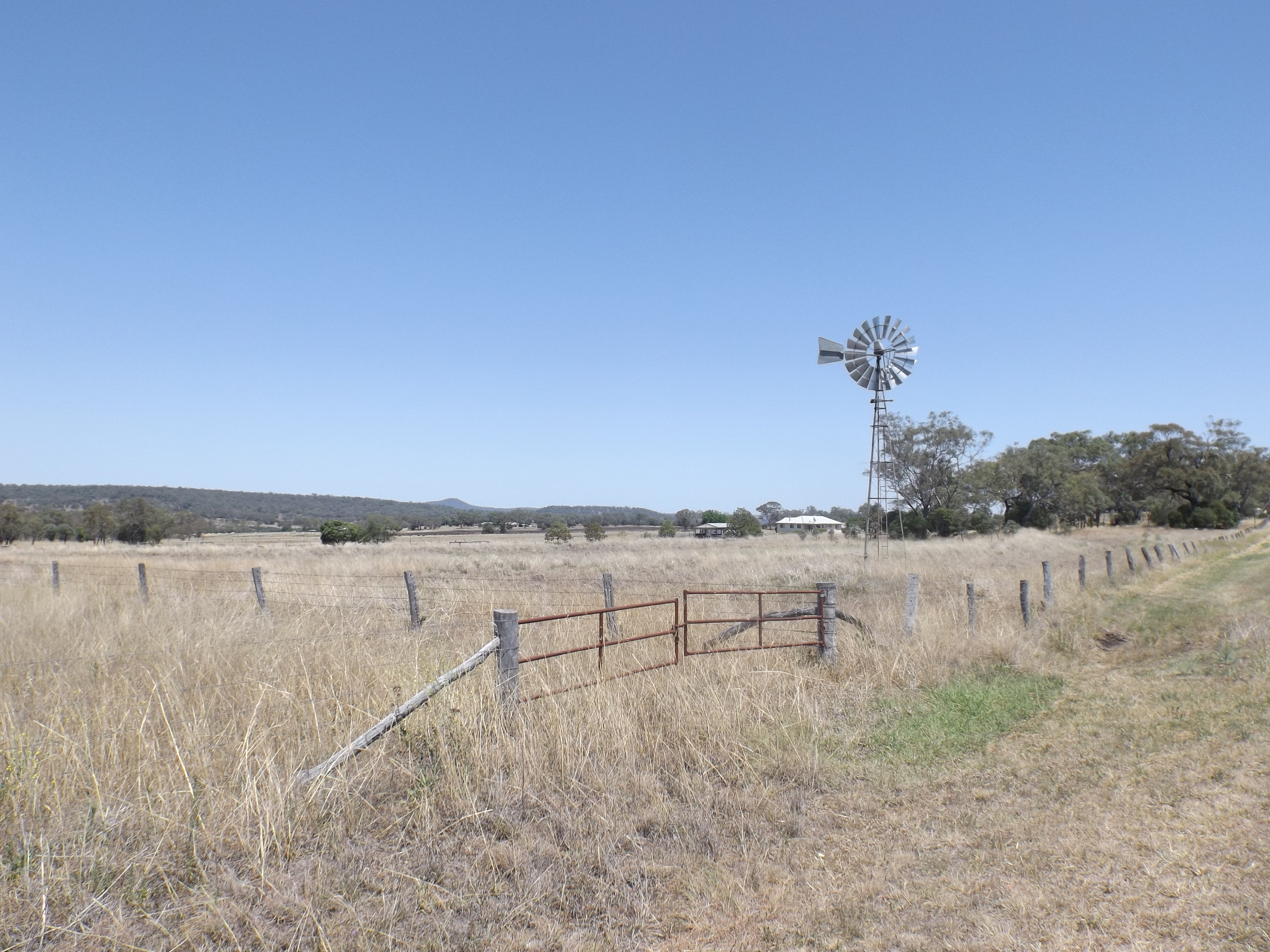
- Fields and windmill along Biddeston Linthorpe Road, 2014

- Interactive map of Linthorpe
- Coordinates: 27.5711°S 151.6555°E
- Country: Australia
- State: Queensland
- LGA: Toowoomba Region
- Location: 14.5 km (9.0 mi) N of Pittsworth; 24.5 km (15.2 mi) SSW of Oakey; 34.4 km (21.4 mi) W of Toowoomba CBD; 168 km (104 mi) W of Brisbane

Government
  - State electorate: Condamine
  - Federal division: Groom

Area
  - Total: 108.4 km^{2} (41.9 sq mi)

Population
  - Total: 416 (2021 census)
  - Density: 3.838/km^{2} (9.939/sq mi)
- Time zone: UTC+10:00 (AEST)
- Postcode: 4356
Suburbs around Linthorpe
Motley	Aubigny	Biddeston
Mount Tyson; Rossvale	Linthorpe	Southbrook
Stoneleigh	Pittsworth	Broxburn

Linthorpe is a rural locality in the Toowoomba Region, Queensland, Australia. In the 2021 census, Linthorpe had a population of 416 people.

== Geography ==
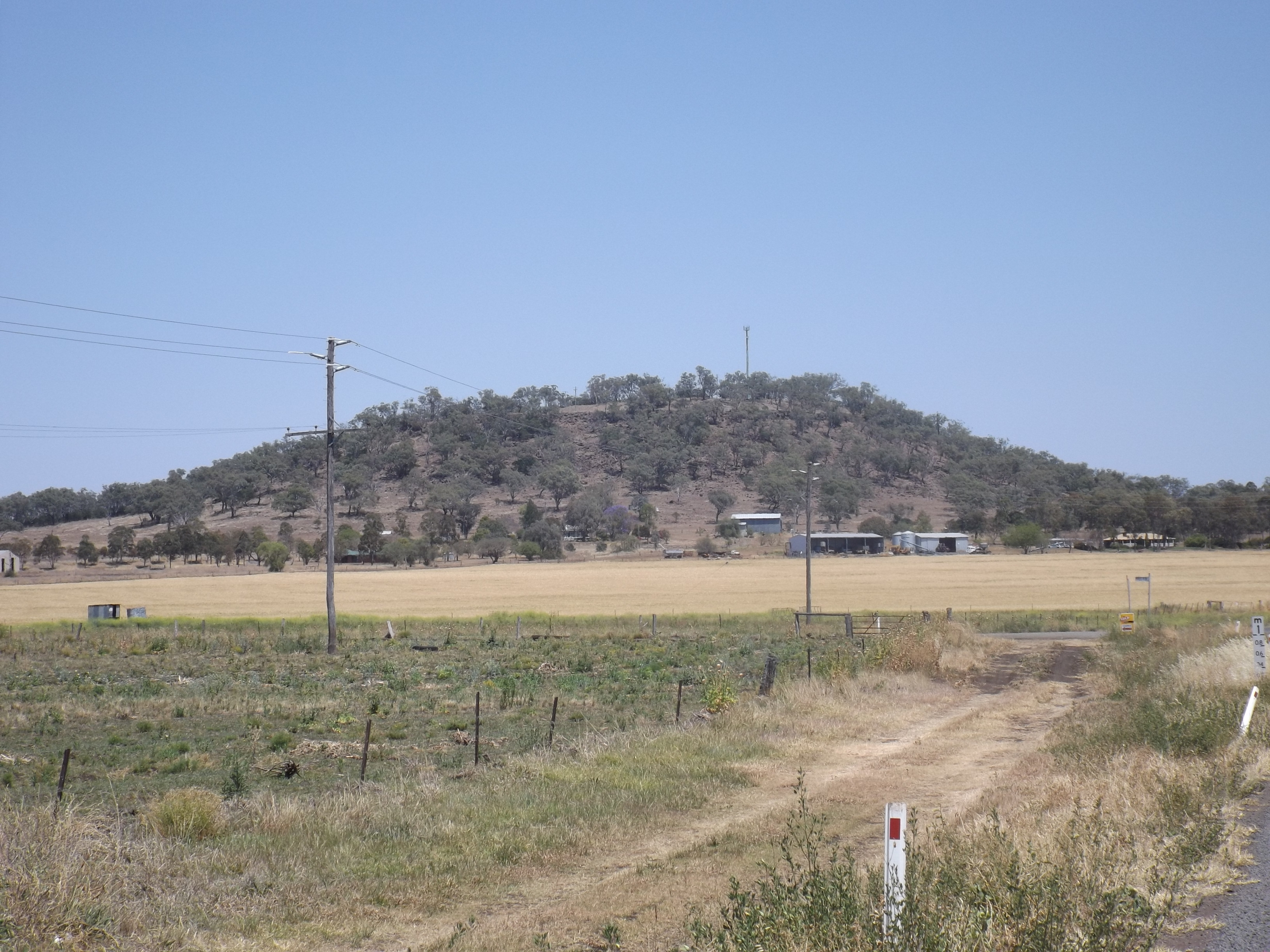
Mount Haystack, 2014

Linthorpe is on the Darling Downs.

The Gore Highway marks the southern boundary of Linthorpe. Toowoomba–Cecil Plains Road runs along the northern boundary, and the Oakey-Pittsworth Road runs along the north-western.

Linthorpe has the following mountains:

- Dummies Mountain (27.6277°S 151.6817°E) 610 metres (2,000 ft)
- Majuba Hill (27.6151°S 151.6980°E) 599 metres (1,965 ft)
- Mount Haystack (27.5462°S 151.6398°E) 528 metres (1,732 ft)

== History ==
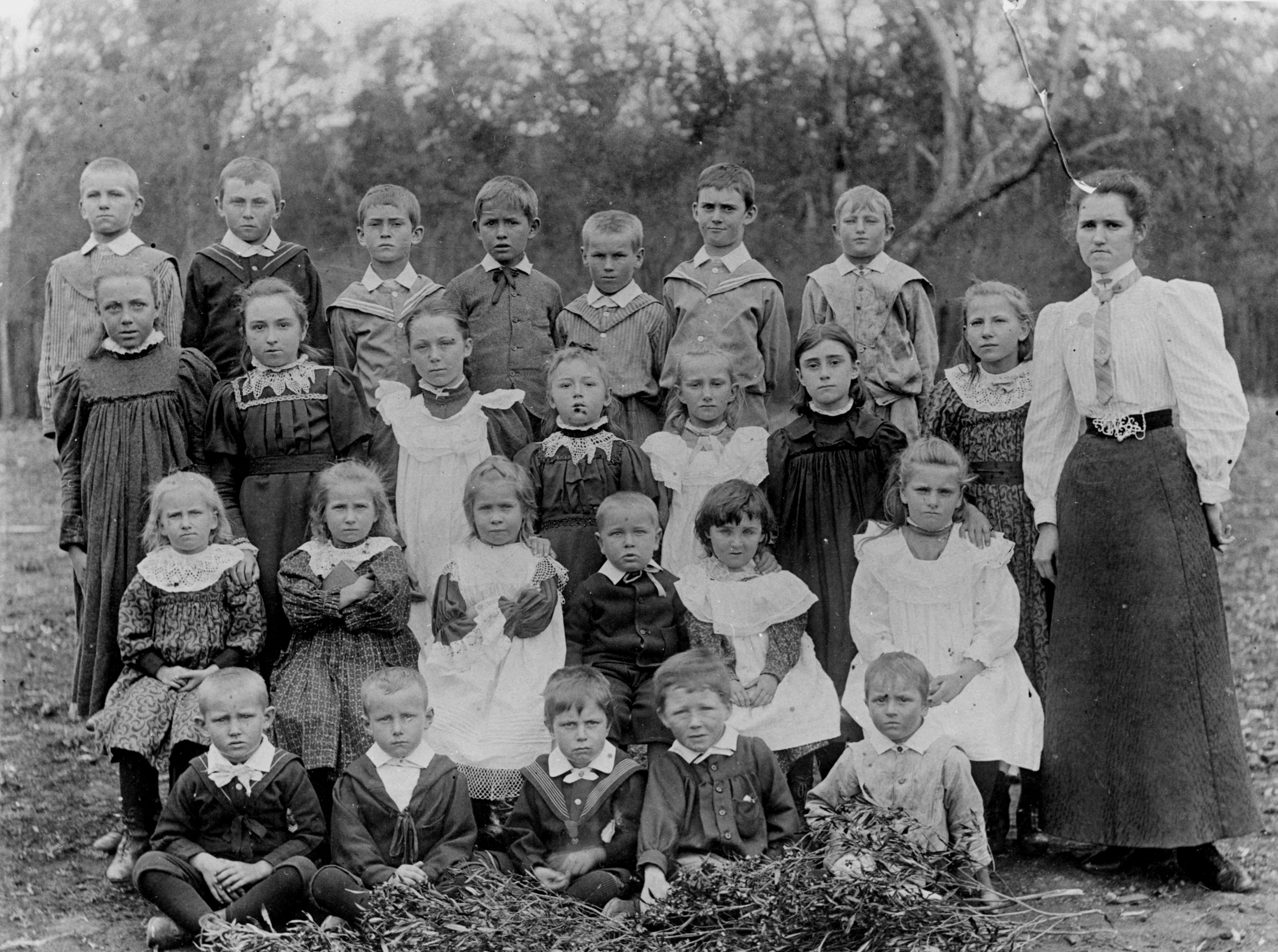
First day pupils, Linthorpe School

Motley Provisional School opened on 12 March 1900. In January 1901, it was renamed Linthorpe Provisional School. On 1 January 1909, it became Linthorpe State School. The school closed in 1960. It was at 1190 Stoneleigh Road (27.6038°S 151.6298°E).

== Demographics ==
In the 2016 census, Linthorpe had a population of 440 people.

In the 2021 census, Linthorpe had a population of 416 people.

== Education ==
There are no schools in Linthorpe. The nearest government primary schools are:

- Mount Tyson State School in neighbouring Mount Tyson to the west
- Biddeston State School in neighbouring Biddeston to the north-east
- Southbrook Central State School in neighbouring Southbrook to the east
- Pittsworth State School in neighbouring Pittsworth to the south

The nearest government secondary schools are Oakey State High School in Oakey to the north and Pittsworth State High School in Pittsworth to the south.
