= Purrawunda, Queensland =

Purrawunda
- Suburb
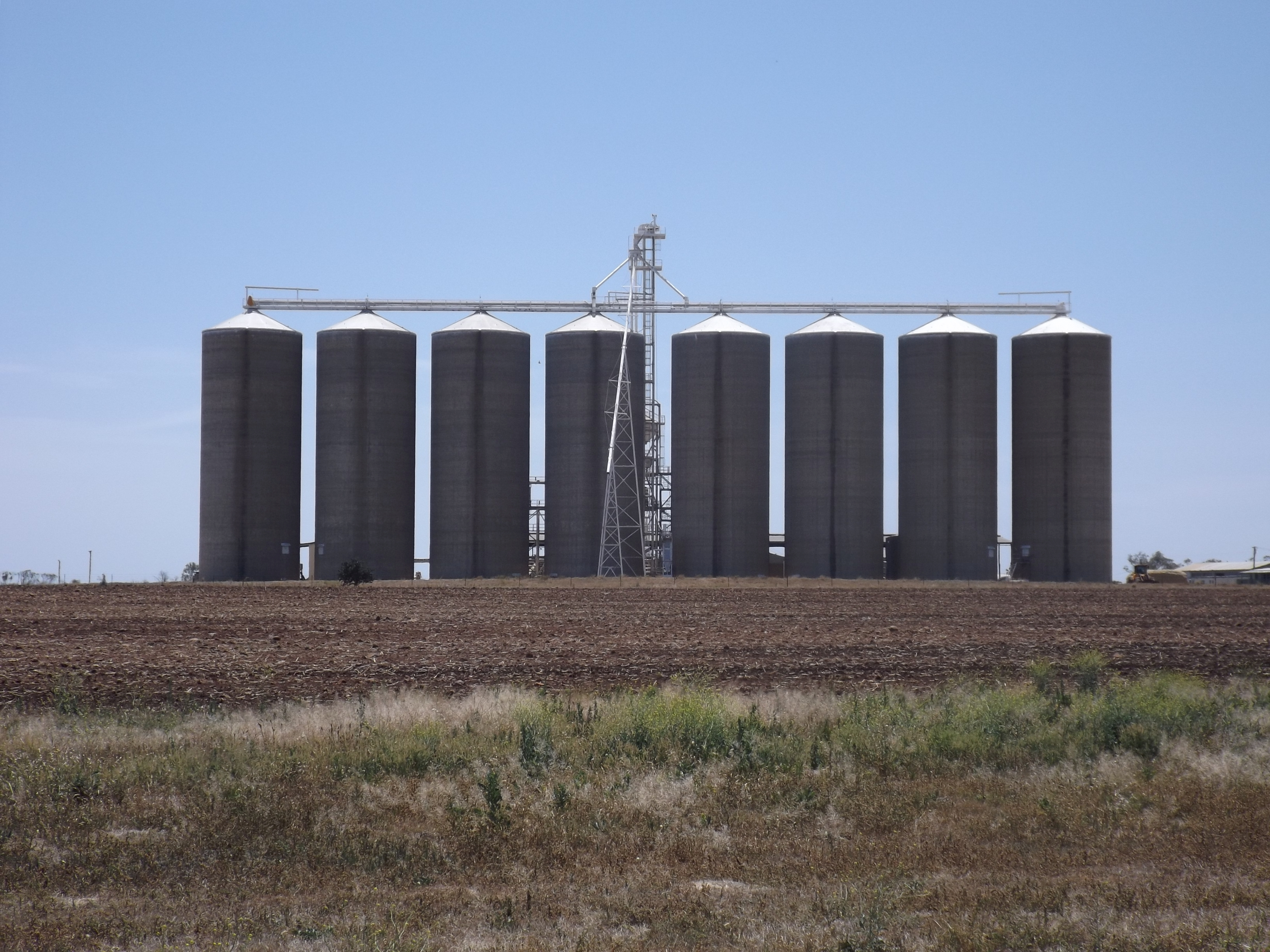
- Grain silos at the Beef City feedlot, 2014

- Interactive map of Purrawunda
- Coordinates: 27.5158°S 151.6141°E
- Country: Australia
- State: Queensland
- LGA: Toowoomba Region
- Location: 21.5 km (13.4 mi) SW of Oakey; 38.3 km (23.8 mi) W of Toowoomba CBD; 168 km (104 mi) W of Brisbane

Government
  - State electorate: Condamine
  - Federal division: Groom

Area
  - Total: 5.6 km^{2} (2.2 sq mi)

Population
  - Total: 12 (2021 census)
  - Density: 2.14/km^{2} (5.55/sq mi)
- Time zone: UTC+10:00 (AEST)
- Postcode: 4356
Suburbs around Purrawunda
Yargullen	Yargullen	Aubigny
Mount Irving	Purrawunda	Aubigny
Mount Tyson	Motley	Motley

Purrawunda is a rural locality in the Toowoomba Region, Queensland, Australia. In the 2021 census, Purrawunda had a population of 12 people.

== Geography ==
Purrawunda is on the Darling Downs. The Toowoomba–Cecil Plains Road runs along the southern boundary.

Soils in the area feature dark, medium clays which are fertile and well drained. The land use is predominantly crop growing. There is also some grazing on native vegetation and intensive animal husbandry (a feedlot).

== History ==
The name Purrawunda means big fight in the local Jagera language.

== Demographics ==
In the 2016 census, Purrawunda had a population of 6 people.

In the 2021 census, Purrawunda had a population of 12 people.

== Economy ==
JBS Australia, a subsidiary of JBS S.A. owns Beef City at Purrawunda (27.5266°S 151.6192°E). The beef abattoir is co-located with a feedlot so that meat quality and animal welfare can be maintained.

Australia's largest birdseed manufacturer, Avigrain, has a mill at Purrawunda and processes and stores grain at the old Purrawunda Grainco silos.

== Education ==
There are no schools in Purrawunda. The nearest government primary schools are Mount Tyson State School in neighbouring Mount Tyson to the south-west and Biddeston State School in Biddeston to the south-east. The nearest government secondary school is Oakey State High School in Oakey to the north-east.
