= Bongeen, Queensland =

Bongeen
- Suburb
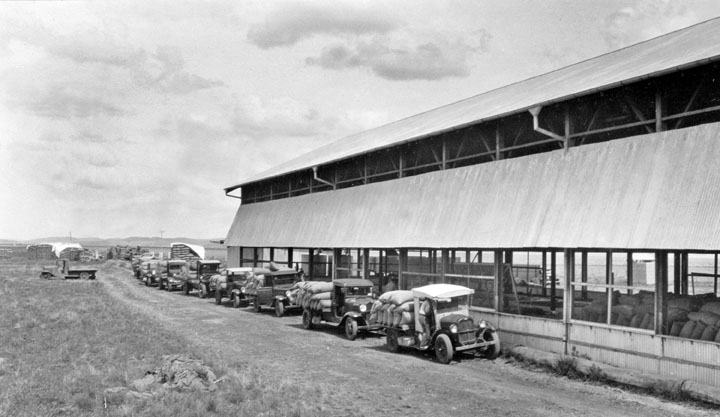
- Bags of wheat being delivered by motor vehicles at the grain shed, 1934

- Interactive map of Bongeen
- Coordinates: 27.52°S 151.4533°E
- Country: Australia
- State: Queensland
- LGA: Toowoomba Region
- Location: 27.9 km (17.3 mi) NW of Pittsworth; 43.0 km (26.7 mi) SW of Oakey; 57.5 km (35.7 mi) W of Toowoomba CBD; 187 km (116 mi) W of Brisbane

Government
  - State electorate: Condamine
  - Federal division: Groom

Area
  - Total: 112.0 km^{2} (43.2 sq mi)

Population
  - Total: 71 (2021 census)
  - Density: 0.634/km^{2} (1.642/sq mi)
- Time zone: UTC+10:00 (AEST)
- Postcode: 4356
Suburbs around Bongeen
West Prairie	Mount Moriah	Evanslea
Norwin	Bongeen	Mount Tyson
Branchview	Brookstead; St Helens	Irongate

Bongeen is a rural locality in the Toowoomba Region, Queensland, Australia. In the 2021 census, Bongeen had a population of 71 people.

== Geography ==
The now-closed Cecil Plains railway line passed through the locality. There were two railway stations within the locality on the line (both abandoned):

- Bongeen railway station (27.5663°S 151.4461°E)
- Norillee railway station (27.5703°S 151.4784°E)

The Toowoomba–Cecil Plains Road runs through from east to west.

== History ==
Bongeen State School opened on 4 May 1939. It was mothballed on 31 December 2005 and closed on 31 December 2006. It was at 7-15 Bongeen School Road (north-west corner of Pipeline Road, 27.5805°S 151.4450°E).

Bongeen Church of Christ opened 1964, opposite the school.

== Demographics ==
In the 2016 census, Bongeen had a population of 75 people.

In the 2021 census, Bongeen had a population of 71 people.

== Education ==
There are no schools in Bongeen. The nearest government primary schools are Mount Tyson State School in neighbouring Mount Tyson to the east, Brookstead State School in neighbouring Brookstead to the south, and Jondaryan State School in Jondaryan to the north-west. The nearest government secondary schools are Cecil Plains State School (to Year 10) in Cecil Plains to the west, Pittsworth State High School (to Year 12) in Pittsworth to the south-east, and Oakey State High School (to Year 12) in Oakey to the north-east.

== Amenities ==
Bongeen Church of Christ is on the north-east corner of Bongeen School Road and Pipeline Road (27.5807°S 151.4458°E).
