= Norwin, Queensland =

Norwin
- Suburb
- Interactive map of Norwin
- Coordinates: 27.5122°S 151.3802°E
- Country: Australia
- State: Queensland
- LGA: Toowoomba Region
- Location: 23.5 km (14.6 mi) E of Cecil Plains; 40.6 km (25.2 mi) NW of Pittsworth; 56.7 km (35.2 mi) W of Toowoomba; 187 km (116 mi) W of Brisbane

Government
  - State electorate: Condamine
  - Federal division: Groom

Area
  - Total: 115.6 km^{2} (44.6 sq mi)

Population
  - Total: 100 (2021 census)
  - Density: 0.9/km^{2} (2.2/sq mi)
- Time zone: UTC+10:00 (AEST)
- Postcode: 4356
Suburbs around Norwin
| Nangwee | West Prairie | Bongeen |
| Nangwee | Norwin | Bongeen |
| Branchview | Bongeen | Bongeen |

Norwin is a rural locality in the Toowoomba Region, Queensland, Australia. In the 2021 census, Norwin had a population of 100 people.

== Geography ==
The Toowoomba–Cecil Plains Road runs through from east to south-west.

== History ==
Norwin Provisional School opened on 5 September 1924. It was burned down in July 1925. In August 1927, it reopened as Norwin State School. It closed on 13 December 1996. It was at 5814 Toowoomba Cecil Plains Road (directly opposite Ziesemer Kummerow Road, 27.5437°S 151.3845°E).

The Norwin Methodist Church was established about September 1927, holding its 26th anniversary in September 1953.

A Lutheran congregation formed in Norwin in 1955. In 1957, the church building was dedicated. In 1967, a memorial hall was erected to commemorate those who served in World War II.

== Demographics ==
In the 2016 census, Norwin had a population of 94 people.

In the 2021 census, Norwin had a population of 100 people.

== Economy ==
There are a number of homesteads in the locality:

- Aeradke (27.5061°S 151.3574°E)
- Amaroo (27.5208°S 151.4301°E)
- Antrim (27.5276°S 151.4066°E)
- Aroona (27.5494°S 151.3292°E)
- Avonlea (27.6101°S 151.4022°E)
- Broxbourne (27.5031°S 151.3780°E)
- Cutana (27.5795°S 151.4014°E)
- Oakey (27.5646°S 151.3690°E)
- Springfields (27.4904°S 151.3947°E)
- Teralba (27.5732°S 151.3883°E)
- Wandana (27.5648°S 151.3802°E)
- Yanco (27.5502°S 151.3364°E)

== Education ==
There are no schools in Norwin. The nearest government primary schools are:

- Cecil Plains State School in Cecil Plains to the west
- Bowenville State School in Bowenville to the north-east
- Mount Tyson State School in Mount Tyson to the east
- Brookstead State School in Brookstead to the south

The nearest government secondary school is Cecil Plains State School (to Year 10). For secondary education to Year 12, the nearest government schools are Pittsworth State High School in Pittsworth to the south-east, Oakey State High School in Oakey to the north-east, and Dalby State High School in Dalby to the north.

== Amenities ==
The Norwin branch of the Queensland Country Women's Association has its hall on the corner of the Brookstead Norwin Road and Branchview Road (27.6109°S 151.3361°E).

Bethleham Lutheran Church is at 2671 Bowenville Norwin Road (corner Toowoomba Cecil Plains Road, 27.5146°S 151.3905°E).
