= Nangwee, Queensland =

Nangwee
- Town
- Interactive map of Nangwee
- Coordinates: 27.545°S 151.2875°E
- Country: Australia
- State: Queensland
- LGA: Toowoomba Region
- Location: 45.3 km (28.1 mi) NW of Pittsworth; 47.7 km (29.6 mi) S of Dalby; 71.5 km (44.4 mi) W of Toowoomba; 201 km (125 mi) W of Brisbane

Government
  - State electorate: Condamine
  - Federal division: Groom

Area
  - Total: 69.6 km^{2} (26.9 sq mi)

Population
  - Total: 65 (2021 census)
  - Density: 0.934/km^{2} (2.419/sq mi)
- Time zone: UTC+10:00 (AEST)
- Postcode: 4407
Localities around Nangwee
| Tipton | West Prairie | Norwin |
| Cecil Plains | Nangwee | Norwin |
| Cecil Plains | Condamine Plains | Branchview |

Nangwee is a rural town and locality in the Toowoomba Region, Queensland, Australia. In the 2021 census, the locality of Nangwee had a population of 65 people.

== Geography ==
The now-closed Cecil Plains railway line enters the locality from the east (Norwin) and exits to the west (Cecil Plains) with two now-abandoned stations serving the locality:

- Mywybilla railway station at the eastern boundary of the locality with Norwin (27.5529°S 151.3405°E)
- Nangwee railway station in the town in the west of the locality (27.5461°S 151.2903°E).

The Toowoomba–Cecil Plains Road runs through the locality from east to west.

== History ==
The town takes its name from the Nangwee railway station, which was assigned on 12 December 1918 by the Queensland Railways Department, on the former Cecil Plains railway line, and is an Aboriginal word meaning muddy water.

Nangwee Provisional School opened on 7 June 1921. On 1 September 1922 it became Nangwee State School. It closed on 13 August 1961. It was at 69 McPherson Road (27.5440°S 151.2852°E).

== Demographics ==
In the 2016 census, the locality of Nangwee had a population of 52 people.

In the 2021 census, the locality of Nangwee had a population of 65 people.

== Education ==
There are no schools in Nangwee. The nearest government primary school is Cecil Plains State School in neighbouring Cecil Plains to the west. The nearest government secondary schools are Cecil Plains State School (to Year 10), Dalby State High School (to Year 12) in Dalby to the north and Pittsworth State High School (to Year 12) in Pittsworth to the south-east.
