= Evanslea, Queensland =

Evanslea
- Suburb
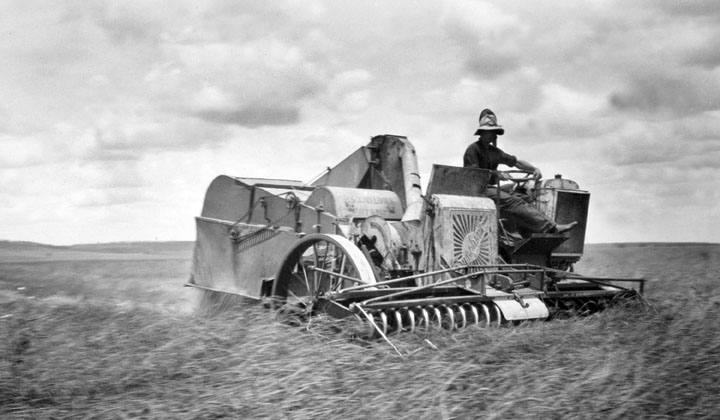
- Harvesting at Evanslea, 1934

- Interactive map of Evanslea
- Coordinates: 27.5213°S 151.5180°E
- Country: Australia
- State: Queensland
- LGA: Toowoomba Region
- Location: 24.7 km (15.3 mi) SW of Oakey; 28.7 km (17.8 mi) NNW of Pittsworth; 41.5 km (25.8 mi) W of Toowoomba CBD; 169 km (105 mi) W of Brisbane

Government
  - State electorate: Condamine
  - Federal division: Groom

Area
  - Total: 58.6 km^{2} (22.6 sq mi)

Population
  - Total: 31 (2021 census)
  - Density: 0.529/km^{2} (1.370/sq mi)
- Time zone: UTC+10:00 (AEST)
- Postcode: 4356
Suburbs around Evanslea
Mount Moriah	Jondaryan	Yargullen
Bongeen	Evanslea	Mount Irving
Bongeen	Mount Tyson	Mount Tyson

Evanslea is a rural locality in the Toowoomba Region, Queensland, Australia. In the 2021 census, Evanslea had a population of 31 people.

== Geography ==
The Toowoomba–Cecil Plains Road runs through from east to west.

Evanslea railway station is an abandoned railway station on the closed Cecil Plains railway line (27.5681°S 151.5105°E).

Norillee is a neighbourhood (27.5666°S 151.4833°E).

The land use is predominantly crop growing with some grazing on native vegetation, mostly in the south-east of the locality.

Evanslea has the following mountains:

- Mount Russell (27.5604°S 151.5176°E) 501 metres (1,644 ft)
- Mount Taylor (27.5644°S 151.5347°E) 534 metres (1,752 ft)

== History ==
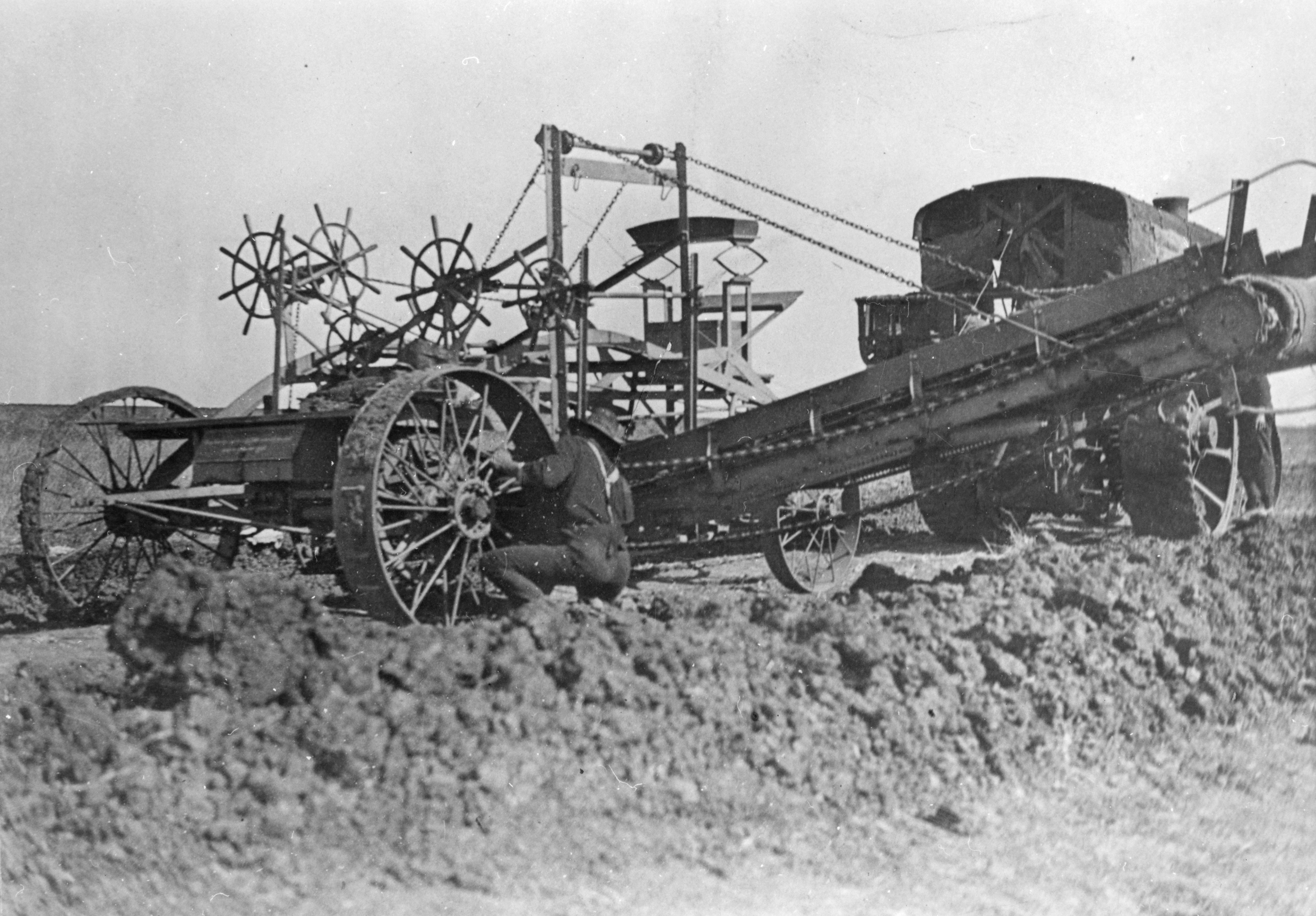
Constructing the railway from Evanslea to Cecil Plains, 1919

The locality takes its name from the Evanslea railway station, which was named after Charles Barnard Evans, Commissioner for Railways in Queensland from 1911 to 1918. The railway station on the Cecil Plains railway line opened in September 1915 with Evanslea as its terminus. It was subsequently extended to Cecil Plains.

The neighbourhood of Norillee takes its name from the Norillee railway station (in neighbouring Bongeen), which was named by the Queensland Railways Department on12 December 1918. It is an Aboriginal name meaning mountain ridge or series of peaks.

== Demographics ==
In the 2016 census, Evanslea had a population of 41 people.

In the 2021 census, Evanslea had a population of 31 people.

== Economy ==
There are a number of homesteads in the locality:

- Mount Russell (27.5649°S 151.5185°E)
- Poplar (27.4923°S 151.5408°E)
- Prairie View (27.5392°S 151.5122°E)
- Rockwood (27.5128°S 151.5295°E)
- Shiralee (27.5660°S 151.5089°E)
- Valhalla (27.5272°S 151.5177°E)

== Education ==
There are no schools in Evanslea. The nearest government primary schools are Mount Tyson State School in neighbouring Mount Tyson to the south-east and Jondaryan State School in neighbouring Jondaryan to the north. The nearest government secondary schools are Oakey State High School in Oakey to the north-east and Pittsworth State High School in Pittsworth to the south-east.

There are Catholic primary schools in Oakey and Pittsworth.
