= Aubigny, Queensland =

Aubigny
- Town
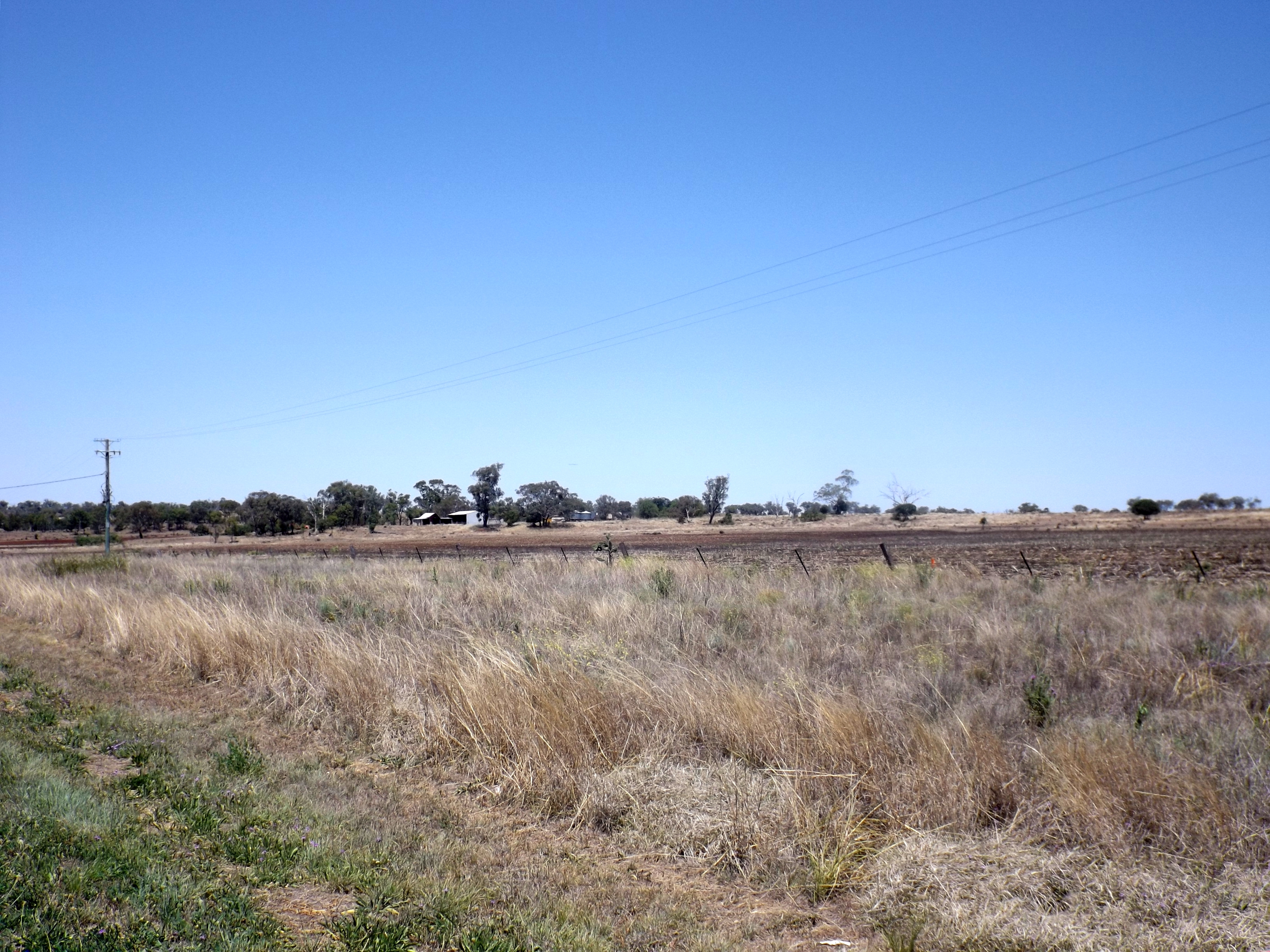
- Fields along Oakey Crosshill Road, 2014

- Interactive map of Aubigny
- Coordinates: 27.5230°S 151.6463°E
- Country: Australia
- State: Queensland
- LGA: Toowoomba Region
- Location: 13.7 km (8.5 mi) SW of Oakey; 34.9 km (21.7 mi) WNW of Toowoomba; 165 km (103 mi) W of Brisbane

Government
  - State electorate: Condamine
  - Federal division: Groom

Area
  - Total: 57.4 km^{2} (22.2 sq mi)
- Elevation: 430 m (1,410 ft)

Population
  - Total: 283 (2021 census)
  - Density: 4.930/km^{2} (12.77/sq mi)
- Time zone: UTC+10:00 (AEST)
- Postcode: 4401
Localities around Aubigny
Jondaryan	Oakey	Oakey
Purrawunda; Yargullen	Aubigny	Biddeston
Motley	Linthorpe	Biddeston

Aubigny is a rural town and locality in the Toowoomba Region, Queensland, Australia. In the 2021 census, the locality of Aubigny had a population of 283 people.

== Geography ==
The former locality of Tangkam (27°28′59″S 151°40′00″E) is in the northern part of Aubigny. It took its name from the Tangkam railway station (27.4745°S 151.6725°E) on the Cecil Plains railway line. The name Tangkam is believed to be an Aboriginal word meaning sour.

The Toowoomba–Cecil Plains Road runs along the southern boundary, and the Oakey-Pittsworth Road passes through from north-east to south-west.

== History ==
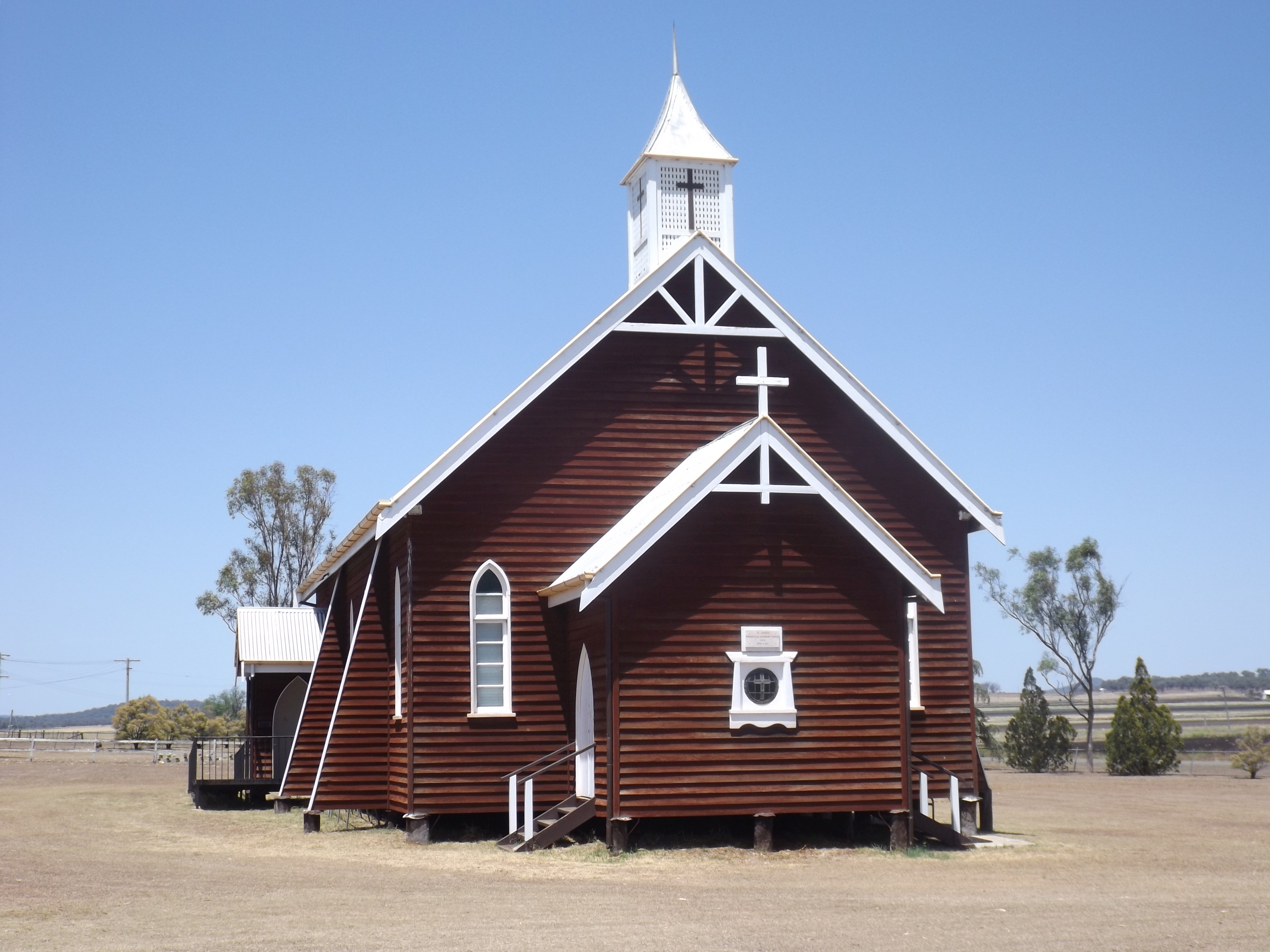
St Johns Lutheran Church, 2014

Town and suburban lots in Aubigny were offered for sale in September 1857.

Crosshill State School opened on 9 August 1880 and closed in 1940. It was at 317 Ciesiolka Road (27.5093°S 151.6826°E).

Aubigny was at the centre of the Westbrook Homestead area.

The town lots were offered for sale in the new town of Aubigny in December 1885, but only two lots were sold at that time, one to the Lutheran church and one to the Catholic church.

St John's Lutheran Church opened in 1886. On Sunday 22 September 1929, a new larger church was built with the 1886 church becoming the church hall.

Aubigny Post Office opened around September 1907 (a receiving office had been open since 1894) and closed in 1968.

Aubigny State School opened 24 January 1921 and closed about 27 October 1967. It was at 1309 Oakey Pittsworth Road (27.5204°S 151.6455°E).

The town was serviced by the Cecil Plains railway line between 1915 and 1994.

Tangkam State School opened on 26 November 1918. It closed on 22 January 1961. It was at 25 Brennan Road (27.4712°S 151.6737°E).

== Demographics ==
In the 2011 census, the locality of Aubigny had a population of 386 people.

In the 2016 census, the locality of Aubigny had a population of 254 people.

In the 2021 census, the locality of Aubigny had a population of 283 people.

== Education ==
There are no schools in Aubigny. The nearest government primary schools are Oakey State School in neighbouring Oakey to the north and Biddeston State School in neighbouring Biddeston to the east. The nearest government secondary school is Oakey State High School, also in Oakey.

== Amenities ==
St John's Lutheran Church is at 2 Aubigny Crosshill Road (27.5220°S 151.6428°E). It is part of the Australian Evangelical Lutheran Church.
