= Branchview, Queensland =

Branchview
- Suburb
- Interactive map of Branchview
- Coordinates: 27.6191°S 151.3511°E
- Country: Australia
- State: Queensland
- LGA: Toowoomba Region
- Location: 19.3 km (12.0 mi) SE of Cecil Plains; 37.5 km (23.3 mi) NW of Pittsworth; 71.1 km (44.2 mi) W of Toowoomba; 201 km (125 mi) W of Brisbane

Government
  - State electorate: Condamine
  - Federal division: Groom

Area
  - Total: 63.7 km^{2} (24.6 sq mi)

Population
  - Total: 37 (2021 census)
  - Density: 0.581/km^{2} (1.504/sq mi)
- Time zone: UTC+10:00 (AEST)
- Postcode: 4352
Suburbs around Branchview
Nangwee	Norwin	Norwin
Cecil Plains	Branchview	Bongeen
Condamine Plains	Condamine Plains	Brookstead

Branchview is a rural locality in the Toowoomba Region, Queensland, Australia. In the 2021 census, Branchview had a population of 37 people.

== History ==
Norwin Provisional School opened on 5 September 1924. It was burned down in July 1925. In August 1927 it reopened as Norwin State School. It closed on 13 December 1996. It was located on Clapham Road in Branchview (approx 27.5887°S 151.3683°E).

Branch View State School opened on 2 April 1931. It closed in December 1942 but reopened in July 1943. It closed in December 1944 and did not reopen until 1952. It closed permanently in March 1966. The school was located on the southern corner of the intersection of Branchview Road and Nangwee Road (27.61163°S 151.33603°E).

== Demographics ==
In the 2016 census Branchview had a population of 17 people.

In the 2021 census, Branchview had a population of 37 people.

== Economy ==
There are a number of homesteads in the locality:

- Lone Pine (27.6609°S 151.3432°E)
- Netherby (27.6289°S 151.3599°E)
- Orroboree Downs (27.6151°S 151.3206°E)
- Springfield (27.6040°S 151.3569°E)
- Wahroonga (27.6228°S 151.3531°E)
- Wando (27.6440°S 151.3372°E)
- West End (27.6471°S 151.3762°E)

== Education ==
There are no schools in Branchview. The nearest government primary schools are Cecil Plains State School in neighbouring Cecil Plains to the north-west and Brookstead State School in neighbouring Brookstead to the south-east. The nearest government secondary schools are Cecil Plains State School (to Year 10) and Pittsworth State High School (to Year 12) in Pittsworth to the south-east.
