= Biddeston, Queensland =

Biddeston
- Town
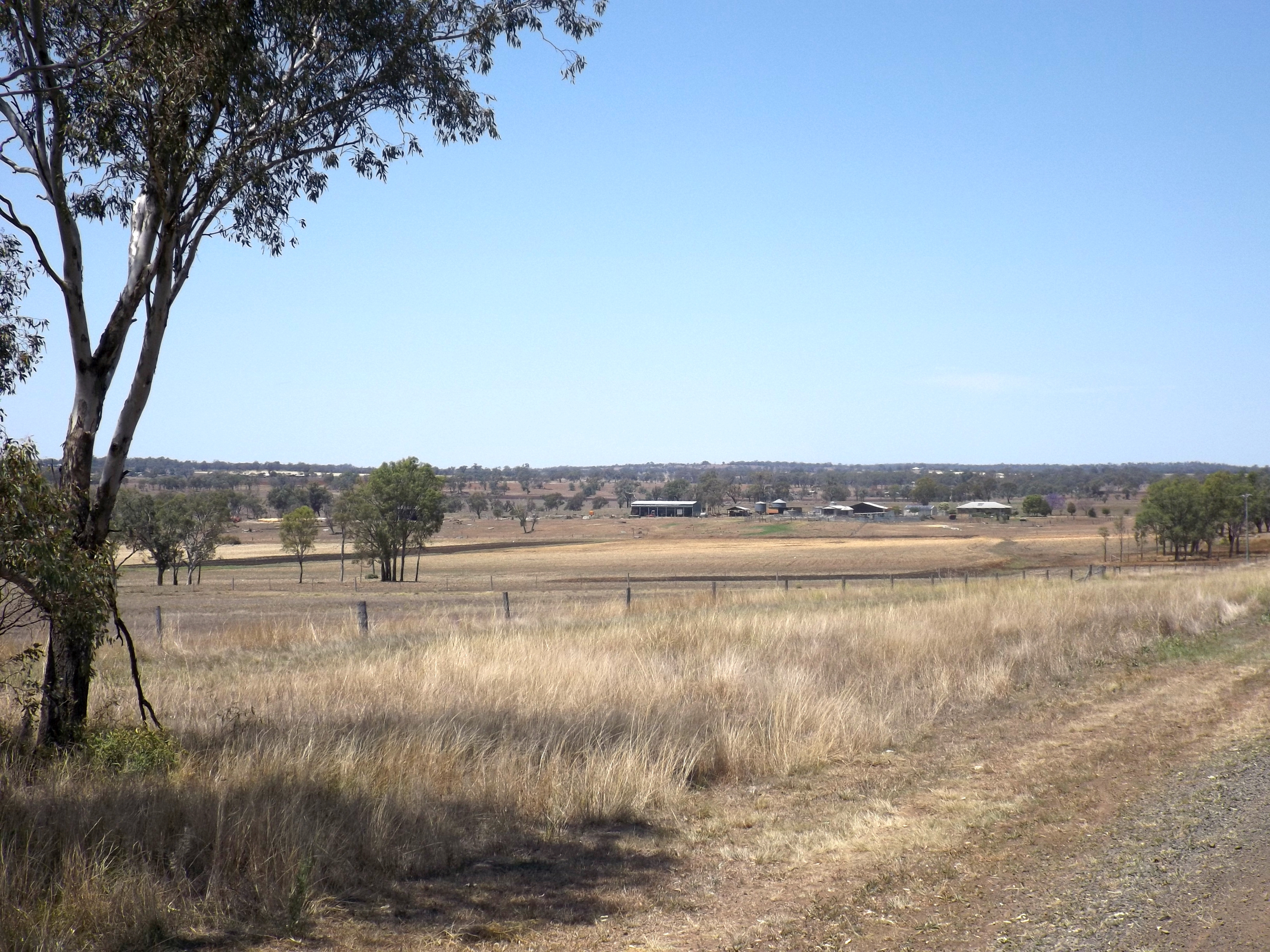
- Fields along Oakey Biddleston Road, 2014

- Interactive map of Biddeston
- Coordinates: 27.5702°S 151.7155°E
- Country: Australia
- State: Queensland
- City: Toowoomba Region
- LGA: Toowoomba Region
- Location: 13.9 km (8.6 mi) S of Oakey; 23.6 km (14.7 mi) W of Toowoomba; 155 km (96 mi) W of Brisbane

Government
  - State electorate: Condamine
  - Federal division: Groom

Area
  - Total: 73.8 km^{2} (28.5 sq mi)

Population
  - Total: 269 (2021 census)
  - Density: 3.645/km^{2} (9.440/sq mi)
- Time zone: UTC+10:00 (AEST)
- Postcode: 4401
Localities around Biddeston
Aubigny	Oakey	Kingsthorpe
Linthorpe	Biddeston	Wellcamp; Westbrook
Linthorpe	Southbrook	Athol

Biddeston is a rural town and locality in the Toowoomba Region, Queensland, Australia. In the 2021 census, the locality of Biddeston had a population of 269 people.

== Geography ==
The Toowoomba–Cecil Plains Road runs through from east to west.

== History ==
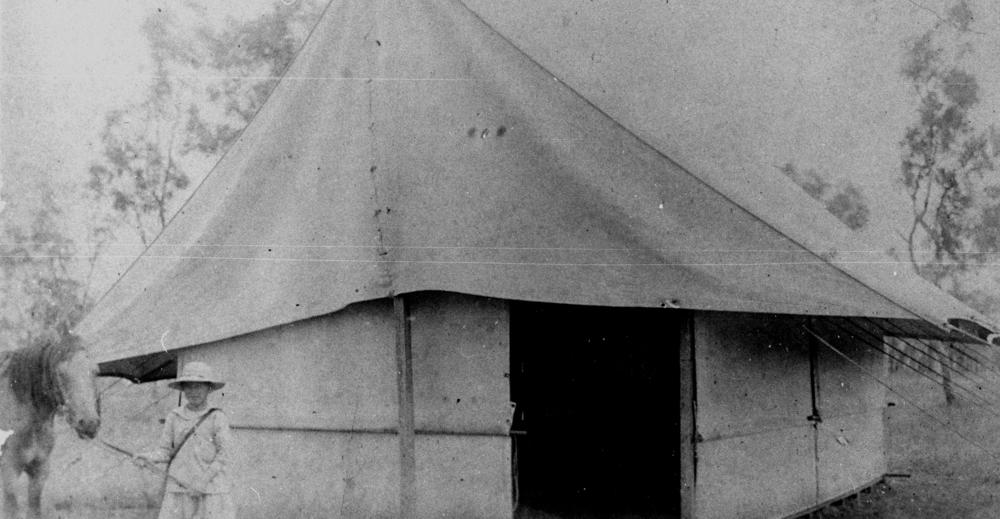
Biddeston State School opened in a tent, Queensland, 1919

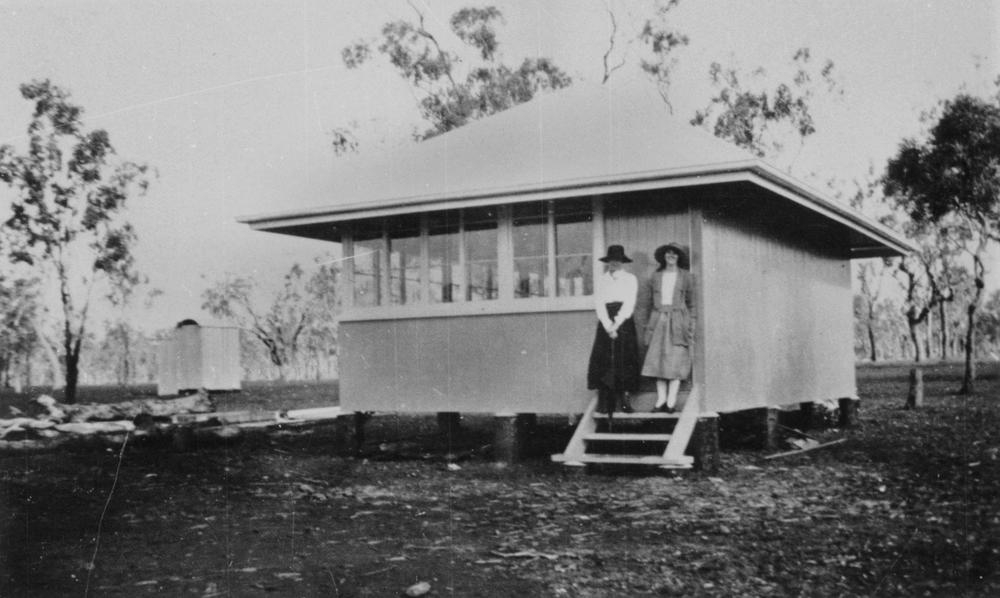
The one-room school at Biddeston, circa 1921

Crosshill State School opened on 9 August 1880 and closed in 1940.

A postal receiving office opened on 1 February 1882 and was upgraded to a post office on 1 July 1927. During that time it was run by the Anderson family of Biddeston Farm, which is probably the origin of the district name. The post office closed on 5 January 1965.

The town reserve was established on 26 August 1890.

In 1880, a 10-acre block of land on the Oakey-Southbrook Road was aside for a school. However, it was not until 14 October 1919 that the Biddeston State School finally opened, but with only a tent for a schoolroom for the 14 children enrolled under teacher Margaret Cecilla Cloherty Anderson. It was not until 10 October 1921 that the Education Department built a one-room timber building to replace the tent. Despite growing enrolment numbers, the Education Department would not enlarge the building apart from the addition of a verandah in 1927. It was not until 1954 that a second school room was built. A pre-school was added in 1986.

Burton Provisional School opened on 22 February 1900. On 1 January 1909, it became Burton State School. It closed on 5 December 1944. It was at 1840 Toowoomba Cecil Plains Road (27.5494°S 151.7531°E).

Biddeston was the site of the Biddeston Murders that took place on 2 March 2015 when a grandfather killed his pregnant daughter and grandson.

== Demographics ==
In the 2011 census, the locality of Biddeston had a population of 328 people.

In the 2016 census, the locality of Biddeston had a population of 284 people.

In the 2021 census, the locality of Biddeston had a population of 269 people.

== Economy ==
There are a number of homesteads in the locality:

- Aberdeen (27.5400°S 151.7467°E)
- Aughamore (27.5684°S 151.7285°E)
- Bronte Park (27.5705°S 151.7445°E)
- Burton (27.5404°S 151.7489°E)
- Chelandry (27.5726°S 151.7306°E)
- Croxley (27.5294°S 151.7419°E)
- Egmont Park (27.6024°S 151.7302°E)
- Enterprise (27.5125°S 151.7486°E)
- Glen Bride (27.5391°S 151.7388°E)
- Glen View (27.5838°S 151.7333°E)
- Goldrush Lodge (27.5843°S 151.7264°E)
- Hillview (27.5810°S 151.7519°E)
- Kerrabee Park (27.5445°S 151.7552°E)
- Lange (27.5546°S 151.7315°E)
- Martrise (27.5349°S 151.7018°E)
- Mayfield (27.5448°S 151.7591°E)
- Parklands (27.5659°S 151.7419°E)
- Rayhill (27.5865°S 151.7114°E)
- Roxanna (27.5513°S 151.7511°E)
- Silver Springs (27.5899°S 151.7291°E)
- The Towers (27.5145°S 151.7221°E)
- Wallaby Hill (27.6012°S 151.7323°E)
- Windemere (27.5506°S 151.7501°E)
- Ziebel (27.5203°S 151.7328°E)

== Education ==
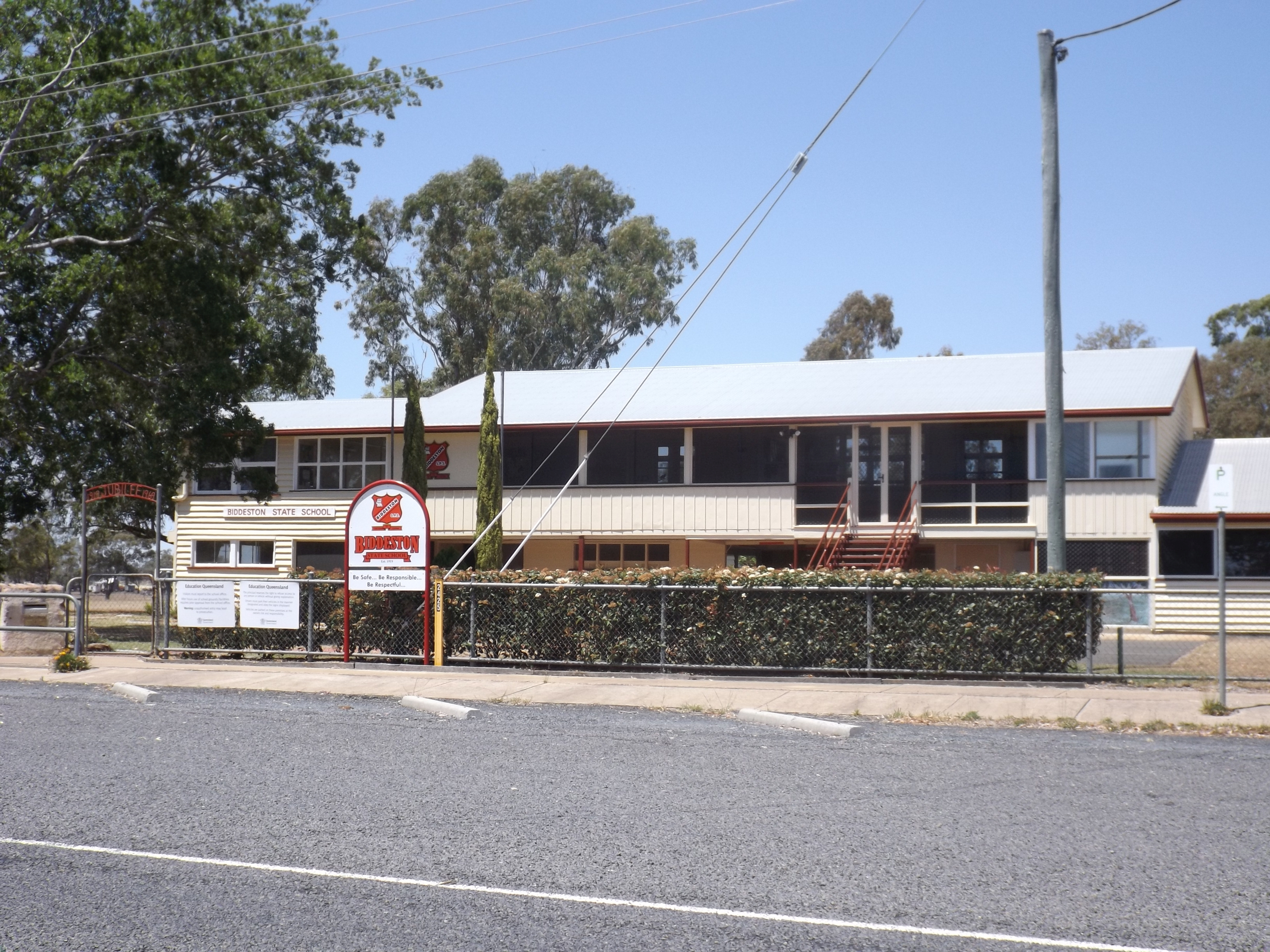
Biddeston State School, 2014

Biddeston State School is a government primary (Prep-6) school for boys and girls at 2425 Cecil Plains Road (27.5541°S 151.6973°E). In 2017, the school had an enrolment of 61 students with 5 teachers (4 full-time equivalent) and 6 non-teaching staff (3 full-time equivalent). In 2018, the school had an enrolment of 70 students with 6 teachers (4 full-time equivalent) and 6 non-teaching staff (3 full-time equivalent).

There is no secondary schools in Biddeston. The nearest government secondary school is Oakey State High School in neighbouring Oakey to the north.

== Events ==
The Biddeston Tractor Pull is an annual event in which restored and modified tractors compete to pull heavy loads.
