= Oakey, Queensland =

Oakey
- Town
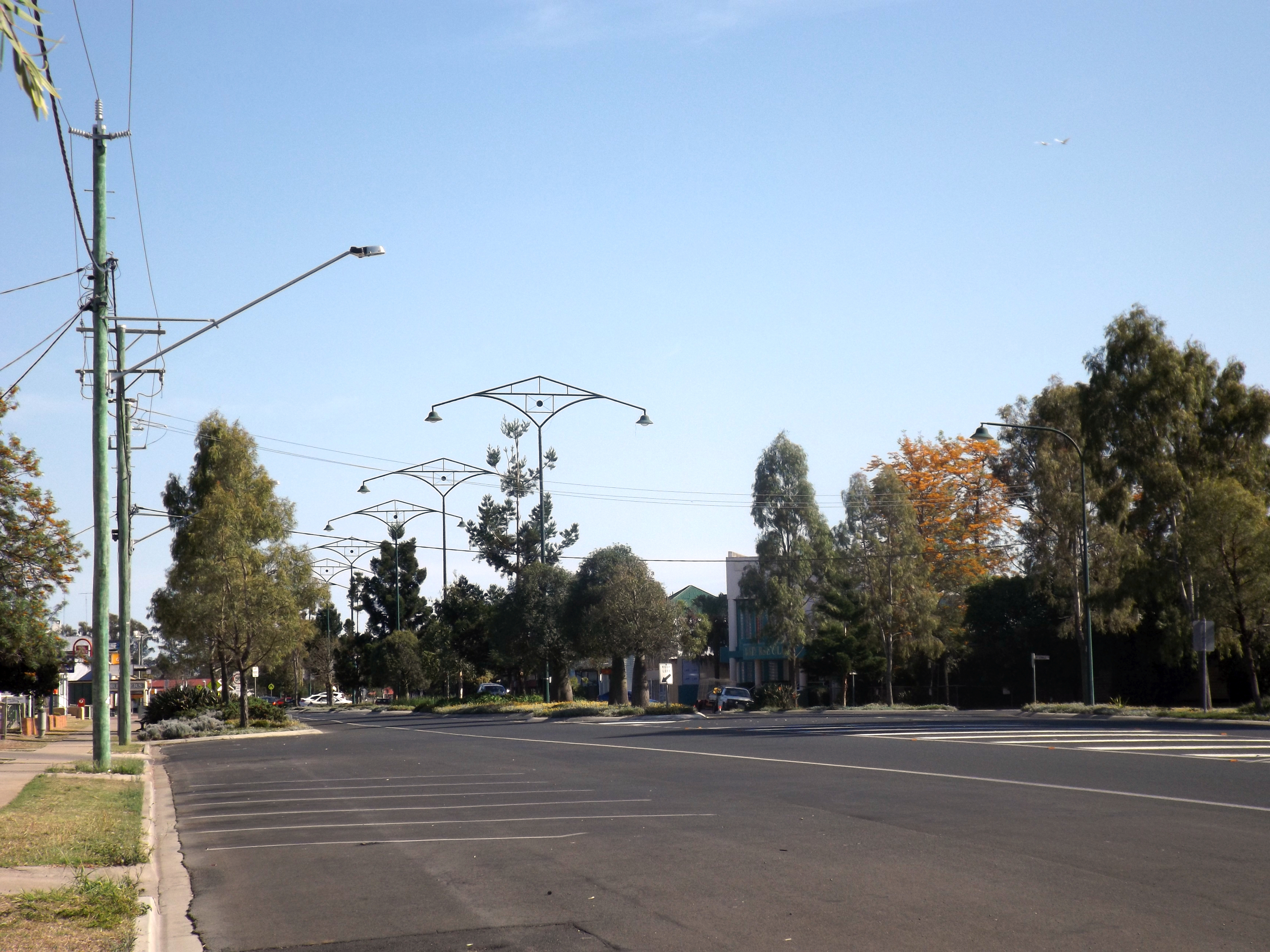
- Campbell Street, 2014

- Coordinates: 27.4338°S 151.7211°E
- Country: Australia
- State: Queensland
- LGA: Toowoomba Region
- Location: 28.0 km (17.4 mi) NW of Toowoomba CBD; 155 km (96 mi) W of Brisbane; 57 km (35 mi) ESE of Dalby; 306 km (190 mi) ESE of Roma; 591 km (367 mi) ESE of Charleville

Government
  - State electorate: Condamine
  - Federal division: Groom

Area
  - Total: 127.1 km^{2} (49.1 sq mi)
- Elevation: 406 m (1,332 ft)

Population
  - Total: 4,756 (2021 census)
  - Density: 37.419/km^{2} (96.92/sq mi)
- Time zone: UTC+10:00 (AEST)
- Postcode: 4401
- Mean max temp: 25.4 °C (77.7 °F)
- Mean min temp: 10.9 °C (51.6 °F)
- Annual rainfall: 628.3 mm (24.74 in)
Localities around Oakey
Jondaryan	Devon Park; Kelvinhaugh	Yalangur
Jondaryan	Oakey	Kings Siding
Jondaryan	Aubigny; Biddeston	Kingsthorpe

Oakey is a rural town and locality in the Toowoomba Region, Queensland, Australia. The Museum of Army Aviation is located at Oakey Airport. In the 2021 census, the locality of Oakey had a population of 4,756 people.

== Geography ==
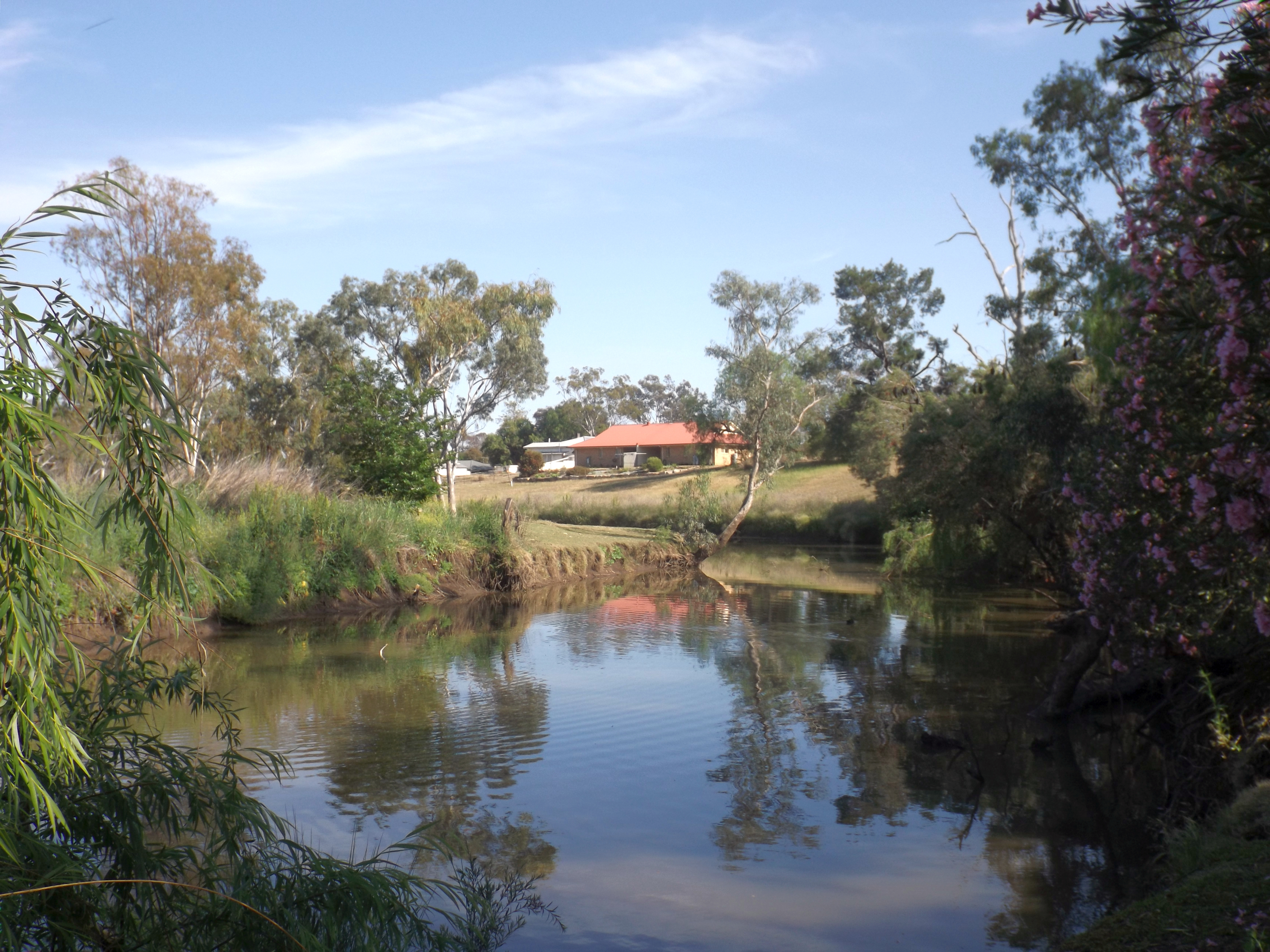
Oakey Creek, 2014

The town is situated on the eastern side of the Darling Downs and the Toowoomba Region local government area. Oakey Creek, a tributary of the Condamine River, passes through the town.

Oakey is one of the towns contained in the Queensland State Electoral district of Condamine and at the federal level it lies within the Division of Groom.

The town is surrounded by farms.

The town is bypassed by the Warrego Highway (National A2). The Western railway line connects Toowoomba with south-western Queensland; it passes through the locality which is served by two railway stations:

- Boolee railway station, on a spur line west of the town (27.4294°S 151.7036°E)
- Oakey railway station, serving the town (27.4311°S 151.7203°E)

Oakey Airport is an airport (27.4126°S 151.7356°E). It is located on the site of the World War 2 airbase. The Oakey Army Aviation Centre is the major user of the airport.

== History ==
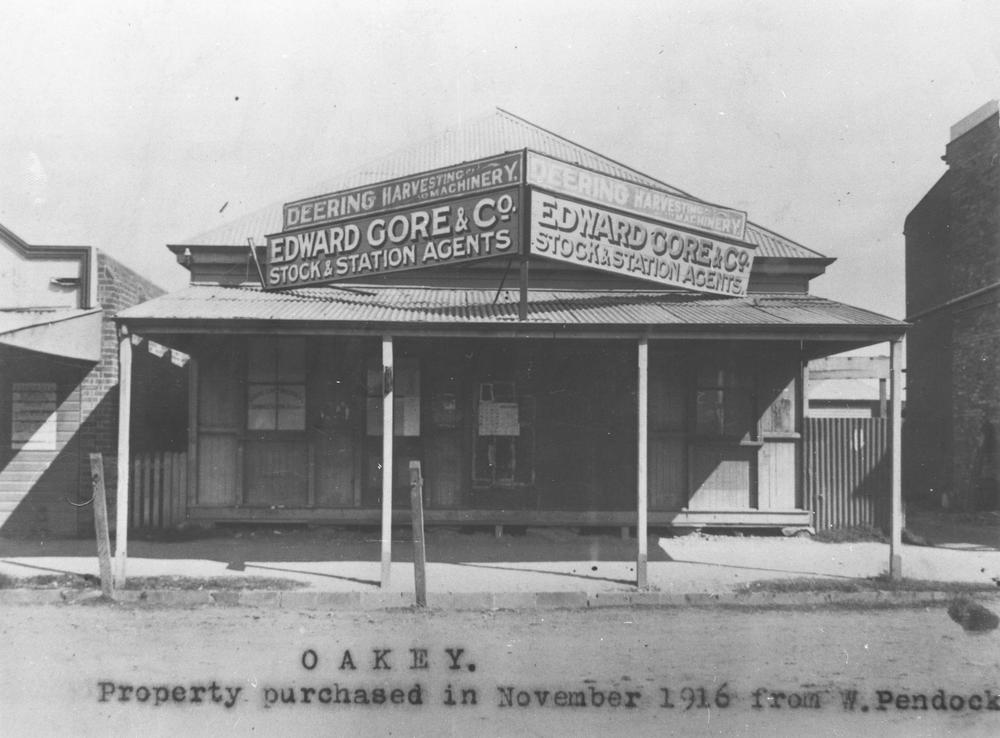
The National Bank in Oakey in 1916

Oakey and the creek around which the town is located were named for the river oaks that dominate the banks of the creek.

=== 19th century ===
The area was first settled in the early 1840s when pastoralists moved into the area and found the land to be suitable for grazing.

In 1859, the Jondaryan Woolshed was built to the west of the town to service the rapidly growing wool industry. The first shearing took place in 1861. The Jondaryan pastoral station dominated the area, encompassing over 400,000 acres (1,600 km^{2}). The woolshed was responsible for over 200,000 head of sheep and could cater for in excess of 50 shearers working simultaneously. Following World War I, the homestead landholding was reduced and separated to allow for soldier settlement programs.

The building of the Western railway line through the area in 1867 prompted the growth of a township to service the pastoral community. Growth of the town was slow, however featured some enterprising ventures, including a short-lived meatworks near the town, which planned to tin and export kangaroo and wallaby under the marketing name 'Australian Game'. The enterprise was unsuccessful and closed down in 1876.

The town was surveyed in 1868, with the first sale being 28 June 1870. Originally named Oaky, the spelling of Oakey was officially adopted in August 1940.

Oakey Creek Post Office opened on 1 June 1869. It was renamed Oakey by 1878.

Oakey Creek Vested School opened on 10 August 1874, with a number of celebrations:

"A grand picnic and ball was held here on the 3rd instant in honor of the opening of the above school. The school-house is a neat weatherboard building, shingled, and with a verandah on each side, and capable of accommodating between sixty and seventy children, and will amply supply the requirements of the district for years to come. The teacher's residence is a smart little four roomed cottage, but I should think rather small. The appointment of Mr. Tait as teacher is sure to give satisfaction."

The school was later renamed Oakey Creek State School. In 1905, it was renamed Oakey State School.

=== 20th century ===
Scots Presbyterian Church opened in 1906. A new church was built in 1957.

St Monica's Catholic Church was opened on Sunday 14 February 1909 by Reverend D. Fouhy. The land was 2.5 acres (1.0 ha) and the church was a Gothic structure, 48 by 25 feet (14.6 by 7.6 m) with 14 feet (4.3 m) walls, capable of seating 200 people. Messrs Marks and Lane were the architects and Mr Andrews was the contractor. The church was enlarged in 1919 to accommodate a school. A new brick church was built in 1957.

The Cooyar railway line serviced the areas to the north of Oakey between 1913 and 1968. Between 1914 and 1984 the area to the southwest was serviced by the Cecil Plains railway line.

St Monica's Catholic School was officially opened on Sunday 26 October 1919 by Archbishop James Duhig. The church building had been enlarged to accommodate both the church and the school.

The Oakey War Memorial in Campbell Street was unveiled on 28 August 1922 by the Governor of Queensland, Sir Matthew Nathan. It was made "of Rockhampton marble on a pedestal of sandstone, with a polished granite centre piece, on which are inscribed in gold letters the names of no fewer than 332 soldiers of the Oakey district who took part in the Great War."

The Country Women's Association opened a branch in Oakey in 1924, which was noted to be 'thriving' in 1925, and celebrated 90 years of activity in 2014.

The racehorse Bernborough was foaled at Rosalie Plains in 1939. He became well-known on the tracks around Toowoomba. Eventually the horse was sold to a businessman in Sydney and raced in three states, winning 15 consecutive races between 22 December 1945 and 19 October 1946.

During World War II, the requirement for aircraft maintenance and construction exceeded the capabilities of Brisbane-based facilities. To expand the capability, a 934-acre (378 ha) site at Oakey was purchased to facilitate the raising of Number 6 Aircraft Depot (6AD). An airbase was sited approximately 2 miles (3 km) north of the town, and runways were built. With a full complement of RAAF personnel, the base housed almost 2,000 troops. The Depot serviced, assembled and conducted test flights of Bristol Beaufort, P-51 Mustang, Norsemen, CAC Wirraway and Supermarine Spitfire aircraft. This airfield became an Army Aviation Training Centre in the 1970s, now Swartz Barracks, a major helicopter pilot and maintenance training facility for the Defence forces.

After the war, the Oakey airport was serviced by Macair Airlines commercial air services originating in Brisbane, however the failure of Macair saw services commenced by Skytrans Airlines being routed via Toowoomba. The establishment of the Wellcamp Airport south of the town, servicing Toowoomba, saw Skytrans being replaced by Qantaslink and REX airlines, and the reduction of airspace for the Army Aviation Centre.

The Oakey Veterinary Hospital was established in 1952.

Oakey State High School opened on 28 January 1964. Since 1916, there was community interest in the establishment of a high school in Oakey, with the disadvantage of "scholars having to reside in Dalby, Warwick, or Toowoomba, after passing the examination" acting as a deterrent to many parents from pursuing higher education for their children. In response to a skills shortage in transport and logistics Oakey State High developed an innovative program called "Transport and Logistics Employees for our Community". In 2007, the successful partnership between school, training organisations and industry was recognised as the winner of the Showcase Award for Excellence in Community or Industry Partnerships by the Department of Education, Training and Employment.

In 1975, Jondaryan Woolshed Historical Museum and Park was established to present the history of Jondaryan Station and its role in the development of pastoralism on the Darling Downs. The woolshed has been in continuous operation since it was built.

Oakey State School celebrated its centenary in 1974.

The Oakey Library opened in 1975 and underwent a major refurbishment in 2014.

On Sunday 31 May 1987, the Oakey Uniting Church was officially opened and dedicated by Reverend Barry Dangerfield, the Queensland Moderator of the Uniting Church in Australia. The hall beside the church was formerly the Maclagan Union Church.

The Oakey Power Station is a 332 MW dual liquid/gas-fired plant and was commissioned in December 1999.

=== 21st century ===
The main town centre was redeveloped during 2005 by the council and now includes new shops, landscaping and tree plantings.

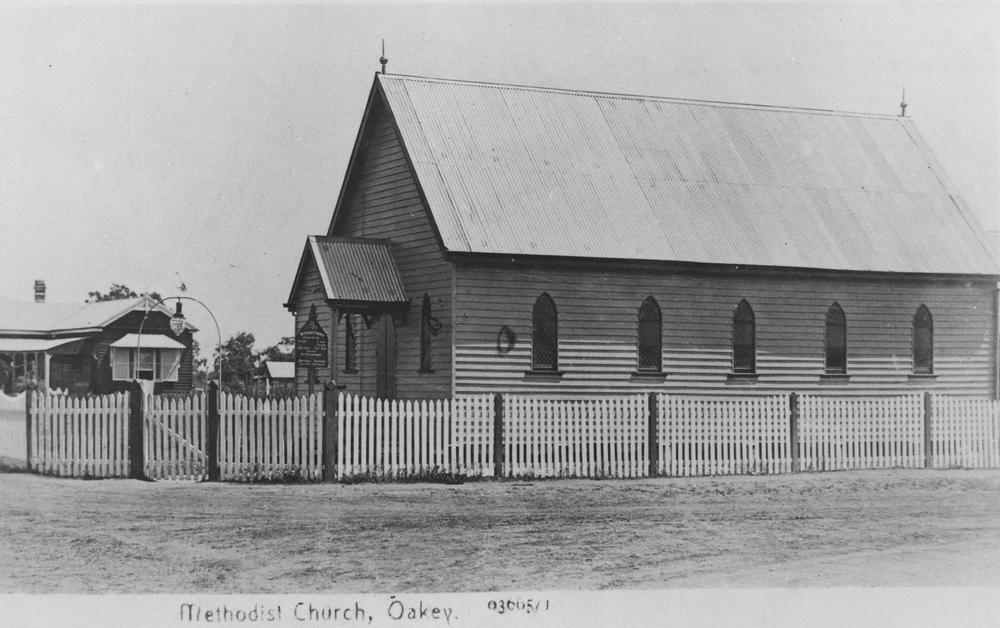
Oakey Methodist Church ca. 1912

In January 2011 the Oakey Creek flooded, impacting 120 homes and businesses. In 2014 a Flood Early Warning System was installed upstream.

In 2014, the Department of Defense investigated a contamination caused by fire-fighting foams used at the Army Aviation Training Centre and warned residents not to drink bore water. The chemicals have been identified as perfluorooctane sulphonate and perfluorooctanoic acid. The chemicals were used from 1970 until 2008. A lack of testing of these chemicals means no conclusive impact on human health has been proven. In 2020, a class action by residents by Oakey, Katherine, and Williamtown (all communities where the fire-fighting foams were used) was successful in establishing that news of the foam contamination had caused property prices in the affected communities to plummet. In December 2021, a 3-year study conducted by the Australian National University announced they did not find conclusive evidence of an increased risk of cancer or other disease because of the contamination.

== Local government administration ==
Oakey has been part of Toowoomba Regional Council since 2008. However, like many small towns in regional Queensland it has been administered by various local government entities over its history.

1. Jondaryan Division (1879–1903)
2. Jondaryan Shire (1903–2008) gaining Gowrie Shire (1903–1913) (part) in 1913, losing part to Millmerran (1913–2008) and Pittsworth (1913–2008) in 1913, gaining Newtown (1913–1917) (part) in 1917, gaining Drayton (1903–1949) (part) in 1949.
3. Toowoomba Region (2008–present)

== Demographics ==
In the 2011 census, the locality of Oakey had a population of 4,529 people.

In the 2016 census, the locality of Oakey had a population of 4,705 people.

In the 2021 census, the locality of Oakey had a population of 4,756 people.

== Economy ==
Industry is rural based, processing livestock and grain. The district has a high concentration of cattle feedlots, an abattoir, a stockfeed manufacturer, grain trading and transport businesses. There is a coal mining operation in the surrounding district, and a business servicing the coal seam gas (CSG) industry farther west.

The township also provides services for agricultural and mining activities in the local area.

The Oakey Veterinary Hospital has a specialist equine reproduction centre.

== Education ==
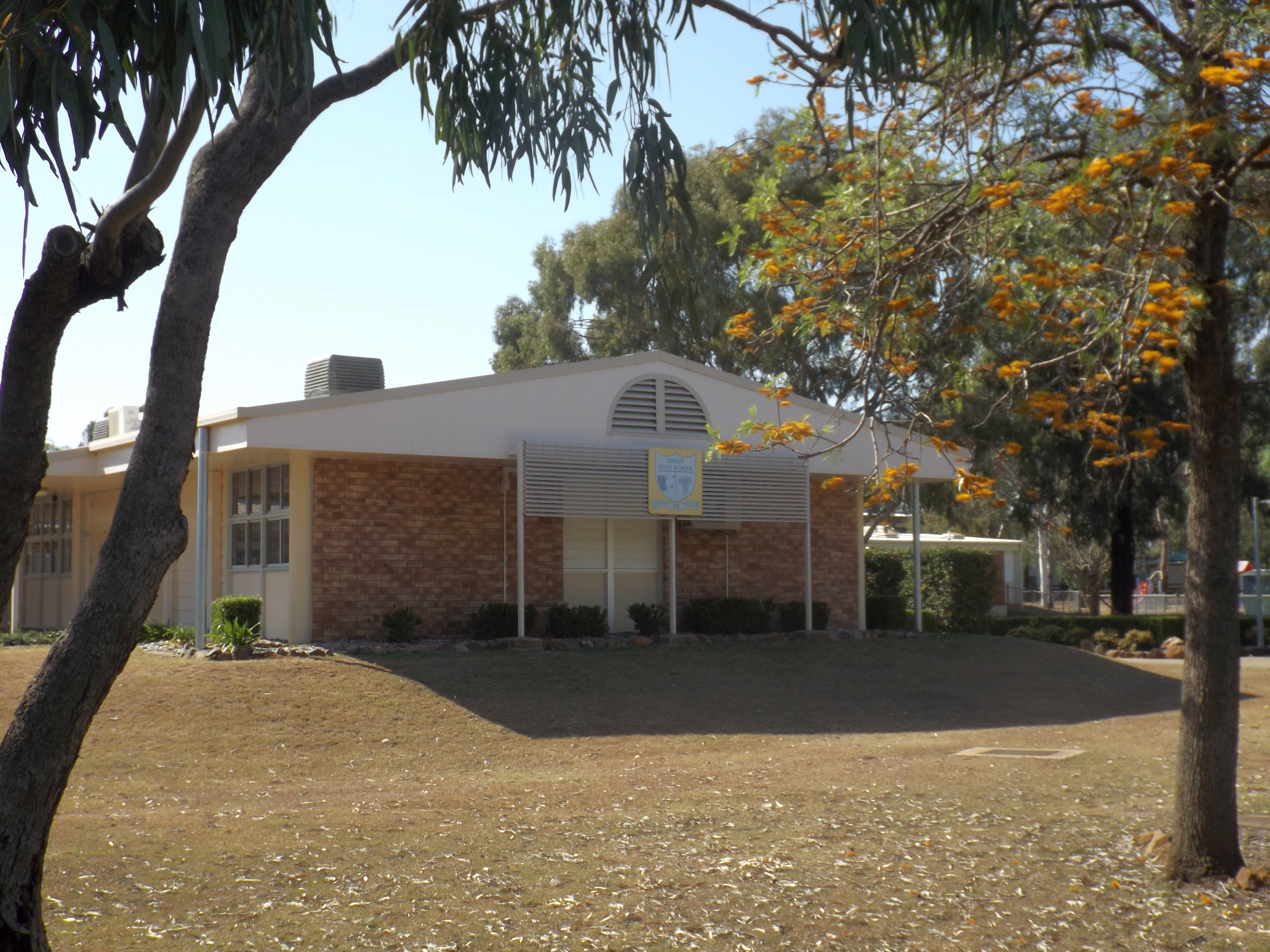
Oakey State School, 2014

Oakey State School is a government primary (Early Childhood to Year 6) school for boys and girls at 24 Campbell Street (27.4393°S 151.7205°E). In 2018, the school had an enrolment of 344 students with 30 teachers (27 full-time equivalent) and 21 non-teaching staff (14 full-time equivalent). It includes a special education program.

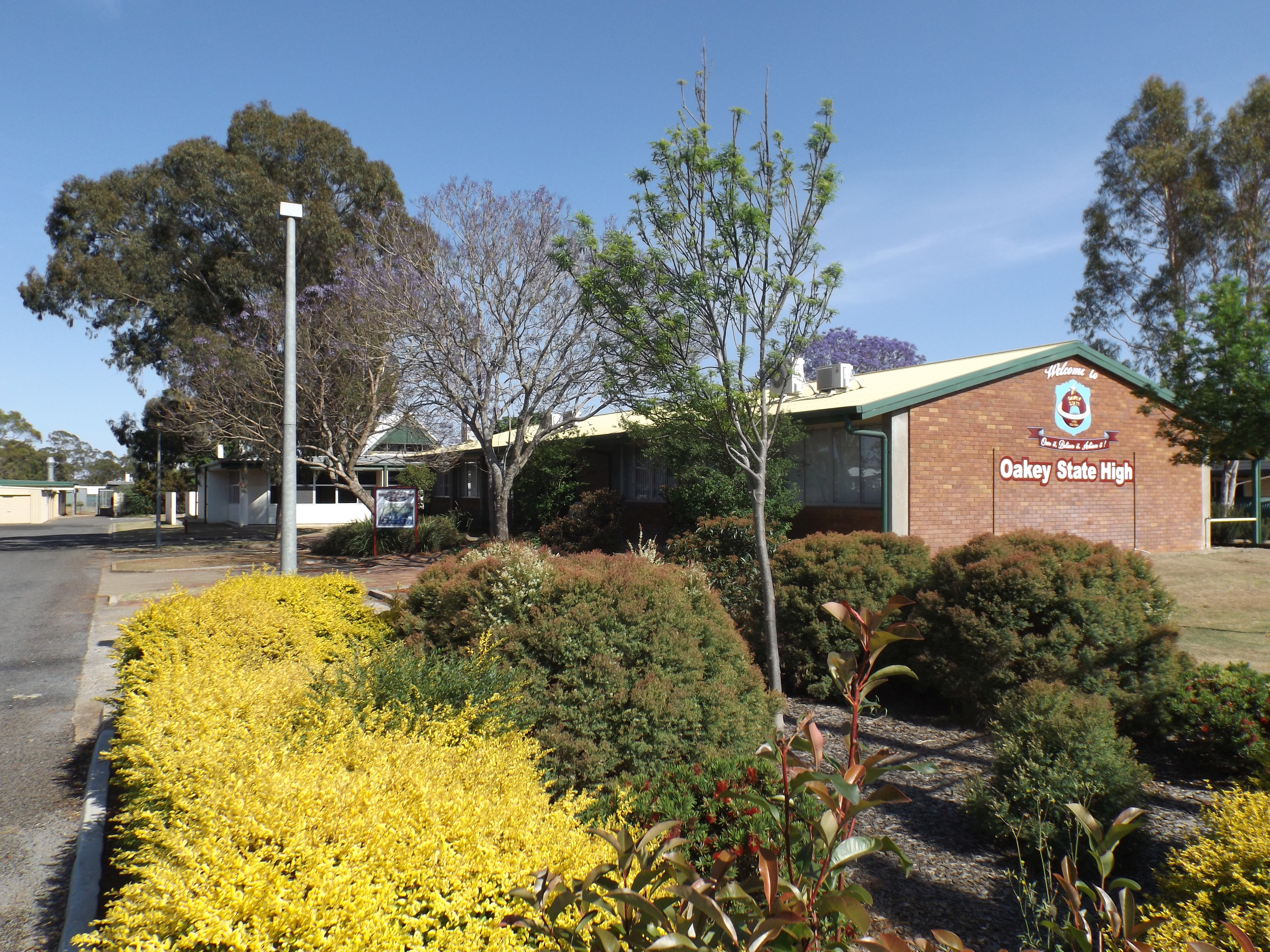
Oakey State High School, 2014

St Monica's School is a Catholic primary (Preparatory to Year 6) school for boys and girls at 75 Lorrimer Street (27.4408°S 151.7193°E). In 2018, the school had an enrolment of 138 students with 12 teachers (10 full-time equivalent) and 12 non-teaching staff (7 full-time equivalent).

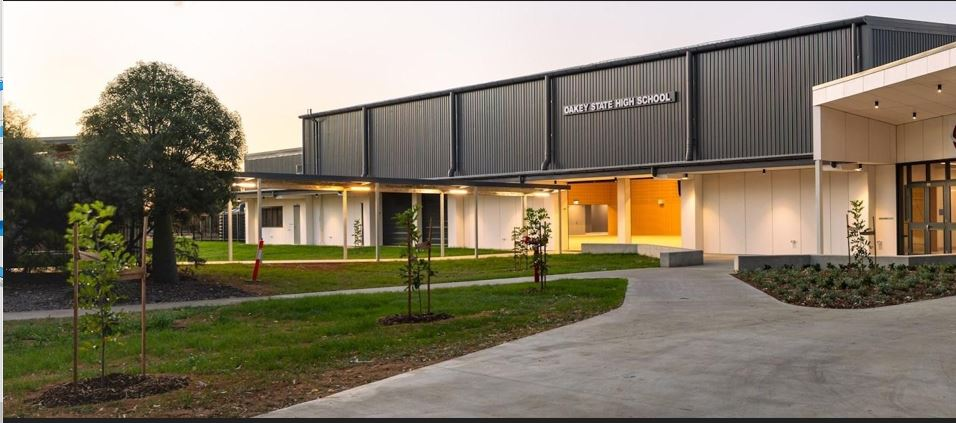
Oakey State High School, 2025

Oakey State High School is a government secondary (7–12) school for boys and girls at 1 Campbell Street (27.4450°S 151.7193°E). In 2018, the school had an enrolment of 454 students with 44 teachers (42 full-time equivalent) and 32 non-teaching staff (23 full-time equivalent). It includes a special education program.

The University of Queensland has a campus for Equine Studies in the town.

== Amenities ==
The township has many amenities, including an Olympic-sized swimming pool and golf course. The golf course is located at the corner of the Warrego Highway and Mount Tyson Road.

The local RSL (Returned Services League) Club provides convention style facilities, and is the hub of the war remembrance activities for the local area on Anzac Day and Remembrance Day.

The town has well established daycare and pre-school centres.

Oakey has a local hospital providing emergency services and inpatient care as well as a large co-located nursing home facility known as the EAF McDonald nursing home. There are two private GP practices in the town.

The Oakey Library is located in the Oakey Civic Precinct at 60 Campbell Street between the swimming pool and the Community Centre. It boasts a 500-seat capacity Cultural Centre, and two multi-purpose sports halls at the two primary schools.

Oakey has a number of churches, including:

- St Monica's Catholic Church, 19 Campbell Street
- Oakey Uniting Church, 13 Cherry Street
- Scots Oakey Presbyterian Church, 4 Connelly Lane

The Oakey branch of the Queensland Country Women's Association meets at the Kenmore Library at the Anglican Church Hall at 5 Creek Street.

== Attractions ==
The Museum of Army Aviation is located at the airport. It displays aircraft and memorabilia dating from World War I to the present.

== Climate ==
Oakey's climate varies through the year, ranging from hot, humid and stormy summers to cool, dry and sunny winters. Oakey frequently records temperatures below 0 °C, often approaching −5 °C in winter and above 35 °C in summer, occasionally rising to above 40 °C. Its lowest recorded temperature is −7.5 °C (18.5 °F) and its highest recorded temperature is 42.8 °C (107.2 °F).

Climate data for Oakey (Oakey Aero 1970–current)
Month	Jan	Feb	Mar	Apr	May	Jun	Jul	Aug	Sep	Oct	Nov	Dec	Year
Record high °C (°F)	41.8 (107.2)	42.8 (109.0)	38.7 (101.7)	35.0 (95.0)	31.6 (88.9)	29.9 (85.8)	27.1 (80.8)	34.4 (93.9)	37.4 (99.3)	38.1 (100.6)	39.8 (103.6)	40.7 (105.3)	42.8 (109.0)
Mean daily maximum °C (°F)	31.1 (88.0)	30.2 (86.4)	28.7 (83.7)	25.9 (78.6)	22.3 (72.1)	19.2 (66.6)	18.7 (65.7)	20.7 (69.3)	24.2 (75.6)	26.9 (80.4)	28.9 (84.0)	30.4 (86.7)	25.6 (78.1)
Mean daily minimum °C (°F)	18.0 (64.4)	17.7 (63.9)	16.0 (60.8)	11.8 (53.2)	7.8 (46.0)	4.2 (39.6)	3.0 (37.4)	3.7 (38.7)	7.3 (45.1)	11.4 (52.5)	14.5 (58.1)	16.7 (62.1)	11.0 (51.8)
Record low °C (°F)	9.2 (48.6)	8.6 (47.5)	2.3 (36.1)	−1.1 (30.0)	−5.7 (21.7)	−6.9 (19.6)	−7.2 (19.0)	−7.5 (18.5)	−4.1 (24.6)	−2.2 (28.0)	2.0 (35.6)	5.8 (42.4)	−7.5 (18.5)
Average rainfall mm (inches)	78.3 (3.08)	79.9 (3.15)	55.0 (2.17)	30.1 (1.19)	39.8 (1.57)	28.9 (1.14)	28.5 (1.12)	24.9 (0.98)	29.0 (1.14)	57.1 (2.25)	74.5 (2.93)	90.4 (3.56)	616.4 (24.28)
Average rainy days (≥ 0.2mm)	8.4	7.1	7.0	5.2	6.1	6.1	6.0	4.7	5.1	7.3	8.1	8.8	79.9
Source: Bureau of Meteorology
