= Dalby–Cecil Plains Road =

Road in Queensland, Australia

Dalby–Cecil Plains Road Queensland

General information
- Type: Rural road
- Length: 39.1 km (24 mi)
- Route number(s): State Route 82 (Dalby – Cecil Plains)

Major junctions
- North end: Warrego Highway Dalby
- Springvale Road; Jondaryan–St Ruth Road
- South end: Toowoomba–Cecil Plains Road Cecil Plains; Millmerran–Cecil Plains Road (Taylor Street)

Dalby–Cecil Plains Road is a continuous 39.1 kilometres (24.3 mi) road route in the Western Downs and Toowoomba regions of Queensland, Australia. The road is signed as State Route 82. Dalby–Cecil Plains Road (number 325) is a state-controlled regional road.

== Route Description ==
The Dalby–Cecil Plains Road commences at an intersection with the Warrego Highway (A2) in Dalby. It runs south through St Ruth and Tipton before turning south-west into Cecil Plains. It ends at an intersection with Toowoomba–Cecil Plains Road, which runs east as State Route 82, and Taylor Street, which runs west to become Millmerran–Cecil Plains Road.

In St Ruth it passes exits to Springvale Road and Jondaryan–St Ruth Road, which combine to provide an alternative route from the Warrego Highway to the Moonie Highway. Land use along Dalby–Cecil Plains Road is almost exclusively crop farming. Within Cecil Plains the road follows the Condamine River.

== Road condition ==
Dalby–Cecil Plains Road is fully sealed. The steepest incline on the road is only about 2%.

== State Route 82 ==
State Route 82 follows a number of separately named roads from Tingoora (near Wondai) to Inglewood. It is not necessarily the best or the shortest or the quickest route between the two termini. It was proclaimed as a State Route because, at the time, it was the most convenient route for many users. It is also an example of why motorists in unfamiliar territory should follow a designated route rather than rely on a vehicle navigation system, which may direct them onto less suitable alternative roads. For example, the route from Tingoora to Inglewood suggested by a popular mapping system is quite different to State Route 82.

The route follows Chinchilla–Wondai Road west from Tingoora to Durong, where it turns south to Jinghi. Here the Chinchilla–Wondai Road turns west, while State Route 82 continues south on Jandowae Connection Road to Jandowae. In Jandowae the road name changes to Dalby–Jandowae Road, which continues to the Warrego Highway in the west of Dalby. From there it follows the Warrego Highway to the south-east until it reaches Dalby–Cecil Plains Road, where it continues south.

At a T-junction in Cecil Plains, State Route 82 turns east on Toowoomba–Cecil Plains Road until it reaches Pampas–Horrane Road, (Note: Horrane was a station on the former Cecil Plains railway line. It was situated adjacent to the intersection of Toowoomba–Cecil Plains Road and Pampas–Horrane Road in the locality of Cecil Plains.) where it turns south. Note that many navigation systems will suggest a turn to the west in Cecil Plains, leading to Millmerran–Cecil Plains Road. State Route 82 follows Pampas–Horrane Road to Pampas, where it meets the Gore Highway at a T-junction. From there it follows the Gore Highway south-west to Millmerran, where it turns south on the Millmerran–Inglewood Road. This road continues south to Inglewood where it meets the Cunningham Highway at a T-junction.

== History ==
The Dalby area was settled in the 1840s, and a township was surveyed in 1853 and founded in 1854. A post office opened in 1855 and a school in 1861. The railway arrived in 1868, allowing the town to grow as the commercial centre for properties around it.

The first roads on the Darling Downs were cut to provide access for wheeled vehicles to the pastoral runs and new settlements.

Cecil Plains pastoral run was established in 1842. St Ruth pastoral run, initially part of Cecil Plains, was separated in 1842. In 1877 8,300 acres (3,400 ha) was resumed from the Cecil Plains pastoral run and 9,000 acres (3,600 ha) from St Ruth, to establish smaller farms. This resumption soon led to closer settlement and a demand for better roads to enable the commercial success of the new farms.

A postal receiving office opened in Cecil Plains in 1890, and the first school in 1898. Over time the areas along the line of road from Cecil Plains to Dalby were settled as farms of various sizes. In 1916, Cecil Plains station was acquired by the Queensland government and subdivided for closer settlement, with some parcels reserved for soldier settlers. The new settlers produced mainly wheat and dairy.

A reliable road connection to Dalby, which is the closest larger town, and was the closest railhead until 1919, was needed to provide access to markets and larger items of equipment.

== Major intersections ==
All distances are from Google Maps.

LGA	Location	km	mi	Destinations	Notes
Western Downs	Dalby	0	0.0	Warrego Highway (A2) – southeast – Oakey, Toowoomba – northwest – Macalister, Chinchilla	Northern end of Dalby–Cecil Plains Road. Road runs south as State Route 82.
Western Downs	St Ruth	18.5	11.5	Springvale Road – west – Springvale, Nandi, Moonie Highway	
Western Downs	St Ruth	20.1	12.5	Jondaryan–St Ruth Road – east – Jondaryan, Warrego Highway	
Toowoomba	Cecil Plains	39.1	24.3	Toowoomba–Cecil Plains Road (State Route 82) – east – Toowoomba; Millmerran–Cecil Plains Road (Taylor Street) – west, then south – Millmerran	Southern end of Dalby–Cecil Plains Road
1.000 mi = 1.609 km; 1.000 km = 0.621 mi

== See also ==
- List of road routes in Queensland
- List of numbered roads in Queensland
