= Formartin, Queensland =

Formartin
- Suburb
- Interactive map of Formartin
- Coordinates: 27.37°S 151.4313°E
- Country: Australia
- State: Queensland
- LGA: Toowoomba Region
- Location: 32.8 km (20.4 mi) W of Oakey; 41.3 km (25.7 mi) SE of Dalby; 58.9 km (36.6 mi) NW of Toowoomba CBD; 189 km (117 mi) W of Brisbane

Government
  - State electorate: Condamine
  - Federal division: Groom

Area
  - Total: 132.9 km^{2} (51.3 sq mi)

Population
  - Total: 89 (2021 census)
  - Density: 0.670/km^{2} (1.734/sq mi)
- Time zone: UTC+10:00 (AEST)
- Postcode: 4404
Suburbs around Formartin
Bowenville	Wainui	Bowenville
St Ruth	Formartin	Jondaryan
West Prairie	West Prairie	West Prairie

Formartin is a rural locality in the Toowoomba Region, Queensland, Australia. In the 2021 census, Formartin had a population of 89 people.

== Geography ==
The locality is partly bounded to the north and north-east by Oakey Creek. The creek is a tributary of the Condamine River and part of the Murray-Darling basin.

The land use is crop growing with irrigation in use in the north and east of the locality, taking advantage of the creek.

== History ==
Formartin State School opened on 4 October 1948 and officially closed on 9 December 1988. The school was at 1538 Jondaryan St Ruth Road (27.3952°S 151.4090°E).

== Demographics ==
In the 2016 census, Formartin had a population of 95 people.

In the 2021 census, Formartin had a population of 89 people.

== Economy ==
There are a number of homesteads in the locality, including:

- Avalyn (27.3935°S 151.3547°E)
- Avondale (27.3982°S 151.3716°E)
- Bandawing (27.3350°S 151.3965°E)
- Baroona (27.3860°S 151.4153°E)
- Brigadoon (27.3543°S 151.3984°E)
- Cameron Downs (27.3957°S 151.3436°E)
- Cardwell (27.3749°S 151.4200°E)
- Coolooli (27.3767°S 151.4539°E)
- Dennis Downs (27.3798°S 151.3473°E)
- Double Eight (27.3959°S 151.4619°E)
- Ellerslie (27.3501°S 151.3785°E)
- Formartin (27.3925°S 151.4077°E)
- Kaen (27.3802°S 151.4142°E)
- Kantara (27.3616°S 151.4648°E)
- Nunkeri (27.3854°S 151.3804°E)
- Struanville (27.3565°S 151.3508°E)
- The Three Mile (27.3762°S 151.5213°E)
- Wanganui (27.3521°S 151.4123°E)
- Wyeera (27.3640°S 151.3770°E)

== Education ==
There are no schools in Formartin. The nearest government primary schools are Bowenville State School in neighboring Bowenville to the north-east, Jondaryan State School in neighboring Jondaryan to the east, and Dalby South State School in Dalby to the north-west. The nearest government secondary schools are Cecil Plains State School (to Year 9) in Cecil Plains to the south-west, Dalby State High School (to Year 12) in Dalby to the north-west, and Oakey State High School (to Year 12) in Oakey to the east.
