= St Ruth, Queensland =

St Ruth
- Suburb
- Interactive map of St Ruth
- Coordinates: 27.3169°S 151.2572°E
- Country: Australia
- State: Queensland
- LGAs: Western Downs Region; Toowoomba Region
- Location: 23.5 km (14.6 mi) S of Dalby; 76.7 km (47.7 mi) WNW of Toowoomba; 203 km (126 mi) W of Brisbane

Government
  - State electorates: Warrego; Condamine
  - Federal divisions: Maranoa; Groom

Area
  - Total: 218.1 km^{2} (84.2 sq mi)

Population
  - Total: 165 (2021 census)
  - Density: 0.7565/km^{2} (1.959/sq mi)
- Time zone: UTC+10:00 (AEST)
- Postcode: 4405
Suburbs around St Ruth
Nandi	Dalby	Bowenville
Springvale	St Ruth	Formartin
Cecil Plains	Tipton	West Prairie

St Ruth is a locality split between the Western Downs Region and the Toowoomba Region in Queensland, Australia. In the 2021 census, St Ruth had a population of 165 people.

== Geography ==
The Dalby–Cecil Plains Road (State Route 82) runs through from north to south.

== History ==
The locality was originally called St Ruth's after the parish name which was in turn named after the St Ruth's pastoral run taken up as part of Cecil Plains pastoral run by Henry Stuart Russell in 1842. It was separated from Cecil Plains in 1842 by Richard Jones, probably for the Aberdeen Company. Later the name was simplified to be St Ruth.

In 1877, 9,000 acres (3,600 ha) of land was resumed from the St Ruth pastoral run to establish smaller farms. The land was offered for selection on 24 April 1877.

St Ruth Provisional School opened circa 1888. In 1918, it became a half-time school in conjunction with West Prairie Provisional School (meaning the schools shared a single teacher). In 1919, it returned to full-time school status but then closed in 1920.

== Demographics ==
In the 2016 census, St Ruth had a population of 139 people.

In the 2021 census, St Ruth had a population of 165 people.

== Education ==
There are no schools in St Ruth. The nearest government primary schools are Dalby South State School and Dalby State School, both in neighbouring Dalby to the north, and Cecil Plains State School in neighbouring Cecil Plains to the south-west. The nearest government secondary schools are Cecil Plains State School (to Year 9) and Dalby State High School (to Year 12) in Dalby.
