= Wainui, Queensland =

Wainui
- Suburb
- Interactive map of Wainui
- Coordinates: 27.3294°S 151.4605°E
- Country: Australia
- State: Queensland
- LGA: Toowoomba Region
- Location: 4.4 km (2.7 mi) SW of Bowenville; 31 km (19 mi) SE of Dalby; 59 km (37 mi) NW of Toowoomba; 187 km (116 mi) WNW of Brisbane

Government
  - State electorate: Condamine
  - Federal division: Groom

Area
  - Total: 10.0 km^{2} (3.9 sq mi)

Population
  - Total: 8 (2021 census)
  - Density: 0.80/km^{2} (2.07/sq mi)
- Time zone: UTC+10:00 (AEST)
- Postcode: 4404
Suburbs around Wainui
Bowenville	Bowenville	Bowenville
Formartin	Wainui	Bowenville
Formartin	Formartin	Formartin

Wainui is a rural locality in the Toowoomba Region, Queensland, Australia. In the 2021 census, Wainui had a population of 8 people.

== Geography ==
Wainui is a relatively small locality sandwiched between the much larger localities of Bowenville to the north and east and Formartin to the south-west.

Oakey Creek enters the locality from the east (Bowenville/ Formartin) and forms part of the north-eastern boundary of the locality, then flows west through the locality, exiting to the west to Bowenville.

The North Australian Pastoral Company operate a feedlot in the north-west of the locality. Apart from this, the land use is a mix of crop growing and grazing on native vegetation.

== Demographics ==
In the 2016 census, Wainui had "no people or a very low population".

In the 2021 census, Wainui had a population of 8 people.

== Education ==
There are no schools in Wainui. The nearest government primary school is Bowenville State School in neighbouring Bowenville to the north-east. The nearest government secondary school is Dalby State High School in Dalby to the north-west. There are also non-government schools in Dalby and in Toowoomba and its suburbs.
