= Blaxland, Queensland =

Blaxland
- Suburb
- Interactive map of Blaxland
- Coordinates: 27.2186°S 151.4002°E
- Country: Australia
- State: Queensland
- LGA: Western Downs Region
- Location: 15.6 km (9.7 mi) E of Dalby; 73.4 km (45.6 mi) NW of Toowoomba; 201 km (125 mi) WNW of Brisbane

Government
  - State electorate: Warrego
  - Federal division: Maranoa

Area
  - Total: 95.6 km^{2} (36.9 sq mi)
- Elevation: 360 m (1,180 ft)

Population
  - Total: 58 (2021 census)
  - Density: 0.607/km^{2} (1.571/sq mi)
- Time zone: UTC+10:00 (AEST)
- Postcode: 4405
Suburbs around Blaxland
Irvingdale	Irvingdale	Irvingdale
Dalby	Blaxland	Bowenville
Bowenville	Bowenville	Bowenville

Blaxland is a rural locality in the Western Downs Region, Queensland, Australia. In the 2021 census, Blaxland had a population of 58 people.

== Geography ==
The Western railway line forms the southern boundary of the locality, while Myall Creek forms the northern boundary.

The land is flat and predominantly used for crop growing.

== History ==
In the 1860s, Edward James Blaxland purchased land originally known as Three Mile Scrub and named the property Blaxland. When the Western railway line reached the area in 1868, the railway station was called Blaxland as was this locality. Despite the name, the Blaxland railway station is not within the current boundaries of the Blaxland locality, but within the boundaries of neighbouring Dalby.

== Demographics ==
In the 2016 census, Blaxland had a population of 35 people.

In the 2021 census, Blaxland had a population of 58 people.

== Education ==
There are no schools in Blaxland. The nearest government primary schools are Dalby State School in neighbouring Dalby to the west and Bowenville State School in neighbouring Bowenville to the east. The nearest government secondary school is Dalby State High School in Dalby.
