= Tipton, Queensland =

Tipton
- Suburb
- Interactive map of Tipton
- Coordinates: 27.4636°S 151.2583°E
- Country: Australia
- State: Queensland
- LGA: Toowoomba Region
- Location: 8.4 km (5.2 mi) NE of Cecil Plains; 37.7 km (23.4 mi) S of Dalby; 79.0 km (49.1 mi) W of Toowoomba CBD; 209 km (130 mi) W of Brisbane

Government
  - State electorates: Condamine; Southern Downs
  - Federal divisions: Groom; Maranoa

Area
  - Total: 51.7 km^{2} (20.0 sq mi)

Population
  - Total: 37 (2021 census)
  - Density: 0.716/km^{2} (1.854/sq mi)
- Time zone: UTC+10:00 (AEST)
- Postcode: 4405
Suburbs around Tipton
Springvale	St Ruth	St Ruth
Cecil Plains	Tipton	West Prairie
Cecil Plains	Cecil Plains	Nangwee

Tipton is a rural locality in the Toowoomba Region, Queensland, Australia. In the 2021 census, Tipton had a population of 37 people.

== Geography ==
The Condamine River (North Branch) enters the locality in the south-east (Nangwee) and the southern and south-western boundary of the locality loosely follows its meandering flow, until its confluence with the main branch of the Condamine River, after which the river forms the western and north-western boundary of the locality, before exiting to the north-west (Springvale / St Ruth).

Dalby–Cecil Plains Road enters the locality from the north (St Ruth) and exits to the west (Cecil Plains).

The land use is predominantly crop growing with some grazing on native vegetation.

== History ==
The locality was named after a small village in England.

Tipton Provisional School opened on 4 August 1884. It closed circa 1898 due to insufficient student numbers, but had reopened by 1904. On 1 January 1909, it became Tipton State School. It closed on 31 October 1911. In 1919, tenders were called for the sale and removal of the school building In 1928, local people began to campaign for a school, resulting in the purchase of a 5-acre (2.0 ha) site and the relocation of the Edgefield State School building from Irvingdale. Tipton State School re-opened on 1 April 1929. It closed permanently on 19 September 1948. It was on a 5-acre (2.0 ha) site on the western side of Dalby Cecil Plains Road (approx 27.43077°S 151.25720°E).

== Demographics ==
In the 2016 census, Tipton had a population of 39 people.

In the 2021 census, Tipton had a population of 37 people.

== Education ==
There are no schools in Tipton. The nearest government school is Cecil Plains State School (Prep to Year 9) in Cecil Plains to the south-west. For schooling to Year 12, the nearest government school is Dalby State High School in Dalby to the north.
