= Bowenville, Queensland =

Bowenville
- Town
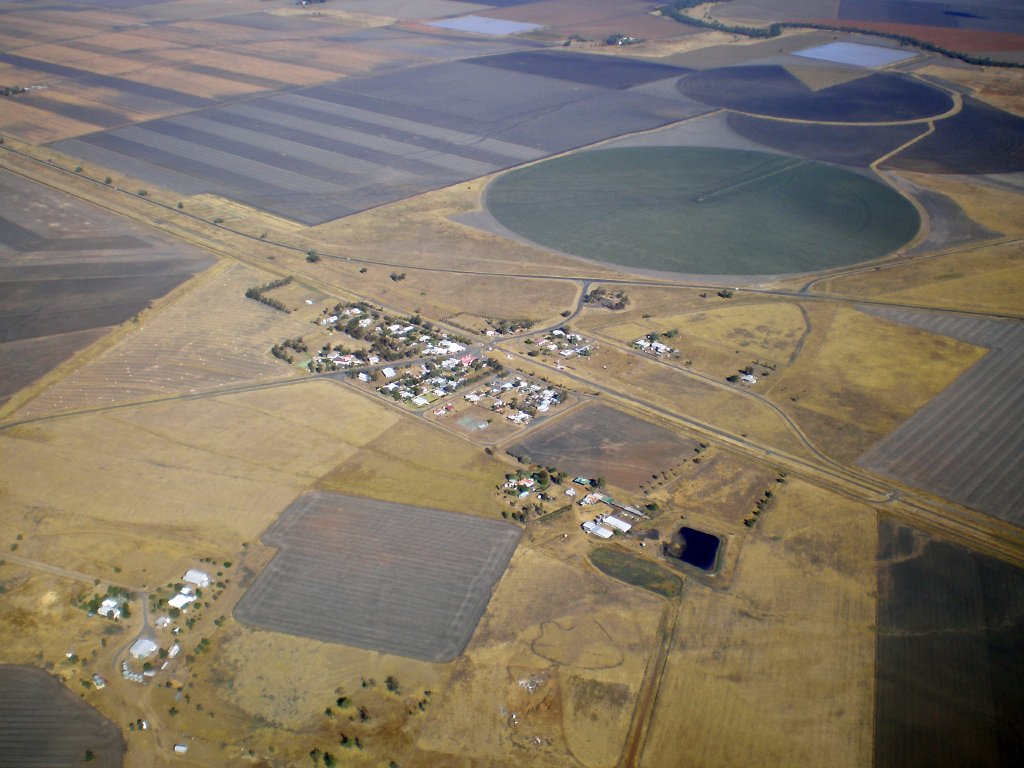
- Bowenville looking southwards, May 2010

- Interactive map of Bowenville
- Coordinates: 27.3041°S 151.4925°E
- Country: Australia
- State: Queensland
- LGA: Toowoomba Region
- Location: 28.3 km (17.6 mi) SE of Dalby; 55.9 km (34.7 mi) NW of Toowoomba CBD; 183 km (114 mi) WNW of Brisbane
- Established: 1890 (approx.)

Government
  - State electorate: Condamine
  - Federal division: Maranoa

Area
  - Total: 297.8 km^{2} (115.0 sq mi)

Population
  - Total: 219 (2021 census)
  - Density: 0.7354/km^{2} (1.905/sq mi)
- Time zone: UTC+10:00 (AEST)
- Postcode: 4404
Localities around Bowenville
Blaxland	Irvingdale	Brymaroo
Dalby	Bowenville	Malu
St Ruth	Formartin; Wainui	Jondaryan

Bowenville is a rural town and locality in the Toowoomba Region, Queensland, Australia. The town's economy rested on the rail industry and with the winding down of the railways the population declined. In the 2021 census, the locality of Bowenville had a population of 219 people.

== Geography ==
Just north of the Warrego Highway east of Dalby, Bowenville has the basic requirements for the traveler, including fuel, a post office, barbecues, a hotel and a public telephone. It is a short drive from two major tourist attractions in the region, the historic Jondaryan Woolshed and the New Acland Coal Mine.

The Western railway line passes through the locality with Bowenville railway station (27.3041°S 151.4906°E) serving the town. Further west of the town are three other railway stations on the line:

- Auchmah railway station, now closed (27.2638°S 151.4266°E)
- Koomi railway station (27.2525°S 151.4086°E)
- Kommamurra railway station (27.2312°S 151.3750°E)

== History ==
Bowen Provisional School opened on 21 June 1898. It became Bowenville State School on 1 January 1909. In 1921, the school was located south-west of the railway line near Blaxland Road (approx 27.30284°S 151.48782°E). In 1951, a site of just over 7 acres (2.8 ha) on the corner of Irvingdale and Grant Streets was reserved as a new site for the Bowenville school. A new school was built in 1953, opening in 1954 (this is the current school).

In September 1906, Major William Grant of the Bowenville pastoral station donated land next to the railway line on the corner of Railway Street and Cockburn Street (27.3032°S 151.4904°E) for a Presbyterian church as well as £20 towards the building costs. John Nicholson of Blaxlands pastoral station donated a further £10. The construction of the church was completed in September 1909. The church was officially opened on Friday 22 October 1909 by Eveline Grant, wife of William Grant. The church was designed by Alexander Brown Wilson of Brisbane and built by D.A. Mever of Toowoomba. It had a cedar pulpit and leadlight windows. The first divine service was held on Sunday 24 October 1909 by Reverend George Tulloch.

Bowenville Post Office opened by June 1908 (a receiving office had been open from 1878).

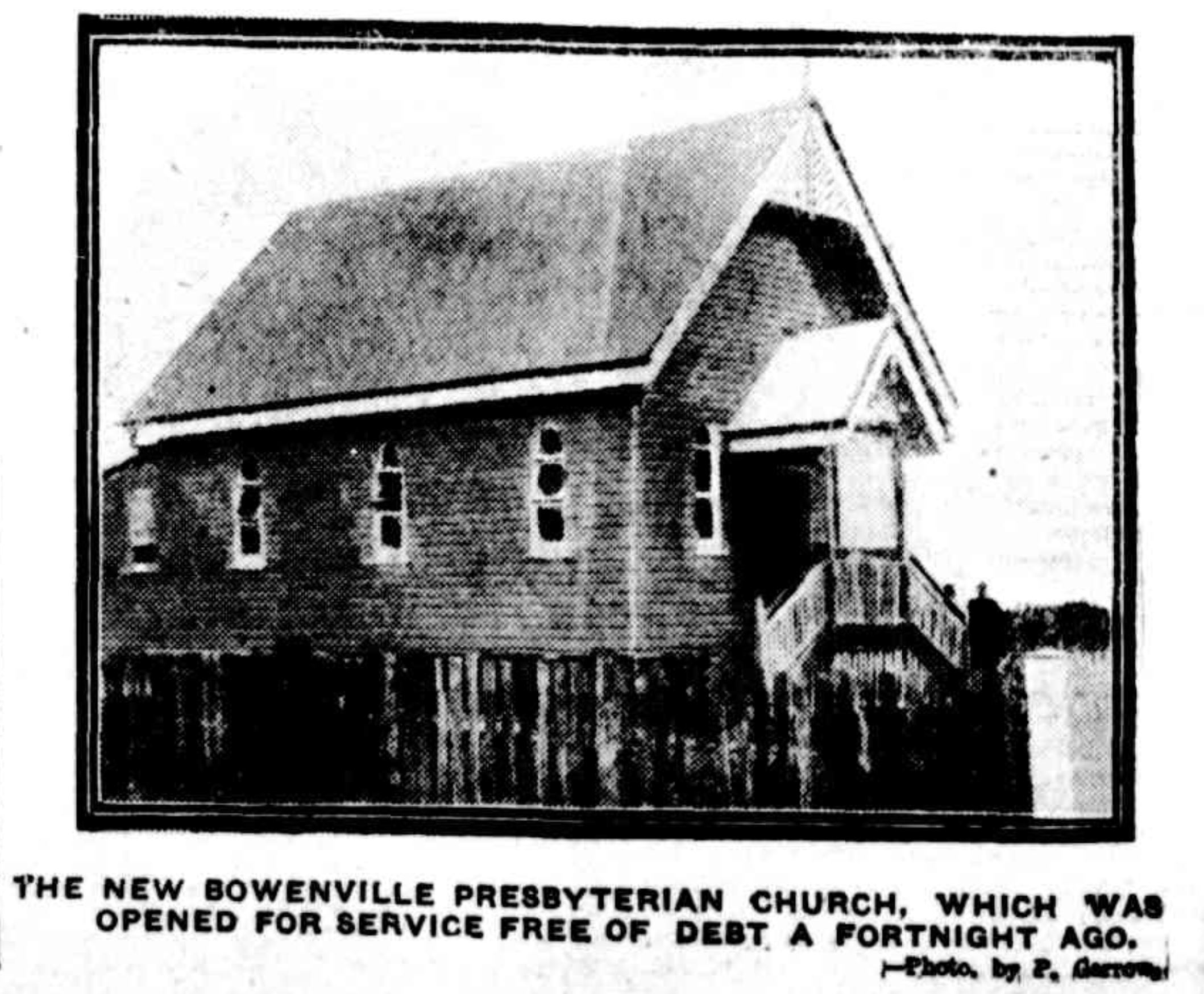
The re-built Bowenville Presbyterian Church, 1916

In March 1916, a severe storm blew the roof off the Presbyterian church as well as damaging the Bowenville railway station and many houses. The remains of the church were auctioned off and the church rebuilt at a cost of £200 by carpenter Thomas Hodge of Dalby. Many suppliers and tradesmen donated their goods and services. The Dalby Presbyterian Church provided a new organ. On Sunday 13 August 1916 the re-built church was officially re-opened by the Reverend Richard Glaister, the principal of Emmanuel College at the University of Queensland.

The Bowenville Public Hall was built in 1925. It was a popular venue for dancers as its floor was made of crow's ash (Flindersia australis) which is very resistant to impact, making it an excellent surface for dancing. The hall was later extended with materials recycled from the public hall at Irvingdale when it closed. The hall hosts a wide variety of local events, including meetings, classes, dances, concerts, and receptions. The local branch of the Queensland Country Women's Association met in this hall.

St Luke's Anglican Church was dedicated on 30 March 1952 by Venerable Frank Knight. It had been relocated from Ducklo. It closed on 31 March 1982.

== Demographics ==
In the 2016 census, the locality of Bowenville had a population of 250 people.

In the 2021 census, the locality of Bowenville had a population of 219 people.

== Education ==
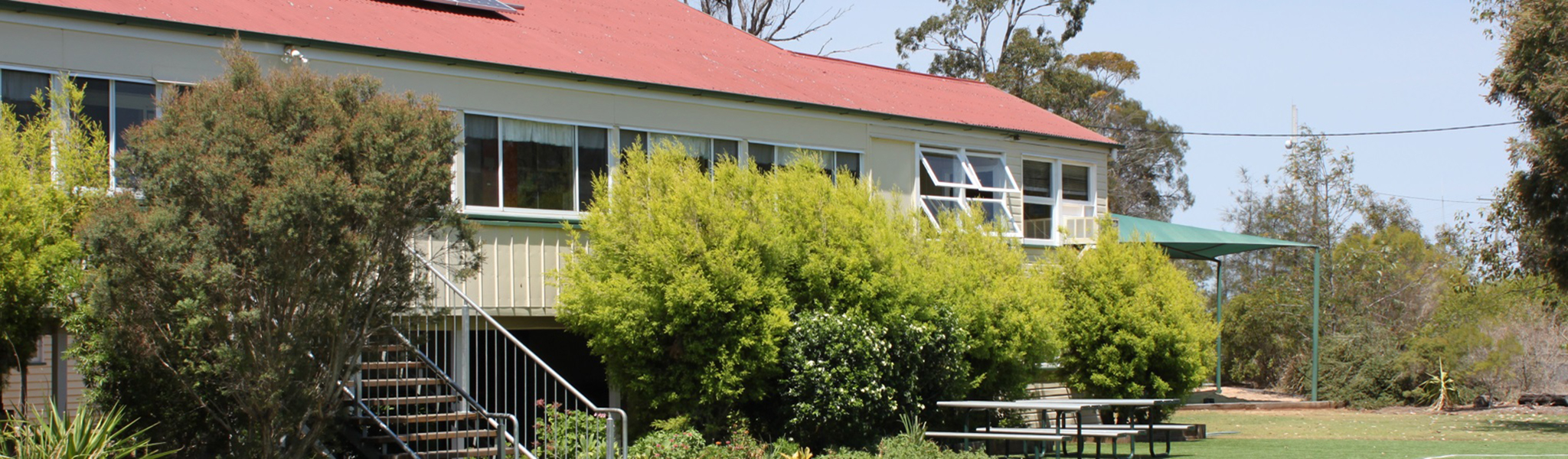
Bowenville State School, 2023

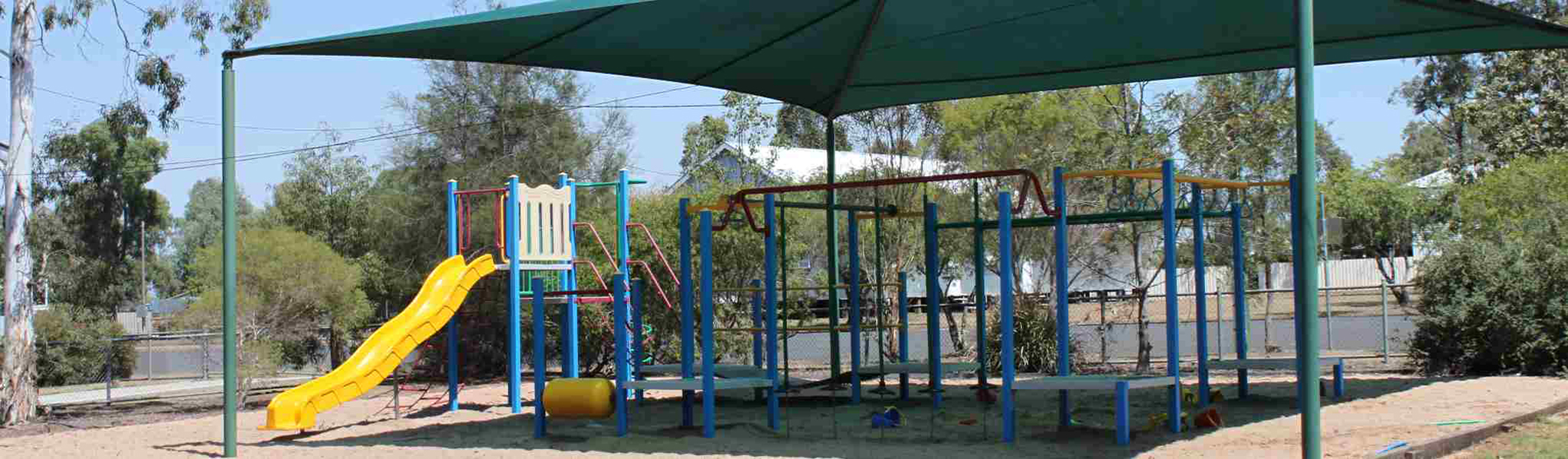
Bowenville State School playground, 2023

Bowenville State School is a government primary (Prep-6) school for boys and girls at 2 Irvingdale Road (27.3037°S 151.4939°E). In 2017, the school had an enrolment of 15 students with 4 teachers (1 full-time equivalent) and 5 non-teaching staff (2 full-time equivalent).

There are no secondary schools in Bowenville. The nearest secondary schools is Oakey State High School in Oakey 29.3 kilometres (18.2 mi) to the east or Dalby State High School, Dalby Christian College and Our Lady of the Southern Cross College in Dalby 28.3 kilometres (17.6 mi) to the west.

== Amenities ==
Library services in Bowenville are provided by the Toowoomba Regional Council's mobile library service. The van visits Bowenville State School on the 2nd and 4th Tuesday of each month.

The Bowenville Reserve (in Wainu), situated along the Oakey Creek, provides a free camping area with access to non-potable water and toilet facilities. There are also picnic areas, bins, shelters, tables, and a playground. Shore fishing, small water craft, and electric motors are permitted.
