= Grassdale, Queensland =

Grassdale
- Suburb
- Interactive map of Grassdale
- Coordinates: 27.4147°S 151.1386°E
- Country: Australia
- State: Queensland
- LGA: Toowoomba Region
- Location: 37.8 km (23.5 mi) SW of Dalby; 41.2 km (25.6 mi) NNW of Cecil Plains; 98.4 km (61.1 mi) WNW of Toowoomba; 226 km (140 mi) W of Brisbane

Government
  - State electorate: Condamine
  - Federal division: Groom

Area
  - Total: 73.6 km^{2} (28.4 sq mi)

Population
  - Total: 0 (2021 census)
  - Density: 0.000/km^{2} (0.000/sq mi)
- Time zone: UTC+10:00 (AEST)
- Postcode: 4405
Suburbs around Grassdale
Nandi	Springvale	Springvale
Halliford	Grassdale	Cecil Plains
Cecil Plains	Cecil Plains	Cecil Plains

Grassdale is a rural locality in the Toowoomba Region, Queensland, Australia. In the 2021 census, Grassdale had "no people or a very low population".

== Geography ==
The land use is a mixture of grazing on native vegetation in the west of the locality and irrigated and dry crop growing in the east of the locality.

== History ==
The locality was officially named and bounded on 25 February 2000.

== Demographics ==
In the 2016 census, Grassdale had a population of 4 people.

In the 2021 census, Grassdale had "no people or a very low population".

== Economy ==
In the centre of the locality is Grassdale Feedlot which processes over 70,000 cattle each year and claims to be Australia's largest feedlot. It is operated by Mort & Co.

== Education ==
There are no schools in Grassdale. The nearest government primary schools are Cecil Plains State School in neighbouring Cecil Plains to the south and Dalby State School in Dalby to the north-east. The nearest government secondary schools are Cecil Plains State School (to Year 9) and Dalby State High School (to Year 12) in Dalby.
