= Irvingdale, Queensland =

Irvingdale
- Suburb
- Interactive map of Irvingdale
- Coordinates: 27.1540°S 151.4590°E
- Country: Australia
- State: Queensland
- LGAs: Toowoomba Region; Western Downs Region
- Location: 25.1 km (15.6 mi) E of Dalby; 74.7 km (46.4 mi) NW of Toowoomba CBD; 202 km (126 mi) WNW of Brisbane

Government
  - State electorates: Condamine; Warrego
  - Federal divisions: Groom; Maranoa

Area
  - Total: 172.3 km^{2} (66.5 sq mi)

Population
  - Total: 163 (2021 census)
  - Density: 0.946/km^{2} (2.450/sq mi)
- Time zone: UTC+10:00 (AEST)
- Postcode: 4404
Suburbs around Irvingdale
Kaimkillenbun	Moola	Quinalow
Dalby	Irvingdale	Quinalow
Dalby	Blaxland; Bowenville	Brymaroo

Irvingdale is a rural locality split between the Toowoomba Region and the Western Downs Region, both in Queensland, Australia. In the 2021 census, Irvingdale had a population of 163 people.

== Geography ==
Mocattas Corner is a neighbourhood on the north-west boundary of the locality with Dalby (27.1166°S 151.3666°E). It takes its name from the former Mocattas Corner railway station (27.1159°S 151.3629°E), which in turn was named after George Gershon Mocatta, a pastoralist who took up the Cumkillenbar pastoral run in August 1849.

The Dalby–Cooyar Road runs along the western boundary. The Dalby - Nungil Road runs through from west to east.

== History ==
The locality's name is derived from Irvingdale pastoral run established in the 1840s and was located east of Dalby and north of Mount Irving. It is thought that the Irving name refers to pastoralist Clark Irving, who represented the Darling Downs in the New South Wales Legislative Assembly prior to the separation.

Irvingdale Provisional School opened on 22 April 1880 as a half-time provisional school in conjunction with Rosalie Plains Provisional School (meaning the two schools shared a single teacher) until it closed on 6 May 1881. On 2 November 1881, it reopened as a full-time provisional school. On 1 January 1909, it became Irvingdale State School. It closed on 31 December 1946. It was approx 23 Irvingdale Post Office Road (approx 27.19926°S 151.50282°E).

Mocatta's Corner Provisional School opened circa 1887. On 1 January 1909, it became Mocatta's Corner State School. It closed in 1925. It was on the south-west corner of the junction of Dalby Cooyar Road and Mocattas Corner Road (27.11677°S 151.36232°E).

In April 1905, the tender of David Cahill of Dalby was accepted to construct a Catholic church in Irvingdale for £200. On Sunday 18 February 1906, Reverend Father Nolan blessed and opened the Sacred Heart Roman Catholic church in Irivingdale. Roman Catholic Archbishop Robert Dunne was to have performed the ceremony, but was unable to attend due to a shortage of priests in Brisbane.

Edgefield State School opened in February 1916 and closed in April 1924. In 1928, the Edgefield State School building was relocated to establish a new state school in Tipton.

On 4 November 1946, a new Edgefield Provisional School opened. In 1949, it became Edgefield State School. It closed in 1960. The school was located at the northern end of Salt Well Road (27.13729°S 151.46848°E).

== Demographics ==
In the 2016 census, Irvingdale had a population of 194 people.

In the 2021 census, Irvingdale had a population of 163 people.

== Education ==
There are no schools in Irvingdale. The nearest government primary schools are:

- Kaimkillenbun State School in neighbouring Kaimkillenbun to the north-west
- Quinalow State School in neighbouring Quinalow to the north-east
- Bowenville State School in neighbouring Bowenville to the south
- Dalby State School and Dalby South State School in neighbouring Dalby to the south-west

The nearest government secondary schools are Quinalow State School (to Year 10) and Dalby State High School (to Year 12) in Dalby.

== Amenities ==
Sacred Heart Catholic Church is at 1246 Bowenville Moola Road (27.2006°S 151.5136°E).
