= Springvale, Queensland =

Springvale
- Suburb
- Interactive map of Springvale
- Coordinates: 27.3622°S 151.1916°E
- Country: Australia
- State: Queensland
- LGA: Western Downs Region
- Location: 32.7 km (20.3 mi) N of Cecil Plains; 32.7 km (20.3 mi) SSW of Dalby; 89.9 km (55.9 mi) WNW of Toowoomba; 217 km (135 mi) W of Brisbane

Government
  - State electorate: Warrego
  - Federal division: Maranoa

Area
  - Total: 80.5 km^{2} (31.1 sq mi)

Population
  - Total: 52 (2021 census)
  - Density: 0.646/km^{2} (1.673/sq mi)
- Time zone: UTC+10:00 (AEST)
- Postcode: 4405
Suburbs around Springvale
Nandi	Nandi	St Ruth
Nandi	Springvale	St Ruth
Grassdale	Cecil Plains	Tipton

Springvale is a rural locality in the Western Downs Region, Queensland, Australia. In the 2021 census, Springvale had a population of 52 people.

== History ==
Springvale State School opened on 13 April 1954 and closed in 1965. It was on a 10-acre (4.0 ha) site on the south-western corner of Hennings Connection Road and Grassdale Road (27.35524°S 151.20568°E).

== Demographics ==
In the 2016 census, Springvale had a population of 74 people.

In the 2021 census, Springvale had a population of 52 people.

== Education ==
There are no schools in Springvale. The nearest government primary schools are:

- Cecil Plains State School in neighbouring Cecil Plains to the south
- Dalby State School in Dalby to the north
- Dalby South State School in Dalby to the north

The nearest government secondary schools are Cecil Plains State School (to Year 9) in Cecil Plains and Dalby State High School (to Year 12) in Dalby.

== Community groups ==
The Springvale Kupunn branch of the Queensland Country Women's Association meets at 52 Cunningham Street, Dalby.
