= Nandi, Queensland =

Nandi
- Suburb
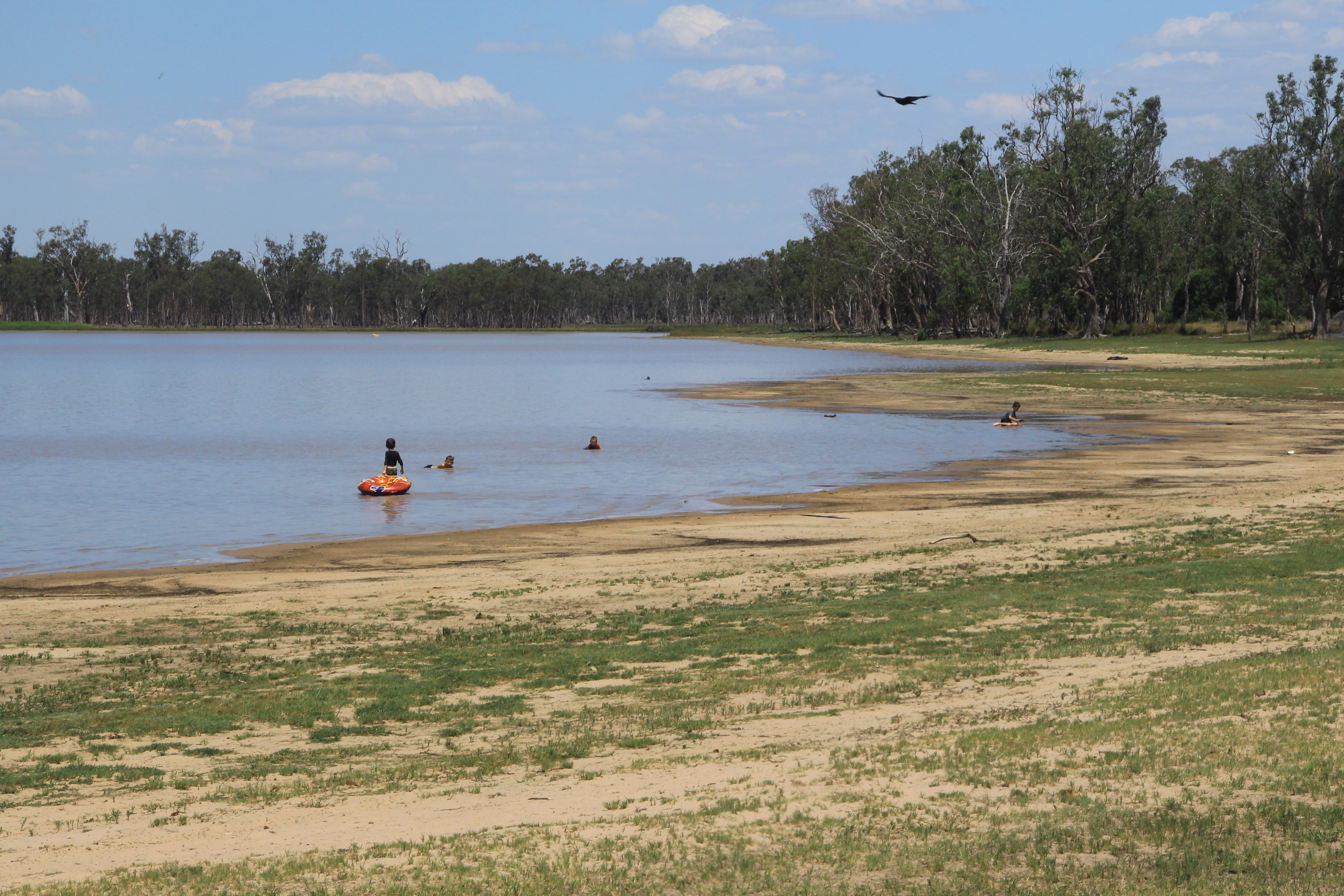
- Lake Broadwater, 2016

- Interactive map of Nandi
- Coordinates: 27.2866°S 151.16°E
- Country: Australia
- State: Queensland
- LGA: Western Downs Region
- Location: 15.2 km (9.4 mi) SW of Dalby; 107 km (66 mi) NW of Toowoomba; 225 km (140 mi) WNW of Brisbane

Government
  - State electorate: Warrego
  - Federal division: Maranoa

Area
  - Total: 151.1 km^{2} (58.3 sq mi)

Population
  - Total: 105 (2021 census)
  - Density: 0.695/km^{2} (1.800/sq mi)
- Time zone: UTC+10:00 (AEST)
- Postcode: 4405
Suburbs around Nandi
Ducklo	Ranges Bridge	Dalby
Ducklo	Nandi	St Ruth
Halliford	Grassdale	Springvale

Nandi is a rural locality in the Western Downs Region, Queensland, Australia. In the 2021 census, Nandi had a population of 105 people.

== Geography ==
The locality is 15.2 kilometres (15.2 km) south-west of Dalby on the Darling Downs.

The Condamine River forms most of the north-eastern and eastern boundary of the locality.

The Glenmorgan railway line passes from the north-east (Dalby) to the north-west (Ducklo) of the locality. The locality is served by Nandi railway station (27.2139°S 151.1714°E).

The Moonie Highway also passes from the north-east to the north-west of the locality but to the south of the railway line.

Broadwater Lagoon (also known as Lake Broadwater, or simply Broadwater) is in the south-west of the locality (27.35°S 151.1°E). The lagoon and the surrounding area are protected within the Lake Broadwater Conservation Park and the Lake Broadwater Resources Reserve. The lagoon is the only large natural freshwater lake on the Darling Downs. It has area of 350 hectares (860 acres) and, when full, is 3–4 metres (9.8–13.1 ft) deep. It is an important refuge for waterbirds and other wildlife.

Apart from the protected areas aroune the lagoon, the land use is predominantly crop growing.

== History ==
The Queensland Railways Department named the railway station on 8 October 1910. Nandi is an Aboriginal word meaning spur winged plover. The locality presumably takes its name from the railway station.

== Demographics ==
In the 2016 census, Nandi had a population of 108 people.

In the 2021 census, Nandi had a population of 105 people.

== Education ==
There are no schools in Nandi. The nearest government primary schools are Dalby State School and Dalby South State School, both in neighbouring Dalby to the north-east. The nearest government secondary school is Dalby State High School, also in Dalby.

== Attractions ==
The Western Downs Regional Council manages the Lake Broadwater Conservation Park. Activities at the park include camping, bushwalking, bird watching, swimming and boating. Fishing is not permitted.

Lake Broadwater is a shallow lake that dries out periodically, sometimes for lengthy periods. After heavy rains the lake fills up to three to four metres deep. It covers approximately 350 hectares. More than 230 species of birds have been recorded here.
