= Cecil Plains, Queensland =

Cecil Plains
- Town
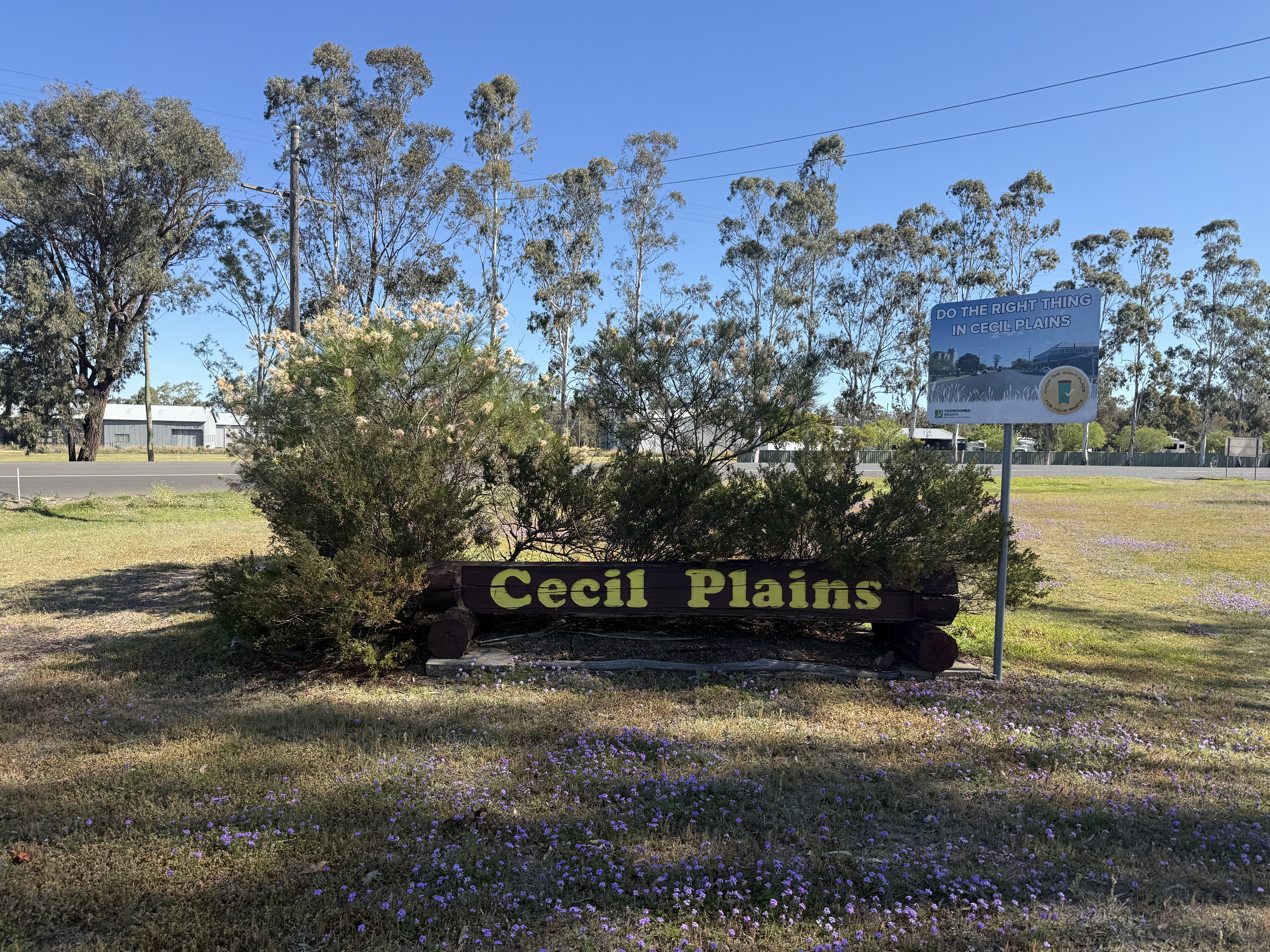
- Main town sign

- Interactive map of Cecil Plains
- Coordinates: 27.5316°S 151.1930°E
- Country: Australia
- State: Queensland
- LGA: Toowoomba Region
- Location: 43.0 km (26.7 mi) S of Dalby; 80.9 km (50.3 mi) W of Toowoomba; 211 km (131 mi) W of Brisbane

Government
  - State electorates: Condamine; Southern Downs
  - Federal division: Maranoa

Area
  - Total: 362.2 km^{2} (139.8 sq mi)

Population
  - Total: 380 (2021 census)
  - Density: 1.049/km^{2} (2.72/sq mi)
- Time zone: UTC+10:00 (AEST)
- Postcode: 4407
Localities around Cecil Plains
| Grassdale | Springvale | St Ruth; Tipton |
| Halliford | Cecil Plains | Nangwee |
| Dunmore; Kurrowah | Condamine Plains | Brachview |

Cecil Plains is a rural town and locality in the Toowoomba Region, Queensland, Australia. In the 2021 census, the locality of Cecil Plains had a population of 380 people.

== Geography ==
Cecil Plains is in the Darling Downs, 217 kilometres (135 mi) west of the state capital, Brisbane. The fertile black soil around Cecil Plains is ideal for cotton production and the town is now the home of one of the largest cotton gins in the Southern Hemisphere.

The Pampas-Horrane Road (State Route 82) enters the locality from the south and then turns west on Toowoomba–Cecil Plains Road. In the town State Route 82 turns north on Dalby–Cecil Plains Road. Millmerran-Cecil Plains Road and Cecil Plains-Moonie Road both enter from the west.

== History ==
European settlement in the area began in 1842, when Henry Stuart Russell claimed land around the Condamine River to establish Cecil Plains station. The site of the station homestead was to become the site of the town. Ludwig Leichhardt used the homestead as a base for two expeditions into the surrounding region in 1844 and 1847. The station originally grazed cattle but later moved to wool production.

The town takes its name from the pastoral station, which in turn was named after Russell's mother Cecil Charlotte Russell, née Pemberton.

In 1877, 8,300 acres (3,400 ha) of land was resumed from the Cecil Plains pastoral run to establish smaller farms. The land was offered for selection on 24 April 1877.

Cecil Plains Provisional School opened on 17 January 1898. It closed briefly in 1910 and 1912 and then again from 10 October 1917 to 17 June 1919. It became Cecil Plains State School on 1 February 1922. In 1964, a secondary department was added. In 1975, a pre-school centre was added.

In 1916, Cecil Plains station was acquired by the Queensland government and subdivided for closer settlement, with some parcels reserved for soldier settlers. The new settlers produced mainly wheat and dairy.

The Cecil Plains railway arrived in 1919 with the town being served by the Cecil Plains railway station (27.5336°S 151.1900°E).

The post office opened in 1921 (a receiving office had been open from 1890).

Haslemere State School opened in July 1925. It closed on 28 July 1961. The school was located at 2811 Pampas Horrane Road (27.59145°S 151.24157°E).

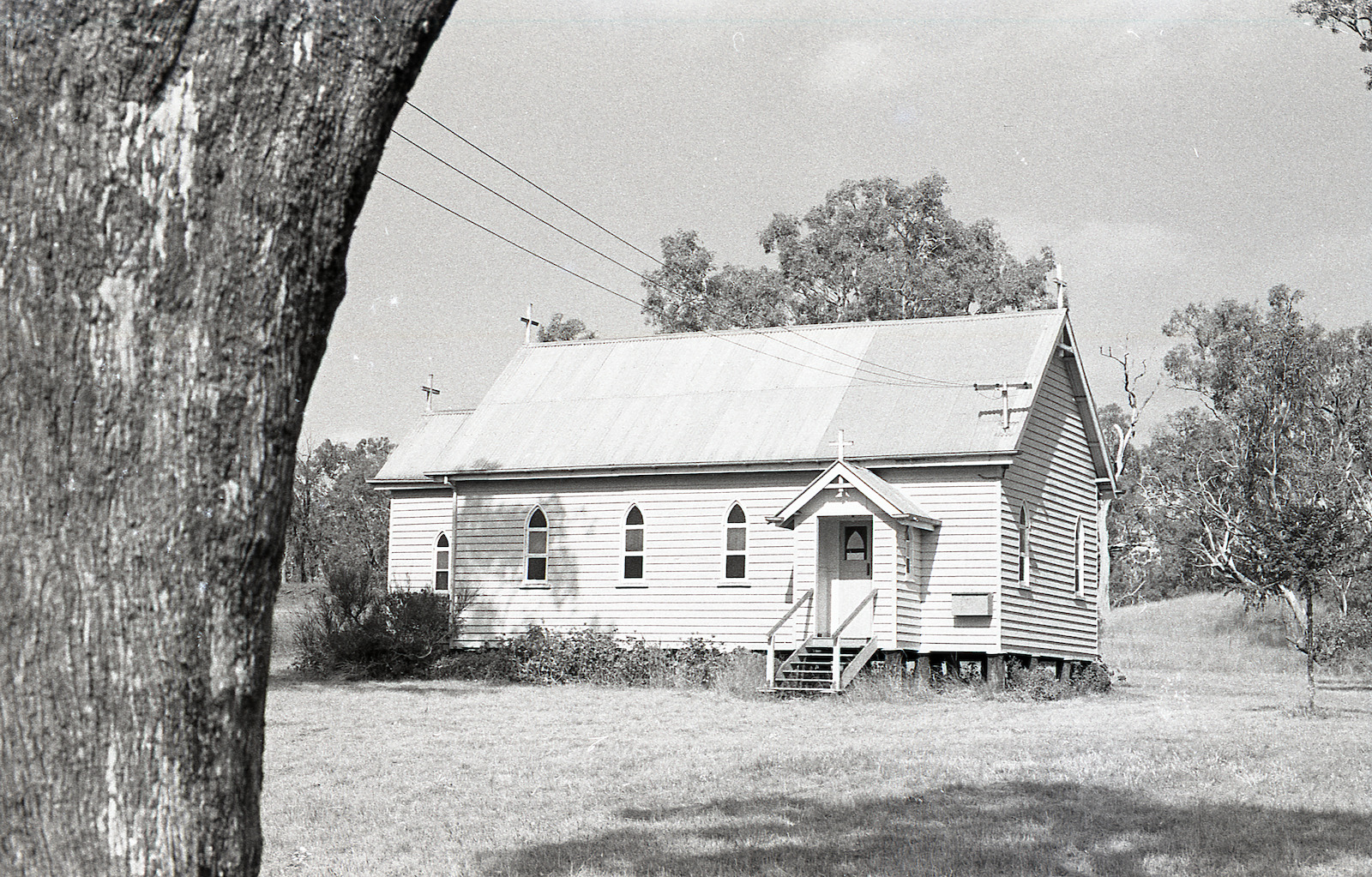
St Margaret's Anglican Church, 1975

In November 1925, the Anglican Diocese of Brisbane provided a loan of £250 to establish a church in Cecil Plains. St Margaret's Anglican Church was dedicated on Sunday 2 January 1927 by Archdeacon Glover. The architect was Mr Marks of Toowoomba and the timber church was built by J. Johnson of Dalby.

On Sunday 21 December 1930, Bishop James Byrne officially opened and blessed Our Lady of Lourdes Catholic Church.

A police station opened in 1934.

The local pub is called the Victory Hotel, as a result of a successful vote in 1938 (on the third attempt) to establish a drinking establishment in the town.

Cecil Plains Presbyterian Church was officially opened in 1938. It was at 51 Geraghty Street and has now been converted into a house.

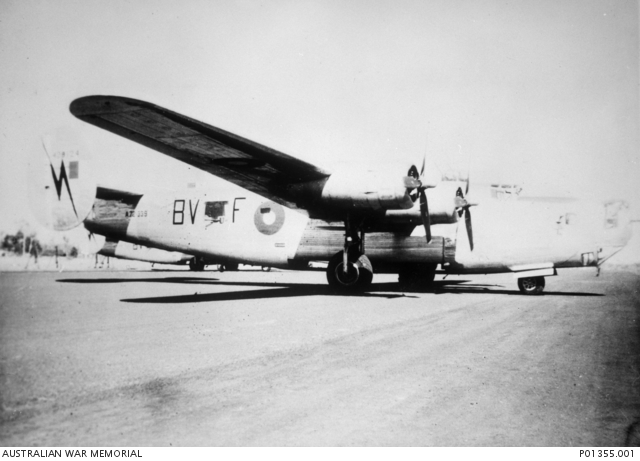
RAAF 102 Squadron B-24 Liberator, Cecil Plains Airfield, July 1945

Cecil Plains Airfield (also known as Tipton Airfield) was established in early 1942 during World War II, when a Japanese invasion of Australia was feared. Although built for use by US Air Force bombers, it was never used by the US Air Force. From 19 December 1944 until late April 1945, the RAAF's 12 Squadron was based there flying Vultee Vengeances and B-24 Liberators. The RAAF's 102 Squadron operated from the airfield from May 1945, relocating to RAAF Base Amberley by the end of 1945. The airfield had two cross runways and was off Cook Road (27.4627°S 151.2094°E); the runways and taxiways are still visible in the aerial imagery.

From the 1960s, cotton became the main crop grown in the area.

== Demographics ==
In the 2011 census, the locality of Cecil Plains had a population of 678 people.

In the 2016 census, the locality of Cecil Plains had a population of 429 people.

In the 2021 census, the locality of Cecil Plains had a population of 380 people.

== Education ==
Cecil Plains State School is a government primary and secondary (Prep-9) school for boys and girls at Taylor Street (27.5323°S 151.1928°E). In 2017, the school had an enrolment of 57 students with 13 teachers (9 full-time equivalent) and 11 non-teaching staff (7 full-time equivalent). In 2018, the school had an enrolment of 65 students with 13 teachers (10 full-time equivalent) and 14 non-teaching staff (7 full-time equivalent).

The nearest government secondary school offering education to Year 12 is Dalby State High School in Dalby to the north.

== Amenities ==
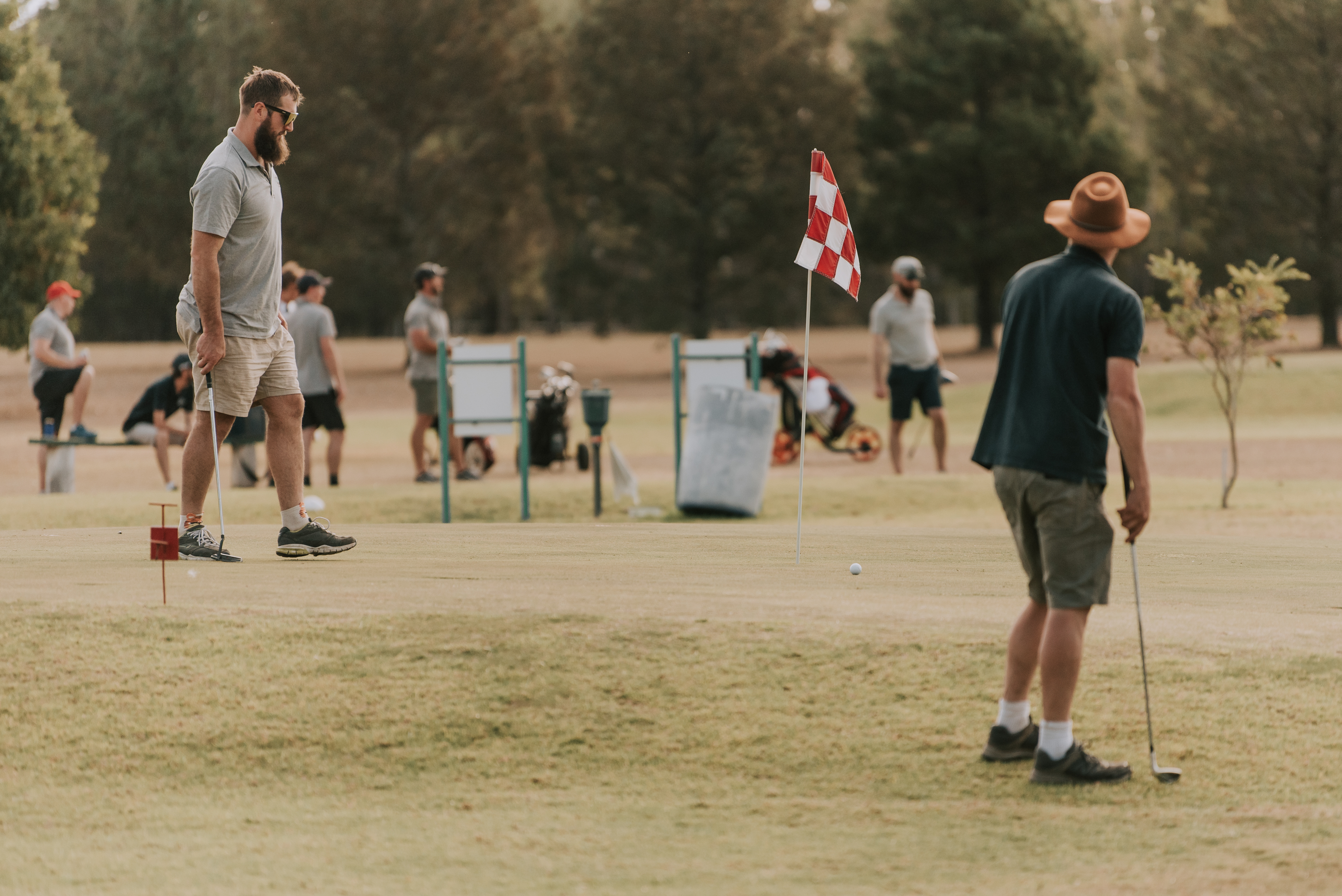
Cecil Plains Golf Course

The Cecil Plains Library is operated by the Toowoomba Regional Council and opened in 1987. The library is located on Taylor Street and is open three days a week. Public accessible wifi is provided. Current services and collections can be found at the Toowoomba Regional Council Library Service website.

St Margaret's Anglican Church holds fortnightly Sunday services; it is part of the parish of St John's of Dalby. The church is on Watson Street on the south side of the railway station, set among trees (27.5344°S 151.1922°E).

Our Lady of Lourdes Catholic Church is at 21-23 Geraghty Street (27.5314°S 151.1958°E). It is part of the Millmerran Parish. It holds monthly services.

Cecil Plains is host to a number of recreational facilities, including the Cecil Plains Golf Club and Apex Park at the Cecil Plains Weir.
