= Dalby State High School =

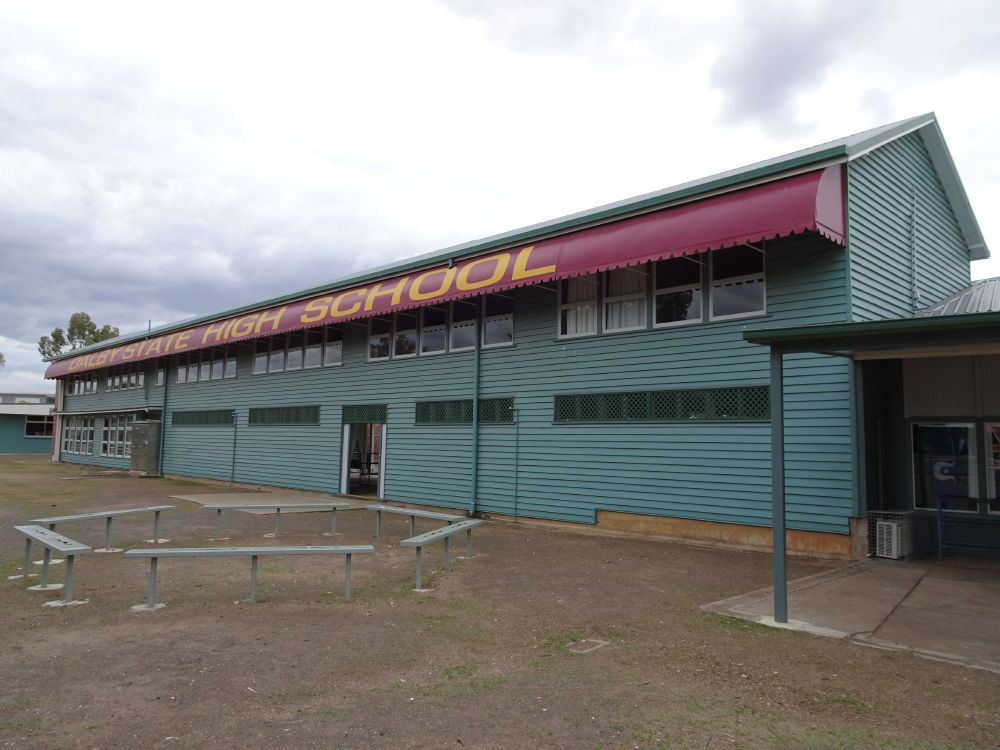
- Block C, south side

- Location within Queensland
- 27.1773°S 151.2590°E
- Location: 28B Nicholson Street, Dalby, Western Downs Region, Queensland, Australia

History
- Design period: 1940s–1960s (Post-WWII)
- Built: 1953–1959

Queensland Heritage Register
- Official name: Dalby State High School
- Type: state heritage
- Designated: 19 August 2016
- Reference no.: 650036
- Type: Education, Research, Scientific Facility: School – state (high)
- Theme: Educating Queenslanders: Providing secondary education

Dalby State High School is a heritage-listed state high school at 28B Nicholson Street, Dalby, Western Downs Region, Queensland, Australia. It was built from 1953 to 1954. It was added to the Queensland Heritage Register on 19 August 2016.

== History ==
Dalby State High School (SHS) opened on its present site in 1954, due to overcrowding at Dalby State School (est. 1861) – which had accommodated a secondary department (or "high top") since 1914. In 2016 Dalby SHS retains six 1950s buildings, and part of a seventh, which demonstrate the evolution of standard government designs:

- the eastern half of Block A (Boulton & Paul prefabricated timber vocational buildings, 1953–1955)
- the eastern section of Block B (Boulton & Paul prefabricated timber school building, 1953–1954)
- Block D (highset timber school building with semi-enclosed stair, 1954–1955)
- Block C (timber school building with timber floor trusses, 1956–1958)
- Block F (administration building, 1958–1959)
- Block J (brick veneer vocational building, 1958–1959).

It also retains its 1950s site planning; covered links; and paved areas associated with Block F; along with a sports oval and mature perimeter trees. The school has been in continuous operation since establishment.

The traditional land of the Barunggam people, Dalby was established with European settlement of the Darling Downs from 1840. Laid out in 1852, Dalby was resurveyed and named in 1853, and its Town Reserve was declared in August 1855. The first urban land sales were held in 1857, and Dalby became a municipality (the Borough of Dalby) on 29 August 1863.

The growing town soon required a school. National schools, established in 1848 in New South Wales, were continued in Queensland following the colony's creation in 1859. Following the introduction of the Education Act 1860, Queensland's national and public schools grew from four in 1860 to 230 by 1875. The State Education Act 1875 provided for free, compulsory and secular primary education and established the Department of Public Instruction. Schools became a community focus, a symbol of progress, and a source of pride, with enduring connections formed with past pupils, parents, and teachers.

To help ensure consistency and economy, the Queensland Government developed standard plans for its school buildings. From the 1860s until the 1960s, Queensland school buildings were predominantly timber-framed, an easy and cost-effective approach that also enabled the government to provide facilities in remote areas. Standard designs were continually refined in response to changing needs and educational philosophy and Queensland school buildings were particularly innovative in climate control, lighting, and ventilation. Standardisation produced distinctly similar schools across Queensland with complexes of typical components.

A school was built in Dalby by public subscription by early 1859, and the Dalby National School (later Dalby State School) opened on 1 June 1861 on Cunningham Street. The 1859 school appears to have been sited elsewhere, east of Myall Creek. In September 1861 the locals voted to transfer the building and land to the Board of Education, to become a vested national school. In non-vested national schools, the Board of Education did not own the building, but usually provided the teacher. From 1875 national schools were referred to as state schools.

Transport improvements had a major effect on the prosperity and growth of Dalby. The extension of the Western railway line from Toowoomba to Dalby in 1868 led to a boom in the town, which had a population of 3500 by the mid-1870s. However, Dalby's population plummeted to 1500 when the line was extended west towards Roma in 1877, and people followed the railhead. Farming was initially inhibited due to a lack of rain, and without refrigeration agricultural produce could not be delivered to distant markets. By 1885 the population was 1296, and this had only recovered to 1416 by 1901. Dalby's population recovered in the early 20th century due to the Queensland Government's enforced break-up of the large pastoral stations, and its construction of branch railway lines, which encouraged closer settlement. Dairying and wheat cultivation expanded, and the development of agriculture led to secondary industries in Dalby. However, the rural economy of the area remained predominantly pastoral until after World War II.

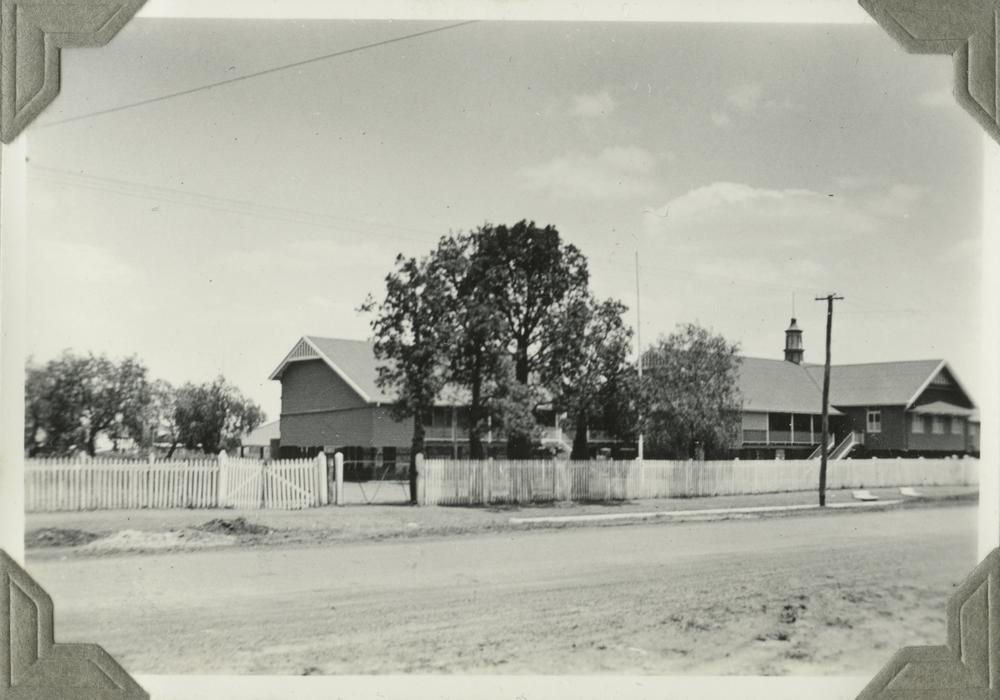
Dalby State School and "high top", circa 1935

As Dalby grew, so did the state school. A secondary department opened in January 1914. In Queensland, governments were slow to establish state secondary education, considering this to be of little relevance to Queensland's primary industry-based economy. It was not until 1912 that the government instituted a high school system, whereby separate high schools were established in major towns or, where the student population was too small, a primary school was expanded to include a "high top". High tops were an economical measure that provided essentially the same education while utilising already established facilities. In Queensland generally, high schools remained few in number until after World War II.

Over three decades, enrolment at the Dalby State School's high top slowly rose, from 16 students in 1915 to 41 in 1944. Domestic science classes were also added to the secondary department in 1922, and woodwork and commercial courses followed in 1927. Pupils from the wider district outside Dalby also attended these vocational classes, some of which were held at night. In 1934 the high top building (extant in 2016) was shifted, to be parallel to, and slightly behind, the west end of the main school building . Vocational education was a Queensland Government priority to support the development of primary industries; this evolved after World War I into a variety of subjects. Vocational training within primary education began in 1895 with drawing classes and expanded to include domestic sciences, agriculture, and sheet metal and wood working classes. The subjects required a variety of purpose-built facilities and were initially gender segregated. Standard, purpose-designed vocational buildings were first introduced in 1928. In 1936 the Minister for Education permitted students to take vocational subjects in lieu of geography or history in the Junior Examination, increasing the subjects' popularity.

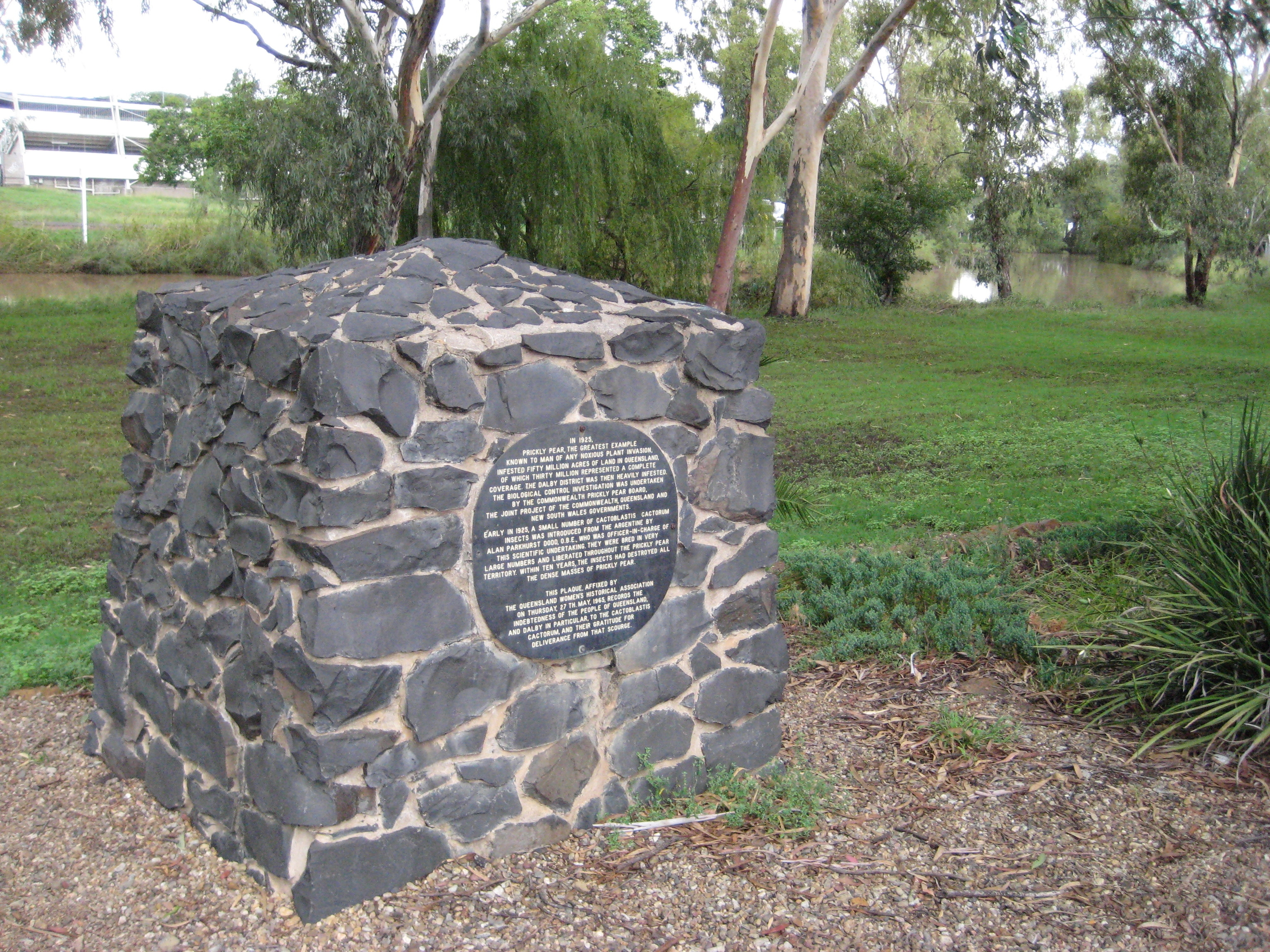
Cactoblastic monument, commemorating the eradication of prickly pear, Dalby, 2008

Although closer settlement boosted agriculture, prickly pear cactus was a serious impediment for farmers in the Dalby district, until it was eradicated by the introduction of the moth Cactoblastis cactorum to Queensland in the late 1920s. As a result, Dalby experienced renewed growth and prosperity, and its population reached 3500 in the mid-1930s.

There was further expansion of agriculture in the Dalby District after World War II, due to the Soldier Settlement Scheme, which lead to an influx of young farmers. During the 1950s grain and wheat silos were constructed around the district, and a new flour mill was opened in Dalby. There was a related expansion of secondary industries, and an extensive home building program in the town. Dalby's population reached 4385 in 1947, and 6182 in 1954, with an acute housing shortage in town by 1955.

Dalby State School's enrolments grew in step with the town, and extra classrooms were added in the 1940s and early 1950s. The Department of Public Instruction was largely unprepared for the enormous demand for state education that began in the late 1940s and continued well into the 1960s. This was a nation-wide occurrence resulting from the unprecedented population growth now termed the "baby boom". Queensland schools were overcrowded and, to cope, many new buildings were constructed and existing buildings were extended. Enrolment at Dalby State School rose to 491 by 1945, and to 1024 by 1954. Leslie F Diplock, head teacher of Dalby State School from 1946, and Member of the Queensland Legislative Assembly for Condamine from 1953, was instrumental in pushing for a new high school. In 1950 a member of the school's Parents and Citizen's association complained that the desks were so crowded that the children could not move their elbows to write.

A decision was made to provide a state high school for Dalby in July 1953, and building plans were prepared by the Department of Public Works (DPW) the following month. However, a site plan had previously been prepared in 1952. This early site plan showed entrance pathways leading from the Warrego Highway to the west end of the intermediate wing and from Nicholson Street to the east end of the domestic science block. From their introduction, the design of high school buildings was the responsibility of the DPW. The first high schools were established within existing technical colleges, utilising their buildings. The first purpose-built high school buildings were constructed in 1917.

In the 1950s the number of high schools in Queensland increased significantly. The grounds were large, greater than 12 acres (4.9 ha) providing ample room for sports facilities. The general classroom buildings were the same standard types as used for primary schools but high schools also included purpose-built science laboratories, domestic science buildings, workshops for woodwork and metal work, libraries, and gymnasiums. These were also built to standard plans but were specific to their use and not a continuation of previous designs.

Also, there was a focus on the fit between the school and its neighbourhood, as well as site planning for expansion and ideal solar orientation. In the early 1950s, architects developed master planning concepts that influenced the design and layout of the whole school. Initially, these plans were broadly based on regular and symmetrical plan forms around a central or prominent axis. This concept was replaced a few years later by architects planning for growth and change. There was a shift away from grid-like layouts to organic layouts. Nuclear plans were designed, centred on an administration/reception building with classroom wings connected to and fanning away from the nucleus. The primary focus was the ideal solar orientation of buildings. Interest was also shown in developing schemes that related to the natural contours and existing vegetation. Unlike the more formal and symmetrical plans of previous periods, new plans were developed that tended to be asymmetrical and more open. The long, narrow buildings were positioned so that the spaces captured between them were triangular, opening out into the landscape.

At Dalby, the site chosen, northwest of Nicholson Street, was previously a 23-acre (9.3 ha) Reserve for Park and Recreation, of which 20 acres (8.1 ha) and 19.3 perches (490 m^{2}) were gazetted as a school reserve by 1955. The northeast half of the school site appears to have been gazetted for Hospital purposes in 1954, before being gazetted for school purposes in 1955.

The early development of the school reflects the 1950s shift in emphasis from grid-like layouts towards more organic planning strategies, which provided for "ordered growth from a nucleus". The initial school buildings consisted of four highset timber-framed buildings near the corner of Nicholson Street and the Warrego Highway – arranged in three parallel wings staggered one behind the other, aligned just east of north with verandahs along the north sides, and linked by an axis of highset covered walkways.

The southernmost wing (originally called Block A, but called Block D as at 2016) was for the intermediate school and administration, and this building consisted of (from the west) three 24-by-24-foot (7.3 by 7.3 m) classrooms and then two 20-by-24-foot (6.1 by 7.3 m) classrooms; with a 16-by-24-foot (4.9 by 7.3 m) library and reading room at the east end. The three middle classrooms were separated by folding doors. The administration section, attached off the north verandah, included a principal's room and an assistant teachers room.

The high school wing (Block B originally and in 2016) consisted of a small store room and assistant teachers room at the west end; a science room, a lecture room, and a classroom; then a hallway linking to the covered ways; and a commercial room at the east end of the wing - each of the main rooms being 24 by 24 feet (7.3 by 7.3 m).

The vocational training wing (originally comprising Blocks C and D, now called Block A in 2016) consisted of two buildings: the eastern one was a domestic science block (originally Block C), with cooking and dressmaking classrooms in the centre, each 24 by 24 feet (7.3 by 7.3 m); with a teachers room and girls change room at the east end, and a dining room and laundry room at the west end of the block. The western building was the manual training block (originally Block D, of which only the east end survives in 2016), which had a sheet metalwork room and a woodwork room, each being 24 by 24 feet (7.3 by 7.3 m), with a store and teachers room at the west end, and a store and wood machinery room at the east end of the block.

Plans of the semi-enclosed understories of the buildings included a health services room under the assistant teachers room in the administration section, and a drawing room under the east end of the intermediate wing. There was also a timber storeroom under the east end of the manual training block. All the buildings had horizontal boarded cladding and large banks of hopper windows facing south.

The high school wing and domestic science block were built in 1953–54, followed by the manual training block (completing the vocational training wing) and the intermediate wing in 1954–55.

There were differences in construction methods between the wings. The high school wing (Boulton & Paul prefabricated timber school building) and the domestic science and manual training blocks (both Boulton & Paul prefabricated timber vocational buildings) of the vocational training wing at Dalby were imported buildings. The Boulton & Paul buildings were Type F/T1 and F/T3 respectively, the latter being a design for vocational buildings. Responding to materials shortages and the pressures of the baby boom, the DPW imported a British building system from manufacturers Boulton & Paul Ltd of Norwich, England. Based on an 8-foot (2.4 m) planning and construction module, the prefabricated elements in the Boulton & Paul system included wall panels, ceiling panels, roof trusses and banks of awning windows. The buildings were constructed at many schools across Queensland between 1951 and 1958. Boulton & Paul buildings were timber framed and clad, had a verandah as circulation, and a gable roof. Ideally, they were oriented so the verandah faced north and the classroom faced south but were also added as extensions to existing buildings regardless of orientation. The stairs to the verandah were often semi-enclosed. The building could be low-set, or highset with a play space underneath, and had extensive areas of timber framed awning windows, providing more glazing than had ever been used in Queensland classrooms; almost the entirety of the verandah wall and the opposite classroom wall were glazed. Natural ventilation and lighting was abundant. The classrooms were 24 by 24 feet (7.3 m × 7.3 m), larger than most previous classrooms.

The intermediate wing was a highset timber school building with semi-enclosed stair. From the early 1950s the Department of Public Instruction introduced and developed new standard plans for school buildings, which were similar to the Boulton & Paul buildings but not prefabricated. These buildings were also highset timber-framed structures with the understorey used as covered play space. The principal type was a long and narrow building with a gable roof. A semi-enclosed stair connected the understorey to a north facing verandah running the length of the building, with full height timber verandah posts that extended from ground level to the roof line. Classrooms opened off the verandah and had extensive areas of windows; almost the entirety of the verandah wall and the opposite classroom wall were glazed – with awning (top-hung) windows to the southern elevation, and double-hung sashes to the verandah wall. This type was the most commonly constructed in the 1950s in Queensland.

The new Dalby State High School opened 2 February 1954, with an enrolment of 67. At this time the floor was still being laid for the domestic science block, and electric lighting was not yet installed. In March it was reported that commercial classes had started at the state high school and that home science would probably transfer from the state school by Easter. In late 1954 it was reported that state high schools had opened at Dalby, Banyo, Salisbury, and Indooroopilly that year. The school was then officially opened on 4 September 1954 by the Minister for Education, George Devries, who noted that enrolments in state secondary schools had doubled from 5000 to 10,000 in the previous 5 years. He also stated that the buildings at Dalby were well ventilated, with a large amount of window space, and a generous floor area. At the time of the official opening the high school had an enrolment of 49 students in Form III and 21 in Form IV, and the manual training block had not yet been built. Grades 7 and 8 would transfer to the new school when the intermediate school building was completed.

Soon after the official opening a working bee was held on the school grounds. Seventy trees, including athel pines, silky oak, and other pines, plus Dalby myalls, and ironbark, were planted on the frontages to Nicholson Street and the Warrego Highway, and by December 1954 a playing field area had been mown, ploughed and harrowed, ready for rolling.

Grade 8 moved to the intermediate school at the new high school in 1956, followed by Grade 7 in 1957. The idea of creating an intermediate level of schooling emerged in Queensland during the late 1920s. This was intended to be a transition between primary and secondary schooling. Intermediate schools also offered vocational subjects: manual training for boys and domestic science for girls. By 1961 there were 654 intermediate and secondary students at Dalby State High School, which taught academic, commercial, industrial, home science and agricultural science courses. However, the intermediate section only operated from 1956 to 1963. Grade 8 became part of the high school in 1964; and in 1965 Grade 7 returned to the state school.

There were a number of changes and additions to the school in the late 1950s. In 1956–57 a highset timber school building with timber floor trusses (Block C in 2016) was added, at a slight angle, to the west end of the intermediate wing. Around this time the library/reading room space at the east end of the intermediate wing was converted into a teachers room and store.

Block C represented an evolution of the DPW's standard 1950s design, replacing the proliferation of stumps in the understorey with a timber truss that spanned the width of the classroom and provided an unimpeded play space. This type was also often fitted with clerestory windows above the verandah roof. The building at Dalby was designed to have six classrooms, each 24 by 24 feet (7.3 by 7.3 m), with a cloakroom between the fourth and fifth (from the east) classrooms, and a northern verandah. However, the two western classrooms and cloakroom of Block C were not built by mid-1957, and the westernmost classroom was not added until 1958, when two additional classrooms were also added under the west end of the block. In the semi-enclosed understory of Block C, drinking troughs were located along the southern wall, and a raised concrete platform was located at the east end.

An entrance link, with stairs up to the northern verandahs, filled the angle between the intermediate wing and Block C. This entrance was constructed in brick and had a skillion roof, and glazed double doors flanked by fixed glazing. The reinforced concrete slab floor extended outside to the south and was surrounded by boiler-plate flower boxes (not extant in 2016). Two brick flower boxes were also created to the rear (north) of the entrance link, and the western box survives in 2016. The original fan-shaped awning has since been replaced by a rectangular awning (post- January 2013).

Entry to the school has changed over time. A 1957 plan shows a pathway running directly from "Dalby-Kogan Road" (the Warrego Highway) to the link between Blocks D and C, which was labelled "proposed entrance". The caption read "Essential classroom accommodation has been provided here without the architectural emphasis to be derived from entrance and other features such as have been planned for this school." This plan also shows an entrance from Nicholson Street, east of the intermediate wing - about where the current pedestrian entrance is.

The pathway (not discernible in 2016) from the Warrego Highway to the entrance link is visible in a 1961 aerial photograph, as is a path (extant in 2016) from the intermediate wing to the corner of the Warrego Highway and Nicholson Street. The current metal arch at the corner, which reads "DALBY STATE HIGH SCHOOL", may date from this period, although the concrete base under the arch was added after 2007.

Other improvements at Dalby SHS in the 1950s included tennis courts, extant southwest of Block C by October 1958, and by this time there were also two toilet blocks north of the vocational training wing, and a school oval to the northeast.

The Queensland Government continued its focus on vocational education during the 1950s and 1960s. New standard types were developed including a brick veneer, concrete slab-on-ground and steel portal frame structure for manual training in 1958. A new manual training building (Block J in 2016) was built in late 1958–9, north of the west end of Block C, linked to the latter by a covered way. The brick veneer vocational building at Dalby contained a staffroom, switch room and store in a skillion roofed section at the north end, with two woodwork rooms and then two sheet metal rooms to the south (each 30 by 25 feet (9.1 by 7.6 m)), and a passageway along the west side. The roof was a low gable with clerestory windows between the passage roof and the main roof. There were awning windows on the east side. The portal frames were to be of concrete or steel (the latter was used) and the wall cladding of face brick and metal. The school complex now formed a "U" shape, angled slightly inwards at the top (north).

A new administration building (Block F in 2016), also built in late 1958–59, was linked by a curved covered way to the lower level of the old administration section. Block F originally consisted of a library and passageway at the south end, a lobby, and then a principal's office and store. The building was brick veneer with a low gable roof of corrugated iron. There were paved areas either side of the building, and a cover was added over the paving at the front entrance c.1959. In the former administration section north of the intermediate wing, the assistant teachers room was expanded to absorb the old principal's office.

At the time of the construction of Block J and Block F, the DPW noted that as 'one of the first of the new High Schools, Dalby suffered from the demand for austerity inescapable at that time, but each succeeding addition effects marked improvement and the buildings are gaining aesthetically in the process. The most recent additions add the weight of bricks and mortar in such judicious degree that the "temporary" atmosphere of earlier years is being displaced by a new academic atmosphere of controlled vistas and scholastic dignity.' The new administration building also provided "a permanent entrance to the school".

Dalby State High School continued to require additions and extensions during the 1960s-70s. In late 1961 Australia's first commercial oilfield was discovered at Moonie, southwest of Dalby. Although a hoped-for refinery at Dalby never eventuated, the town received some economic benefits. As local dairy farming declined from the 1960s, beef cattle replaced cows, and Dalby also became the centre of Australia's largest reception, distribution and processing centre for grains. In 1963 Dalby had a population of 7500, with 2365 school pupils (at the state school, state high school, St Columba's Convent and the Christian Brothers College).

In 1960–1 a 40-foot (12 m) addition was made to the west end of the original manual training block (Block A in 2016), consisting of an agricultural science classroom and storeroom. A general purpose workroom, change room with shower, plus a store, were built immediately underneath. The remainder of the manual training block was converted to domestic science, with a kitchen and dressmaking room. The former wood machinery room at the east end became a dining room, and the former teachers room at the west end, adjacent to the new extension, became a rest/fitting room.

New toilet and shower blocks, connected to the original vocational training wing by a covered way, were added north of the school buildings c. 1961, and c. 1962 a 72-foot (22 m) addition was made to the west end of Block B, then known as the "science wing". The extension included a physics demonstration room; physics store room, and physics laboratory.

By 1962 the room at the east end of the intermediate wing was a classroom, and Block J's rooms were labelled as (from south to north) two drawing rooms, then metalwork, then woodwork. In 1965 a tuckshop was built under the east end of the original domestic science block (Block A in 2016), and c.1968 a new science block was built east of the toilet blocks and Block A. By this time, Block E also existed north of Block A.

By 1971 a new amenities block had been added northeast of the toilet blocks and by this time the school appears to have had access to a recreation area north of the railway line. Although this land belonged to Napier Bros Limited from 1975, it remained as grass playing fields until c.2003.

In 1972 Block F was reconfigured, when the library was divided into a sick bay, deputy principal and principal's offices, and the former principal's office at the northeast end of the building was allocated to a clerk-typist. The walls of the former principal's office were pushed southwest into the lobby area, while the adjacent store room was altered and also extended southwest into the lobby area, with a small kitchenette formed at the northeast end of the storeroom. The same year a boys locker room was added to the understory of Block B, and a girls locker room was established in the ground floor of the entrance link between Block C and the former intermediate wing, and the flower beds under the entrance awning were removed at this time.

By 1975 there was a "great hall" near the western corner of the school, and a library north of E block; the 1961 toilet blocks had been replaced by extending of the 1971 amenities block, and there were demountable classrooms west of J block and basketball courts northeast of the 1968 science block. In late 1976 plans were drawn for a new locker room and two more classrooms (these were not extant in 2016, and may not have been built) to the understory of Block C, east of the existing two classrooms; while the entrance link between Block C and the former intermediate wing was converted into a storeroom, and a sports store and animal store were added under the 1950s section of Block B. By this time most of the western building of the original vocational training wing was no longer indicated on plans, presumably meaning it had been demolished.

The reason was a fire in April 1976, which had caused $100,000 in damage to the school, and a new building (constituting the western half of Block A in 2016) was constructed in 1977. This replaced all but the easternmost part of the original manual training block. The internal corridor leading from the covered way was moved west, into the remaining section of the manual training block, which was also used to form part of a new textile store and laundry room. At this time the original domestic science block was formed into two textile rooms, with a store and two fitting rooms between them, and the partitions for the small rooms at each end of the block were removed, along with the windows at the east end of the block.

Changes in room use also occurred from the late 1970s into the 1980s. In 1978 the old administration rooms north of the former intermediate wing were converted into boys and girl's health rooms, with obscure glass windows, while the former health services room downstairs became the guidance officer's room. In 1983 the science room at the west end of the original section of Block B was converted to a computer room, while the wall between the former store room and assistant teachers room was removed, creating an annexe to the west of the computer room. In the late 1980s Block J's southernmost two rooms were converted to Graphics rooms, with a woodwork room and a metalwork room to the north, and the staff room to the north became a store room.

By 2016 a number of other buildings had been added to the school, including a music block (c. 1987) northwest of Block C, and a new manual block northwest of Block J by 1990; a new home economics block west of Block E, with new tennis courts further west, and a new administration building northeast of Block F by 1998; and a small building north of Block E by 2004. In 2011 a trade training centre was added northwest of the hall, and by 2013 there was a new building northeast of the 1960s science block and the library had been extended. A Year 7 building was constructed west of the music block in 2014. In 2016 Block J was renovated, with new interior linings, new windows to existing openings, and new doorways to the eastern side.

The size of the school was slightly reduced in 1996, when the western corner was excised into the road reserve to create a carpark, to the school's current 7.6 hectares (19 acres). The Dalby Agricultural College, which opened in 1979 just northeast of the town, was acquired by Dalby State High School in 2011, becoming its "Bunya Campus" with a residential college and working farm. In 2016, Dalby SHS continues to operate from its original site on Nicholson Street. The school is important to the area as a focus for the community, and generations of students have been taught there.

== Description ==
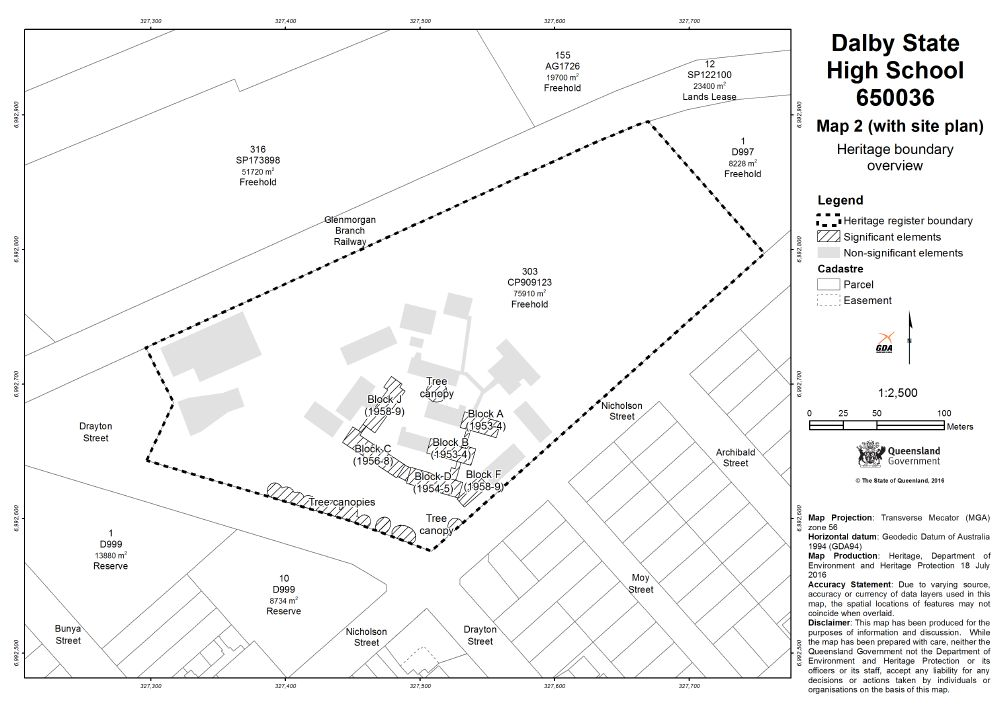
Site map, 2016

Dalby State High School occupies a 7.6-hour (27 ks) levelled site that is located approximately 600 metres (2,000 ft) northwest of the Dalby CBD. The site is primarily accessed from Nicholson Street (southeast); and is bounded by the Warrego Highway (southwest), the Dalby–Glenmorgan railway line (northwest) and a light-industrial property (northeast). The school retains a complex of six 1950s buildings (and part of a seventh), located in the southeast corner of the site and linked by covered walkways, with a playing field to the northeast and perimeter shade trees.

The buildings within the school complex which are heritage-listed are:

- Block A (eastern end) – one 1953–1954 Boulton & Paul prefabricated timber vocational building (formerly used as a domestic science building), and a section of a second Boulton & Paul prefabricated timber vocational building (1954–1955, formerly used as a manual training building)
- Block B (eastern end) – a 1953–1954 Boulton and Paul prefabricated timber school building
- Block C – a 1956–1958 timber school building with timber floor trusses
- Block D – a 1954–1955 highset timber school building with semi-enclosed stair (formerly used as the intermediate school)
- Block F – a 1958–1959 (former) administration building and library
- Block J – a 1958–1959 brick veneer vocational building

Evidence of early site planning of the school grounds remains and is typical of Queensland schools during the 1950s, with the long, narrow, buildings linked by covered ways around open-ended courtyard play spaces. Highset, timber-framed Blocks A (north), B (centre) and D (south) have north-facing verandahs and are arranged in a staggered, parallel formation, orientated slightly east of north, linked by an axis of highset covered walkways. Adjacent, Block C is orientated slightly further east and is connected to the western end of Block D by a lowset entranceway. Blocks J and F are single storey brick-veneer buildings; Block J to the northwest is at a right angle to Block C, and Block F is next to the main entrance and faces Nicholson Street.

=== Boulton & Paul prefabricated buildings (Blocks A & B) ===
Blocks A and B are long, highset, prefabricated timber-framed buildings with gable roofs that continue over the north-facing verandahs. A first floor covered walkway connects Block A with Block B to the south. Both blocks have later extensions to the west (Block A, 1977; and Block B, 1962), which are not the Boulton & Paul type and are not of state cultural heritage significance.

The building exteriors are clad in timber chamferboards, including the southern and eastern sides of the understoreys, with the Boulton & Paul sections clearly distinguishable from later sections by vertical timber strips that define each panel of the prefabricated wall units on the first floor. The eastern end of Block B is clad in modern corrugated metal.

Large areas of timber awning windows, with fanlights, line the southern Boulton & Paul walls, with brackets attached to the mullions and supporting the overhanging eaves. The verandahs have timber floors, continuous timber posts, flat-sheeted raked ceilings and enclosed balustrades, which are either clad in chamferboards (Block A) or profiled metal-clad bag racks (Block B).

The Block A-B walkway aligns with the similar Block B-D walkway to the south. The highset covered walkways have continuous timber posts, railed balustrades, timber floors and flat roofs with flat-sheeted ceilings.

The understoreys have concrete floors, and combine open play space with enclosed areas for various uses. The floor structure of the classrooms above is exposed, with timber bearers supported on concrete piers. Windows on the eastern and southern sides are a combination of louvred (Block A) and latticed (Blocks A & B).

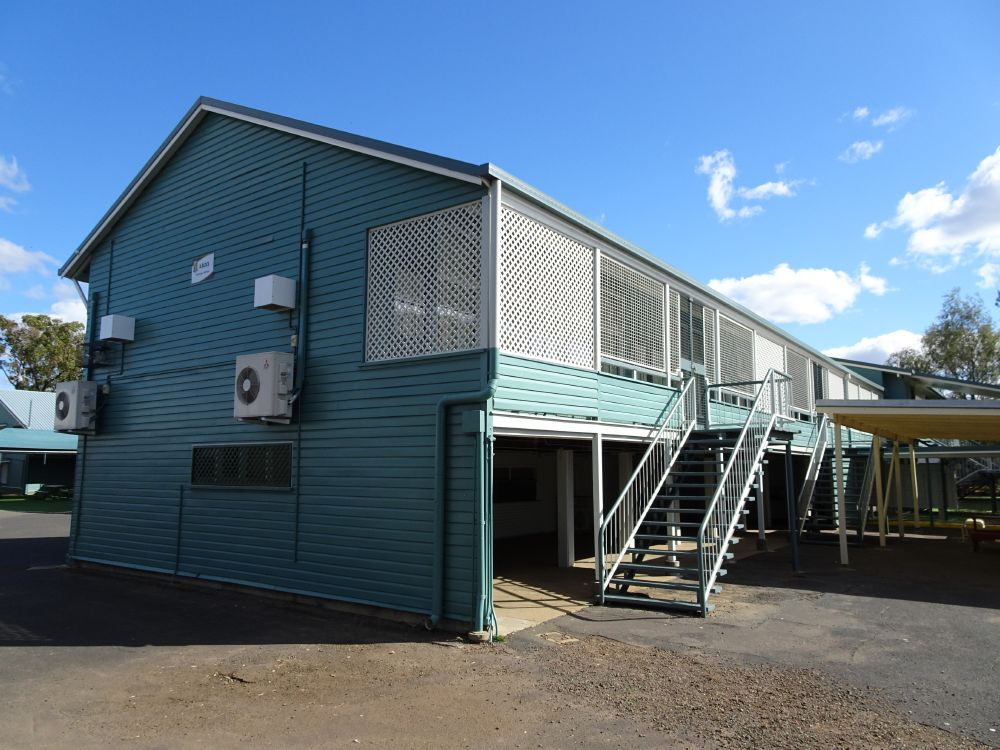
Block A, east end

==== Block A ====
Block A includes one Boulton & Paul building to the east, and part of another Boulton & Paul building to the west, and retains its original chamferboard-clad northeast corner verandah balustrade, and bulkheads approximately halfway along the verandah indicate the location of the former domestic science laundry. The verandah is accessed by modern metal-framed stairs, and is enclosed with lattice and metal mesh above the balustrade. Windows along the verandah wall have been replaced with modern aluminium-framed sliding sashes, with fanlights. Classrooms have half-glazed, boarded doors.

The first floor contains two classrooms to the east of the covered way, and two offices to the west, which have a hallway containing steps up to the adjacent extension. The passageway connecting the covered way with the verandah has been relocated to the west, into the remaining section of the second Boulton & Paul building (former manual training), around modern store rooms. An opening formed in the partition between the classrooms has a modern concertina door. The classroom walls are flat-sheeted, with rounded cover strips, and the ceilings have been relined lined with plasterboard.

The understorey contains a tuckshop (1965–77), office and store rooms. The walls are clad in a combination of timber chamferboards, V-jointed (VJ) tongue-and-groove (T&G) boards, timber battens and flat sheeting, and the interiors are lined with flat sheeting, some areas with rounded cover strips.

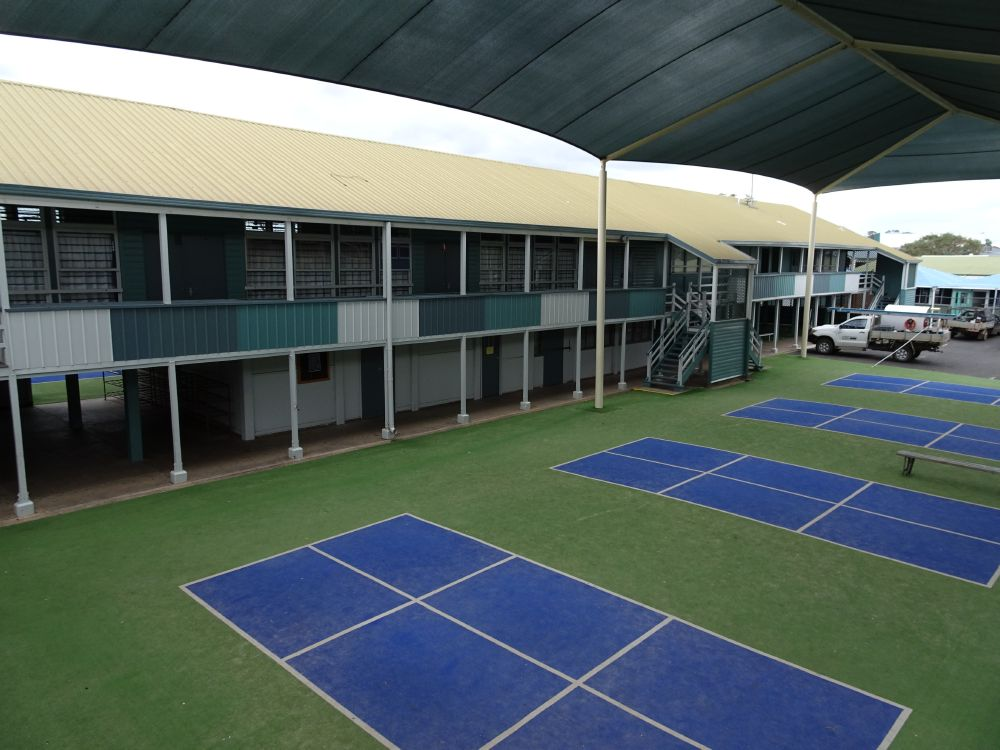
B block, north side

==== Block B ====
Block B has timber stairs positioned at either end of the verandah, with the understoreys of the stairs clad in chamferboards. The stairs have railed timber balustrades, which are also retained on adjacent sections of the verandah. The verandah walls have double-hung sash windows, with awning fanlights, and modern flush-finish doors.

The first floor contains three classrooms and two store rooms to the west of the covered way, and a staff room to the east. Classroom interiors have flat-sheeted walls, with rounded cover strips, and modern suspended ceilings.

The understorey contains a classroom and student café, separated by a store room. The enclosures are clad and lined with flat sheeting, with cover strips to the interiors.

==== Later extensions ====
The later western extensions are similar in form to the original buildings, but are not of state cultural heritage significance.

The Block A (1977) extension is set slightly higher, and has a wider verandah. The understorey is enclosed with face brick; a narrow passageway separates it from the 1950s section.

The Block B (1962) extension has a flat-sheeted verandah wall with vertical louvres over fixed glazing. The understorey is partly open.

=== Highset timber school building (Block D) ===
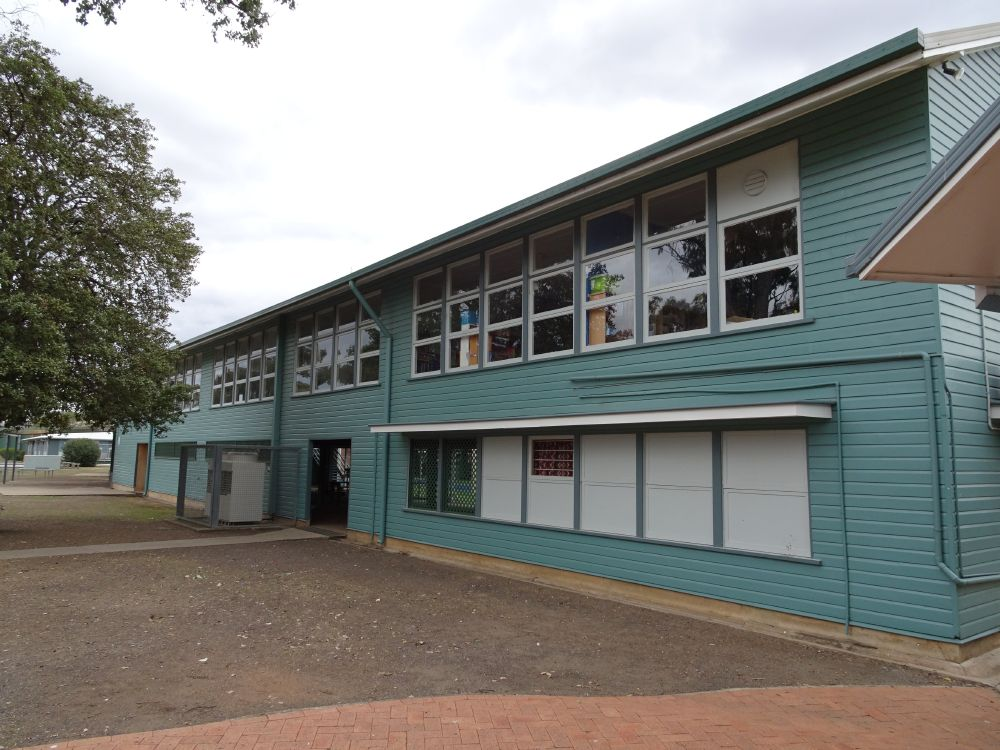
Block D, south side

Block D is a long, highset, gable-roofed building with semi-enclosed stairs at either end of the north-facing verandah. The exterior is clad in chamferboards, including the stairs and the eastern, southern and western sides of the understorey. An original gable-roofed projection to the north is at a right angle to the main building and connects with the covered walkway to Block B. An adjacent ground floor covered walkway connects with Block F to the east.

The southern wall has large areas of timber awning windows and the verandah wall has double-hung timber sashes, both with fanlights. The verandah has full height (continuous) timber posts, timber floors, raked ceilings and enclosed bag rack balustrades, which are clad in profiled metal. Classroom doors are half-glazed and boarded.

The first floor contains five classrooms and a staff room, with the three central classrooms divided by original timber-panelled folding partitions. The interiors are lined with flat sheeting, with rounded cover strips above dado height and on the ceilings. The northern projection has double-hung timber sash windows, and contains adjoining office and store rooms.

The understorey combines open play space and enclosed areas for a staff lounge (western end) and store room (northern projection). The floor structure of the classrooms above is exposed, with the timber bearers supported on concrete piers. The understorey floor is concrete.

A lowset, skillion-roofed uniform shop (former entranceway, 1956) connects the western end of Block D with Block C. The walls are brick, with fixed glazing and battened sheeting flanking a modern flush-finish door. A concrete slab with faceted corners projects south of the entranceway, and has a rectangular modern skillion-roofed awning over. An enclosed cantilevered walkway along the northern side connects the first floor verandahs of the two adjoining buildings; it is clad in corrugated metal and has high-level fixed windows. The interior is flat-sheeted and the ground floor has a modern suspended ceiling.

=== Timber school building (Block C) ===
Block C is a long, gable-roofed building supported on open timber floor trusses. Built in stages, it comprises: four highset classrooms and a cloakroom (1956) at the eastern end; a single highset classroom to the immediate west (1957); and a single first floor classroom and two ground floor classrooms at the western end (1958).

The exterior is clad in weatherboards, including the eastern and southern sides of the understory. The southern wall has large banks of awning windows along the first floor, and the ground floor classrooms. High-level window openings on the southern side of the eastern understorey are lined with lattice. The two-storey end wall and piers supporting the 1958 extension's verandah are face brick. The gable roof of the 1958 extension continues over its verandah, while the earlier verandah has a lower, flatter roof, supported on continuous metal posts and set below clerestory lights on the verandah wall.

The verandah is accessed via metal-framed stairs, and has timber floors and bag rack balustrades that are clad externally with profiled metal. Classroom doors are half-glazed, and double-hung sash windows, with fanlights, line the chamferboard-clad verandah and northern understory walls. The western classrooms are distinguishable from the earlier classrooms by their narrower verandah chamferboards.

The classrooms are separated by fixed partitions, with 2-light paneled timber doors at the southern end. The interior walls and ceilings are flat-sheeted, with rounded cover strips (above dado height on the first floor). Classrooms retain cupboards under sloping whiteboards.

The understory features exposed timber floor trusses, visible in both the classrooms and the open play space at the eastern end. Block C is connected to Block J to the north by a ground-floor covered walkway.

=== Brick veneer vocational building (Block J) ===
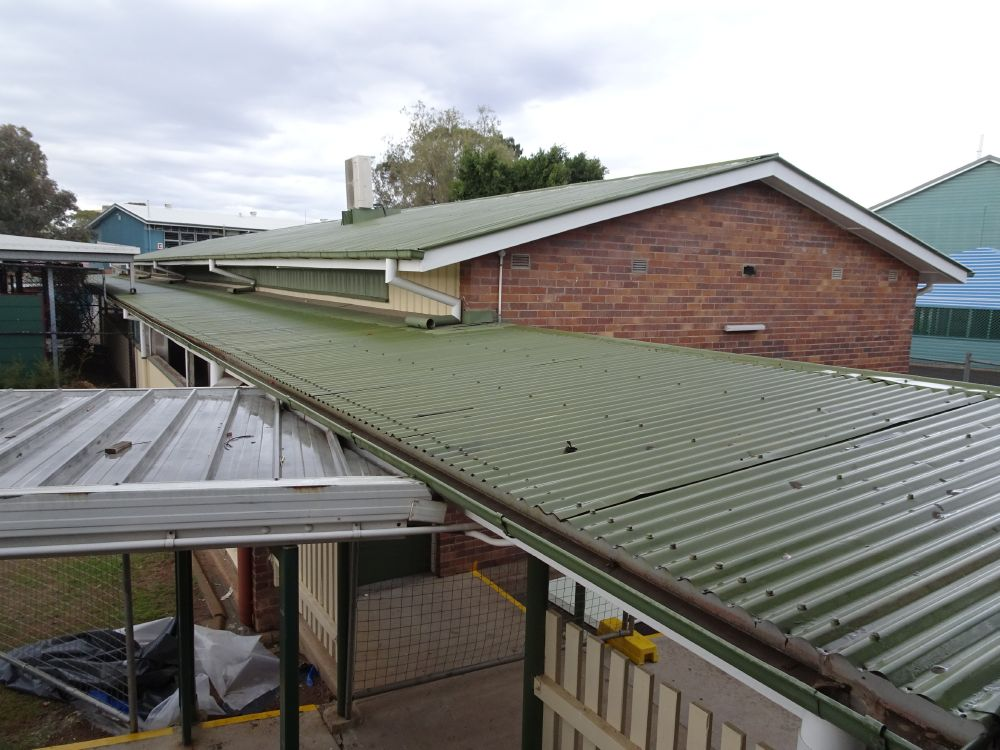
Block J, south-west end, looking north-east from Block C

Block J is a long, single story, brick veneer building with an open web steel portal frame. The building retains its four classrooms, with a passageway along the western side that aligns with the covered way connecting with Block C. A lowest former storage/office wing surrounds the northwest corner.

The low-pitched gable roof of the wing and the skillion roof of the passage are set lower than the gable-roofed core, with clerestory lights between. The roofs are clad in corrugated metal. The eastern and western sides of the building are clad in profiled metal below sill height. Windows on the eastern side of the classrooms comprise modern aluminum-framed sliding sashes, with a continuous fanlight, shaded by an exterior high-level louvred metal awning. New doors have been added to the eastern side of the classrooms. Windows on the western side of the passageway, the clerestory and the wing have been removed (at the time of inspection in mid-2016) for replacement.

The interior has been altered, with the removal of some walls, and the addition of some new partitions. The classrooms have modern suspended ceilings and walls sheeted in plasterboard, concealing and enclosing the open web steel portal frame. The fabric added in 2016 is not of cultural heritage significance.

=== Administration building (Block F) ===
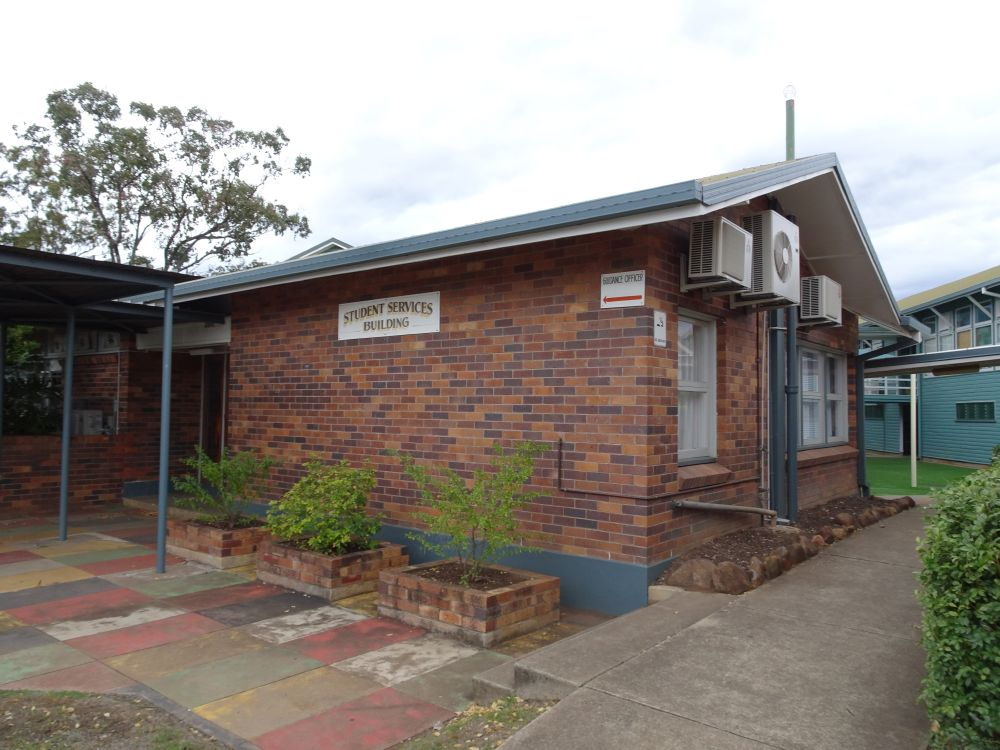
Block F (former administration building), north-east corner

Block F is a long, single story, brick veneer building with a low-pitched gable roof. In 2016 it is used as a student services building and comprises: a central entrance lobby and waiting area; two large and one small offices / meeting rooms to the southwest (former open-plan library), with a passageway along the northwest side; and two small office / meeting rooms (former Principal's Office), and a store room and kitchenette (part of former waiting room and an original store room), to the northeast.

The main entrance from Nicholson Street is indicated by a flat-roofed metal-framed canopy and a stencilled, poly-chrome painted concrete slab; it has stained timber-framed wired-glass doors, with sidelights. A ground floor covered walkway connects the western side of the lobby with Block D to the west.

The southwest section has banks of timber-framed awning windows on the southeast side (with fanlights) and along the passageway (clad above externally in profiled metal). Some of the timber-framed awning windows on the northeast wall have been replaced with metal-framed sliding windows.

The interior walls and ceilings are predominantly flat-sheeted, with rounded cover strips. The lobby interior combines flat-sheeted and face brick walls. The wall between the two large southwest offices (1972) is clad in stained timber-veneer. The doors are a combination of painted, stained timber-veneer and half-glazed.

=== Landscape elements ===
The school grounds are well established, with sporting facilities including a generously sized playing field/sports oval at the eastern end of the site, with perimeter shade trees.

The school buildings are set back from the Warrego Highway, with an open lawn between. A row of mature trees line the Warrego Highway boundary, the oldest being closest to the corner, and a mature bottle tree (Brachychiton rupestris) is situated adjacent to Nicholson Street. A mature tree is also located north of the west end of Block A's 1970s extension.

The entrance to Block F retains an area of stenciled, poly-chrome painted concrete slab. The main entrance from Nicholson Street, northeast of Block F, is landscaped with modern pavers and garden beds that contain a range of shrubs.

A decorative metal archway (possibly pre-1961), set on modern concrete plinths, frames a pedestrian entrance from the corner of the Warrego Highway and Nicholson Street, featuring "DALBY STATE HIGH SCHOOL" in metal lettering.

The splayed open courtyard spaces between the 1950s buildings, which were formed as part of the 1950s planning, are sealed in bitumen, with large areas finished with modern synthetic turf and sheltered by modern open shade structures.

== Heritage listing ==
Dalby State High School was listed on the Queensland Heritage Register on 19 August 2016 having satisfied the following criteria.

It is important in demonstrating the evolution of Queensland's history.

Dalby State High School (established in 1954) is important in demonstrating the evolution of state education and its associated architecture in Queensland. The place retains excellent, representative examples of standard government designs that were architectural responses to prevailing government educational philosophies; set in landscaped grounds with sporting facilities.

It is also important for demonstrating the pattern of provision of secondary education across Queensland in the 1950s, as it incorporates all the features associated with secondary education – a high school, an intermediate school and vocational training facilities.

The layout of the administration and classroom buildings, the covered links between them and associated open spaces, reflect the early 1950s introduction of master planning, and the subsequent shift from grid-like layouts around a central axis towards more organic planning strategies, which provided for ordered growth from a nucleus.

The Boulton & Paul Buildings (1953–55) demonstrate the introduction and adoption of imported prefabricated systems by the Queensland Government in response to acute building material shortages and population growth in the post-World War II period. The former domestic science block also reflects the Queensland Government's focus on vocational training as a way of ensuring the state's economic prosperity.

The highest timber school building with semi-enclosed stair (1954–55) and Timber school building with timber floor trusses (1956–8) represent the evolution of Department of Public Works designs during the mid to late 1950s, based on features of the Boulton & Paul buildings.

The former administration building and brick veneer vocational building (both 1958–59) represent a move away from the austerity of the early 1950s to a more permanent aesthetic, incorporating masonry elements. The former administration building, with its entry canopy and poly-chrome painted concrete paving, provided a formal entrance to the school.

The brick veneer vocational building also represents the Queensland Government's ongoing emphasis on vocational training.

The place is important in demonstrating the principal characteristics of a particular class of cultural places.

Dalby State High School is important in demonstrating the principal characteristics of a Queensland state high school of the 1950s. These include its 1950s site planning; range of highest or lowest timber-framed and brick veneer buildings of standard and individual designs; and a generous, landscaped site with shade trees, and assembly and sports areas.

Following 1950s site planning principles, the school includes six 1950s buildings (and part of a seventh) that all contribute to the general concept of long, narrow buildings linked around open ended courtyard assembly and play spaces. The four earliest buildings are arranged in a staggered parallel formation of three wings, linked by an axis of covered walkways, while the three later buildings are arranged and linked in a more organic manner.

The former administration building; the former entrance link between the buildings addressing the Warrego Highway; and the covered links between the buildings, are characteristic of 1950s school design in Queensland, providing a ground level administration facility connected to the school by a covered walkway, with other walkways linking the classroom blocks.

The highest timber teaching buildings are intact examples of their type and retain their character with some covered play space under, timber-framed, lightweight construction; gable roofs, and north-facing verandahs for circulation, large banks of south-facing timber-framed awning windows, with fanlights, and 24 feet (7.3 m) wide classrooms.

The Boulton & Paul Buildings also clearly demonstrate the characteristics of prefabricated buildings through the expression of their modular construction in the external cladding.

The connected highest timber school building with semi-enclosed stair and the Timber school building with timber floor trusses demonstrate two iterations of the Department of Public Work's standard designs: the first on concrete piers; and the second incorporating timber floor trusses for unimpeded play space. The building on trusses also retains clerestory lighting above its northern verandah roof.

The place has a strong or special association with a particular community or cultural group for social, cultural or spiritual reasons.

Schools have always played an important part in Queensland communities. They typically retain significant and enduring connections with former pupils, parents, and teachers; provide a venue for social interaction and volunteer work; and are a source of pride, symbolizing local progress and aspirations.

Dalby State High School has a strong and ongoing association with the Dalby community. It was established in 1954 and generations of Dalby students have been taught there. The place is important for its contribution to the educational development of Dalby and as a focus for the community.

== See also ==
- History of state education in Queensland
- List of schools in Darling Downs
