= Dalby Fire Station =

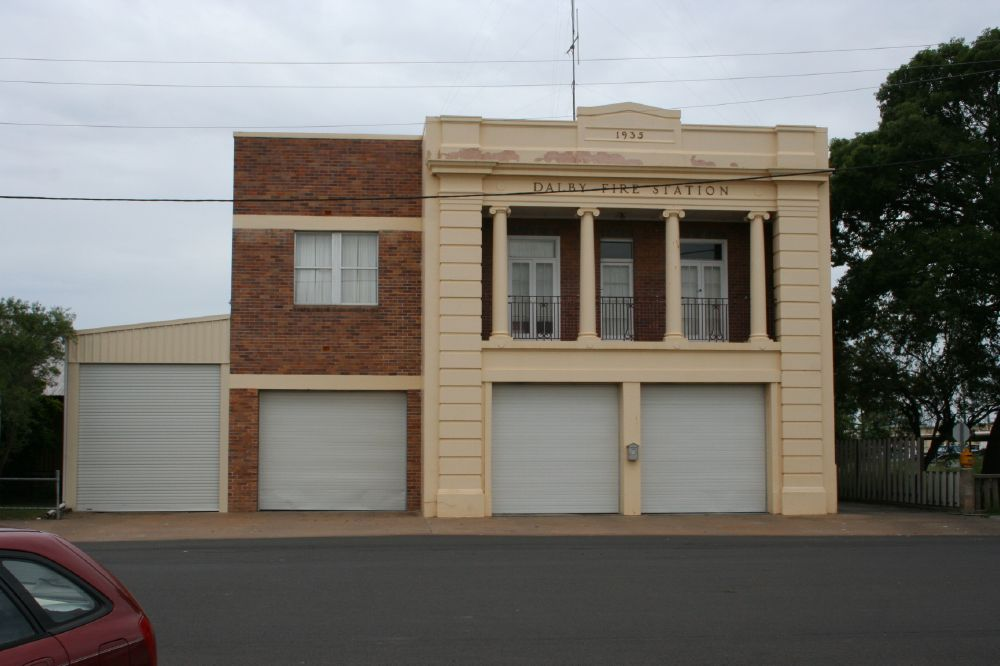
- Dalby Fire Station, 2010

- Location within Queensland Location within Australia
- 27.1798°S 151.2667°E
- Location: 21 New Street, Dalby, Western Downs Region, Queensland, Australia

History
- Design period: 1919–1930s (interwar period)
- Built: 1935

Site notes
- Architect: Matthew Williamson
- Architectural style: Classicism

Queensland Heritage Register
- Official name: Dalby Fire Station
- Type: state heritage (built)
- Designated: 8 October 2010
- Reference no.: 602754
- Significant period: 1935–2010
- Significant components: fire station
- Builders: George Ficken

Dalby Fire Station is a heritage-listed fire station at 21 New Street, Dalby, Western Downs Region, Queensland, Australia. It was designed by Matthew Williamson and built in 1935 by George Ficken. It was added to the Queensland Heritage Register on 8 October 2010.

== History ==
The Dalby Fire Station is located in the town of Dalby, about 80 kilometres (50 mi) north-west of Toowoomba in south-east Queensland. A two-storey, predominantly brick structure, the core of the station was built in 1935 to a design by Toowoomba architect Matthew Williamson. Located on the northern edge of the town's business centre the building addresses New Street and is equidistant from Cunningham Street, the main street, and the Bunya Highway (or Condamine Street) as it runs through the town. It and its associated structures occupy a 2023 square metre allotment backing onto Starlings Lane. Cunningham Street features a number of significant commercial buildings including the Dalby Town Council Chambers and Offices, the former police station and courthouse complex and St John's Anglican Church. The 1935 brick fire station replaced a 1920 timber structure and was extended in 1953 to provide an extra garage and workshop on the ground floor and an upstairs recreation area. Further extensions along the rear of the building were undertaken in 1976.

The town of Dalby was laid out by Surveyor EO Moriaty in 1852; part of the expansion of pastoral activities on the Darling Downs. Due to problems with flood levels, a second town survey was completed the following year and the Town Reserve declared in 1855. The Town of Dalby was gazetted as a municipality on 29 August 1863. The extension of the Western railway line to Dalby in 1868 led to a boom that only deflated when the line was extended west in 1877. Further prosperity occurred as a result of the Agricultural Land Purchase Act 1894, which opened up substantial tracts of land previously held by the early pastoralists. This led to closer settlement around Dalby and its development into a major regional centre.

The first Dalby Fire Brigade was formed in 1882, but was short-lived because of the failure of local insurance companies to contribute to its financial support. The second Dalby Fire Brigade was initiated under the Fire Brigade Amendment Act 1902 at a meeting in March 1915, and its board was gazetted on 24 July. By October 1916, the fledgling brigade had received its first government subsidy and a manual fire engine was purchased the following year. Land for the fire brigade was acquired in New Street (Allot 3 Section 6) in January 1920. It had been originally taken up in 1863 by John Donovan and transferred to local butcher James Ryan in 1885. It is conjectured that the cottage now utilised as the fire station office was built in 1889 when Ryan took out a mortgage on his property. The land was transferred to Ryan's daughter Margaret in 1910, and in 1919, about six years after she had married and moved to Sydney, she placed the property in the hands of trustees Dalby Mayor James Duncan Morris and Alderman Walter Robertson Hunter, both fire brigade board members. The agreement allowed for the board to build on the site and take out mortgages to finance any improvements. Tenders were called for construction of this first fire station in January 1920 and building proceeded at a cost of £95. A simple timber garage with a galvanised iron gable roof was erected. Local builders Draney and Co were contracted to enlarge this building in 1923 to provide a board room, which eventually housed the new fire truck purchased six years later.

During the early 1930s the Dalby region experienced renewed growth following the eradication of the prickly pear cactus through the introduction of the Cactoblastis cactorum moth in 1925. The prickly pear had devastated the region from the late 19th century and its destruction led to the recovery of thousands of hectares of agricultural land and the Department of Public Lands reporting rapid expansion of agriculture, grazing and dairying around Dalby, Chinchilla and Miles.

After the 1932 state election of the Forgan-Smith Government, part of its funds were channelled into what were considered "sound" public projects providing long-term community benefit, rather than into short-term maintenance projects such as those funded through the Intermittent Relief Scheme. Projects funded directly by the Queensland Department of Public Works included additions to the Dalby School (1935), and a new courthouse and police station (1934). The town's stock of commercial and ecclesiastical buildings was also augmented at this time with: a Bank of New South Wales and National Bank (both no longer extant), the Dalby Olympic Swimming Pool, the Dalby Town Council Chambers and Offices, a Presbyterian Church, the Star Theatre (no longer extant) and a Catholic Presbytery (no longer extant).

The Fire Brigade Act of 1931 had allowed for boards to make by-laws and those devised by the Dalby Fire Brigade Board were gazetted in August 1934, providing administrative guidelines for the board and firemen. At the board meeting of June 1934, the secretary Harold Edward Thorley presented preliminary plans for a two-storey brick fire station, the estimated cost for which being between £2,500 and £2,800. In August 1934 Toowoomba architect Matthew Williamson produced the final plans for the fire station. Williamson's other Dalby projects included the Presbyterian Church (1933), the Star Theatre (1936, no longer extant) and a number of shops and private dwellings. He was also responsible for numerous projects in Toowoomba, including the Trades Hall (1934) in Russell Street, as well as buildings in Miles, Crows Nest and Oakey.

In November 1934, it was reported that a loan had been secured from the Commonwealth Bank, when the tender of £2,482/8/- submitted by local builder George Ficken was accepted. Before construction was completed, the Forgan-Smith government approved for local authorities and other local bodies (such as hospital, harbour and fire brigade boards) a reduction of 1% in the interest rates of all loans with rates over 4%. This presumably aided the construction of other fire stations and community infrastructure across the state during the 1930s.

The Dalby Fire Station was formally opened on Saturday 16 November 1935 by the Home Secretary Ned Hanlon. It was 51 feet 8 inches (15.75 m) long and 32 feet 4 inches (9.86 m) wide and built on concrete foundations and footings with concrete floors on a base of broken stone to the appliance rooms and timber flooring elsewhere on the ground floor. The structure comprised some rolled steel and reinforced concrete components, including continuous wall lintels. The ground floor accommodated two fire appliances behind folding timber doors with a recreation room and open timber stairway at the rear. On the interior of this level there was silky oak interior wall panelling to a height of 6 feet 6 inches (1.98 m). The upper level had a kitchen, living room, lounge room, three bedrooms, a bathroom and balcony to the street. Fibro sheeting and plaster variously lined the walls of the upper level, with ornamental cornices. The fireplaces on both levels were detailed with Wunderlich bricks and all windows were timber. The external brick walls were solid on the ground floor and included a cavity above the wall lintel. There were glazed brick soldier courses to openings on the first floor and glazed brick sills to the front of the building. The original paintwork to the concrete walls was to be lime wash tinted with burnt sienna, while the lettering on the front was to be finished with gold leaf.

Prior to the completion of the Dalby Fire Station in 1935 only four other two-storey, brick fire stations had been built in the state's capital, Brisbane. The sole survivor of these is the 1927 Albion Fire Station, which along with a station at South Brisbane was a part of the network rationalisations undertaken after 1921 by the Metropolitan Fire Brigades Board. During the interwar years a number of two-storey fire stations were also built in Brisbane of timber and fibro, including: an upgrade to the Ithaca Fire Station in 1928; a new Yeronga Fire Station in 1934; then three to the same plan: Coorparoo Fire Station in 1935, Nundah Fire Station in 1936 and Wynnum Fire Station in 1938. Generally the layout of all these structures provided accommodation for fire appliances on the ground floor, and a recreation room, kitchen, bathroom and dormitory space, and accommodation for officers and their families on the first floor. The 1935 Dalby station was smaller than some of the Brisbane stations, with space for two fire appliances and a recreation room on the ground floor and living quarters for the chief officer and his family on the upper floor. Accommodation for firemen was provided in a three bedroom cottage on the site built using materials from the 1920 to 1929 fire station garage.

By 1949 it was evident that a larger station was required at Dalby to house a new fire engine, and that more bedrooms were needed in the firemen's quarters. Funding was acquired in stages over the next few years from both government and private sources. The extension was built in brick along the north-western side of the fire station during 1953. It included a third engine bay and workshop on the ground floor and a recreation area on the first floor. The new addition was 60 by 16 feet (18.3 by 4.9 m). Additions were also made to the timber firemen's quarters. At this time the adjacent timber low-set cottage was occupied by the mechanic/caretaker.

The property owner Margaret Sara (née Ryan) died in Broken Hill in 1953 and the property was transferred to the Dalby Fire Brigade Board on 11 May of the following year.

In an effort to better co-ordinate the management of fire brigades across Queensland, the Queensland Fire Brigades Boards Association was formed in 1962–63. The Fire Brigade Act 1964 legislated for Fire Boards to become Body Corporates. The first Queensland Chief Fire Inspector was appointed and the State Fire Services Council was formed as the state moved towards the standardisation of equipment and facilities.

The Dalby Fire Brigade continued to upgrade its equipment, with a new fire engine in 1956/7, another in 1965, two-way radios in 1966, and a salvage vehicle in 1967/8. A concrete block smoke room was built in 1970. In mid-1975 tenders were called for further additions to the rear of the main station building to provide a storeroom, board facilities, toilets and office accommodation for the regional fire safety officer (recently appointed) and the chief officer. Dalby builders, JR Perry and Co, were awarded the contract at a cost of $35,974. The 14.7-by-5-metre (48 by 16 ft) extension was completed in mid-1976. Extensions to the fire tower were built in 1978 and a new fire engine was also purchased.

The Fire Services Act 1990 led to the amalgamation of a number of departments. The Metropolitan Fire Brigade Board ceased to exist after June 1990 and the management of the 21 metropolitan stations and the 81 fire boards across the state were amalgamated into the Queensland Fire Services. A further amendment to the Act in 1996 created the Fire and Rescue Authority. The Emergency Services Legislation Act 2001 dissolved this Authority and vested its assets with the Queensland Government.

The self-contained living areas on the first floor of the Dalby Fire Station continued to be occupied by the Chief Officer or Captain until the late 1990s. The cottage was occupied by one of the firemen until the mid-1990s. At that time it was restumped and ramps were added at the front, when it was converted into an area office of the Department of Community Safety's Queensland Fire and Rescue Service South Western Region. The former men's quarters were relocated to Rangemoore Winery in December 2000. The accommodation areas of the fire station are now used by visiting emergency services personnel, officers attending courses from regional towns as well as by visiting relieving officers. In 2009 a temporary garage was erected on the north-western side of the fire station to accommodate a new tanker appliance.

Dalby is now one of 42 fire stations in the South Western Region, which includes the major towns of Toowoomba and Warwick, and extends west through Cunnamulla and Quilpie to the border with the South Australia. It remains an operational auxiliary fire station, although no longer permanently houses fire brigade staff.

A desktop survey comparing the fire brigade and station files held by the Queensland State Archives, the current listing maintained by the Queensland Fire and Rescue Service of its fire stations, historical images featured on Picture Australia and current street views on Google Maps revealed that the station at Dalby is the oldest remaining regional fire station still in operation. Only one remaining interwar station was possibly constructed earlier, that at Warwick, however it is no longer in use. There appear to be three others remaining in operation in regional Queensland: at Innisfail (1937), Charleville (1938) and Gympie (1940). The six stations built before the Dalby and Warwick stations, those at Rockhampton, Barcaldine, Gladstone, Cunnamulla, Cairns and Maryborough) have all been demolished.

== Description ==
The Dalby Fire Station is located in the southern corner of a large land parcel addressing New Street about halfway between Cunningham Street to the south-east and the Highway to the north-west. Starlings Lane runs along the rear of the block.

The fire station building comprises a core (1935) constructed on reinforced concrete foundations with an upper structure combining elements of steel, reinforced concrete framing and brickwork. It has a gable roof behind a parapet on two sides. It has brick two-storey additions along its north-western side (1953) and its rear (1976), both of which have skillion roofs. A steel garage with skillion roof has been installed along its north-westernmost side and is not considered to be of cultural heritage significance.

The core's facade addressing New Street is symmetrical and employs painted cement-render in making its various classical motifs. It features twin garage doors on the ground floor flanked by rendered pilasters. On the first floor these pilasters flank a 1.8-metre (5 ft 11 in) wide balcony, the long opening to which is decorated by four tapered ionic columns and a wrought iron balustrade. The name of the building is displayed in raised lettering across the entablature and the date of construction, 1935, is featured in the parapet above. The exposed stretcher bond brickwork to the balcony is tuck pointed, while above the two French windows and single glazed door are soldier courses of glazed brick. Its floor is unpainted concrete. The central single-leaf door has twelve lights, while those either side of it have eight lights in each leaf. All these feature textured and semi-transparent glass, while the rectangular fanlights are clear glass.

The 1935 core is constructed with solid brick walls on the ground floor and cavity brick walls on the upper level, reflected in the varying brickwork bonds employed on the south-eastern side facade still visible: English bond below with headers picked out by dark colouring and stretcher bond above. Also on this facade a continuous concrete lintel separates the levels. The latter additions are completed in stretcher bond and also use continuous lintels.

The gable roof of the 1935 structure is clad in metal sheeting, falling to a parapet wall along the south-eastern side and to a central gutter on its north-western side, which also serves the skillion roof of the 1953 extension. The north-western side of this extension has a parapet. The original chimney pierces the gable roof of the 1935 core. Only one original six-light, double-hung timber window remains, internalised by the extent of the 1953 extension, while all others are double-hung aluminium. The lintels to these windows are largely rendered and painted. Access to the building is via a side door on the south-eastern facade or via a rear door facing Starlings Lane and the north east.

Inside the 1935 core a large area at the front houses two fire appliances with hooks, racks and shelves either side for equipment. To the rear of this space are a communications and operations office and a stairway leading from the north-eastern corner to the upper level. The stair has its original timber balustrade and has been enclosed underneath for storage. The office walls are lined with laminated board panelling, revealing only the outline of the original fireplace and chimney. Ceilings are 4.26 metres (14.0 ft) high and feature original timber cover strips over fibro sheeting, with decorative cornices and suspended fluorescent lighting. The 1976 rear extension houses a small office and ablution facilities on the ground floor, while the 1953 extension accommodates further space for a fire appliance and a workshop at the rear. In the garages the floors are painted concrete. A roll-a-door at the rear of the 1953 garage provides access to the rear of the allotment. An undercover parking space is provided immediately outside this door, under the 1976 first floor.

On the upper floor of the 1935 extension at the rear are a kitchen, living area, bathroom and toilet. At its front over the garage space are two bedrooms, one of which has been enlarged to include the corridor space that led to the balcony on New Street. The upper level of the 1953 extension contains bedroom and training spaces, while that from 1976 contains bedrooms and a balcony.

Other than the internal stair, access is gained to this upper floor balcony via an external steel staircase. The floor levels differ between the later extensions and the 1935 building core, the former being lower.

The fireplace in the upper level living room retains its original Wunderlich glazed brick and rendered concrete surround. The kitchen, bathroom and toilet fittings are not original. The front two bedrooms have built-in wardrobes, while the former third bedroom is used as a storeroom. All internal walls and ceilings are clad in fibrous cement sheeting. Ceilings throughout the upper level are 3.2 metres (10 ft) high. The areas on the first floor of the 1953 addition are accessed via doors cut out of the original window openings in the north-western wall of the 1935 building. The opening between the lounge and the training room has been widened to accommodate two six-light French doors with opaque textured glass.

Vehicular access is either via New Street along the north-eastern side of the fire station or through double gates on Starlings Lane.

== Heritage listing ==
Dalby Fire Station was listed on the Queensland Heritage Register on 8 October 2010 having satisfied the following criteria.

The place is important in demonstrating the evolution or pattern of Queensland's history.

The 1935 core of the Dalby Fire Station, comprising a two-storey brick, steel and concrete structure with a classically influenced street facade, is the oldest surviving, and longest operating, fire station in regional Queensland. The 1935 building core, with its 1953 and 1976 extensions, demonstrate the evolution of fire fighting services in the state's regional towns.

The place is important in demonstrating the principal characteristics of a particular class of cultural places.

The Dalby Fire Station demonstrates the principal characteristics of a regional interwar fire station including: a central location in the town; ground floor accommodation for the fire appliances and operational facilities; and first floor living accommodation for the chief fire officer. The 1935 Dalby Fire Station core and its 1953 and 1976 additions exemplify the evolving functions of a regional fire brigade which has operated continuously from this New Street site since 1920.
