= Dalby, Queensland =

Dalby
- Town
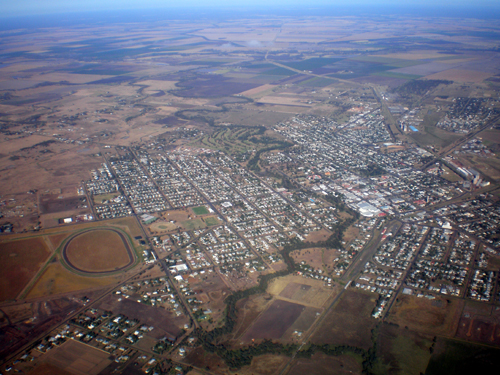
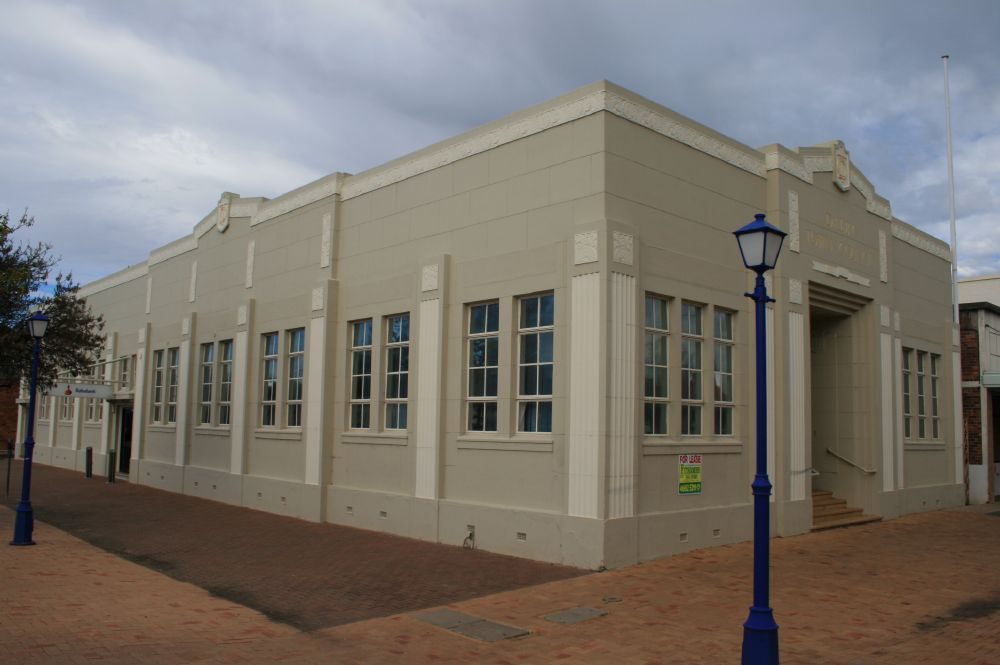
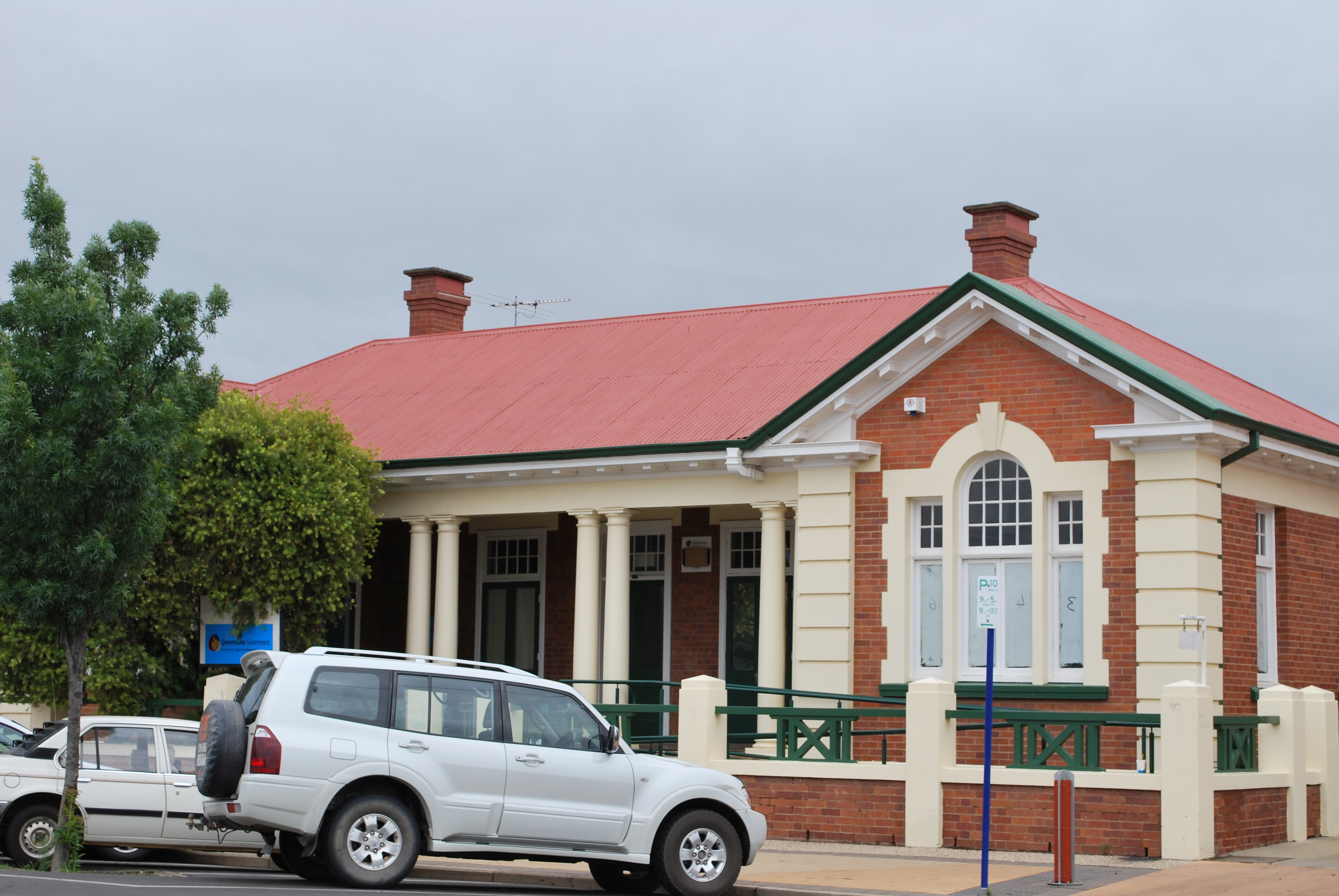
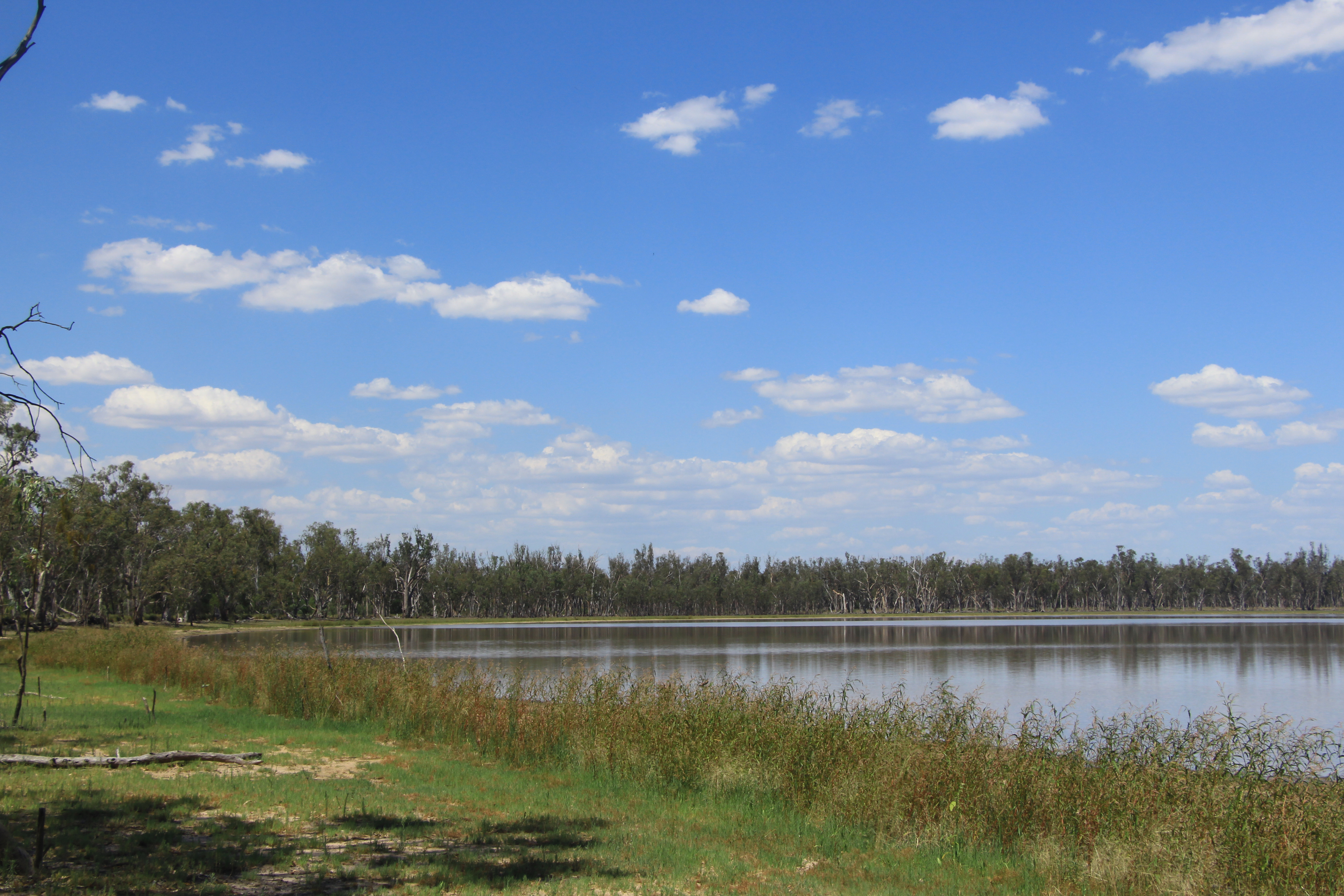
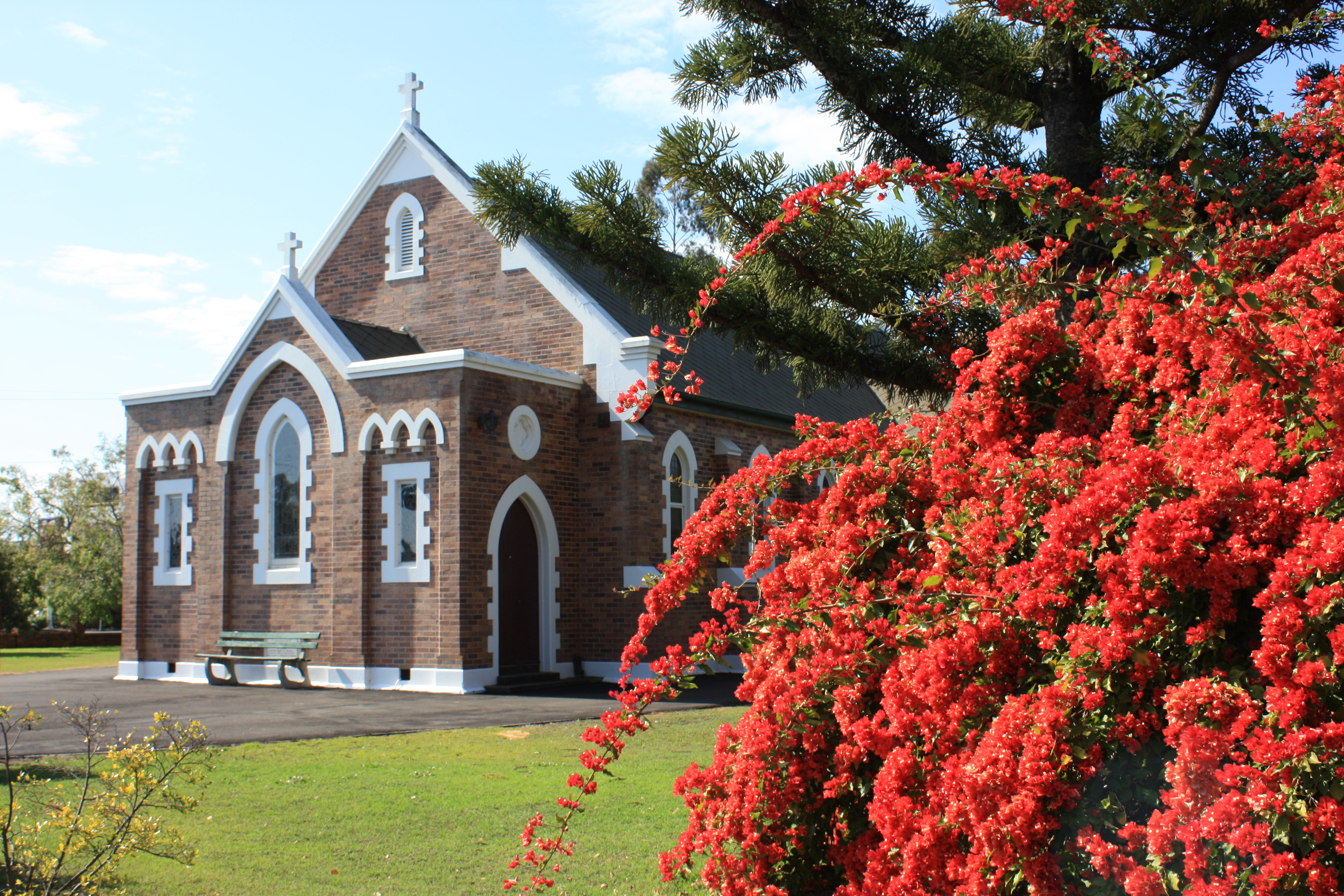
- (From left to right); Aerial view of Dalby, Dalby Council Chambers, Dalby Court House, Lake Broadwater, St John's Anglican Church

- Interactive map of Dalby
- Coordinates: 27.1813°S 151.2661°E
- Country: Australia
- State: Queensland
- LGA: Western Downs Region
- Location: 83.5 km (51.9 mi) NW of Toowoomba; 211 km (131 mi) WNW of Brisbane; 57 km (35 mi) WNW of Oakey; 269 km (167 mi) ESE of Roma; 535 km (332 mi) ESE of Charleville

Government
  - State electorate: Warrego
  - Federal division: Maranoa

Area
  - Total: 323.8 km^{2} (125.0 sq mi)
- Elevation: 344 m (1,129 ft)

Population
  - Total: 12,758 (2021 census)
  - Density: 39.401/km^{2} (102.048/sq mi)
- Time zone: UTC+10:00 (AEST)
- Postcode: 4405
- Mean max temp: 26.3 °C (79.3 °F)
- Mean min temp: 11.9 °C (53.4 °F)
- Annual rainfall: 682.5 mm (26.87 in)
Localities around Dalby
| Macalister | Pirrinuan | Kaimkillenbun |
| Ranges Bridge | Dalby | Irvingdale; Blaxland |
| Nandi | St Ruth | Bowenville |

Dalby (/ˈdɒlbi/) is a rural town and locality in the Western Downs Region, Queensland, Australia. In the 2021 census, the locality of Dalby had a population of 12,758 people.

It is on the Darling Downs and is the administrative centre for the Western Downs Region.

== Geography ==
Dalby is approximately 82.3 kilometres (51.1 miles) west of Toowoomba, 208 kilometres (129 mi) west northwest of the state capital, Brisbane, 269 kilometres (167 miles) east southeast of Roma and 535 kilometres (332 miles) east southeast of Charleville at the junction of the Warrego, Moonie and Bunya Highways. State Route 82 also passes through Dalby. It enters from the north as Dalby–Jandowae Road and exits to the south as Dalby–Cecil Plains Road. Dalby–Cooyar Road exits to the east.

Dalby is the centre of Australia's richest grain and cotton growing area.

Mocattas Corner is a neighbourhood on the eastern boundary of the locality with Irvingdale (27.1166°S 151.3666°E). It takes its name from the former Mocattas Corner railway station (27.1159°S 151.3629°E), which in turn was named after George Gershon Mocatta, a pastoralist who took up the Cumkillenbar pastoral run in August 1849.

== Transport ==
=== Western railway line ===
The Western railway line passes through Dalby with a number of railway stations serving the locality:

- Baining railway station (27.1103°S 151.1681°E)
- Yarrala railway station, now closed (27.1244°S 151.1887°E)
- Tycanba railway station (27.1659°S 151.2491°E)
- Dalby railway station in Hunter Street (27.1799°S 151.2715°E) serving the town
- Blaxland railway station (27.1963°S 151.3195°E)

=== Glenmorgan railway line ===
The Glenmorgan railway line branches from the Western railway line just west of the Dalby railway station with the following railway stations within the locality of Dalby":

- Yumborra railway station, now closed (27.1826°S 151.2387°E)
- Dalby West railway station (27.1812°S 151.2456°E)
- Natcha railway station, serving the Dalby Butter Factory, now closed (27.1783°S 151.2536°E)

=== Bell Branch railway line ===
The now-closed Bell Branch railway line also branched from the Western railway line with the following railway stations within the locality of Dalby:

- Bonyumba railway station (27.1689°S 151.2793°E)
- Sanatorium railway station, serving the Dalby Sanatorium (27.1556°S 151.2930°E)
- Mocattas Corner railway station (27.1159°S 151.3629°E)

=== Airports ===
Dalby Aerodrome is an airport (27.1607°S 151.2642°E).

There is a heliport at Dalby Hospital (27.1671°S 151.2769°E).

== History ==
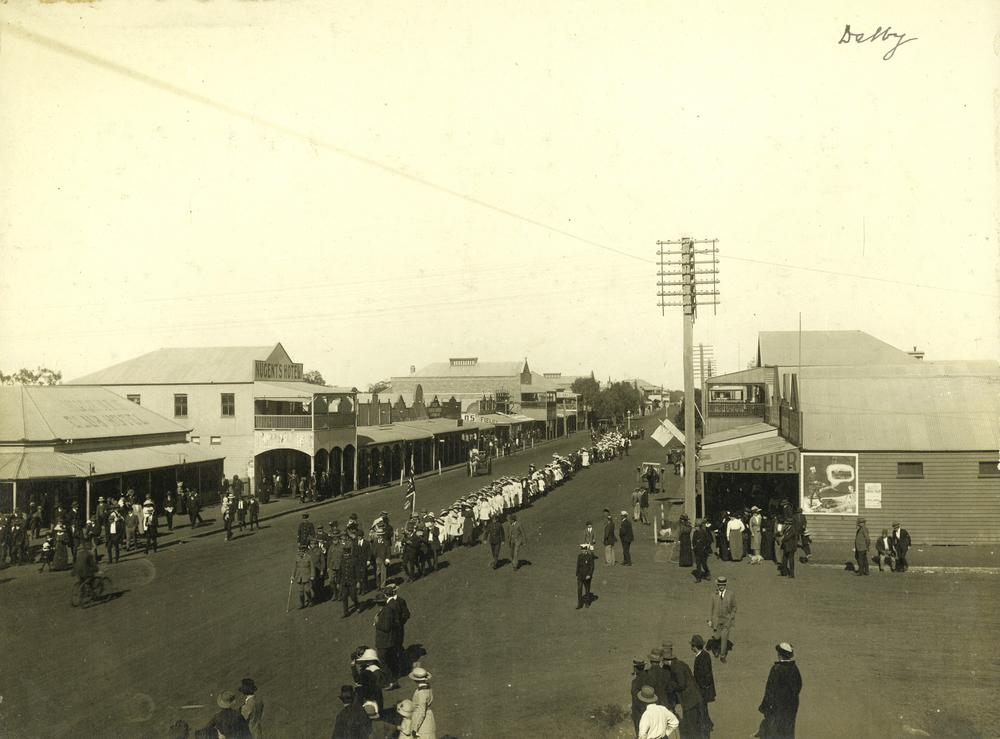
Children marching in the main street, ca. 1915

Baranggum (also known as Barrunggam, Barunggam Parrungoom and Murrumgama) is an Australian Aboriginal language spoken by the Baranggum people. The Baranggum language region includes the landscape within the local government boundaries of the Western Downs Regional Council, particularly Dalby, Tara, Jandowae and west towards Chinchilla.

Dalby was founded in the early 1840s at a place known locally as "The Crossing" on Myall Creek, a tributary of the Condamine River. The first settler was Henry Dennis, who explored the region and chose land for himself and others in the locality. Today an obelisk in Edward Street denotes the location where Dennis camped.

A small settlement was founded to assist travellers heading north to nearby Jimbour Station. The explorer Ludwig Leichhardt visited the area in 1844, on his way to Port Essington.

In February 1853, the New South Wales government sent the Deputy Surveyor General Captain Samuel Perry to the area to survey a township. In August of the following year, Charles Douglas Eastaughffe arrived with a document under the Seal of the NSW Government officially proclaiming 'Dalby' a township. Eastaughffe was later appointed Chief Constable and remained in Dalby until his retirement.

The name of the town is believed to come from the village of Dalby on the Isle of Man and reflects immigration from the Isle of Man in the mid-19th century. The name was apparently chosen by Captain Samuel Perry when he surveyed the settlement in 1853.

Myall Creek Post Office also opened in 1854 in Roche's store, with Mr. Simpson as the first postmaster. It was renamed Dalby in 1855.

In 1859, Dalby became part of the new Colony of Queensland.

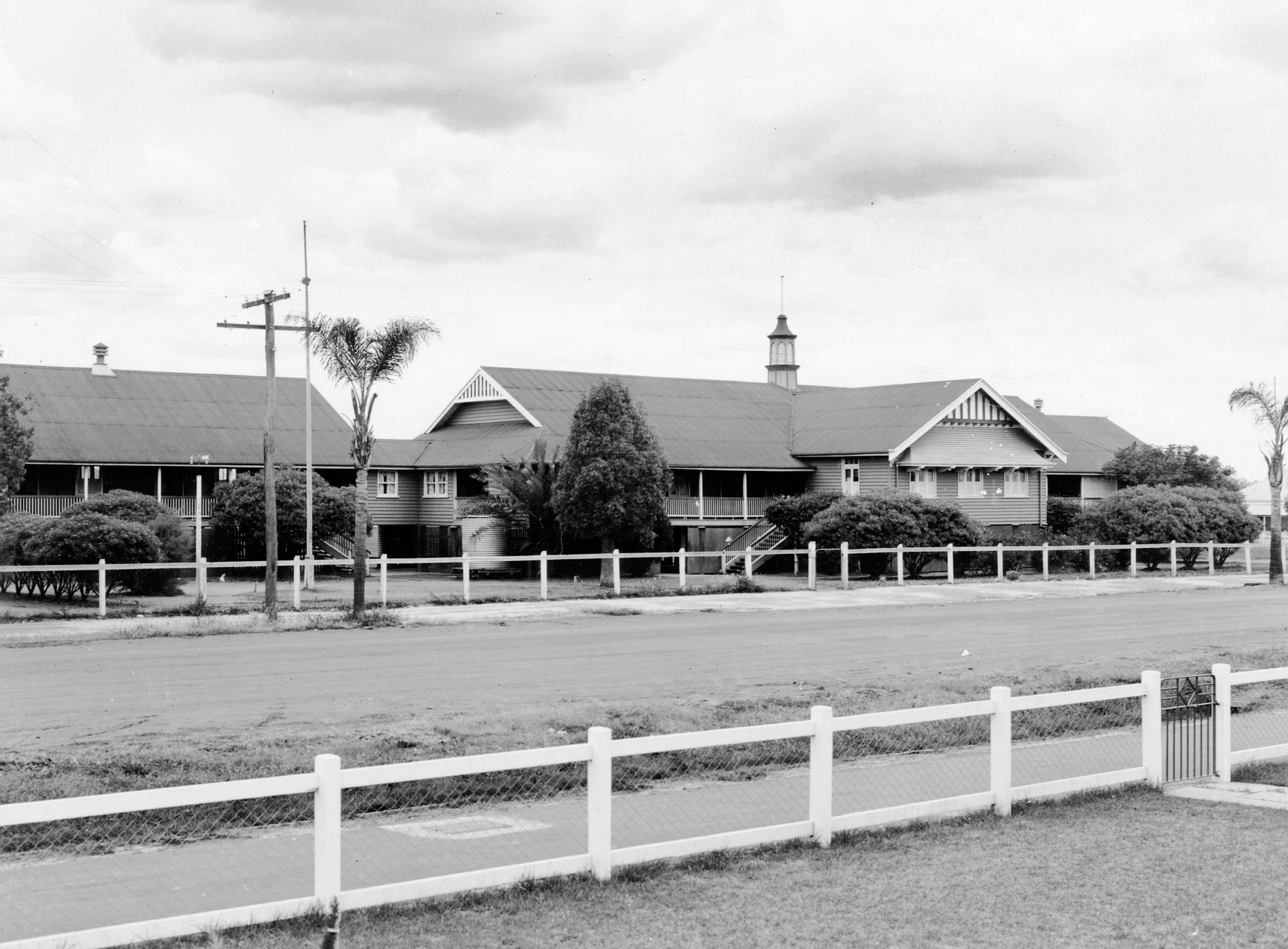
Dalby State School, circa 1954

Dalby State School opened on 1 June 1861. In 1869, the school split into Dalby Boys State School Dalby Girls State School. In 1885, the girls' school became Dalby Girls & Infants State School. In 1893, the two schools were combined as Dalby State School. In 1914, the school expanded to include a secondary school, which closed in 1954, due to the establishment of a separate secondary school, Dalby State High School.

In August 1863, Dalby was officially proclaimed a municipality, the Borough of Dalby, in the Queensland Government Gazette.

Dalby Non-Vested School opened as a Roman Catholic girls school in 1864 and in 1866 became a non-vested school (the teachers' salaries were paid by the Queensland Government but the government did not operate the school). Circa 1880, the school either closed or continued without government funding.

On Sunday 5 August 1866, Bishop James Quinn dedicated St Joseph's Catholic Church.

Dalby was linked by the Western railway line to Ipswich on 16 April 1868.

On Sunday 20 June 1869, the first Presbyterian church was opened in Dalby. Reverend George Grimm had conducting regular services since 1865.

St Columba's School was a Catholic primary school which was opened in 1877 by the Sisters of Mercy. In 2008, it merged with St Mary's College to create Our Lady of the Southern Cross College.

From 1873 to 1949, the electoral district of Dalby was an electoral district of the Legislative Assembly of Queensland.

Mocatta's Corner Provisional School opened circa 1887. On 1 January 1909, it became Mocatta's Corner State School. It closed in 1925. It was on the south-west corner of the junction of Dalby Cooyar Road and Mocattas Corner Road (27.11677°S 151.36232°E).

Dalby was believed to have a healthy climate and in October 1900 the Queensland Government opened the Jubilee Sanitorium for consumptive patients. The name Jubilee commemorates the Diamond Jubilee of Queen Victoria. In 1904 the Dalby Town Council erected therapeutic thermal baths using artesian water from a local bore for those wishing to improve their health by "taking the waters". In 1938, the council closed the artesian baths as interest in "taking the waters" was declining. Medical opinion became increasingly doubtful of the benefits of bathing in mineral waters, favouring drugs and physiotherapy as better treatments. It closed in January 1938 with its remaining patients transferred to Westwood Sanatorium.

Kincora Provisional School opened in 1908 "via Dalby" and was renamed Moonie River Provisional School circa December 1908. It closed circa 1916.

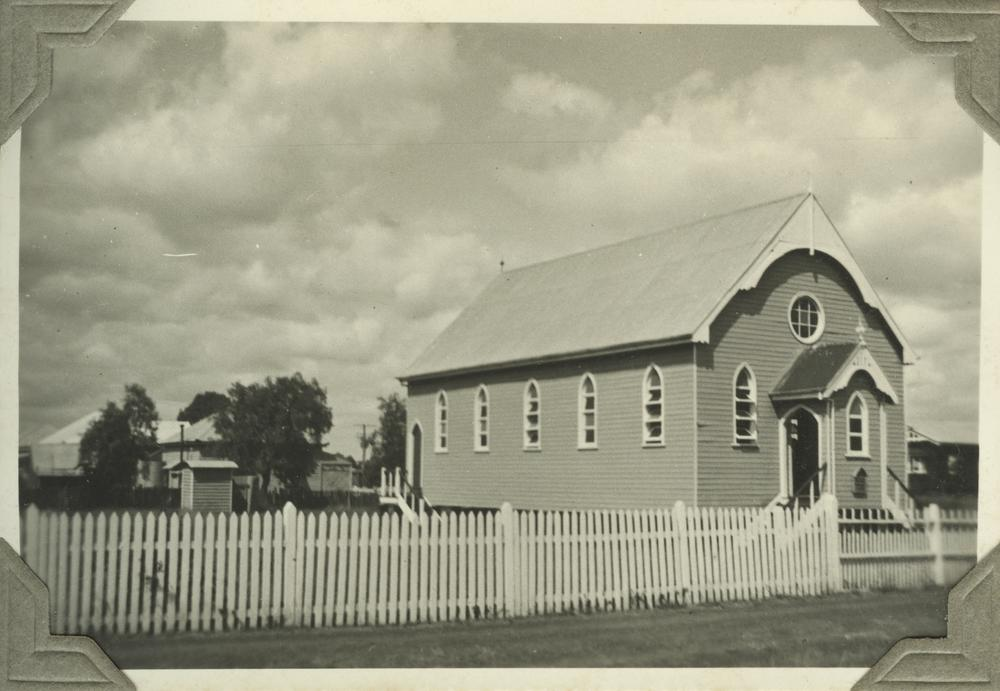
Dalby Methodist Church, circa 1935

On 8 December 1912, the Dalby Methodist Church in Condamine Street was officially opened by the Reverend Henry Youngman, the President of the Queensland Methodist Conference. In March 1949 it was announced that a new church would be built with the original church to be moved on the site and be used as a church hall. On 1 October 1949 the foundation stone for the new Dalby Methodist Church was laid by Reverend Henry William Prouse, the President of the Queensland Methodist Conference. Construction commenced in May 1950, but there were delays in obtaining building materials until August 1951. The new church was dedicated on Saturday 8 December 1951 by Reverend Tom Hardy Blackburn. When the Methodist Church amalgamated into the Uniting Church in Australia in 1977, it became the Dalby Uniting Church.

The Dalby War Memorial was unveiled by the Queensland Governor, Matthew Nathan, on 26 July 1922.

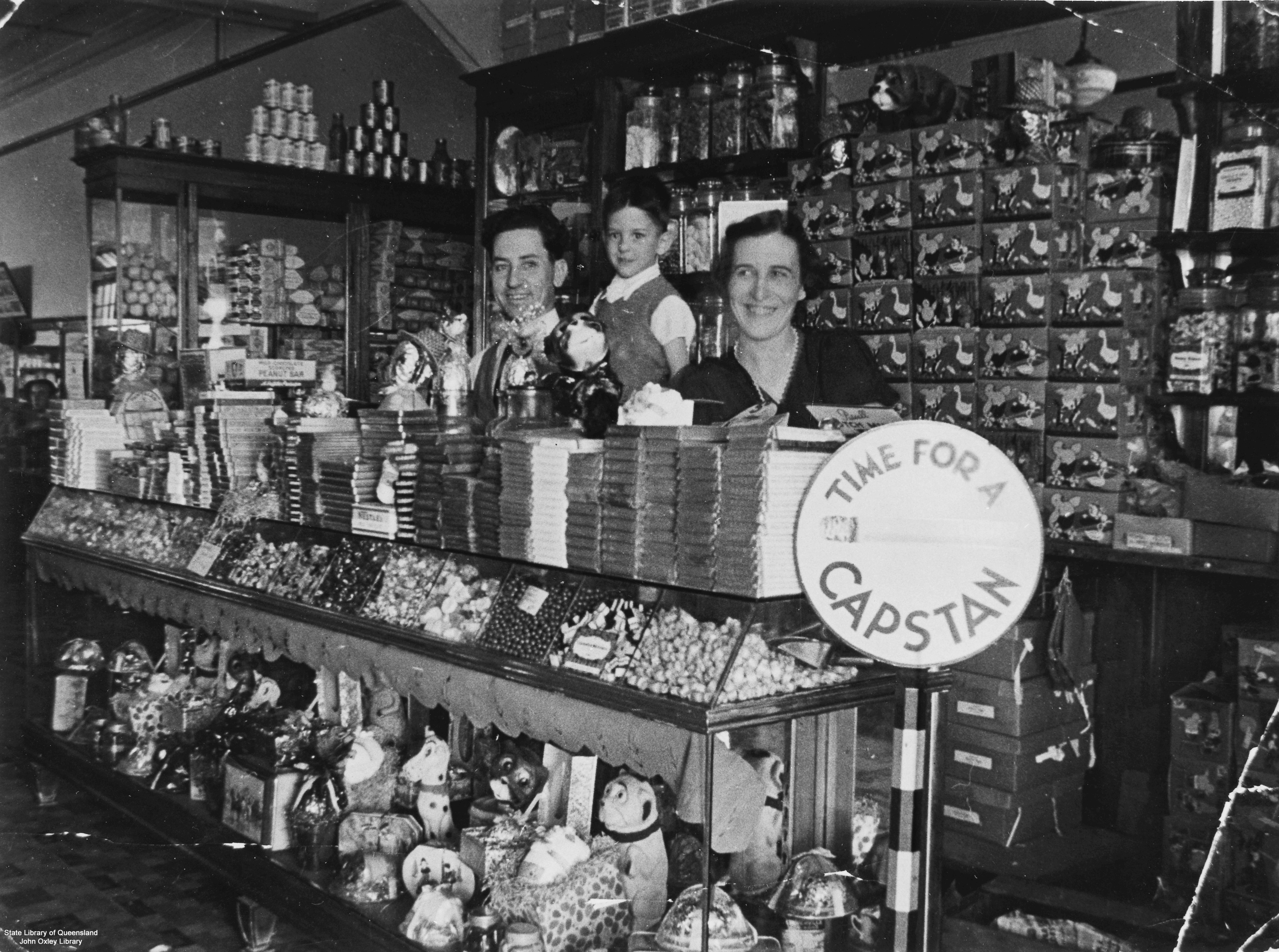
Inside the Paragon Cafe at Dalby, Queensland, ca. 1936

The Paragon Cafe was purchased in 1935 by Milton (Miltiadis) Dimitrios Samios part of the cultural phenomenon of Greek cafes in Queensland. Paragon Cafe employed three men and six women with taking increasing from 90 pounds to 200 pounds within the first year of trading.

The Dalby Olympic Swimming Pool complex was constructed in 1936 and is the earliest identified Olympic standard pool in Queensland constructed outside Brisbane.

Dalby State High School opened on 2 February 1954. Bunya Campus was acquired by Dalby State High School at the start of 2011 and has since provided students who live out of the catchment area the opportunity to attend Dalby State High School and participate in all it has to offer as a boarding student.

St Mary's College was a Catholic secondary school opened on 21 January 1963 by the Christian Brothers. In 2008, it merged with St Columba's School to create Our Lady of the Southern Cross College.

Dalby South State School opened on 29 March 1965.

Dalby Christian School was opened on 1 February 1981 by the Dalby Gospel Chapel.

The Christian Outreach College opened on 28 January 1984. It closed on 18 September 1991.

In 2004, Dalby began treating its water with state-of-the-art reverse osmosis process. The first Reverse Osmosis plant, opened in 2004, was the first in Queensland. The second and larger plant opened in 2011.

In 2006, the opening of Dalby Shoppingworld at the northern end of Cunningham Street has brought new life to the Dalby CBD. The centre includes Woolworths, Big W, Amcal and other specialty shops. As part of nationwide restructuring, Target Country closed its store in January 2021 and was replaced by K Hub, which opened in February.

Dalby Library opened in 2014.

In 2016, Dalby's population was increasing rapidly with many new estates created and subdivisions made. Some notable new estates include Sunnyside Estate, Heritage Gardens, Callistemon Park and a new estate on the Warrego Highway side of Sandalwood Avenue.

== Demographics ==
In the 2016 census, the locality of Dalby had a population of 12,719 people. Aboriginal and Torres Strait Islander people made up 7.0% of the population. 84.0% of people were born in Australia. The next most common countries of birth were Philippines 1.9%, New Zealand 1.3%, England 1.1% and South Africa 0.8%. 88.7% of people spoke only English at home. Other languages spoken at home included Tagalog at 1.0%. The most common responses for religion were Catholic 26.3%, Anglican 19.6% and No Religion 16.9%.

In the 2021 census, the locality of Dalby had a population of 12,758 people.

== Heritage listings ==
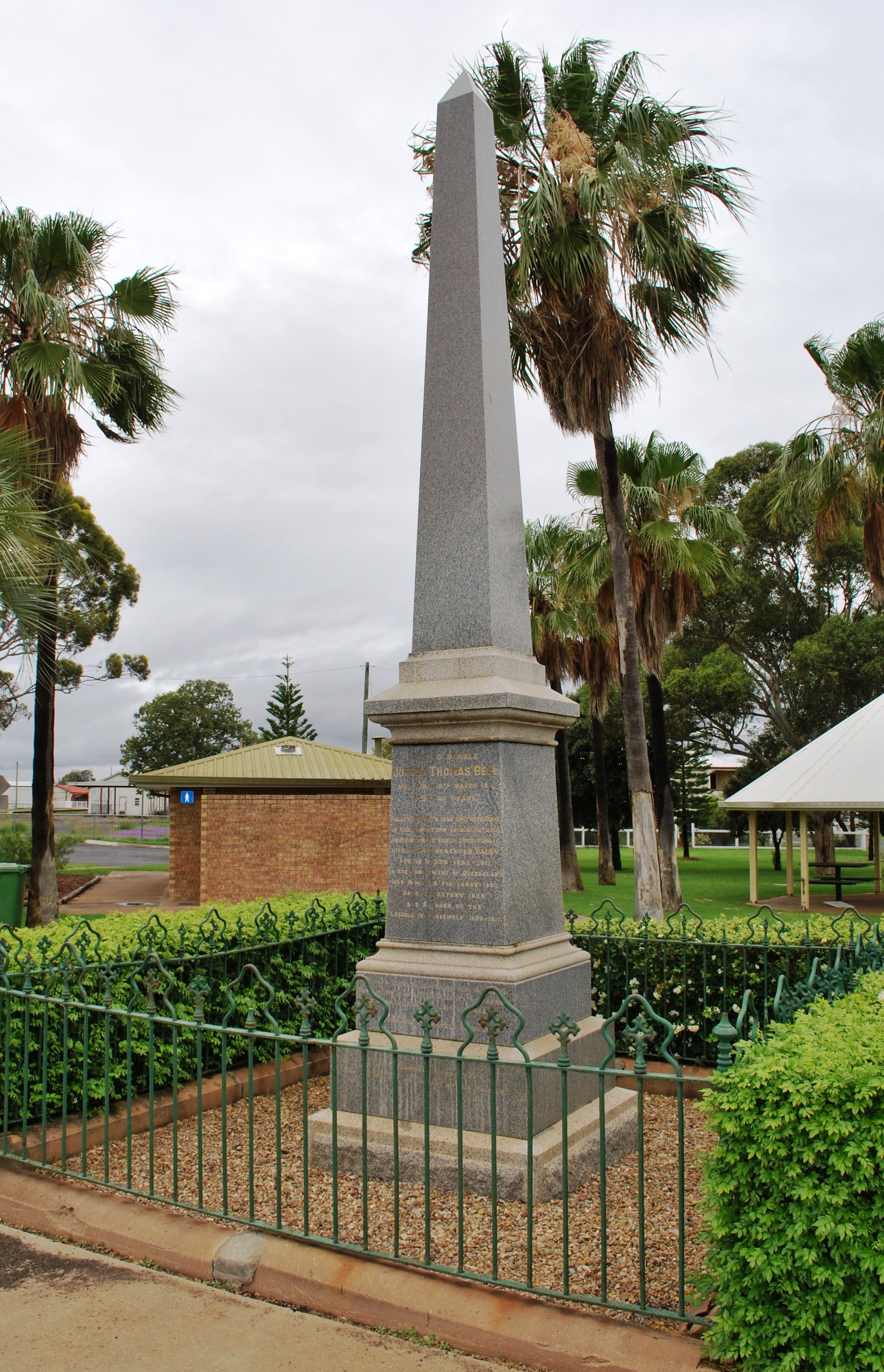
Dalby War Memorial, 2008

Dalby has a number of heritage-listed sites, including:

- 133 Cunningham Street: former Dalby Town Council Chambers and Offices
- 153 Cunningham Street: St John's Anglican Church
- 169 Cunningham Street: St Columba's Convent
- 21 New Street: Dalby Fire Station
- 28B Nicholson Street: Dalby State High School
- Patrick Street: Dalby War Memorial and Gates
- 58 Patrick Street: Dalby Olympic Swimming Pool

== Economy ==
Industry in Dalby includes large-scale engineering, coal mining, and fuels (ethanol). Dalby is the centre of a diverse and productive agricultural area with rich black soil allowing the production of crops such as wheat, cotton and sorghum. Livestock raising including pigs, cattle and sheep is also popular. Two cotton gins are situated within 10 kilometres (6 mi) of the town.

Dalby is to be the site of the first dry mill grain-to-ethanol plant constructed in Australia (the first plant built specifically for the production of ethanol for fuel since World War II).

=== Power ===
The local area is developing an energy-based economy with a large coal-fired power station and a number of coal mines and natural gas bores being established to the west of Dalby. A local company has been awarded a contract to establish wind turbines on adjacent farm land.

Approximately 50 kilometres (31 mi) west of Dalby is the Kogan Creek Power Station. This A$1.2 billion project is a 750-megawatt coal-fired power station, with adjacent coal mine being developed at the small town of Kogan, which is roughly equidistant between Dalby, Chinchilla, and Tara.

== Education ==
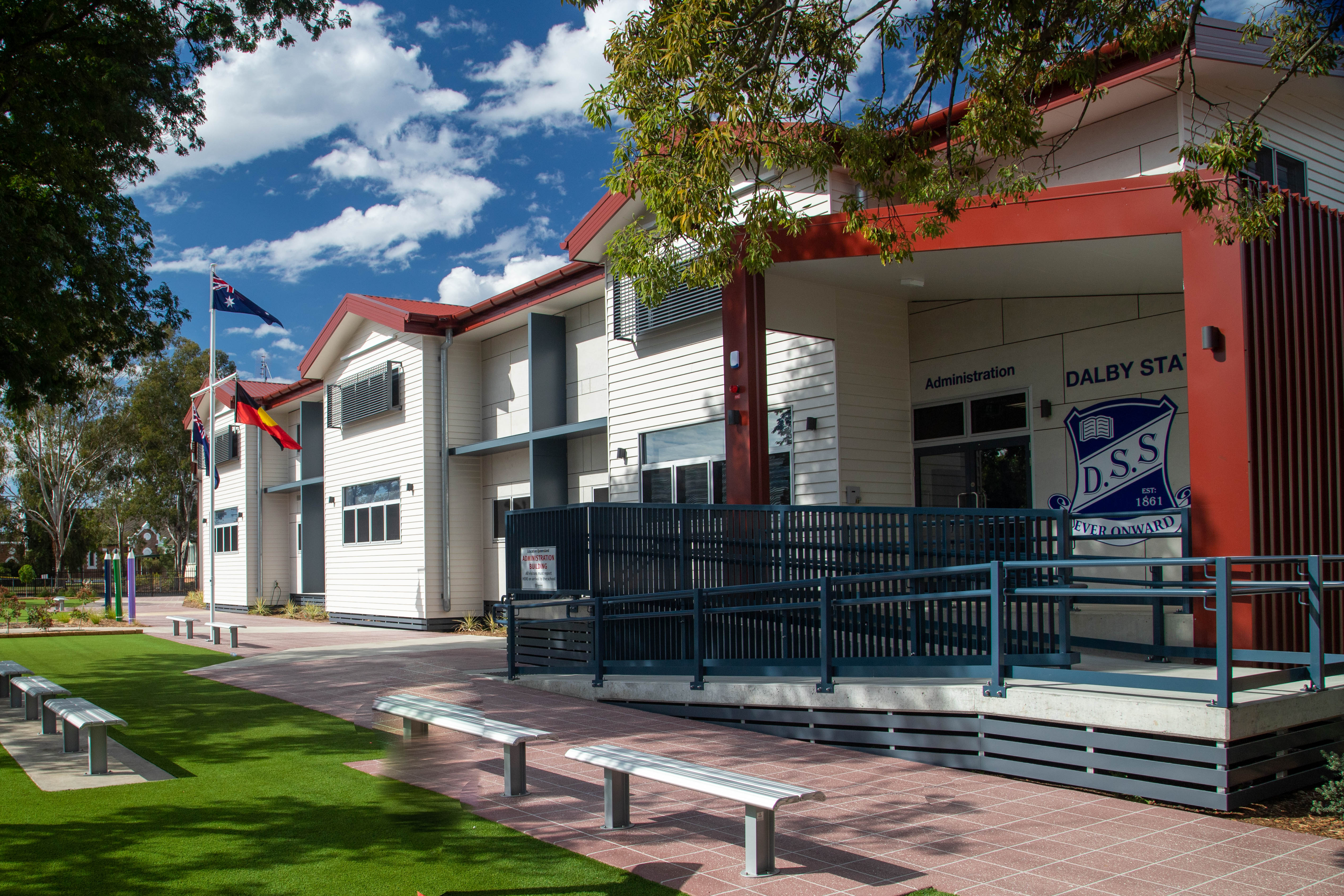
Dalby State School administration building, 2019

Dalby State School is a government primary (Preparatory to Year 6) school for boys and girls at 155 Cunningham Street (27.1846°S 151.2623°E). In 2017, the school had an enrolment of 579 students with 43 teachers (39 full-time equivalent) and 35 non-teaching staff (23 full-time equivalent) and has a special education program. It is one of the oldest state primary schools in Queensland.

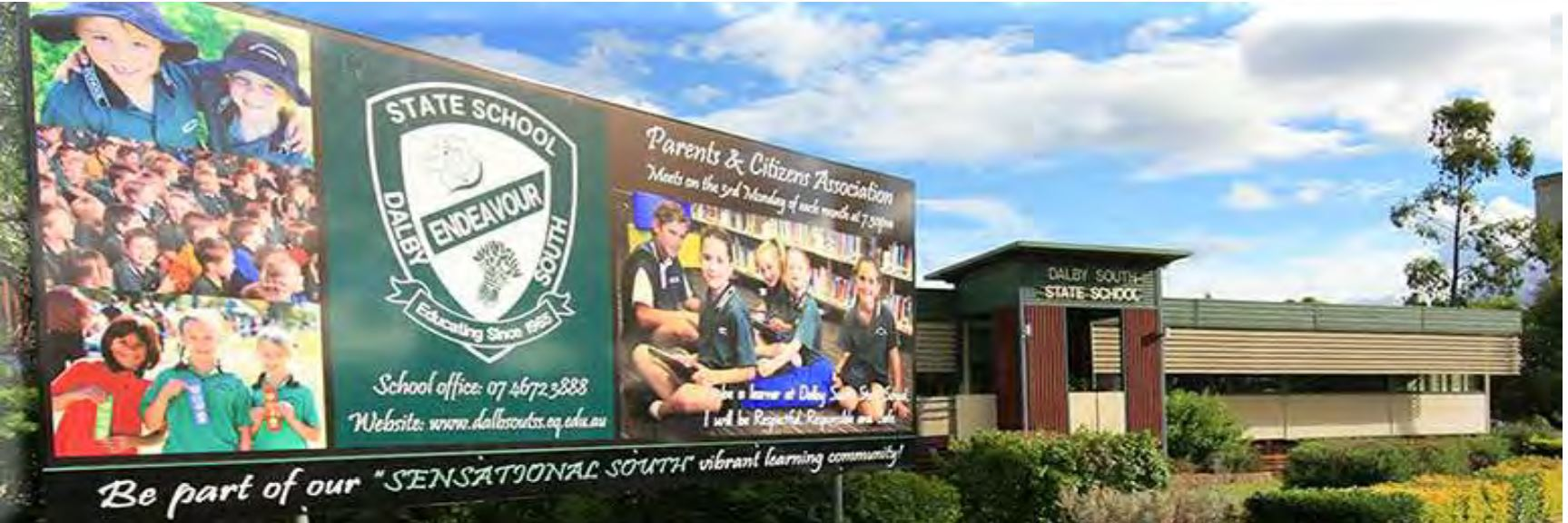
Dalby South State School, 2023

Dalby South State School is a government primary (Early Childhood to Year 6) school for boys and girls at 65 Owen Street (corner of Bunya Street, 27.1948°S 151.2701°E). In 2017, the school had an enrolment of 653 students with 46 teachers (43 full-time equivalent) and 32 non-teaching staff (21 full-time equivalent). It includes a special education program (Preparatory to Year 10).

Our Lady of the Southern Cross College is a Catholic primary and secondary (Preparatory to Year 12) school for boys and girls at 2 Nicholson Street (27.1718°S 151.2676°E). In 2017, the school had an enrolment of 594 students with 48 teachers (44 full-time equivalent) and 31 non-teaching staff (20 full-time equivalent). It has a special education program.

Dalby Christian College is a private primary and secondary (Preparatory to Year 12) school for boys and girls at 2A Mary Street (27.1722°S 151.2780°E). It is operated by the Christian Community Ministries. In 2017, the school had an enrolment of 328 students with 25 teachers (24 full-time equivalent) and 17 non-teaching staff (13 full-time equivalent). It has an early learning centre and boarding for secondary students as well as a special education program.

Dalby State High School is a government secondary (7–12) school for boys and girls at 26 Nicholson Street (27.1781°S 151.2595°E). In 2017, the school had an enrolment of 1,040 students with 94 teachers (89 full-time equivalent) and 71 non-teaching staff (54 full-time equivalent). It includes a special education program. The school has a boarding facility for boys and girls at 463 Bunya highway (27.1523°S 151.2949°E).

Many students from small towns surrounding Dalby (such as Jandowae and Warra) attend Dalby State High School, as these communities do not have schools which provide senior level education.

== Local media ==
The Dalby Herald (once a print newspaper, now online-only) is published in Dalby.

Dalby also has its own community radio station, 89.9 FM 4DDD, which was founded on 26 January 1992.

Several ABC radio stations can be received in Dalby with other ABC radio stations available via audio-only television channels.

== Facilities ==
Water and sewerage treatment services are provided by Western Downs Regional Council. The town has made a ground-breaking deal with nearby gas companies by taking water from gas fields. It has been noted that the town will have a definite water supply for at least another 30 years, taking into account demographic trends.

There is also the Dalby Cemetery, a monumental cemetery.

== Amenities ==
Western Downs Regional Council operates a public library at 107 Drayton Street. It is open 10am to 5:30pm Monday to Friday and 10am to 12:30pm Saturday. Dalby Library has two Creative Studios which have the latest in content creation tools, professional equipment and software, music production and recording, and digital production and editing to help create and share projects.

St Mark's Lutheran Church is at 58A Condamine Street (27.1806°S 151.2632°E).

Dalby Uniting Church is at 71–73 Condamine Street (27.1834°S 151.2604°E).

The Springvale Kupunn branch of the Queensland Country Women's Association meets at 52 Cunningham Street.

== Sport ==
Dalby has a strong rugby League history with a senior rugby league team in the Toowoomba Rugby League known as The Dalby Diehards (founded 1980). The Junior Rugby League Team, The Dalby Devils, that participate in to Toowoomba Junior Rugby League.

Dalby has an Australian rules football team, the Dalby Swans (founded 1980) based at the Dalby AFL oval which fields men's, women's and junior teams in the AFL Darling Downs competition. It has produced top level players like Zimmorlei Farquharson.

== Attractions ==
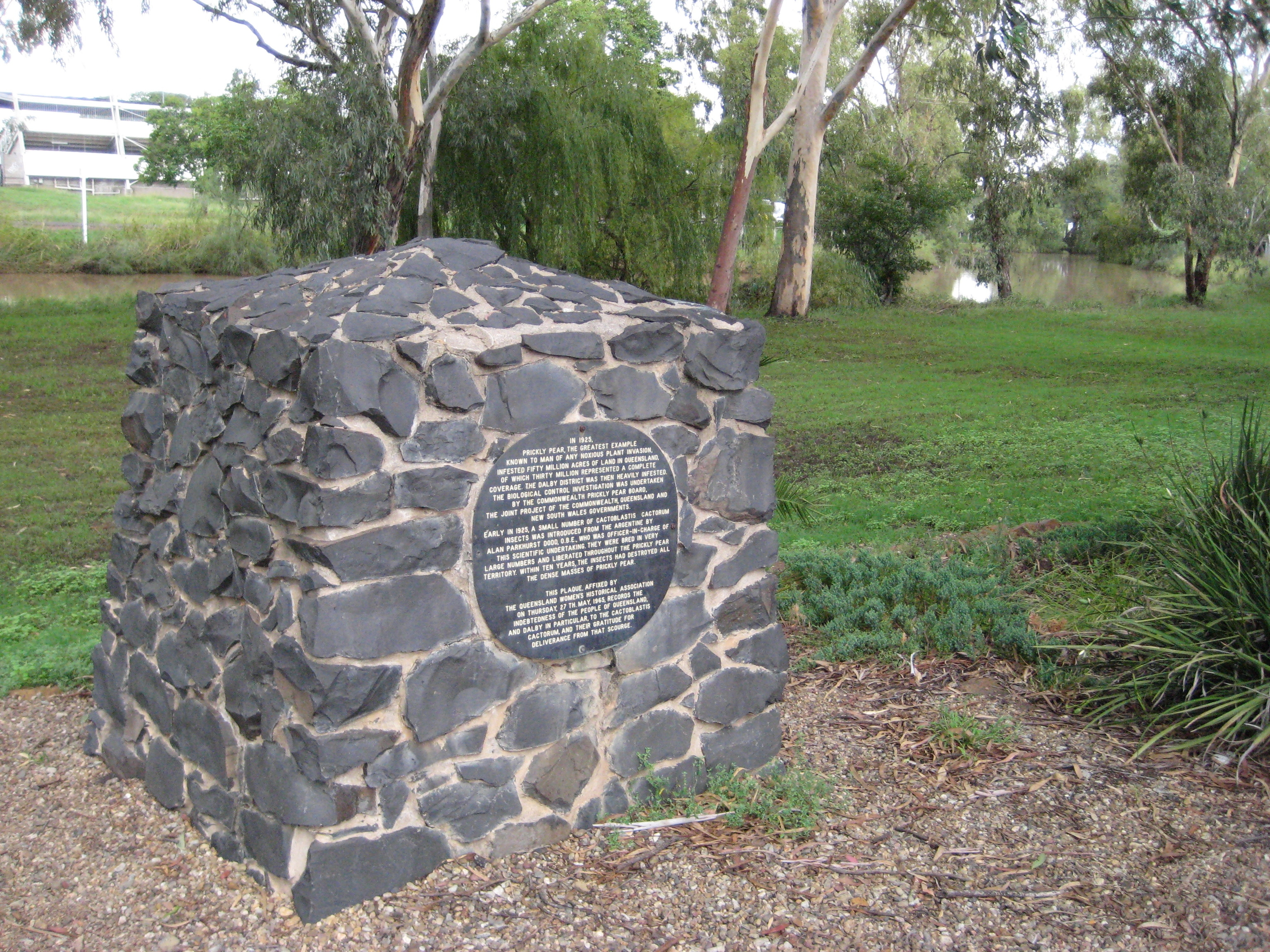
Dalby cactoblastis monument

Dalby has a monument to the Cactoblastis cactorum in a park by the Myall Creek which runs through the town. The Argentinian caterpillar successfully eradicated the prickly pear in the 1920s.

== Climate ==
Dalby has a humid subtropical climate (Cfa in the Köppen climate classification) and being located just to the west of the Great Dividing Range it is hotter and less humid in summer and colder and drier in winter than nearby locations on the other side of the range. Dalby has had a recording weather station since 1893, but that was replaced in 1992 by another station at the Dalby Airport. The town's highest recorded temperature was 45.6 °C (114.1 °F) on 4 December 1913, while the coldest was −7.2 °C (19.0 °F) on 5 July 1895. The annual rainfall is 681.2 mm (26.82 in), the majority of which falls as thunderstorms in the summer months.

Dalby experienced its worst floods since 1981 in late December 2010. The town's water purification system was flooded, resulting in water restrictions that have hampered clean-up efforts. 112,500 litres (24,700 imp gal; 29,700 US gal) of water were transported to the town of 14,000 residents. In early March 2013, Dalby received another severe flood, cutting the town in two after 122 mm (4.8 in) of rain was recorded over a few days. Flood waters peaked at 3.21 metres and a number of homes received water damage.

Climate data for Dalby Airport (1992–2022, 344 m AMSL)
| Month | Jan | Feb | Mar | Apr | May | Jun | Jul | Aug | Sep | Oct | Nov | Dec | Year |
|---|---|---|---|---|---|---|---|---|---|---|---|---|---|
| Record high °C (°F) | 42.6 (108.7) | 43.0 (109.4) | 40.2 (104.4) | 35.2 (95.4) | 32.9 (91.2) | 31.1 (88.0) | 27.4 (81.3) | 34.2 (93.6) | 38.4 (101.1) | 39.5 (103.1) | 41.3 (106.3) | 42.1 (107.8) | 43.0 (109.4) |
| Mean daily maximum °C (°F) | 32.6 (90.7) | 31.6 (88.9) | 30.2 (86.4) | 27.3 (81.1) | 23.3 (73.9) | 20.1 (68.2) | 19.9 (67.8) | 21.9 (71.4) | 25.7 (78.3) | 28.5 (83.3) | 30.6 (87.1) | 31.8 (89.2) | 27.0 (80.5) |
| Mean daily minimum °C (°F) | 18.8 (65.8) | 18.4 (65.1) | 16.6 (61.9) | 12.5 (54.5) | 8.9 (48.0) | 5.5 (41.9) | 4.1 (39.4) | 4.6 (40.3) | 8.7 (47.7) | 12.7 (54.9) | 15.6 (60.1) | 17.7 (63.9) | 12.0 (53.6) |
| Record low °C (°F) | 10.0 (50.0) | 10.6 (51.1) | 5.0 (41.0) | 0.6 (33.1) | −3.6 (25.5) | −4.6 (23.7) | −5.8 (21.6) | −6.2 (20.8) | −2.2 (28.0) | −0.2 (31.6) | 2.5 (36.5) | 7.7 (45.9) | −6.2 (20.8) |
| Average precipitation mm (inches) | 74.3 (2.93) | 80.6 (3.17) | 62.9 (2.48) | 17.7 (0.70) | 35.4 (1.39) | 31.4 (1.24) | 22.8 (0.90) | 22.0 (0.87) | 27.0 (1.06) | 62.2 (2.45) | 69.6 (2.74) | 92.1 (3.63) | 598 (23.56) |
| Average precipitation days (≥ 1.0 mm) | 5.5 | 5.5 | 4.4 | 2.3 | 4.0 | 3.4 | 3.2 | 2.7 | 3.6 | 5.9 | 6.1 | 7.2 | 53.8 |
Source: Australian Bureau of Meteorology Dalby Airport (1992–2022)

== Notable residents ==
- Luke and Cody Cook, Winners of House Rules (2016)
- Brodie Croft, rugby league player
- B. R. Dionysius, poet
- Beau Fermor, rugby league player
- Zimmorlei Farquharson, Australian rules footballer
- Jayson Gillham, classical pianist
- David Gleeson, golfer
- Stirling Hinchliffe, Queensland Labor politician
- Jerry Jerome, stockman and boxer
- Alan Jones, radio host and rugby coach
- Sir James Killen, Liberal MP for Moreton 1955–1983
- George Lee, gliding champion
- Jason Little, former Australian professional rugby union player
- Andrew McCullough, rugby league player
- Andrew McGahan, author
- Mark O'Shea, of the country music duo O'Shea
- Steve Price, rugby league player
- Margot Robbie, actress
- John Size, Australian Racing Hall of Fame trainer
- Hugh Sweeny, first Australian prisoner of war in World War II
- Carl Webb, NRL, Queensland and Australian Rugby League Player
- Stephen Wilson, Paralympic athlete

== See also ==
- Bunya Mountains
