= Dalby Airport =

Airport in Queensland, Australia

- IATA: DBY; ICAO: YDAY

Summary
- Airport type: Public
- Operator: Western Downs Regional
- Serves: Dalby, Queensland
- Location: Dalby, Queensland
- Coordinates: 27.155°S 151.266944°E
- Interactive map of Dalby Airport

Runways
| Direction | Length | | Surface |
| Direction | m | ft | Surface |
|---|---|---|---|
| 04/22 | 1,303 | 4,275 | Asphalt |
| 31/13 | 1,599 | 5,249 | Asphalt |

Dalby Airport (IATA: DBY, ICAO: YDAY) is a small airport located 1.2 kilometres (0.75 mi) north of the town of Dalby, Queensland Australia. The airport is mostly used for small private light aircraft and agricultural aviation services as well as occasional emergency aircraft including those of the Royal Flying Doctor Service. The airport also sees a daily weekday return mail service operated by GAMAir using Aero Commander 500S aircraft. It also hosts the Dalby Aeroclub, and the Dalby Hang Gliding Club.

There are a number of agricultural aviation businesses and an aircraft maintenance business operating from the airport. Both Avgas and Jet A1 fuel are available.

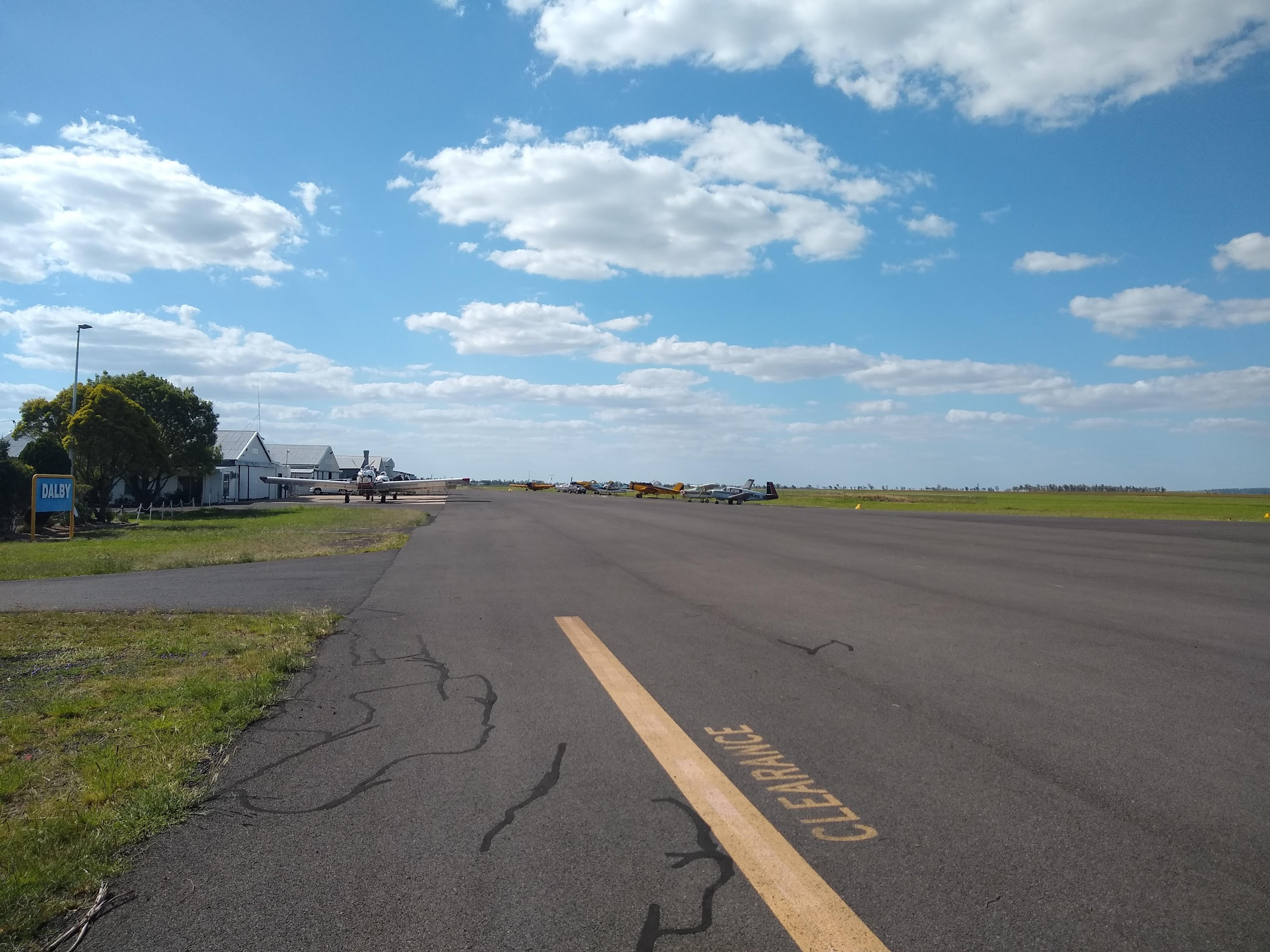
A view of the Dalby Airport apron from the fuel pumps, looking West. Runway 13/31 runs parallel to the apron, while 04/22 is perpendicular and is at the western end of the apron.

Dalby Airport has also hosted the Queensland Easter Soaring Championships and the Dalby Big Air Hang Gliding competition.

== Incidents ==
- On 20 December 2018, an Ayres S-2R-600 Thrush (registration VH-WBW) departing Dalby Airport for crop dusting operations suddenly lost power shortly after takeoff. The pilot dumped the load of fertilizer into an open paddock and made an emergency landing in a field on the Dalby State High School Bunya Campus (formerly Dalby Agricultural College). The aircraft was heavily damaged and subsequently written off, however the pilot sustained only minor injuries and hitch-hiked to hospital after walking to the nearby Bunya Highway. The ATSB is still investigating.
