= Dalby Olympic Swimming Pool =

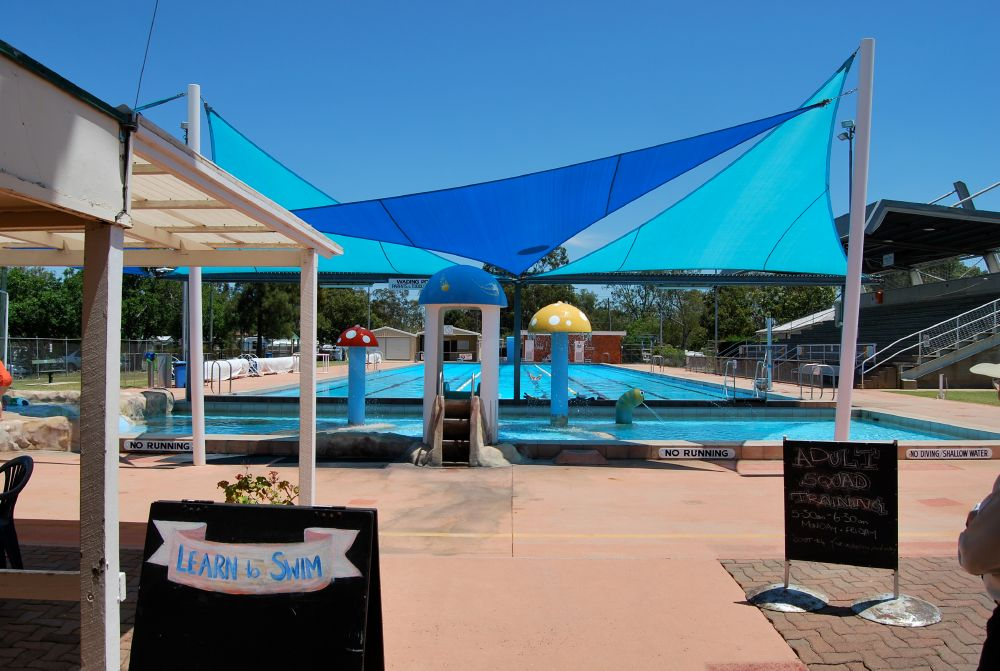
- Dalby Swimming Pool Complex, 2008

- Location within Queensland Location within Australia
- 27.1843°S 151.267°E
- Location: 58 Patrick Street, Dalby, Western Downs Region, Queensland, Australia

History
- Design period: 1919–1930s (interwar period)
- Built: 1936

Site notes
- Architect: Clifford Ernest Plant
- Architectural style: Arts & Crafts

Queensland Heritage Register
- Official name: Dalby Swimming Pool Complex
- Type: state heritage (built)
- Designated: 20 March 2008
- Reference no.: 602564
- Significant period: 1930s
- Significant components: pavilion – sports, residential accommodation – staff housing, swimming/bathing enclosure

Dalby Olympic Swimming Pool is a heritage-listed swimming pool at 58 Patrick Street, Dalby, Western Downs Region, Queensland, Australia. It was designed by Clifford Ernest Plant and built in 1936. It was added to the Queensland Heritage Register on 20 March 2008.

== History ==
The Dalby Olympic Swimming Pool complex was constructed in 1936 and is the earliest identified Olympic standard pool in Queensland constructed outside Brisbane.

Dalby was one of the earliest European settlements on the Darling Downs. The township was surveyed in 1853, the first land sales took place in 1857, and the Town of Dalby was proclaimed a municipality in 1863.

Dalby has a long association with swimming as a sport. Initially, a swimming hole in Myall Creek was used, but in 1902 an artesian bore was sunk on the bank and baths were built nearby to take advantage of the bore water. The Dalby Amateur Swimming Club was formed in 1912. In 1920 a new bore was sunk and in 1924 a public baths (the Dalby Bore Baths) was constructed close to it. This facility closed in September 1938, possibly because the new Olympic Pool had supplanted it.

From the 1910s, swimming as both a competitive and recreational sport gained rapidly in popularity in Queensland, and indeed, world-wide. In 1908 the Federation Internationale de Natation (FINA) was formed with the goals of standardising the rules for swimming, diving and water polo, obtaining control of world records, and ensuring the direction of Olympic Games competitions for swimming, diving and water polo.

Swimming was given further impetus by the 1924 Olympic Games held in Paris. The Piscine des Tourelles, an 8-lane pool measuring 50 metres (160 ft) in length by 20 metres (66 ft) in width, was specially constructed for swimming events, setting the Olympic standards. Swimmers hoping to compete internationally now needed a pool of this size in order to practice effectively. The precise requirements to meet Olympic pool standards have since been refined and cover width, depth, and temperature and light densities.

In Brisbane, the Fortitude Valley Baths were rebuilt in 1925–1926 to the Olympic standard, being 50 metres (160 ft) in length and 22 metres (72 ft) wide. This pool no longer survives.

By the 1930s, swimming was a glamorous sport internationally, with sport and medal winners such as Duke Kahanamoku, Johnny Weissmuller and Buster Crabbe becoming Hollywood celebrities. In Sydney, four Olympic-standard pools were constructed in the 1930s, municipal councils taking advantage of loans and other financial incentives offered by a government keen to create work by encouraging civic building projects. The pool buildings and surrounds of the new Olympic pools were architect designed. A notable survivor is the North Sydney Olympic Pool Complex opened on 4 April 1936.

Design problems with the new large pools included the provision of adequate water filtration and the prevention of algae. The firm of AH Pierce & Co., still associated with commercial pools, imported calcium hypochlorite from England and pool builders took a keen interest in others' pool designs. Pool facilities usually comprised an Olympic-standard pool for recreation and competitions, a smaller pool for children, diving tower, spectators' stand, men's and women's changing rooms and club meeting rooms.

By the early 1930s Dalby was experiencing renewed growth and prosperity, reflecting extensive land reclamation in the surrounding district in the wake of the eradication of the prickly pear cactus. This noxious weed had wasted thousands of hectares of agricultural and grazing land in southern Queensland and northern New South Wales in the late 19th and early 20th centuries. The Annual Report of the Department of Public Lands identified Dalby, Chinchilla and Miles as the towns experiencing the most progress. Under the Intermittent Relief Scheme established during the Depression, the Department of Works remodelled and added to the Dalby State School. The Dalby Court House and Police Station were also built in the first half of the 1930s.

In 1933, Dalby Town Council formed an Olympic pool committee. The idea for a pool and tennis courts in Dalby had been suggested in correspondence to the Council by the Dalby Chamber of Commerce in 1931. The Dalby Town Council appointed William J Reinhold as the consulting engineer and Clifford E Plant as the architect. Plant is noted for the Kings Beach Bathing Pavilion and the Redcliffe Bathing Pavilions Group, designed and constructed in the 1930s.

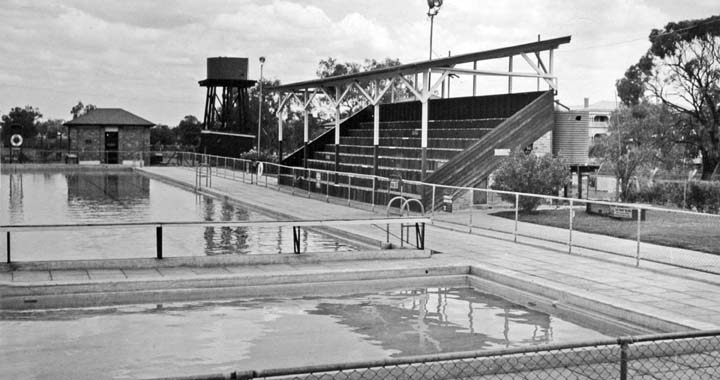
Dalby Olympic Swimming Pool, 1940

Excavation work commenced on 1 July 1936 and the first patrons were admitted late in October of that year, with 1550 people using the pool in the first weekend. The complex was completed at a cost of £11,500 and was officially opened on 14 November 1936 by Frank Cooper, MLA, Minister for Public Instruction, before a crowd of approximately 2,000 people. Commending the Dalby Town Council on its initiative, Cooper commented that there was no town twice or even 10 times the size of Dalby that had a swimming pool like theirs.

At the time, the pool was the most modern in Queensland, using the latest filtration and chlorinating equipment to treat the artesian water used to fill the pools. In March 1938 the Lord Mayor of Brisbane, Alfred James Jones, visited Dalby with the Chairman of the Brisbane Parks and Baths committee in order to inspect it before planning similar pools for Brisbane, though it was some years before such plans were implemented.

The opening of the Dalby pool gave an impetus to regional swimming and a number of swimming clubs were formed including the Dalby and District Swimming and Life-Saving Club, and the association of the pool with community sports clubs continues. The first major swimming carnival was held in February 1937. During the Second World War, aircrew from No. 12 Squadron stationed nearby received their forced landing at sea training in the Dalby pool.

The 1956 Melbourne Olympics led to an increased interest in competition swimming and most surviving early Olympic pools in Australia date from the preparation for, or interest stemming from, these games. Between 1949 and 1960, Dalby district swimmers gained approximately 100 places in Queensland swimming and diving championships. The pool was visited and used by a number of famous Australian swimmers including Dawn Fraser, Murray Rose and members of the Konrad family. During 1957–8 the Dalby pool recorded an annual attendance of 143,167.

The original timber spectator stand for the pool was replaced by a concrete stand in 1971 and named for a former pool manager and coach, Arthur G Obst.

In 1983, the pool area underwent renovation. This work included the replacement of the circulation pipe work, the plant room and water treatment plant, the concrete concourses around the pool and the substitution of skimmer boxes for scum gutters. More recently, the pools have been lined with fibreglass and fibreglass features have been added to the children's pool.

The Dalby Pool Complex remains the venue for large swimming carnivals, one of which, the Dalby Open, attracted 1734 nominations in 2002.

== Description ==
The pool complex is in a parkland setting to the rear of Dalby War Memorial and Gates and adjacent to Myall Creek. It is part of a large recreational precinct which includes a lawn bowls club and croquet club.

The open-air pool complex is approached from Patrick Street by twin paths that divide behind the war memorial, to which the pool pavilion forms a backdrop. A formal arrangement of garden beds and flagpoles fills this space.

The symmetrically placed entry pavilion is a single storey rectangular building spanning the width of the pool complex. It has a hipped roof with gables at each end of the front and a central gabled porch leading to turnstiles and the pool area. This area contains granite panels commemorating the opening of the pool complex. The building is clad with weatherboards on the lower section with panels of fibrous cement sheeting above. It is lit by six pane casement windows. The south-east part of the building contains a service area and kiosk and club meeting rooms are located in the north-west end of the building.

The rear of the building also has a central gabled porch and a timber pergola over a paved area that separates the building from the pool.

Positioned between the entry pavilion and the main pool, and at right-angles to the latter, is a children's pool measuring 15.2 by 8.4 metres (50 by 28 ft). It has recent additions of fibreglass rocks and play features. The main pool measures 50 by 15.2 metres (164 by 50 ft). Concrete concourses and lawns surround the pool and a spectators' stand is positioned along one side, with changing rooms beneath. There is a brick plant room at the far end of the pool.

Also located within the pool complex grounds is a pool caretaker's residence. This is a small, high-set, timber cottage with an enclosed front verandah.

The Arthur G Obst Stand is not the original structure and is not considered significant for heritage purposes.

== Heritage listing ==
Dalby Swimming Pool Complex was listed on the Queensland Heritage Register on 20 March 2008 having satisfied the following criteria.

The place is important in demonstrating the evolution or pattern of Queensland's history.

The Dalby Swimming Pool complex, constructed and opened in 1936, is important in demonstrating the development of competition swimming in Queensland. As an Olympic standard pool built in the 1930s, it illustrates the surge of public interest both in competitive and recreational swimming during the interwar period. As a facility which demonstrated how artesian water might be used to the advantage of a community, the Dalby Swimming Pool also is important in demonstrating the pattern of Queensland's history. It is also important in illustrating the 1930s expansion of civic work in the former prickly pear belt, following the eradication of this pest in the late 1920s and early 1930s. As land cleared of prickly pear cactus was utilised for agriculture, grazing and dairying, towns throughout the prickly pear belt, especially Dalby, Chinchilla and Miles, experienced renewed growth and prosperity.

The place demonstrates rare, uncommon or endangered aspects of Queensland's cultural heritage.

The Dalby Swimming Pool complex is rare as the earliest identified surviving Olympic-sized swimming pool complex in Queensland. It is the earliest known Olympic Pool complex constructed in Queensland outside Brisbane, and retains its two pools (competition and children's), entrance pavilion, and caretaker's residence.

The place has a strong or special association with a particular community or cultural group for social, cultural or spiritual reasons.

The Dalby Swimming Pool Complex has a strong association with the community of Dalby and the surrounding area as an important sports venue for swimming events, enabling Dalby swimmers access to wider Australian competition, and has at times attracted Australian/international swimming stars.
