= Charles Douglas Eastaughffe =

- Born: c. 1804; Inverness, Scotland
- Died: February 13, 1885 (aged 80–81); Nerang, Queensland
- Known for: Early Australian settler; carried official documentation proclaiming the town of Dalby
- Police career
- Department: New South Wales Police
- Service years: c. 1850s – c. 1870s
- Rank: Chief Constable
- Other work: Auctioneer; commission agent; municipal councillor; wool store; theatre owner

Charles Douglas Eastaughffe was an early Australian settler, later becoming a police trooper and Chief Constable of Dalby, Queensland.

== Biography ==
Born in Inverness, Scotland, c. 1804, it is unclear when he first arrived in Australia but it seems to have been about 1835, spending time in Sydney where he married in 1840. There is some evidence that he lived under an alias at this time although the reason is not known. In the early 1850s he moved to northern New South Wales, and served as a police trooper in Wellingrove, near Glen Innes. During this time he was involved in the pursuit of the bushranger Thomas Haywood, requesting the public's help through newspaper appeals to the Morton Bay Courier.

In 1854, Charles Eastaughffe moved to the Darling Downs area and brought with him the official documentation proclaiming the town of Dalby on behalf of Captain Samuel Perry, the Deputy Surveyor-General of New South Wales. He was appointed Chief Constable of Dalby that same year, and a soon after the Governor General also appointed him as the region's slaughter-house inspector.

Mr Eastaughffe held these appointments for a considerable time, and afterwards took to commercial pursuits, engaging in business as Auctioneer and Commission Agent. During Mr Eastaughffe's residence in Dalby he was for several years a member of the Municipal Council, and at various times held positions of trust under the Governments of New South Wales and Queensland. He built a wool receiving store, which he subsequently converted into a theatre, which was well known by the name of Union Hall.

In the mid-1870s, Mr Eastaughffe left Dalby and went to Toowoomba for a couple of years. Charles Eastaughffe retired to Nerang on Queensland's Gold Coast where he died on 13 February 1885.
