= Dalby Herald =

Newspaper in Queensland, Australia

- Type: Online newspaper
- Owner: News Corp Australia
- Founded: 1865
- Headquarters: Dalby, Queensland, Australia
- Website: http://www.dalbyherald.com.au

The Dalby Herald is an online newspaper published in Dalby, Queensland, Australia.

== History ==
The newspaper has been published since 1865.

Along with many other regional Australian newspapers owned by NewsCorp, the newspaper ceased print editions in June 2020 and became an online-only publication from 26 June 2020.

== Digitisation ==
Issues from 1910 to 1954 have been digitised and available through Trove.
