= Dalby War Memorial and Gates =

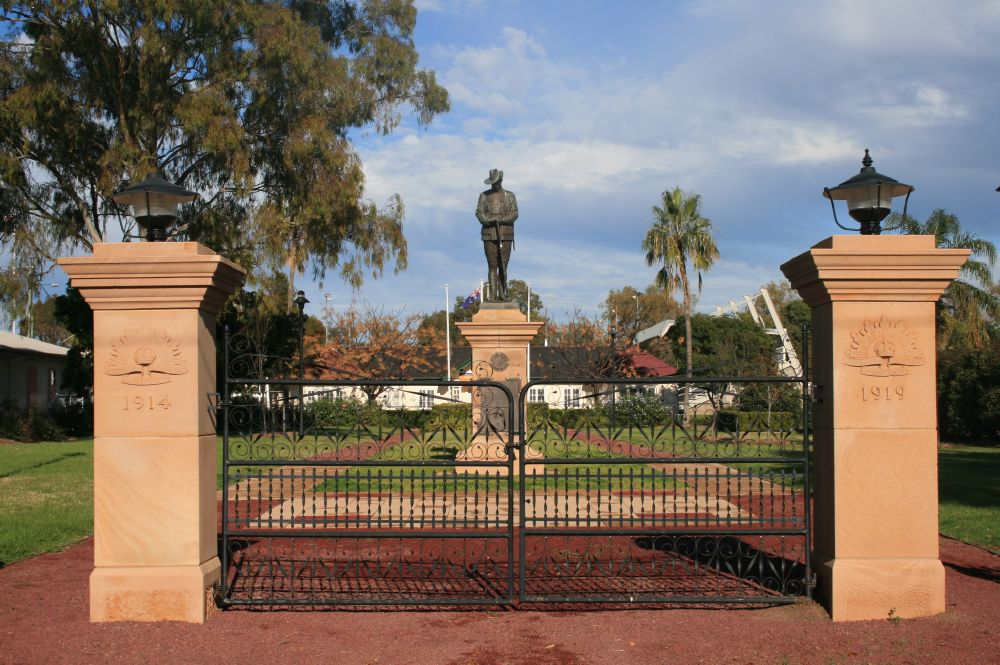
- Dalby War Memorial and Gates, 2008

- Location within Queensland
- 27.1838°S 151.2677°E
- Location: Patrick Street, Dalby, Western Downs Region, Queensland, Australia

History
- Design period: 1919–1930s (interwar period)
- Built: 1922

Site notes
- Architect(s): Harry Shill and British firms

Queensland Heritage Register
- Official name: Dalby War Memorial and Gates
- Type: state heritage (built)
- Designated: 21 October 1992
- Reference no.: 600441
- Significant period: 1922– (social); 1922 (historical, fabric)
- Significant components: memorial – soldier statue, park / green space, pathway/walkway, memorial – gate/s
- Builders: Harry Shill and British firms

Dalby War Memorial and Gates is a heritage-listed memorial at Patrick Street, Dalby, Western Downs Region, Queensland, Australia. It was designed and built in 1922 by Harry Shill and British firms. It was added to the Queensland Heritage Register on 21 October 1992.

== History ==
The Dalby War Memorial was unveiled on 26 July 1922 by the Governor of Queensland, Sir Matthew Nathan. The memorial and gates were designed by local monumental mason, Harry Shill and British firms contributed to the design and construction of the digger statue. The stone and bronze memorial honours the 360 local men who served in the First World War, including the 64 fallen.

Funds for the erection of the memorial were raised by public subscriptions and functions arranged by a public committee.

Dalby is a small town west of Toowoomba. It was surveyed as a township in 1854, and began to prosper with the arrival of the Western railway in 1868. However, this was short-lived as the railway eventually moved further west and the township of Dalby came to depend on its dairy industry and agricultural produce.

In 1919, Dalby requested advice from the Queensland Institute of Architects on the design of its war memorial. The Institute suggested that the town hold a design competition, which it would supervise. It is unclear what occurred next; however there is no evidence to suggest that a competition was held.

Australia, and Queensland in particular, had few civic monuments before the First World War. The memorials erected in its wake became our first national monuments, recording the devastating impact of the war on a young nation. Australia lost 60,000 from a population of about 4 million, representing one in five of those who served. No previous or subsequent war has made such an impact on the nation.

Even before the end of the war, memorials became a spontaneous and highly visible expression of national grief. To those who erected them, they were as sacred as grave sites, substitute graves for the Australians whose bodies lay in battlefield cemeteries in Europe and the Middle East. British policy decreed that the Empire war dead were to be buried where they fell. The word "cenotaph", commonly applied to war memorials at the time, literally means "empty tomb".

Australian war memorials are distinctive in that they commemorate not only the dead. Australians were proud that their first great national army, unlike other belligerent armies, was composed entirely of volunteers, men worthy of honour whether or not they paid the supreme sacrifice. Many memorials honour all who served from a locality, not just the dead, providing valuable evidence of community involvement in the war. Such evidence is not readily obtainable from military records, or from state or national listings, where names are categorised alphabetically or by military unit.

Australian war memorials are also valuable evidence of imperial and national loyalties, at the time, not seen as conflicting; the skills of local stonemasons, metalworkers and architects; and of popular taste. In Queensland, the digger (soldier) statue was the popular choice of memorial, whereas the obelisk predominated in the southern states, possibly a reflection of Queensland's larger working-class population and a lesser involvement of architects.

Many of the First World War monuments have been updated to record local involvement in later conflicts, and some have fallen victim to unsympathetic re-location and repair.

Although there are many different types of memorials in Queensland, the digger statue is the most common. It was the most popular choice of communities responsible for erecting the memorials, embodying the ANZAC spirit and representing the qualities of the ideal Australian: loyalty, courage, youth, innocence and masculinity. The digger was a phenomenon peculiar to Queensland, perhaps due to the fact that other states had followed Britain's lead and established Advisory Boards made up of architects and artists, prior to the erection of war memorials. The digger statue was not highly regarded by artists and architects who were involved in the design of relatively few Queensland memorials

Most statues were constructed by local masonry firms, although some were by artists or imported.

The Dalby digger is based on a Sergeant-Major of the Grenadier Guards and was modelled by British sculptors, John Whitehead and Sons of London. It is one of only two known examples of their work in Queensland, as well as being one of only two bronze diggers in the state. To ensure accuracy of dress, the modelling was supervised by an officer from Australian Army Headquarters and Australia House lent certain accoutrements for copying.

The statue was cast at the foundry of A B Burton in London, whilst the stonework, including the pedestal and gate pillars, was produced by Harry Shill of Dalby.

The bronze plates bearing the names of the soldiers were created by Ernest Gunderson who established his company in Brisbane after migrating from Norway. The company operated until the mid-1930s and supplied honour boards statewide. His work was distinctly original, often incorporating both Australian and British motifs.

Memorials were often enclosed by a fence, indicating a special commemorative area. Occasionally this was further surrounded by a park or other space for the gathering of people on ANZAC Day. The Dalby War Memorial and gates are located in Anzac Park which was gazetted in 1906. The memorial, gates and the setting are considered as a complete entity in which each elements complemented the other.

== Description ==
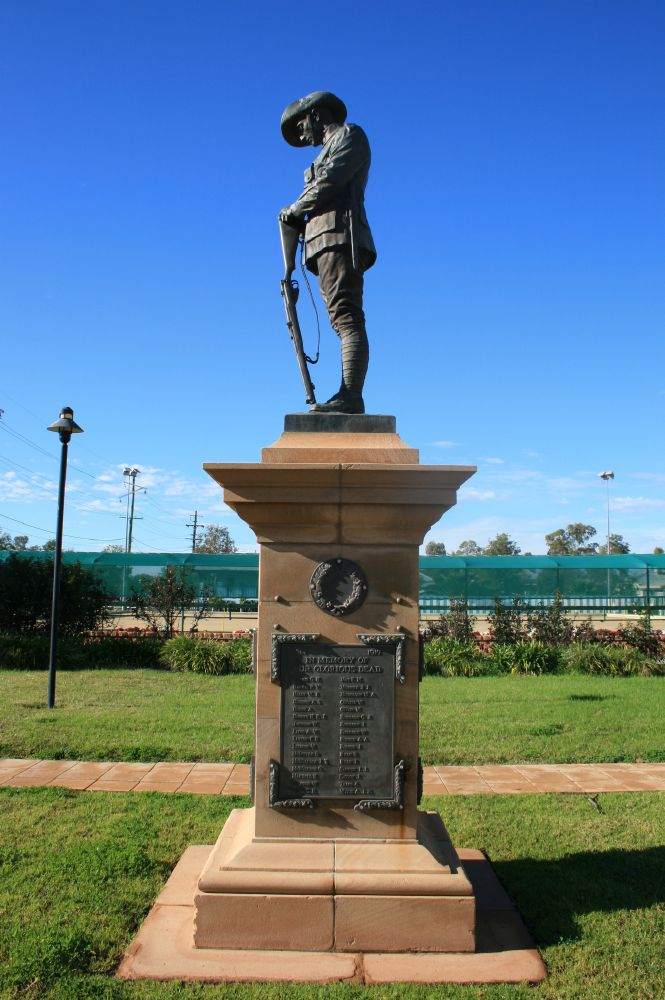
Side view of monument, 2008

The First World War Memorial is situated in a park in Dalby facing Patrick Street. The park is entered from Patrick Street through a set of memorial gates flanked by sandstone pillars surmounted by torch shaped lights. The pillars sit on slightly larger base steps with picked stone faces and smooth-faced margins to the sides and top. They are of similar design to the pedestal of the memorial and capped by the same wide cornice. At the top of the front face of each pillar is a relief carved AIF badge with the date 1914 carved below the emblem on the right, and 1919 on the left. The swing gates are of wrought iron.

The memorial is centred within a wide path which leads from the gates and divides at the rear of the monument.

The sandstone memorial comprises a pedestal surmounted by a digger statue.

It sits on a smooth faced step capped by two cyma recta mouldings of decreasing scale. Rising from this is the pedestal dado which has bronze plaques with brass lettering on each of the four faces. Bronze wreaths are located above each plaque which bear the names of the 360 local men who took part in the First World War including the names of the 64 fallen. The dado is crowned by a large cornice comprising a number of cyma recta mouldings and steps.

Surmounting the pedestal is a larger than life-sized bronze digger statue. The statue portrays an Australian Infantry soldier standing with head bowed and arms reversed.

== Heritage listing ==
Dalby War Memorial and Gates was listed on the Queensland Heritage Register on 21 October 1992 having satisfied the following criteria.

The place is important in demonstrating the evolution or pattern of Queensland's history.

War Memorials are important in demonstrating the pattern of Queensland's history as they are representative of a recurrent theme that involved most communities throughout the state. They provide evidence of an era of widespread Australian patriotism and nationalism, particularly during and following the First World War.

The place demonstrates rare, uncommon or endangered aspects of Queensland's cultural heritage.

This particular digger statue is rare as one of only two in Queensland which are cast in bronze and one of only two known works by London sculptors John Whitehead and Sons in Queensland. It is also an uncommon example of a memorial still situated in its intact setting.

The place is important in demonstrating the principal characteristics of a particular class of cultural places.

The monuments manifest a unique documentary record and are demonstrative of popular taste in the inter-war period.

The memorial at Dalby demonstrates the principal characteristics of a commemorative structure erected as an enduring record of a major historical event. This is achieved through the use of appropriate materials and design elements. As a digger statue it is representative of the most popular form of memorial in Queensland.

The place is important because of its aesthetic significance.

The memorial and its setting are a landmark within Dalby and contribute to the aesthetic qualities of the townscape. The memorial and gates are of aesthetic significance for their high degree of workmanship and design.

The place has a strong or special association with a particular community or cultural group for social, cultural or spiritual reasons.

It has a strong and continuing association with the community as evidence of the impact of a major historic event and as the focal point for the remembrance of that event.

The place has a special association with the life or work of a particular person, group or organisation of importance in Queensland's history.

It also has special association with the firms involved in its erection including sculptors John Whitehead and Sons (London), masons J Shill (Dalby) and metalworker Ernest Gunderson (Brisbane) as examples of their work.
