= Dalby Town Council Chambers and Offices =

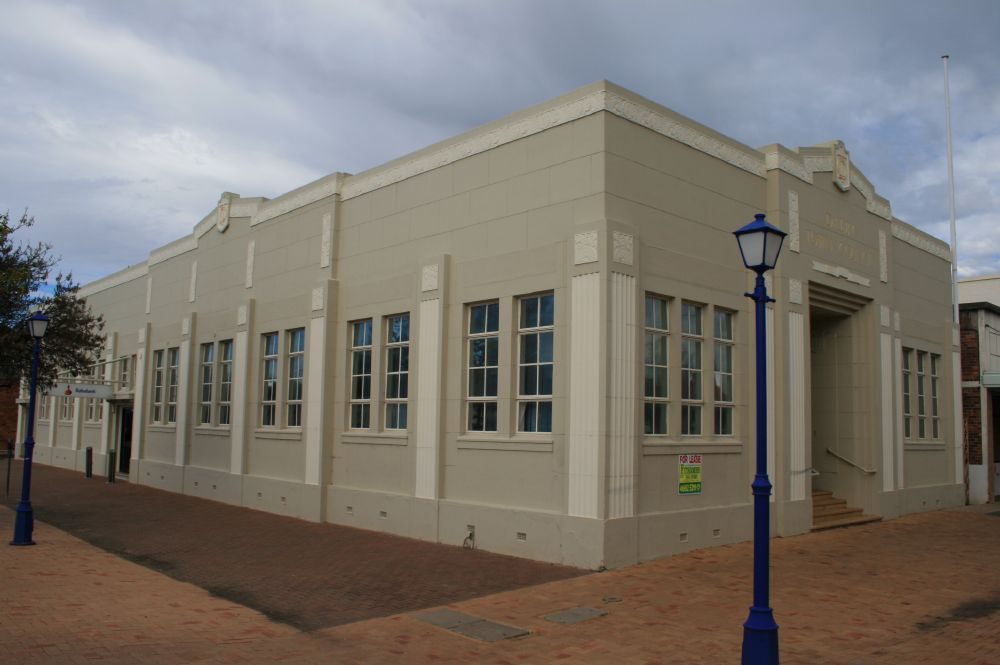
- Dalby Town Council Chambers and Offices, 2008

- Location within Queensland Location within Australia
- 27.1832°S 151.2644°E
- Location: 133 Cunningham Street, Dalby, Western Downs Region, Queensland, Australia

History
- Design period: 1919–1930s (interwar period)
- Built: 1932

Site notes
- Architect: Hall & Phillips

Queensland Heritage Register
- Official name: Dalby Town Council Chambers and Offices (former), Darling Downs Northern School Support Centre
- Type: state heritage (built)
- Designated: 23 July 1999
- Reference no.: 601018
- Significant period: 1930s (historical); 1932–ongoing (social); 1930s (fabric)
- Significant components: counter, strong room, furniture/fittings, views to, council chamber/meeting room, lead light/s

Dalby Town Council Chambers and Offices is a heritage-listed former town hall at 133 Cunningham Street, Dalby, Western Downs Region, Queensland, Australia. It was designed by Hall & Phillips and built in 1932. It is also known as Darling Downs Northern School Support Centre. It was added to the Queensland Heritage Register on 23 July 1999.

== History ==
The former Dalby Town Council Chambers and Offices, the third to be built, were constructed in 1932 to a design by Hall and Phillips Architects. Hill and Brown's tender for £5075 for the combined Council Chambers and School of Arts was accepted on 4 August 1931.

The first settlement of Myall Creek (Dalby) occurred when Henry Stuart Russell built a slab and bark hut in 1846 for the use of Samual Stewart and his family. Stewart had been Russell's hut keeper at Cecil Plains for five years prior to moving to Myall Creek. A number of similar buildings were constructed in the same area over the following years. After several approaches to the New South Wales Government by residents (the separation of Queensland had not occurred), surveyor EO Moriaty was instructed to lie out a township of one square mile at Myall Creek. Due to a mistake in the flood levels however, the New South Wales Government did not accept this 1852 survey plan. In 1853, Captain Samuel Augustus Perry, Assistant Surveyor General was sent to resurvey the site for urban settlement. The nucleus of the township was laid out on the grid plan regulations adopted by Ralph Darling, Governor of New South Wales. It was Captain Perry who renamed the town "Dalby".

The first official land sales occurred in April 1857. By 1855, the Dalby Police District had been declared with a Chief Constable and a court of Petty Sessions. The Town of Dalby was proclaimed a municipality in 1863 by Sir George Bowen, Governor of Queensland. The new municipality had a Town Council of six, led by Mayor Frederick Roche. Dalby's first town hall and council offices stood on a Reserve in Scarlett Street. The area also included a Reserve for a School of Arts. In 1889 this building was destroyed by fire. The Council moved again, only to have the building destroyed by fire in 1909. Following the fire, the Council relocated to new premises in Marble Street. This was a dual purpose building combining the Council Chambers and the town clerk's residence.

During this time, the School of Arts branch of the Council had moved to the corner of Cunningham and Stuart Streets. This area was becoming more popular with local businesses and, in 1930, following a fire which destroyed the School of Arts building, the third Council Chamber Offices were built on the site. The old Marble Street office was removed to Kaimkillenbun where it was altered and renovated to become the Roman Catholic Church of that district.

The Dalby Town Council Chambers and Offices were opened on Saturday 13 February 1932 by the Hon Arthur Edward Moore, Premier of Queensland. The Mayor of Dalby at the time was Alderman Thomas Jack. Dalby's Town Clerk, Mr Thorley, acted voluntarily as Superintendent of works. The building incorporated a School of Arts. Insurance from the damage to the old School of Arts building helped to fund the construction of the new Council Chambers with the Dalby Town Council contributing £4000 to the overall cost of construction. As the Council had had problems with fire in the past, the new Chamber Offices included a strong room which housed valuable books and records. Extensions to the School of Arts were opened by Premier Ned Hanlon on 16 November 1935.

The building is no longer the seat of local government. It has previously been occupied by Education Queensland and the Darling Downs Northern School Support Centre. In 2016 it houses the Dalby Chamber of Commerce & Industry and other commercial tenants.

== Description ==
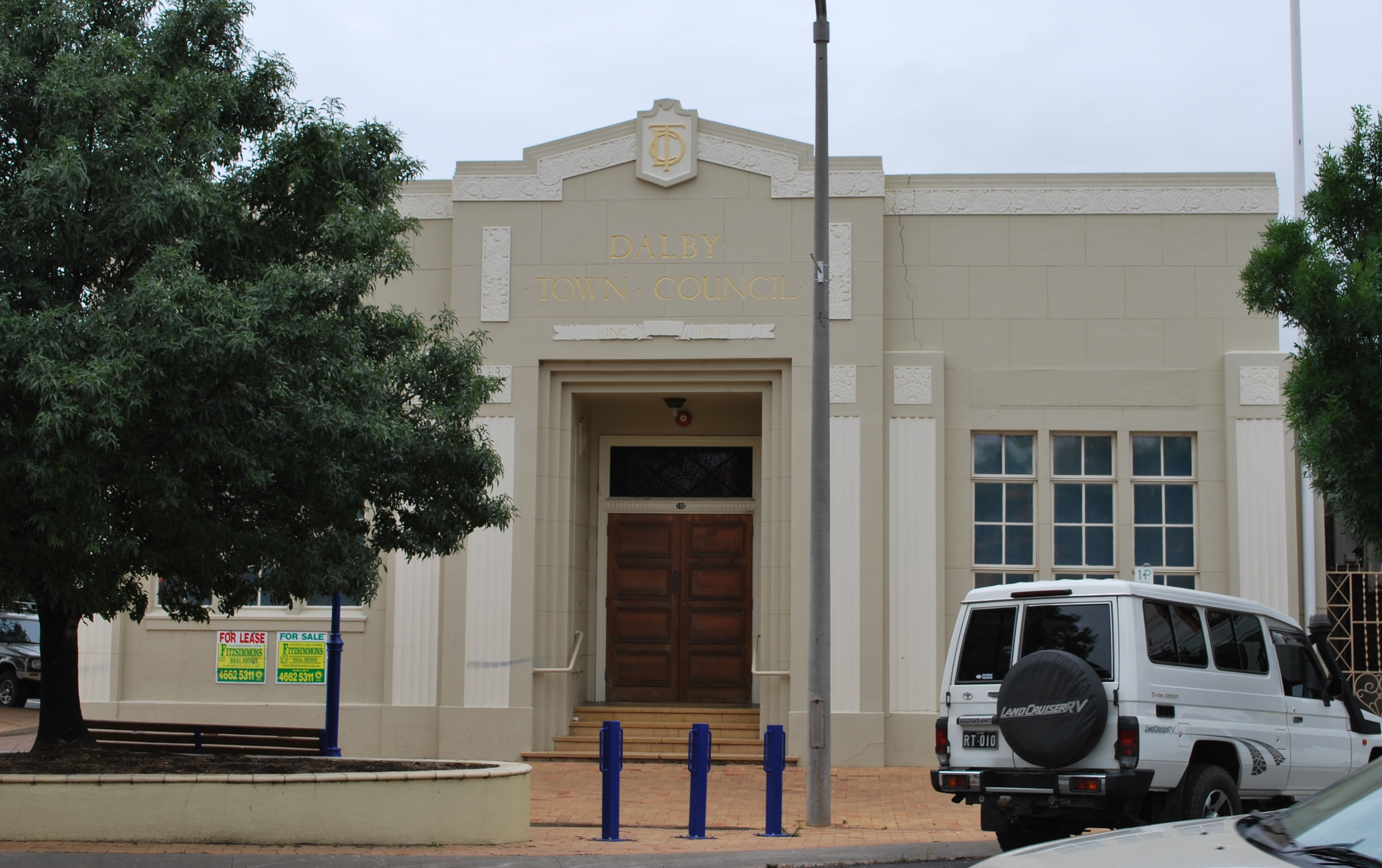
Front view, 2008

The former Dalby Town Council Chambers and Offices is a single storey rendered brick building on the corner of Cunningham and Stuart Streets and Groom Lane. The Cunningham Street section has a symmetrical facade with art deco detailing, consisting of a centrally located, projecting portico with a recessed entrance, flanked by three long, narrow casement windows surrounded by moulded architraves. Fluted pilasters are located on each side of the windows. The double, timber-panelled entrance doors have a breezeway with decorative leadlighting.

Similar window and decorative detail continue along the Stuart Street facade, which is divided into ten bays by pilasters. The moulded parapet forms a gable in the centre of the facade with the Dalby Town Council's shield located at the centre of the gable. The south elevation (Groom Lane side) and the western elevation are face brick.

Internally, the building comprises the highly intact, centrally located, former Council Chambers and extant strong room. The Council Chambers has a parquet floor, a timber dado on all four walls with timber screenings on the windows. A gap in the wall showing brickwork indicates where a plaque was located giving names of Dalby Council members. Changes have occurred to the other offices with the installation of screens to provide for office space, the ceiling has also been lowered.

In the front office, which contains the original timber public counter, the ceiling is decorative plaster with decorative cornices are located in the office which contains the strong room. A brass plaque fixed to the wall commemorates the opening of the former Council Chambers by the Premier.

== Heritage listing ==
The former Dalby Town Council Chambers and Offices was listed on the Queensland Heritage Register on 23 July 1999 having satisfied the following criteria.

The place is important in demonstrating the evolution or pattern of Queensland's history.

The former Dalby Town Council Chambers is significant as it demonstrates the growth and development of Dalby and the surrounding area and the increasing self confidence placed in the town by the Council and by the local population.

As the site of the School of Arts prior to the construction of the hall, and with the building housing a School of Arts when constructed, the place demonstrates the continued public use of the property for over 60 years.

The place demonstrates rare, uncommon or endangered aspects of Queensland's cultural heritage.

The former Dalby Town Council Chambers, a brick and concrete rendered building, is significant as one of only about six buildings extant in Dalby dating from the early 1930s. Other buildings include the former Wambo Shire Council Chambers and the Dalby Fire Station, both of which have Georgian elements in their designs and the former Union Bank. Internally, contributing to its significance, the former meeting room of the Dalby Town Council remains highly intact with timber panelling and screening.

The place is important in demonstrating the principal characteristics of a particular class of cultural places.

The former Dalby Town Council Chambers is significant as example of an interwar building with Art Deco elements especially the decorative moulded relief work.

The place is important because of its aesthetic significance.

Located at the corner of Cunningham Street, the unpretentious yet elegant building provides an integral civic contribution to the streetscape.

The place has a strong or special association with a particular community or cultural group for social, cultural or spiritual reasons.

Further, it held a long association with the people of Dalby and surrounding areas as a focal point for social, and community functions.

The place has a special association with the life or work of a particular person, group or organisation of importance in Queensland's history.

The former Dalby Town Council Chambers is significant for its association with the well-known Brisbane architectural firm, Hall and Phillips, in practice from 1929 to 1948. Thomas Ramsay Hall had previously been in partnership with George Gray Prentice as Hall and Prentice.
