= Jimbour =

Jimbour may refer to:

Australia

- Jimbour, Queensland, a town in Queensland
- Jimbour East, Queensland, a locality in Queensland
- Jimbour West, Queensland, a locality in Queensland
- Jimbour Station, a pastoral run in Queensland
- Jimbour Homestead, a heritage-listed homestead of the pastoral run (also called Jimbour House)
- Jimbour Dry Stone Wall, a heritage-listed stone wall built on the pastoral run
