= Dalby–Jandowae Road =

Road in Queensland, Australia

Dalby–Jandowae Road Queensland

General information
- Type: Rural road
- Length: 47.3 km (29 mi)
- Route number(s): State Route 82 (Dalby – Jandowae)

Major junctions
- South end: Warrego Highway Dalby
- Macalister-Bell Road
- North end: Jandowae Connection Road Jandowae; Kingaroy–Jandowae Road (George Street)

Location(s)
- Major settlements: Jimbour

Dalby–Jandowae Road is a continuous 47.3 kilometres (29.4 mi) road route in the Western Downs region of Queensland, Australia. The road is signed as State Route 82. Dalby–Jandowae Road (number 421) is a state-controlled regional road.

== Route Description ==
The Dalby–Jandowae Road commences at an intersection with the Warrego Highway (A2) in Dalby. It runs north through Pirrinuan and the south-western corner of Jimbour East, where it passes the exit to Macalister–Bell Road before passing between Jimbour East and Jimbour West, and then between Jimbour West and Cooranga. The road enters Jandowae as High Street and ends at an intersection with George Street, which runs east to become Kingaroy–Jandowae Road. The physical road continues north as Jandowae Connection Road (High Street) (State Route 82).

Land use along this road is almost exclusively crop farming. The former railway line followed the road for most of its length.

== Road condition ==
Dalby–Jandowae Road is fully sealed. The steepest incline on the road is only about 3%.

== Intersecting state-controlled roads ==
The following state-controlled roads intersect with this road:

- Macalister–Bell Road
- Kingaroy–Jandowae Road
- Jandowae Connection Road

=== Macalister–Bell Road ===
Macalister–Bell Road
- Location: Warrego Highway, Macalister to Bunya Highway, Bell
- Length: 40.4 km (25.1 mi)

Macalister–Bell Road is a state-controlled district road (number 422), rated as a local road of regional significance (LRRS). It runs from the Warrego Highway in Macalister to the Bunya Highway in Bell, crossing Dalby–Jandowae Road in Jimbour East, a distance of 40.4 kilometres (25.1 mi). The road has no other major intersections.

=== Kingaroy–Jandowae Road ===
Kingaroy–Jandowae Road
- Location: Dalby–Jandowae Road, Jandowae to Bunya Highway, Cooranga
- Length: 39.2 km (24.4 mi)

Kingaroy–Jandowae Road is a state-controlled district road (number 424), rated as a local road of regional significance (LRRS). It runs from Dalby–Jandowae Road in Jandowae to the Bunya Highway in Cooranga, a distance of 39.2 kilometres (24.4 mi). It intersects with Niagara Road in Jandowae. The intersection with the Bunya Highway is about 56.1 kilometres (34.9 mi) south-west of Kingaroy.

=== Jandowae Connection Road ===
Jandowae Connection Road
- Location: Jandowae to Jinghi
- Length: 15.3 km (9.5 mi)
- Route number: 82

Jandowae Connection Road is a state-controlled regional road (number 423). It is part of State Route 82. It runs 15.3 kilometres (9.5 mi) from Jandowae to the Chinchilla–Wondai Road in Jinghi. The road has no major intersections.

== State Route 82 ==
State Route 82 follows a number of separately named roads from Tingoora (near Wondai) to Inglewood. It is not necessarily the best or the shortest or the quickest route between the two termini. It was proclaimed as a State Route because, at the time, it was the most convenient route for many users. It is also an example of why motorists in unfamiliar territory should follow a designated route rather than rely on a vehicle navigation system, which may direct them onto less suitable alternative roads.

The route follows Chinchilla–Wondai Road west from Tingoora to Durong, where it turns south to Jinghi. Here the Chinchilla–Wondai Road turns west, while State Route 82 continues south on Jandowae Connection Road to Jandowae. In Jandowae the road name changes to Dalby–Jandowae Road, which continues to the Warrego Highway in the west of Dalby. From there it follows the Warrego Highway to the south-east until it reaches Dalby–Cecil Plains Road, where it continues south.

At a T-junction in Cecil Plains, State Route 82 turns east on Toowoomba–Cecil Plains Road until it reaches Pampas–Horrane Road, (Note: Horrane was a station on the former Cecil Plains railway line. It was situated adjacent to the intersection of Toowoomba–Cecil Plains Road and Pampas–Horrane Road in the locality of Cecil Plains.) where it turns south. Note that many navigation systems will suggest a turn to the west in Cecil Plains, leading to Millmerran–Cecil Plains Road. State Route 82 follows Pampas–Horrane Road to Pampas, where it meets the Gore Highway at a T-junction. From there it follows the Gore Highway south-west to Millmerran, where it turns south on the Millmerran–Inglewood Road. This road continues south to Inglewood, where it meets the Cunningham Highway at a T-junction.

== History ==
The Dalby area was settled in the 1840s, and a township was surveyed in 1853 and founded in 1854. A post office opened in 1855 and a school in 1861. The railway arrived in 1868, allowing the town to grow as the commercial centre for properties around it.

Canaga pastoral run was taken up in the early 1850s, and in 1853 was transferred to members of the Bell family, the owners of Jimbour Station. Jinghi Jinghi pastoral run, which existed in 1849, is believed to have been part of Jimbour.

From its inception in 1842, Jimbour grew to be a massive collection of pastoral runs through purchase of nearby leases. At its peak it occupied 222,000 acres (90,000 ha) across the Western Downs. In 1877, 40,000 acres (16,000 ha) of land was resumed to establish smaller farms. The location of these is unknown, but some may have been in localities near Jandowae. Farms and villages were eventually established, with Canaga opening a school in 1911 and Jinghi in 1915.

Jandowae was settled in the 1860s and opened its first school in 1877. It became the source of foodstuffs and other supplies for settlers in the surrounding localities, including Cooranga, Diamondy, Langlands and Tuckerang, as well as those mentioned above. A reliable road connection to Dalby was needed to provide access to markets and larger items of equipment. The road was the only viable link until 1914, when the railway arrived.

== Major intersections ==
All distances are from Google Maps. The entire road is in the Western Downs local government area.

Location	km	mi	Destinations	Notes
Dalby	0	0.0	Warrego Highway (A2) – southeast – Oakey, Toowoomba – northwest – Macalister, Chinchilla	Southern end of Dalby–Jandowae Road. Road runs north as State Route 82.
Jimbour East	24.5	15.2	Macalister–Bell Road – southwest – Macalister – northeast – Bell	
Jandowae	47.3	29.4	Jandowae Connection Road (High Street) (State Route 82) – northwest – Jinghi; Kingaroy–Jandowae Road (George Street) – northeast – Cooranga, Kumbia; George Street – southwest – Jandowae CBD	Northern end of Dalby–Jandowae Road
1.000 mi = 1.609 km; 1.000 km = 0.621 mi

== See also ==
- List of road routes in Queensland
- List of numbered roads in Queensland
