= Pirrinuan, Queensland =

Pirrinuan
- Suburb
- Interactive map of Pirrinuan
- Coordinates: 27.0475°S 151.2377°E
- Country: Australia
- State: Queensland
- LGA: Western Downs Region
- Location: 16.2 km (10.1 mi) N of Dalby; 98.6 km (61.3 mi) NW of Toowoomba; 224 km (139 mi) WNW of Brisbane

Government
  - State electorate: Warrego
  - Federal division: Maranoa

Area
  - Total: 141.5 km^{2} (54.6 sq mi)

Population
  - Total: 221 (2021 census)
  - Density: 1.562/km^{2} (4.045/sq mi)
- Time zone: UTC+10:00 (AEST)
- Postcode: 4405
Suburbs around Pirrinuan
Macalister	Jimbour East	Jimbour East
Macalister	Pirrinuan	Kaimkillenbun
Dalby	Dalby	Dalby

Pirrinuan is a rural locality in the Western Downs Region, Queensland, Australia. In the 2021 census, Pirrinuan had a population of 221 people.

== Geography ==
The Dalby–Jandowae Road (State Route 82) enters the locality from the south (Dalby) and exits to the north (Jimbour East).

The now-abandoned Jandowae railway line entered the locality from the south (Dalby) and exited to the north (Jimbour East), running immediately parallel and west of the Dalby–Jandowae Road. The locality was served by two railway stations:

- Pirrinuan railway station (27.0331°S 151.2355°E)
- Karingal railway station (27.07889°S 151.23861°E)

== History ==
Pirrinuan State School opened on 21 August 1911. It closed in January 1932 due to low student numbers. It was on Dead Horse Lane (approx 27.04585°S 151.28012°E).

The school reopened in 1937. It closed circa 1963. It was on Dalby Jandowae Road to the immediate north-east of the railway station (approx 27.0305°S 151.2372°E).

== Demographics ==
In the 2016 census, Pirrinuan had a population of 193 people.

In the 2021 census, Pirrinuan had a population of 221 people.

== Education ==
There are no schools in Pirrinuan. The nearest government primary schools are Jimbour State School in neighbouring Jimbour East to the north and Dalby State School in neighbouring Dalby to the south. The nearest government secondary school is Dalby State High School, also in Dalby. There are also non-government schools in Dalby.
