= Jimbour West, Queensland =

Jimbour West
- Suburb
- Interactive map of Jimbour West
- Coordinates: 26.875°S 151.0925°E
- Country: Australia
- State: Queensland
- LGA: Western Downs Region
- Location: 44.9 km (27.9 mi) NNW of Dalby; 61.8 km (38.4 mi) ESE of Chinchilla; 126 km (78 mi) NW of Toowoomba; 254 km (158 mi) WNW of Brisbane

Government
  - State electorate: Callide
  - Federal division: Maranoa

Area
  - Total: 236.7 km^{2} (91.4 sq mi)
- Elevation: 340 m (1,120 ft)

Population
  - Total: 97 (2021 census)
  - Density: 0.4098/km^{2} (1.061/sq mi)
- Time zone: UTC+10:00 (AEST)
- Postcode: 4406
Suburbs around Jimbour West
Tuckerang	Jandowae	Cooranga
Warra	Jimbour West	Jimbour East
Macalister	Macalister	Macalister

Jimbour West is a rural locality in the Western Downs Region, Queensland, Australia. In the 2021 census, Jimbour West had a population of 97 people.

== Geography ==
Jimbour West is bounded to the east by the Dalby–Jandowae Road.

The land is flat at elevation 340 metres (1,120 ft) above sea level.

The predominant land use is cropping.

Kuyura is a neighbourhood (26.9°S 151.1833°E) around the former Kuyuru railway station (26.9031°S 151.1899°E) on the closed Jandowae railway line. There were two other stations on the line in Jimbour West:

- Cresley railway station (26.8748°S 151.1780°E)
- Marnhull railway station (26.8429°S 151.1610°E)

== History ==
The locality takes its name from the town of Jimbour, which in turn takes its name from the pastoral run Jimbour Station, which was named in 1841 by pastoralist Henry Dennis using an Aboriginal word meaning either sheep or good grass.

== Demographics ==
In the 2016 census, Jimbour West had a population of 56 people.

In the 2021 census, Jimbour West had a population of 97 people.

== Economy ==
There are a number of homesteads in the locality:

- Birriwa (26.8881°S 151.1142°E)
- Bundarra (26.8911°S 151.1514°E)
- Carmyle (26.9437°S 151.0749°E)
- Coolibah (26.9367°S 151.0370°E)
- Coondara (26.9439°S 151.1250°E)
- Cresley (26.8800°S 151.1795°E)
- Deloraine (26.9187°S 151.1937°E)
- Driffield (26.8458°S 151.1534°E)
- Kantara (26.9313°S 151.0894°E)
- Kensington (26.8799°S 151.0301°E)
- Kenyon Downs (26.9316°S 151.1413°E)
- Lake Success (26.8490°S 151.0901°E)
- Lynthorpe (26.8718°S 151.0467°E)
- Macroom (26.8937°S 151.1287°E)
- Mungula (26.9017°S 151.0164°E)
- Newfed (26.9006°S 151.0968°E)
- Obyland (26.9470°S 151.1513°E)
- Quinden (26.8646°S 151.0687°E)
- South Wyobie (26.9041°S 151.0058°E)
- Tarana (26.9497°S 151.1727°E)
- The Towers (26.8518°S 151.1460°E)
- Walmer (26.8666°S 151.0900°E)
- Walugra (26.9022°S 151.0695°E)
- Warraway (26.8741°S 151.0343°E)
- Wyobie (26.8959°S 151.0860°E)

== Education ==
There are no schools in Jimbour West. The nearest government primary schools are Jandowae State School in neighbouring Jandowae to the north, Jimbour State School in neighbouring Jimbour East to the south-east and Warra State School in neighbouring Warra to the south-west. Jandowae State School provides secondary education to Year 10. For secondary education to Year 12, the nearest government schools are Dalby State High School in Dalby to the south-east and Chinchilla State High School in Chinchilla to the west .
