= Kaimkillenbun =

- Town
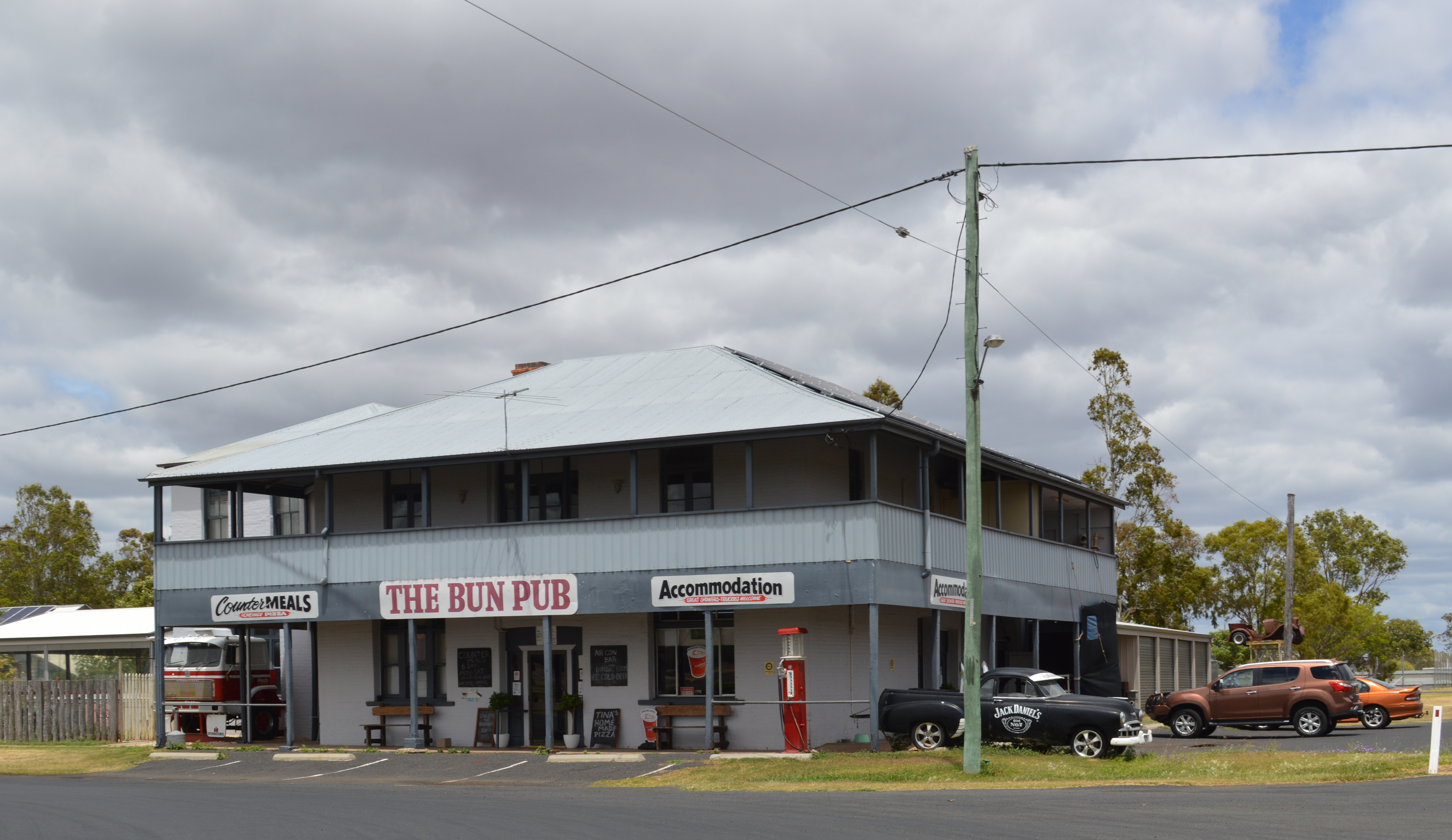
- The "Bun Pub", 2017

- Interactive map of Kaimkillenbun
- Coordinates: 27.0608°S 151.4347°E
- Country: Australia
- State: Queensland
- LGA: Western Downs Region
- Location: 27.5 km (17.1 mi) NE of Dalby; 92.8 km (57.7 mi) NW of Toowoomba; 221 km (137 mi) WNW of Brisbane

Government
  - State electorate: Warrego
  - Federal division: Maranoa

Area
  - Total: 208.1 km^{2} (80.3 sq mi)

Population
  - Total: 248 (2021 census)
  - Density: 1.1917/km^{2} (3.087/sq mi)
- Time zone: UTC+10:00 (AEST)
- Postcode: 4406
Localities around Kaimkillenbun
Jimbour East	Bell	Moola
Pirrinuan	Kaimkillenbun	Moola
Dalby	Irvingdale	Irvingdale

Kaimkillenbun is a rural town and locality in the Western Downs Region, Queensland, Australia. In the 2021 census, the locality of Kaimkillenbun had a population of 248 people.

It is recognised as the Queensland town with the longest single-word name, but is affectionately known by locals as "The Bun".

== Geography ==
Kaimkillenbun is 24 kilometres (15 mi) from Dalby, on the way to the Bunya Mountains and is part of the Darling Downs.

The south-eastern half of the locality is predominantly flat farming land centred on the town. The northern part of the locality has hills including:

- Rocky Point (26.9961°S 151.3582°E) 460 metres (1,510 ft) above sea level
- Squaretop (Tchaboogenin) (27.0153°S 151.4133°E) 554 metres (1,818 ft) above sea level

Minerals including opals can be found at Squaretop.

== Road infrastructure ==
The Dalby–Cooyar Road runs through from south to east. The Bell-Kaimkillenbun Road runs to the north, and the Bunya Mountains Road runs to the north-east from the eastern boundary.. The Bunya Highway passes through the north-west of the locality.

== History ==
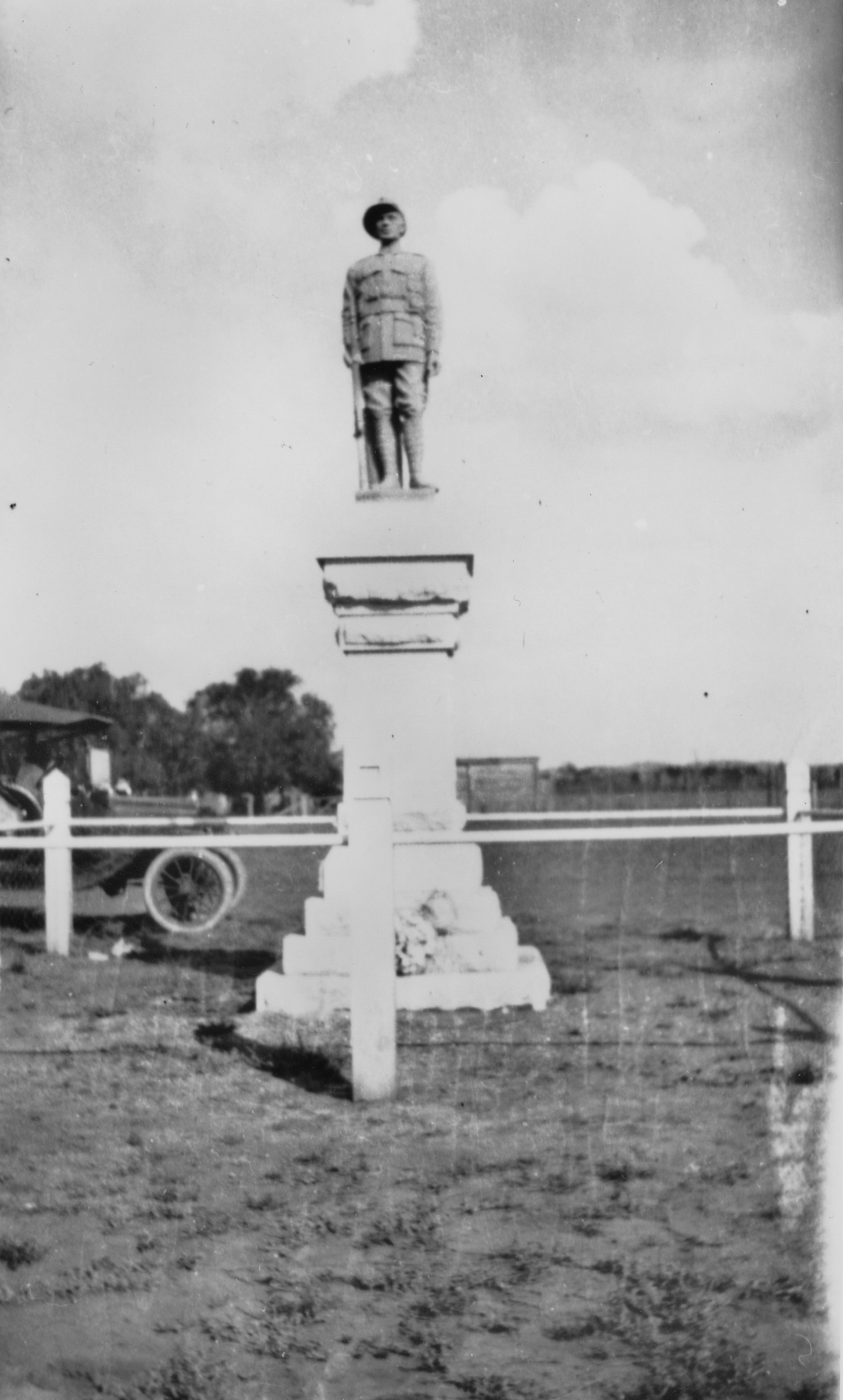
1920

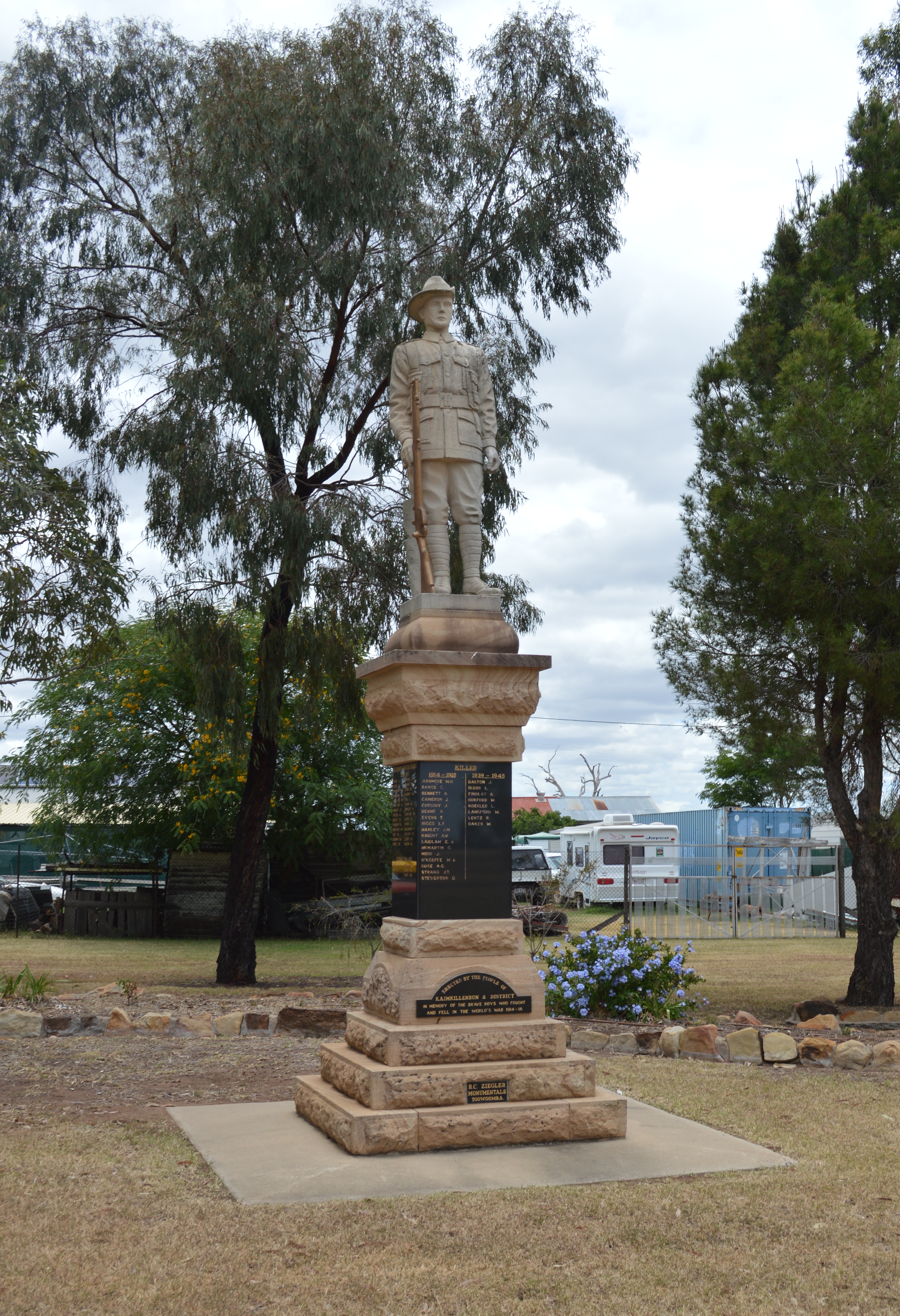
2017

The war memorial at Kaimkillenbun

The name Kaimkillenbun is believed to derive from an Aboriginal word meaning open mouth, possibly associated with a male initiation ceremony.

Black Gully Provisional School opened circa 1891 but was quickly renamed Yamsion Provisional School. On 1 January 1909 it became Yamsion State School. Between 1911 and 1916 it operated as a part-time school in conjunction with the King's Tent Provisional School (meaning the two schools shared a single teacher). In 1917 Yamsion State School returned to being a full-time school. It finally closed circa 1967.

The Bell Branch railway line from Dalby to Bell operated between 1906 and 1984 with the locality being served by the following now-abandoned railway stations:

- Moffatt railway station (27.0915°S 151.3970°E)
- Kaimkillenbun railway station, serving the town (27.0598°S 151.4352°E)
- Squaretop railway station (27.0150°S 151.4483°E)

An attempt was made to establish a hotel in 1908 but the local temperance lobby managed to prevent it. However, in October 1911 local farmer Edwin Higgs successfully obtained a licence and built the Kenilworth Hotel. Soldiers leaving for World War I signed on the wall of the pub. Today it is known as The Bun Pub.

Kaimkillenbun Post Office opened by June 1909 (a receiving office had been open from 1908).

Kaimkillenbun State School opened on 1 November 1909.

St Mary's Anglican Church was dedicated on 6 September 1914 by Venerable Henry Le Fanu, Archdeacon of Toowoomba. It closed circa 1997.

Squaretop State School opened on 24 September 1919. It closed in 1959. It was on Squaretop Road just west of the Bell Kaimkillenbun Road (27.0152°S 151.44586°E).

The Kaimkillenbun war memorial was unveiled on 13 November 1920 by William Vowles, the member of the Queensland Legislative Assembly for Dalby and Leader of the Opposition. The "digger" statue was made by R C Ziegler, a Toowoomba stonemason. Originally placed near the Kaimkillenbun railway station, the memorial was damaged in a traffic accident. A replacement from the original plans was commissioned from the Zieglers and was placed in a park behind the hotel (corner of Isabelle and Delacey Streets).

Lillingstone State School opened on 27 January 1925 and closed on 31 March 1934.

In 1983, Kaimkillenbun was the location for filming of the movie Chase Through the Night starring Nicole Kidman. Local residents appear as extras in the film.

== Demographics ==
In the 2011 census, the locality of Kaimkillenbun and the surrounding area had a population of 566 people.

In the 2016 census, the locality of Kaimkillenbun had a population of 293 people.

In the 2021 census, the locality of Kaimkillenbun had a population of 248 people.

== Economy ==
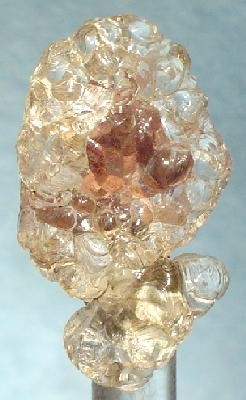
Opal from Squaretop

There are a number of homesteads in the locality:

- Aronui (26.9971°S 151.3423°E)
- Belle Claire (27.0545°S 151.3539°E)
- Belroy Park (27.0940°S 151.3953°E)
- Brentwood (27.0727°S 151.3465°E)
- Bundaleer (27.0722°S 151.4182°E)
- Doonside (26.9880°S 151.3470°E)
- Ellendale (27.0857°S 151.4659°E)
- Fairfields (27.0550°S 151.4253°E)
- Glengarry (27.0151°S 151.3903°E)
- Glenvale (27.0775°S 151.3466°E)
- Gregmore (26.9860°S 151.3837°E)
- Lea Mont (27.0345°S 151.3881°E)
- Lillingstone (27.0705°S 151.3729°E)
- Mornalea (27.0362°S 151.4744°E)
- Myall Park (27.0117°S 151.5026°E)
- Silverlea (27.0345°S 151.4787°E)
- Swanbrook (27.0499°S 151.3889°E)
- Tapiola (27.0460°S 151.3859°E)
- Wandilla (27.0607°S 151.3808°E)
- Yarraga (27.0292°S 151.3418°E)

== Education ==
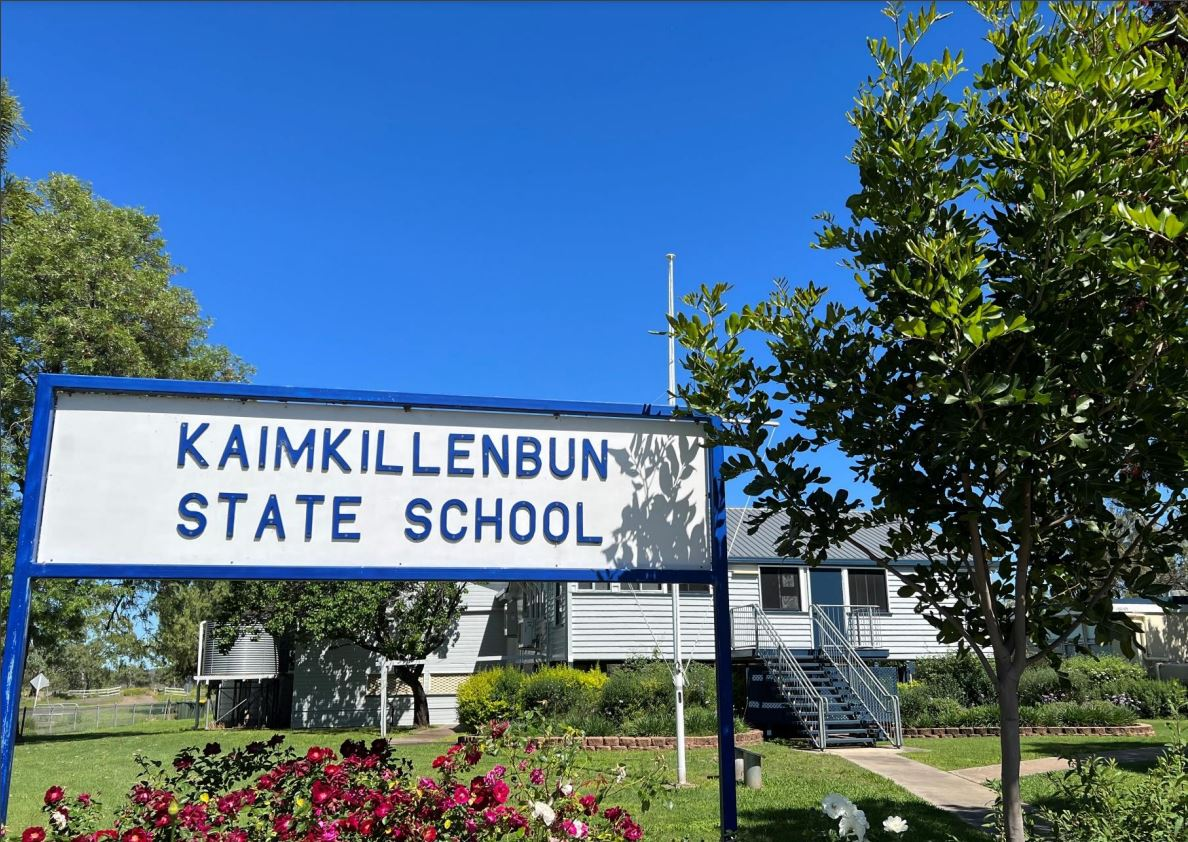
Kaimkillenbun State School, 2023

Kaimkillenbun State School is a government primary (Prep-6) school for boys and girls at 2-14 Messenger Street (27.0582°S 151.4320°E). In 2015, it had an enrolment of 33 students with 4 teachers (3 full-time equivalent) and 6 non-teaching staff (3 full-time equivalent). In 2018, the school had an enrolment of 17 students with 4 teachers (2 full-time equivalent) and 5 non-teaching staff (2 full-time equivalent).

There are no secondary schools in Kaimkillenbun. The nearest government secondary schools are Bell State School (to Year 10) in neighbouring Bell to the north, Quinalow State School (to Year 10) in Quinalow to the south-east and Dalby State High School (to Year 12) in neighbouring Dalby to the south-west.

== Amenities ==
Amenities in the town include the historic Bun Pub and a number of sporting clubs and organisations.

Kaimkillenbun Rural Fire Brigade is at 8 Moffat Street (27.0606°S 151.4343°E).

== Notable residents ==
- John Dorge, Olympic basketballer, born in Kaimkillenbun
