= Bell, Queensland =

Bell
- Town
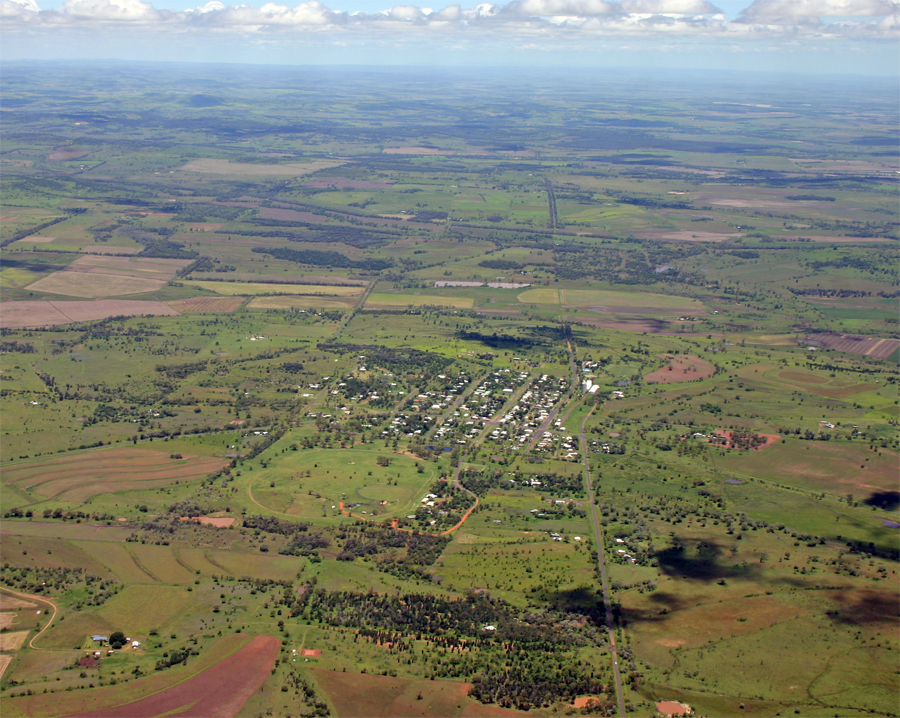
- Bell, seen from the air in 2010

- Interactive map of Bell
- Coordinates: 26.9333°S 151.4522°E
- Country: Australia
- State: Queensland
- LGA: Western Downs Region
- Location: 40.0 km (24.9 mi) NE of Dalby; 109 km (68 mi) NW of Toowoomba; 236 km (147 mi) WNW of Brisbane

Government
  - State electorate: Callide
  - Federal division: Maranoa

Area
  - Total: 128.4 km^{2} (49.6 sq mi)

Population
  - Total: 421 (2021 census)
  - Density: 3.279/km^{2} (8.492/sq mi)
- Time zone: UTC+10:00 (AEST)
- Postcode: 4408
Localities around Bell
Cooranga	Cooranga	Bunya Mountains
Jimbour East	Bell	Bunya Mountains
Kaimkillenbun	Kaimkillenbun	Moola

Bell is a rural town and locality in the Western Downs Region, Queensland, Australia. Bell is in the western foothills of the Bunya Mountains, 39 kilometres (24 mi) north of Dalby. In the 2021 census, the locality of Bell had a population of 421 people.

== Geography ==
Bell is on the Bunya Highway and lies between the agricultural areas of the Darling Downs and the South Burnett with rolling hills of quilt-like patterned farmland. The area's main industry is farming of beef cattle, grain, sheep and pigs.

There are a number of neighbourhoods in the locality:

- Koondai-i (26.9022°S 151.50177°E)
- Spring Flat(26.8833°S 151.3833°E)
- Warmga (26.9666°S 151.4666°E)
- Wonga (26.965°S 151.4677°E)

Summer Hill (26.8958°S 151.4122°E) rises to 464 metres (1,522 ft) above sea level.

== History ==
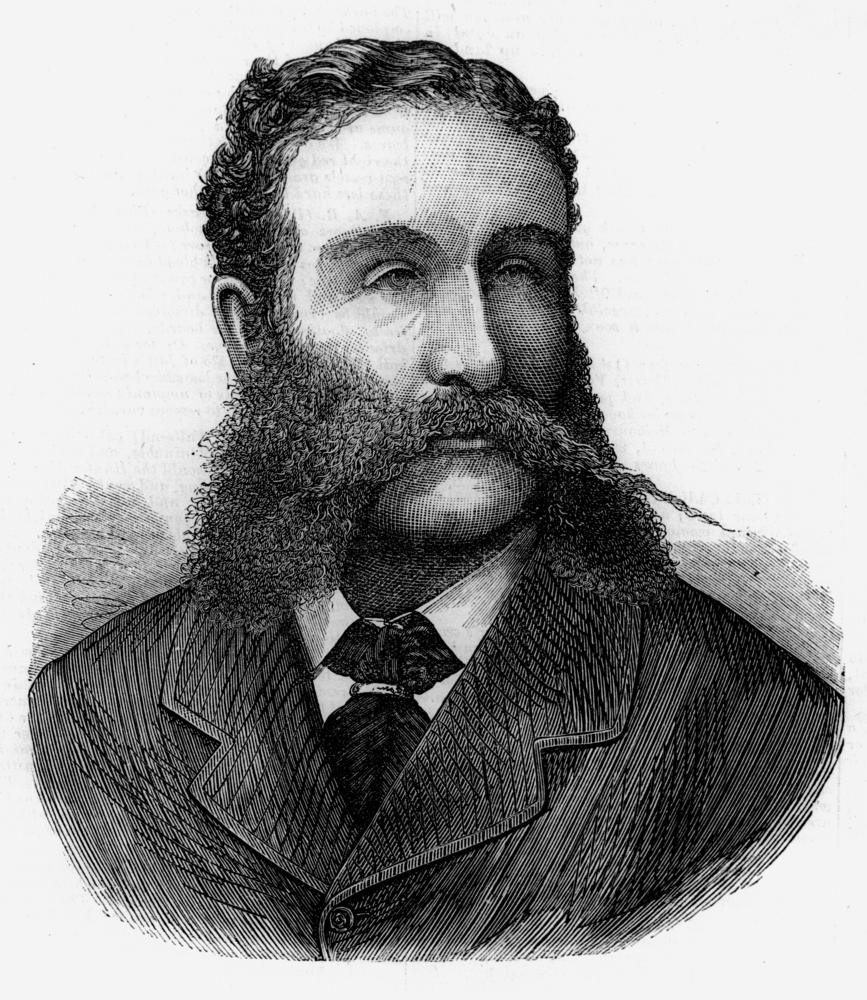
Sketch of Sir Joshua Peter Bell, 1881

Jarowair (also known as Yarowair, Yarow-wair, Barrunggam, Yarrowair, Yarowwair and Yarrow-weir) is one of the languages of the Toowoomba region. The Jarowair language region includes the landscape within the local government boundaries of the Toowoomba Regional Council, particularly Toowoomba north to Crows Nest and west to Oakey. Giabal is the Southern neighbour in Toowoomba City.

The name Koondai-i is believed to be the Indigenous name for the area.

The name Wonga, which is often interchangeable with "Warmga", may refer to the Wonga windmill.

Originally the area around what is now known as Bell was known as Cattle Creek and was part of a large land holding called Jimbour Station. In the early 1870s, the area was opened up for closer settlement and Angus & Christina McPhee, originally from Scotland, became the first European settlers nearest to what would become the village of Bell. Over time other families – including Bellingham, Bradley, Edwards, Ensor, McClelland, Rush and Walker – settled in the vicinity of Cattle Creek and in 1878 a school was established at Maida Hill to cater for these families. In February 1888, the Maida Hill Cemetery was surveyed and in August 1905 the cemetery became known as the Bell Cemetery. According to State Electoral Rolls, the first use of "Bell" as a town name was in mid-1905 however it was still inter-changeable with Cattle Creek as a description of the general area.

In May 1906, the Bell Branch railway line was opened linking to the Western railway line at Dalby with the following (now-abandoned) stations within the locality:

- Bell railway station (26.9339°S 151.4488°E)
- Koondai-I railway station (26.9470°S 151.4609°E)
- Warmga railway station (26.9694°S 151.4682°E)

With the opening of the railway 1,600 acres (650 ha) was resumed for the township and surveyed into town allotments. The first land sales in Bell were in May 1906 with 93 town lots and 15 suburban lots available with a total of 77 lots sold in the first auction. The village was named after Sir Joshua Peter Bell who, at that time, was owner of Jimbour Station.

Maida Hill Post Office opened on 8 September 1877. It was renamed Bell by 1898, Malakoff in 1907 and closed in 1930. Bell Railway Station Post Office opened by December 1906 and was renamed Bell Post Office in 1907.

Bell Provisional School opened on 4 November 1907 and the Bradley, McPhee and Shaw families feature strongly on the enrolments of 1907. On 1 January 1909, it became Bell State School. The school celebrated its centenary in 2007.

Bell Memorial Public Hall opened in 1917.

The railway continued to operate until 1994.

Bell Library opened in 2013.

== Demographics ==
In the 2016 census, the locality of Bell had a population of 502 people.

In the 2021 census, the locality of Bell had a population of 421 people.

== Education ==
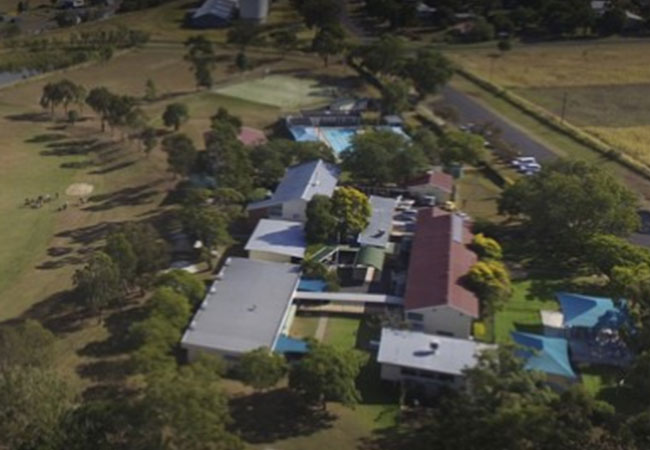
Aerial photo of Bell State School, 2024

Bell State School is a government primary and secondary (Prep–10) school for boys and girls at 90 Dennis Street (26.9397°S 151.4529°E). In 2018, the school had an enrolment of 88 students with 16 teachers (11 full-time equivalent) and 13 non-teaching staff (8 full-time equivalent).

For education to Year 12, the nearest government school is Dalby State High School in Dalby to the south-west.

== Amenities ==
The Bell Bunya Community Centre at 71 Maxwell Street houses the Bell Library, a branch of Western Downs Libraries.

Bell Memorial Public Hall is at 69 Wallace Street (26.9350°S 151.4518°E). The old Freemasons Hall is now home to a cafe.

== Events ==
Bell is known for its traditional country arts and crafts as well as rural-based activities such as horse race meetings, the rural show, rodeo and campdraft competitions.

The local agricultural show, which celebrated its 50th consecutive year in 2008, is held annually on the first weekend in March. The show features wood chopping, displays of the area's livestock (including milking goats), and working cattle dog 'trials'.

The Bell Races are a popular local event and held on the first Saturday in January every year.

== Attractions ==
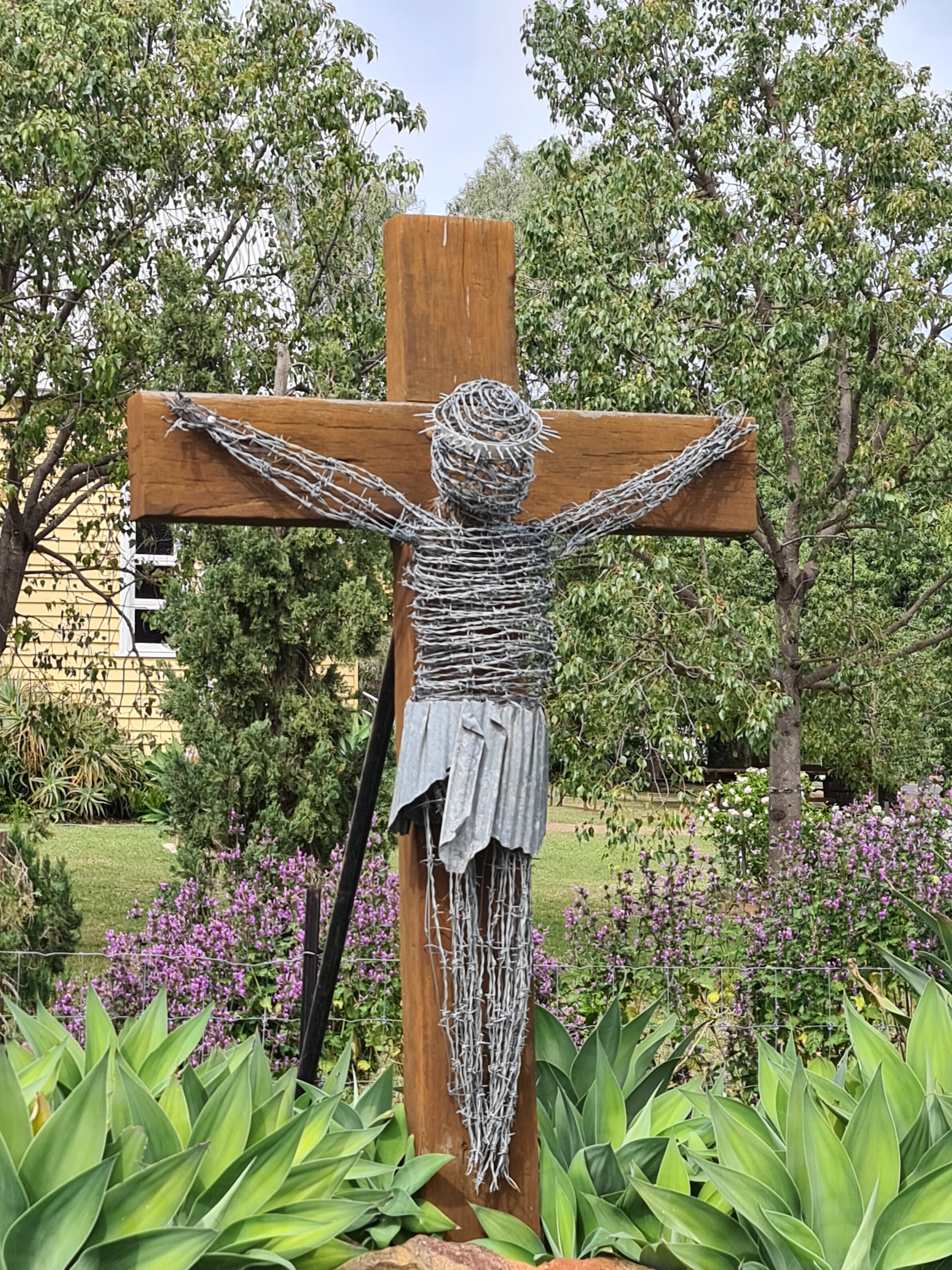
Barbed wire crucifix, in the Biblical Garden

The Railway Heritage Parkland, built on the site of the original railway terminus, features an early model diesel locomotive and a vintage passenger carriage as well as a historical mural painted on the shed wall.
