= Bell Branch railway line =

Former railway line in Queensland

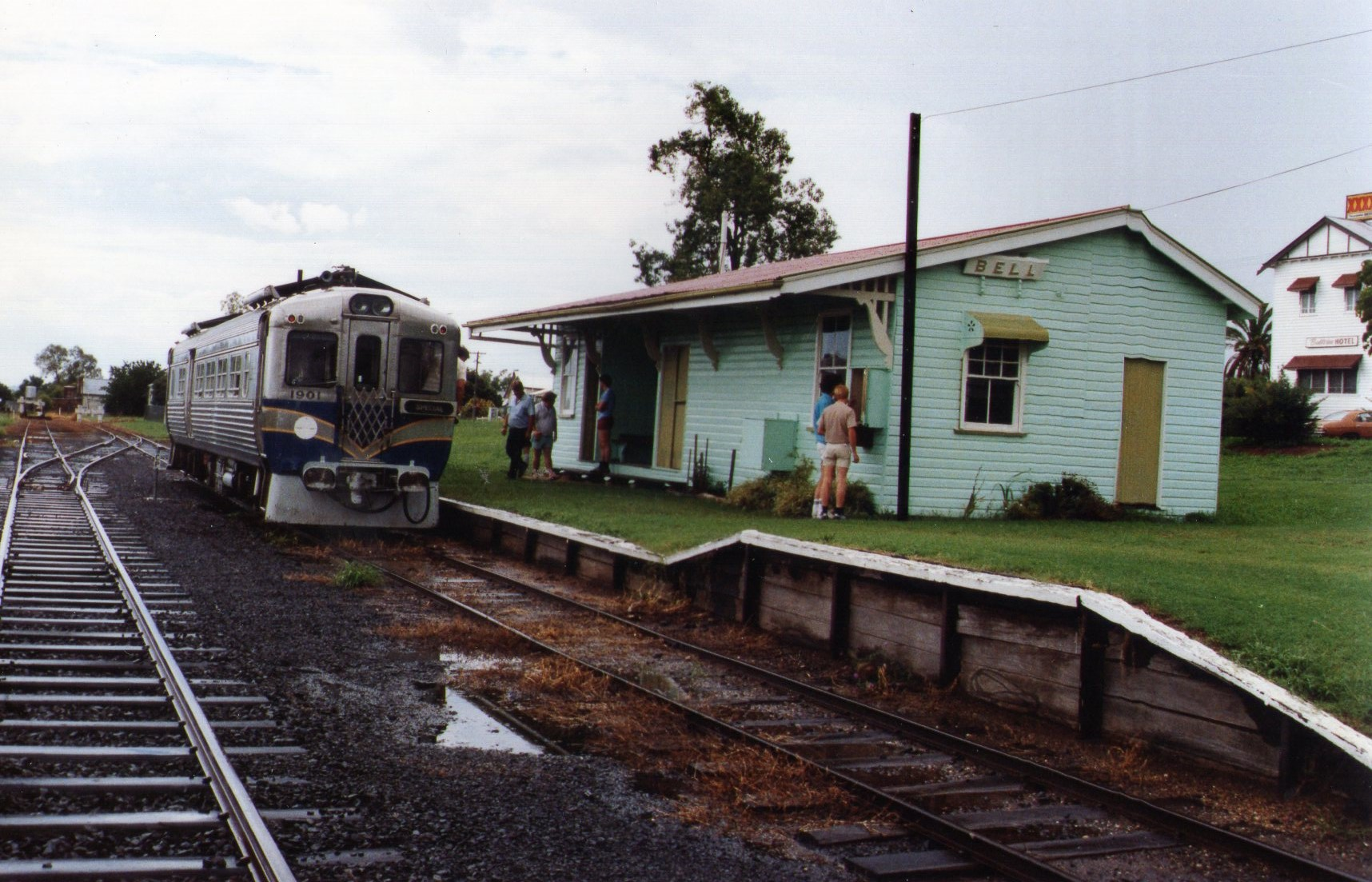
RM 1901 at Bell Station, ~1991

The Bell Branch Railway was a railway line from Dalby, on the Western line, to Bell in Queensland, Australia.

== History ==
In 1889 Queensland Parliament approved the construction of a line to run northeast from the Darling Downs town of Dalby to the Bunya Mountains but financial hardship prevented the commencement of work. In 1904 further approval enabled construction of a 39 km line to Cattle Creek, later renamed Bell after Lands Minister Sir Joshua Peter Bell.

The branch opened for business on 10 April 1906 and stops were established at Bonyumba, Sanatorium, Mocatta's Corner, Moffatt, Kaimkillenbun, Squaretop, Warmga and Koondai-i.

A daily service was initially provided, a thrice-weekly service sufficed by 1923 and a rail motor service prevailed between 1928 and 1956. During its time, goods transport was prolific. Farm produce was the initial mainstay but later cream traffic increased as did the carriage of wheat and timber from the Bunya Mountains.

The line was mothballed on 1 January 1994. The Bell station precinct has been restored and houses an historical display.
