= Jimbour Dry Stone Wall =

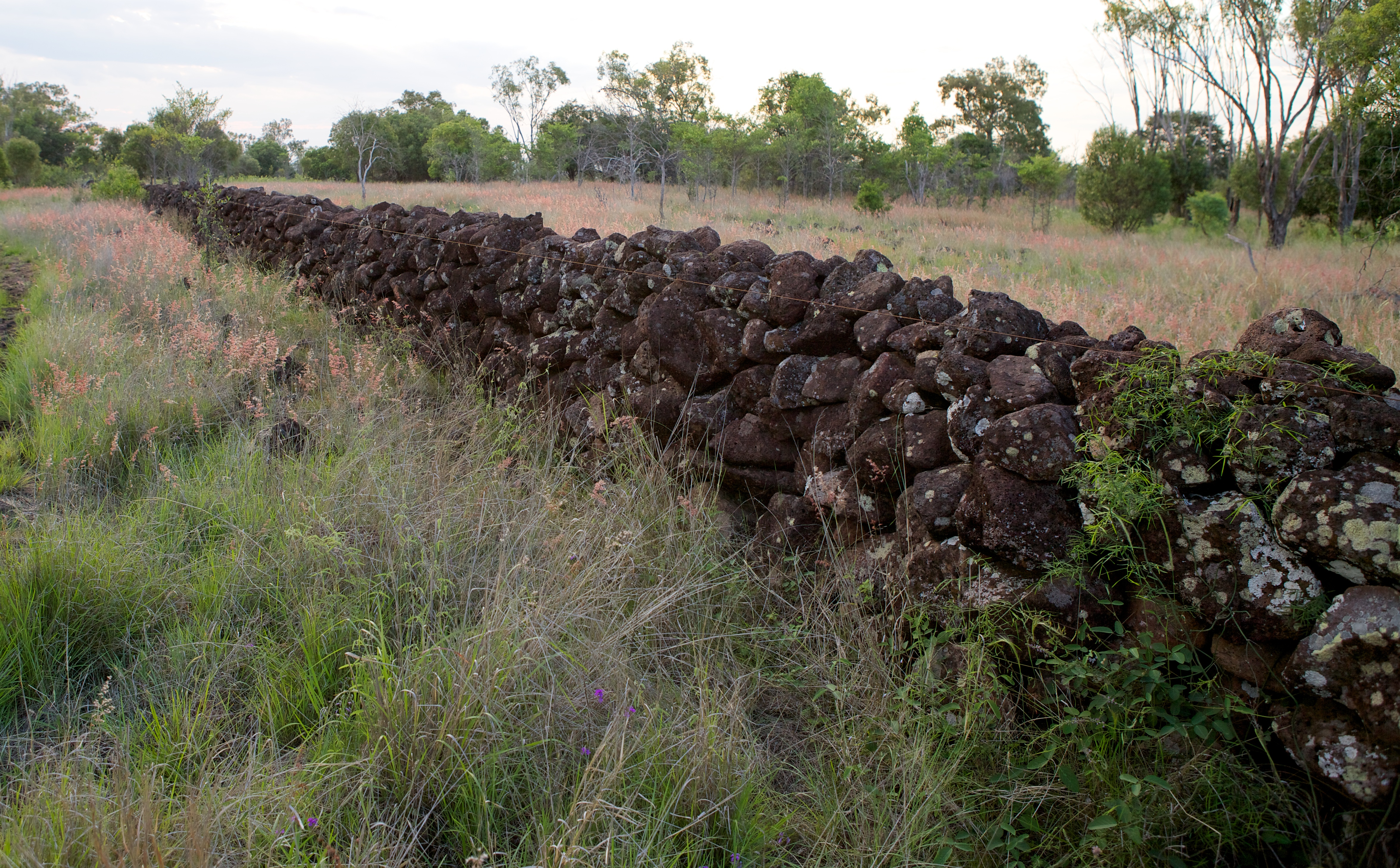
- Jimbour Dry Stone Wall, 2011

- Location within Queensland
- 26.9491°S 151.2854°E
- Location: Dalby–Jandowae Road, Jimbour East, Western Downs Region, Queensland, Australia

History
- Design period: 1840s–1860s (mid-19th century)
- Built: circa 1870s

Queensland Heritage Register
- Official name: Jimbour Dry Stone Wall
- Type: state heritage (landscape, built)
- Designated: 31 May 2005
- Reference no.: 602415
- Significant period: 1870s (historical)
- Significant components: wall/s

Jimbour Dry Stone Wall is a heritage-listed stone wall at Dalby-Jandowae Road, Jimbour East, Western Downs Region, Queensland, Australia. It was built c. 1870s. It is an example of the expertise of the settlers and management tools they had at the time. It was added to the Queensland Heritage Register on 31 May 2005.

== History ==
The Jimbour Dry Stone Wall is located on a low, stony ridge to the north of Jimbour Homestead, the former head station on the once expansive Jimbour pastoral run on the Darling Downs. The wall was constructed most likely during the 1870s, apparently as a barrier to prevent sheep from crossing the stony ridge, to keep dingoes from preying on the sheep and to prevent wallabies from destroying crops planted in paddocks close to the head station.

Dry stone walling is an ancient craft using stone with no mortar to construct a wall. It gained popularity in Britain during the late 18th and early 19th centuries during the enclosure movement and the practice was introduced to Australia during the mid-1800s. Traditionally each dry stone wall was constructed by laying two parallel outer walls of stones, which tapered inwards towards the top; filling the space between with smaller stones and rubble; then laying coping stones across the top to complete the wall. Dry stone walls were labour-intensive to construct and repair, but in areas where stone was readily available, for early land owners they could prove economical and more durable than timber fences, requiring less maintenance and being fireproof. For European settlers the walls also transformed the landscape into something that resembled their native homes, a process that has been described by one scholar as "colonisation by mimesis" and "a type of ground clearing that instituted one type of memorialisation over another".

In 1863/64 Messrs Bell & Sons, the pastoral lessees of Jimbour run, applied under right of pre-emptive purchase for the freehold of nine portions of land along Jimbour Creek and around Jimbour head station. Pre-emptive portion one included the eastern end of the Jimbour Ridge. The survey plan (D35119) on which this application was based and dated 2 January 1864, shows a number of timber fences across the property, but not a stone wall (or any type of fence) along the Jimbour Ridge. Certificate of title to these portions was granted to Messrs Bell & Sons in 1864.

With security of tenure, the Bells made extensive improvements on the Jimbour freehold during the 1870s. Stately Jimbour House, Queensland's grandest 19th century homestead, was erected 1874–77 and the dry stone wall was constructed likely around the same time, in a period when the station reached its peak as a 19th-century pastoral enterprise.

Following the extensive restoration of Jimbour House in 1925, The Queenslander newspaper printed a story about the property to celebrate the formal re-opening of the house. The article, written from notes by Harry Ensor, Joshua Peter Bell's overseerer, "right hand man" and building supervisor at Jimbour during the 1870s, records that the first plan was to build a log fence on the Jimbour Ridge, but the idea was abandoned due to the abundance of available stone. Instead, a dry stone wall was built for a length of about 4 miles (6.4 km). This wall was about 5 feet (1.5 m) high, 2 feet 6 inches (0.76 m) wide at the base and 18 inches (460 mm) wide at the top. Dubbed the "Great Wall of Jimbour", its construction proved to be a feat of human perseverance. The stony ground of the ridge meant that bullocks needed to be continuously shod and the workmen were forced to lace greenhide to their boots. The difficult terrain and extent of the wall would have made it a time-consuming task. Ensor recalled that the work gang leader, who first thought of the idea and supervised construction of the wall, became affectionately known as "Stonewall Jackson".

Ensor also claimed that the dry stone wall was built to divide the Jimbour run. It is not clear what is meant by this comment. An 1877 survey plan (A3441005 drawn by surveyor Martin Lavelle) of further Jimbour pre-emptive purchases shows the dry stone wall extending the length of a stony ridge (the Jimbour Ridge) to the north east of the station residence. By this time it appears the wall had been in place for several years, with the surveyor noting that the wall was in "a bad state being full of grass". However, the wall was not used as a boundary for any of the portions surveyed.

It seems more plausible that the wall was constructed as a barrier fence. Jimbour in the 1870s was a large sheep station still employing shepherds to manage the flocks. The stony ground of the ridge on which the wall was built would have been difficult to patrol on foot and Harry Ensor recollected how the "grass was on many occasions higher than the sheep" making it difficult to shepherd them. The stone wall was constructed to the traditional height required to enclose sheep and it seems likely the purpose of the wall was to prevent flocks wandering over the grassy ridge at a time when Jimbour suffered from a dingo problem.

The stone wall may also have served a supplementary purpose of keeping wallabies away from the plains adjacent to the head station where blue grass and wild oats grew. In the late 19th century wallabies were a persistent problem for land owners on the Darling Downs, who were forced to erect fences in an effort to control their movements. An 1874 Brisbane Courier report on Darling Downs selections around Jandowae noted "thousands of wallabies" had become pests in the region and that fences were being constructed "for the sole purpose of shutting in these little grass devourers" . At Jimbour, wallabies were no less of a problem. In 1882 the Land Commissioner for the Darling Downs reported to the Lands Department that portions of Jimbour were "rendered almost useless by reason of being overrun with wallaby".

With the repurchase of Jimbour in the early 20th century and subsequent 1909 subdivision of land either side of the Jimbour Ridge for closer agricultural settlement, the dry stone wall was used as the approximate demarcation line for subdivisions north and south of the wall. The 1909 surveys cross and re-cross the wall many times, but the survey lines mostly follow within a few metres of the stone wall. Despite sections of the wall being today in a state of collapse where wallabies have created trails over the wall, other sections remain in a relatively well-preserved state and stand as a testimony to the skills and tenacity of early pastoral workers in Queensland.

== Description ==
The Jimbour Dry Stone Wall is located on the Jimbour Ridge, a low, open, grassy but stony ridge to the north of Jimbour House and is constructed of scattered volcanic rocks taken from this ridge. Its construction type is a random double wall, being two outer skins (walls) of irregularly shaped stones, not laid in courses, which taper inwards. The space between has been filled with smaller stone rubble.

The wall extends an approximate length of 6.5 kilometres (4.0 mi). Some sections remain in an original state and stand to an approximate height of 1.5 metres (4 ft 11 in). Other sections have collapsed to the foundation stones and the first layers of building stones and stand to a height between 50 and 70 centimetres (20 and 28 in).

In these deteriorated sections of the wall sapling posts or (in a small section) steel posts have been inserted to support wire mesh and barbed wire. These posts appear to have been inserted by removing the outer facing stones of one side of the wall, placing the posts in position, then replacing the outer stones to secure the posts.

== Heritage listing ==
Jimbour Dry Stone Wall was listed on the Queensland Heritage Register on 31 May 2005 having satisfied the following criteria.

The place is important in demonstrating the evolution or pattern of Queensland's history.

The dry stone wall at Jimbour was most likely constructed in the 1870s as a barrier fence, at a period when Jimbour Station was one of Queensland's largest pastoral enterprises. It is important in demonstrating the evolution or pattern of Queensland's history insofar as it provides evidence of traditional European technology used by early settlers in controlling, shaping and adapting to the Queensland landscape.

The place demonstrates rare, uncommon or endangered aspects of Queensland's cultural heritage.

Dry stone walls of this size and extent are scarce in Queensland. They provide a relatively well-preserved example Queensland's cultural heritage.

The place is important in demonstrating the principal characteristics of a particular class of cultural places.

It stands as a testimony to the tenacity and skills of early pastoral workers and is important in demonstrating the principal characteristics of a traditional form of wall construction, dry stone walling, transplanted to Queensland in the 19th century.
