= Jimbour East, Queensland =

Jimbour East
- Suburb
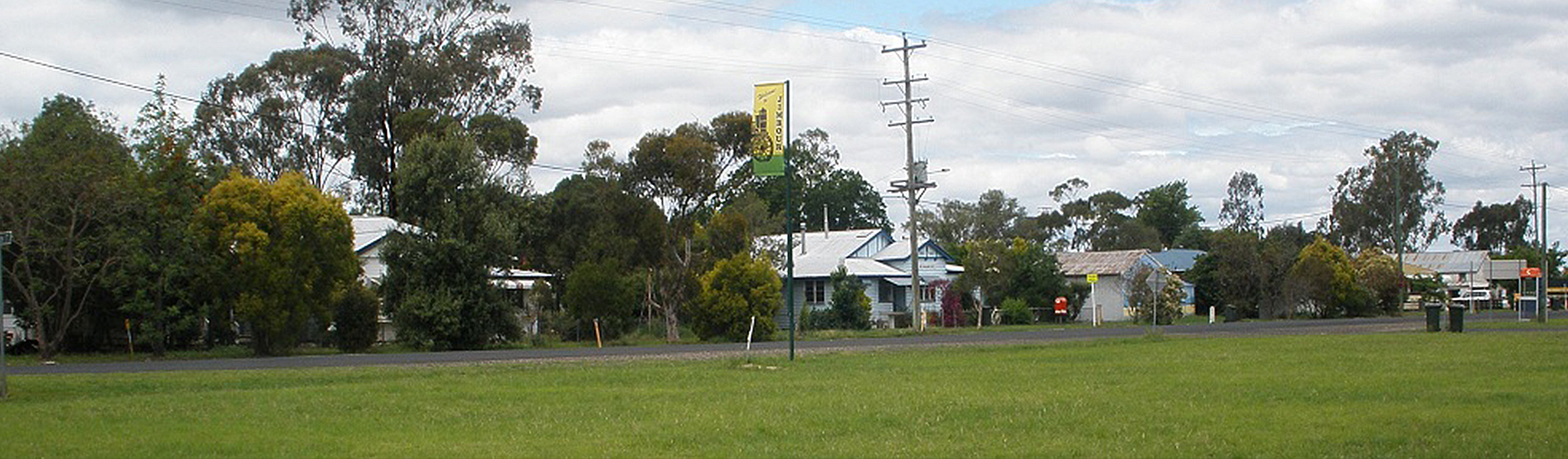
- Main street in Jimbour, 2025

- Interactive map of Jimbour East
- Coordinates: 26.9291°S 151.2891°E
- Country: Australia
- State: Queensland
- LGA: Western Downs Region
- Location: 41.4 km (25.7 mi) NNE of Dalby; 120 km (75 mi) NW of Toowoomba; 249 km (155 mi) WNW of Brisbane

Government
  - State electorate: Callide
  - Federal division: Maranoa

Area
  - Total: 290.2 km^{2} (112.0 sq mi)

Population
  - Total: 197 (2021 census)
  - Density: 0.6788/km^{2} (1.758/sq mi)
- Time zone: UTC+10:00 (AEST)
- Postcode: 4406
Suburbs around Jimbour East
Jimbour West	Cooranga	Cooranga
Jimbour West	Jimbour East	Bell
Macalister	Pirrinuan	Kaimkillenbun

Jimbour East is a rural locality in the Western Downs Region, Queensland, Australia. The town of Jimbour in the locality. In the 2021 census, Jimbour East had a population of 197 people.

== Geography ==
Jimbour East is relatively flat farming land (elevation 350–450 metres). The town of Jimbour is located in the south-western part of the locality, 236 kilometres (147 mi) west of the state capital, Brisbane.

Cooranga Creek forms most of the northern boundary of the locality.

The Dalby–Jandowae Road (State Route 82) runs along the western boundary and passes through part of the western portion.

Outside of the town, the land use is a mixture of crop growing and grazing on native vegetation.

== History ==
The town name was first used by 1841 by Henry Dennis for his Jimbour pastoral run, with the apparent meaning of either "sheep" or "good grass" in an unrecorded Aboriginal language. In 1877, 40,000 acres (16,000 ha) of land was resumed from the Jimbour pastoral run to establish smaller farms. The land was offered for selection on 24 April 1877.

Jimbour Provisional School opened on 9 September 1873. On 14 November 1916, it became Jimbour State School. During 1922 and 1923 it became a half-time school (meaning a single teacher was shared between two schools) in conjunction with Spring Flat State School initially and then with Springfield Provisional School. It resumed as a full time school in 1923 but then closed on 31 December 1925. It reopened on 29 September 1931 as Jimbour Provisional School. On 2 June 1933, it returned to state school status.

Jimbour Post Office opened on 1 September 1882.

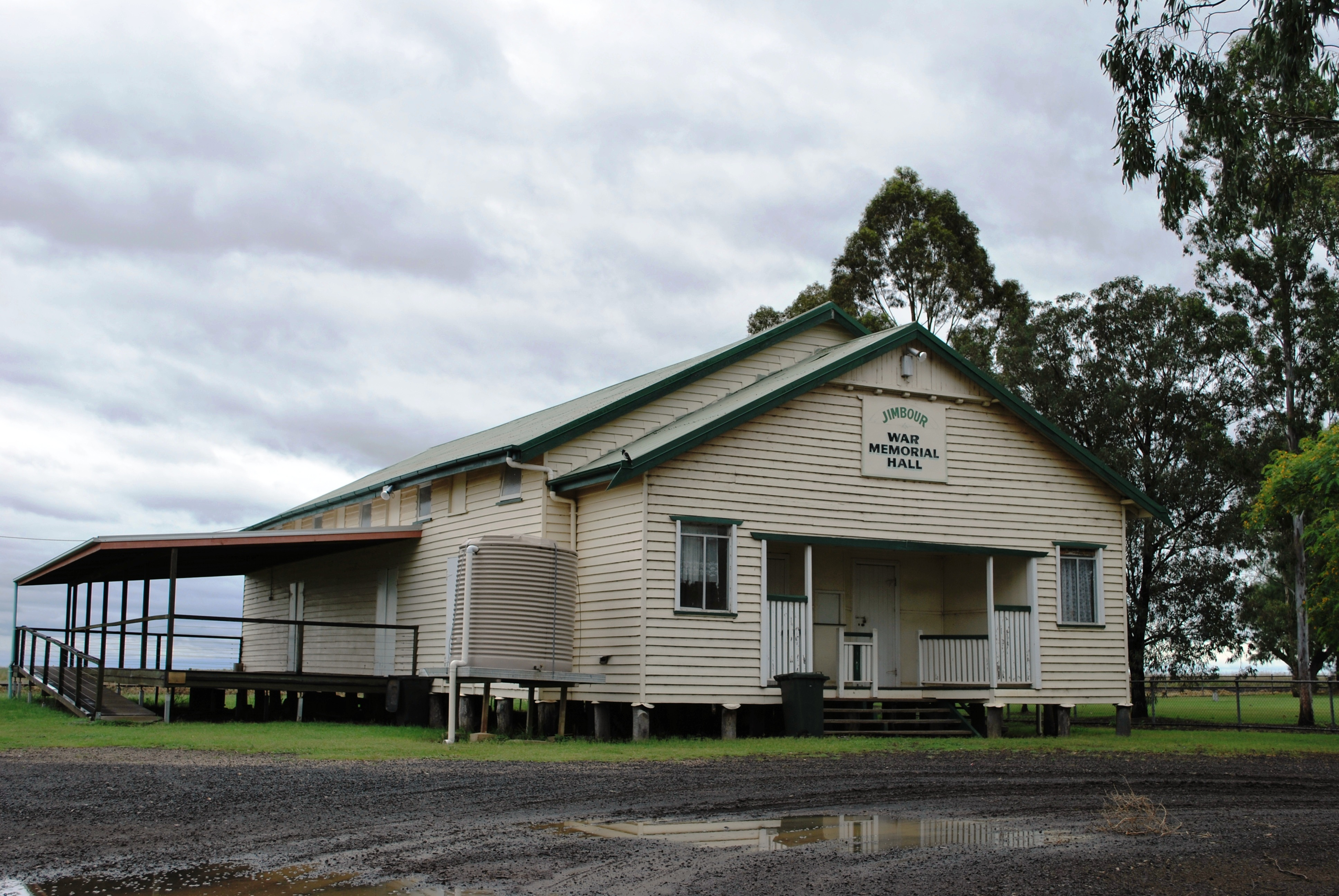
Jimbour Memorial Hall, 2008

Spring Flat Provisional School opened on 20 March 1893. On 1 January 1909, it became Spring Flat State School. It sometimes operated as a half-time school (meaning a single teacher shared between two schools in conjunction with Maida Hill State School and Jimbour State School. It closed in 1925. It reopened in 1926, but closed permanently on 1 April 1929. It was on the western side of Spring Flat Road (approx 26.89039°S 151.36092°E).

Bunjinie State School, located nearby towards Cooranga, operated from 16 May 1949 to 1958. It originally opened as Bunginie State School, with the minor spelling change happening during the first year.

The Jimbour Memorial Hall is the second such building on that site, the first having blown down in a severe storm in 1949.

== Demographics ==
In the 2006 census, the locality of Jimbour East had a population of 185 people.

In the 2016 census, the locality of Jimbour East had a population of 199 people.

In the 2021 census, the locality of Jimbour East had a population of 197 people.

== Heritage listings ==
Jimbour East has a number of heritage-listed sites, including:

- Jimbour Dry Stone Wall, Dalby–Jandowae Road
- Jimbour Homestead, 86–371 Jimbour–Malakoff Road

== Education ==
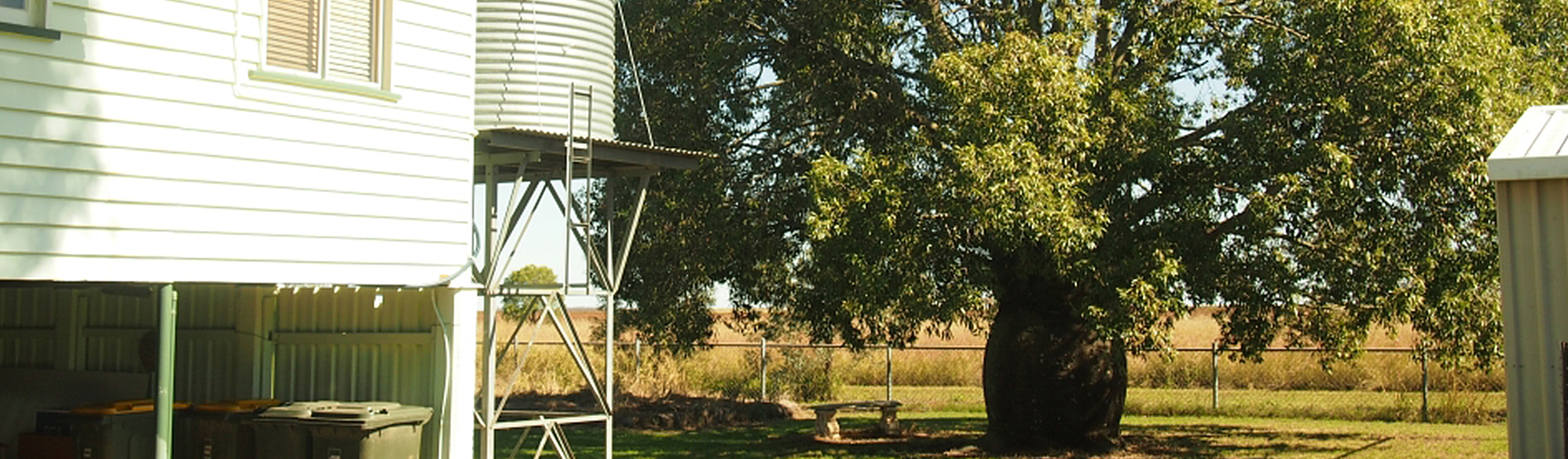
Jimbour State School, 2025

Jimbour State School is a government primary (Prep–6) school for boys and girls at 2421 Dalby–Jandowae Road (26.9630°S 151.2163°E). In 2018, the school had an enrolment of 13 students with 2 teachers (1 full-time equivalent) and 4 non-teaching staff (2 full-time equivalent).

There are no secondary schools in Jimbour East. The nearest government secondary schools are Bell State School (to Year 10) in neighbouring Bell to the east, Jandowae State School (to Year 10) in Jandowae to the north-west, and Dalby State High School (to Year 12) in Dalby to the south.

== Amenities ==
Facilities in the town include a primary school, a post office, butchery (that is non operational) and a town hall.
