= Macalister, Queensland =

Macalister
- Town
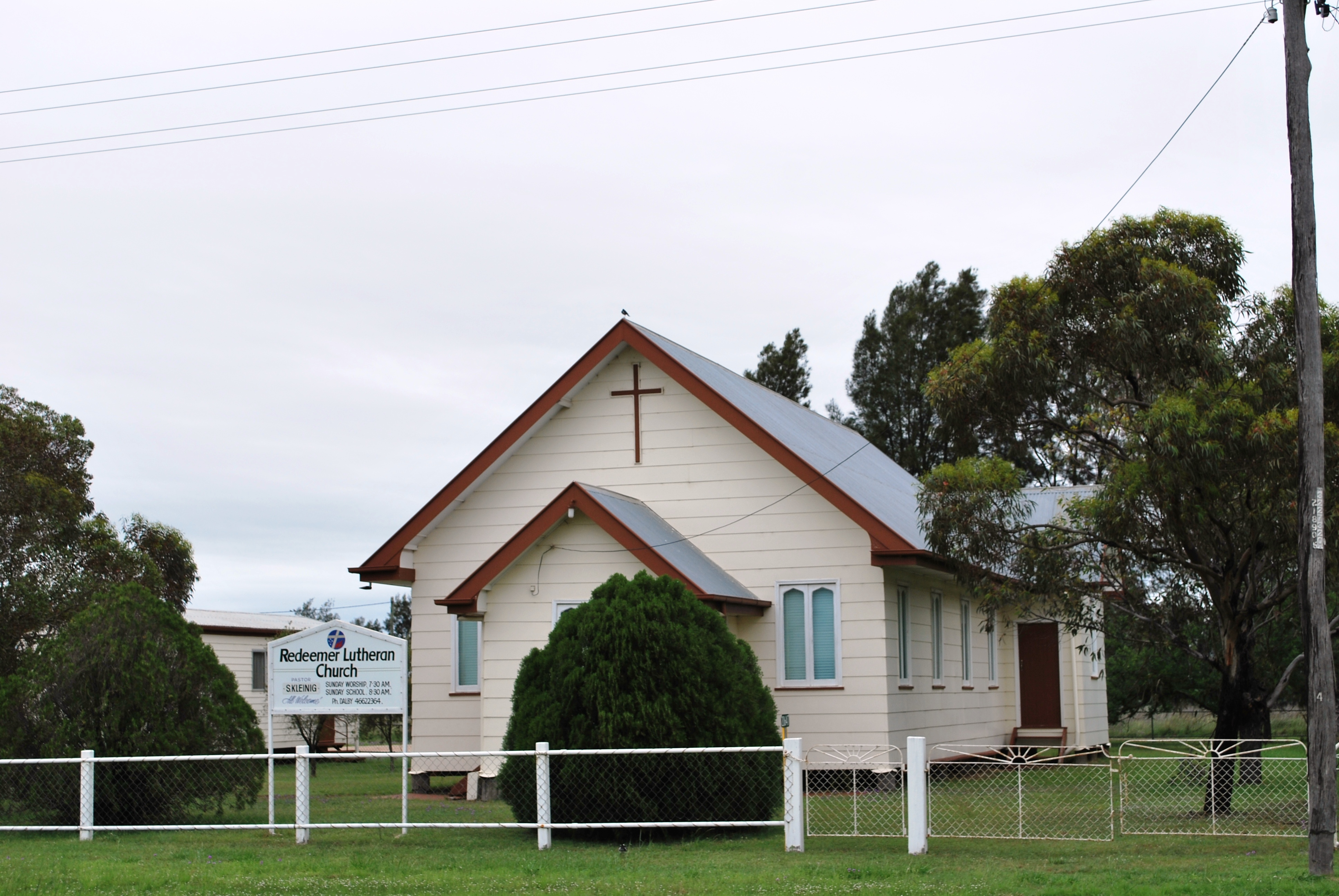
- Reedeemer Lutheran Church

- Interactive map of Macalister
- Coordinates: 27.0436°S 151.0772°E
- Country: Australia
- State: Queensland
- LGA: Western Downs Region
- Location: 34.5 km (21.4 mi) NNW of Dalby; 115 km (71 mi) NW of Toowoomba; 243 km (151 mi) WNW of Brisbane

Government
  - State electorate: Warrego
  - Federal division: Maranoa

Area
  - Total: 327.3 km^{2} (126.4 sq mi)

Population
  - Total: 156 (2021 census)
  - Density: 0.4766/km^{2} (1.234/sq mi)
- Time zone: UTC+10:00 (AEST)
- Postcode: 4406
Localities around Macalister
Warra	Jimbour West	Jimbour East
Kogan	Macalister	Pirrinuan
Kogan	Ranges Bridge	Dalby

Macalister is a rural town and locality in the Western Downs Region, Queensland, Australia. In the 2021 census, the locality of Macalister had a population of 156 people.

== Geography ==
The locality is located in the Darling Downs and the town is in centre of the locality.

The Warrego Highway enters the locality from the south-east (Dalby), passes through the town, and exits to the north-west (Warra).

The Western railway line runs immediately parallel and north of the highway, with three railway stations in the locality (from west to east):

- Broadmead railway station (now abandoned) in the north-west of the locality (26.9969°S 151.0258°E)
- Macalister railway station, serving the town (27.0446°S 151.0793°E)
- Apunyal railway station (now abandoned) in the south-east of the locality (27.0696°S 151.1089°E)

There are two neighbourhoods in Macalister arising from these railway stations:

- Broadmead in the north-west of the locality (27.0000°S 151.0333°E)
- Apunyal in the south-east of the locality (27.0666°S 151.1°E)

== History ==
The town is named after Arthur Macalister, Premier of Queensland from 1866 to 1867.

The name Apunyal is an Aboriginal word meaning large plain.

Macalister Post Office opened on 1 July 1880 (a receiving office had been open from 1876, known as Jimbour Creek until 1878) and closed in 1980.

Ranges Bridge Provisional School opened circa 1886 and closed in June 1894. The school building was then relocated and reopened as Macalister Provisional School on 27 August 1894. On 1 January 1909, it became Macalister State School. In 1913, it was renamed Apunyal State School. It closed circa 1935. It was on the western corner of the junction of the Warrego Highway and Pirrinuan Apunyal Road (approx 27.07019°S 151.10762°E).

A second separate Macalister State School opened in 1913 (the first one having been renamed Apunyal). It closed on 4 May 1973. The school was on the Warrego Highway (27.0462°S 151.0790°E).

== Demographics ==
In the 2006 census, the locality of Macalister and the surrounding area had a population of 486 people.

In the 2016 census, the locality of Macalister had a population of 153 people.

In the 2021 census, the locality of Macalister had a population of 156 people.

== Education ==
There are no schools in Macalister. The nearest government primary schools are Jimbour State School in neighbouring Jimbour East to the north-east, Warra State School in neighbouring Warra to the north-west, Dalby State School in neighbouring Dalby to the south-east and Kogan State School in neighbouring Kogan to the west. The nearest government secondary schools are Jandowae State School (to Year 10) in Jandowae to the north and Dalby State High School (to Year 12) in Dalby.

== Amenities ==
The Redeemer Lutheran Church is at 20647 Warrego Highway (27.0443°S 151.0776°E).

The Macalister branch of the Queensland Country Women's Association meets at the Kenmore Library at the QCWA Hall at 20649 Warrego Highway (27.04412°S 151.0775°E).
