= Jandowae railway line =

Former railway line in Queensland

The Jandowae Branch Railway was a 46 kilometres (29 mi) railway line from Dalby to Jandowae in the Darling Downs region of Queensland, Australia.

== History ==
The Darling Downs is a very fertile agricultural area in South East Queensland, and was the destination of the first railway built by the State government to facilitate transport and encourage development and immigration. The main line arrived in 1868, and was extended west commencing a decade later.

Despite being a productive valley, with Jimbour House being one of the earliest settled areas in the region, a railway was not approved until December 1911, the line opening on 13 August 1914.

Initially the junction was situated at Mahar, about 3 kilometres west of Dalby, but a parallel line was built to Dalby within a few years to save on the cost of staffing the junction.

The line was undulating, with a maximum grade on 1 in 73 (~1.37%) in the northwest bound direction, and 1 in 83 (~1.2%) in the southeast direction, with curves of a minimum 500m radius and only 1 substantial bridge on the line.

A mixed train initially plied the route three times a week taking some 2¾ hours to complete the one-way journey. A rail motor service ran three days a week from 1928 to 1941. The line catered in the main for the transport of dairy products along with bagged and bulk grain.

The line was upgraded in the 1990s to enable grain traffic to be handled by main line locomotives. It had 30 kg/m rails, a 15.75 tonne axle load and a line speed of 30 km/h.

The line closed on 26 June 2013.

== Route ==
Stations on the route included (from north to south):

- Jandowae railway station (26.7828°S 151.1087°E)
- Marnhull railway station (26.8429°S 151.1610°E)
- Cresley railway station (26.8748°S 151.1780°E)
- Kuyura railway station (26.9031°S 151.1899°E)
- Baigin railway station (26.94401°S 151.20722°E)
- Pirrinuan railway station (27.0331°S 151.2355°E)
- Karingal railway station (27.07889°S 151.23861°E)
