= Jimbour Homestead =

Heritage-listed homestead in Queensland, Australia

Jimbour
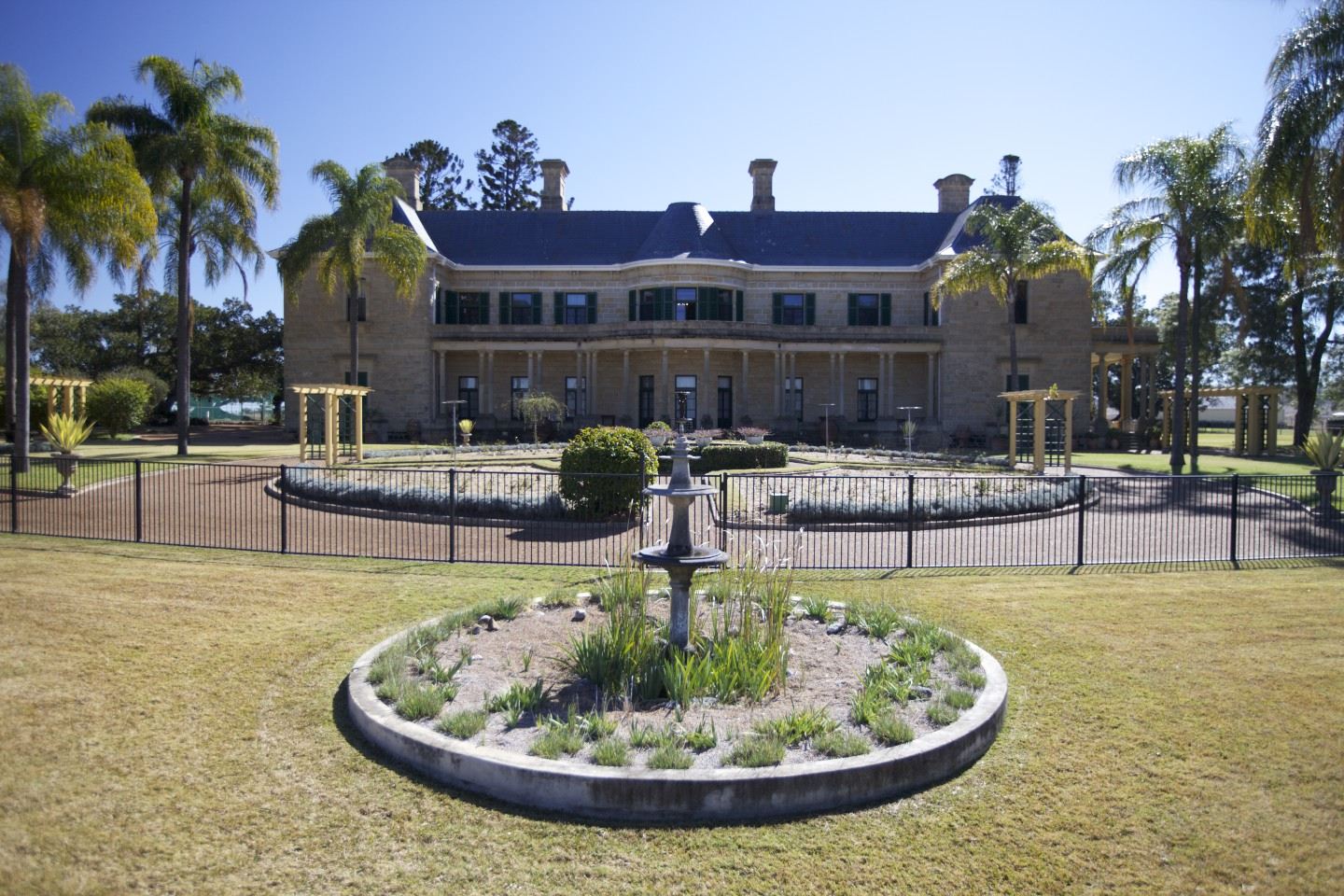
- North facing view of Jimbour

General information
- Type: Residential
- Architectural style: French colonial
- Location: Darling Downs, 86 Jimbour Station Road, Jimbour
- Coordinates: 26.96120°S 151.23527°E
- Completed: 1877
- Renovated: 1923–1925
- Cost: £30,000 (1877)
- Owner: Russell Pastoral Company

Technical details
- Structural system: Sandstone
- Floor count: 2
- Floor area: 2,136 m²

Design and construction
- Architects: Richard George Suter and Annesley Wesley Voysey
- Main contractor: Joshua Peter Bell

Jimbour is a heritage-listed homestead on one of the earliest stations established on the Darling Downs, Queensland, Australia, It is important in demonstrating the pattern of early European exploration and pastoral settlement in Queensland, Australia. The building is associated with the development of the Darling Downs and of the pastoral industry in Queensland and is important in demonstrating the wealth and ambition of early Queensland pastoralists.

Jimbour House was an ambitious structure in terms of size, style and finish and was intended to support the social and political aspirations of Joshua Peter Bell, an important politician and businessman as well as grazier. It is unique in Queensland as the only genuinely grand country house in the English manner to be built in the state. Other substantial stone homesteads of the era, such as Talgai, Glengallan and Westbrook, came nowhere near to rivalling Jimbour in either size or opulence.

== History ==
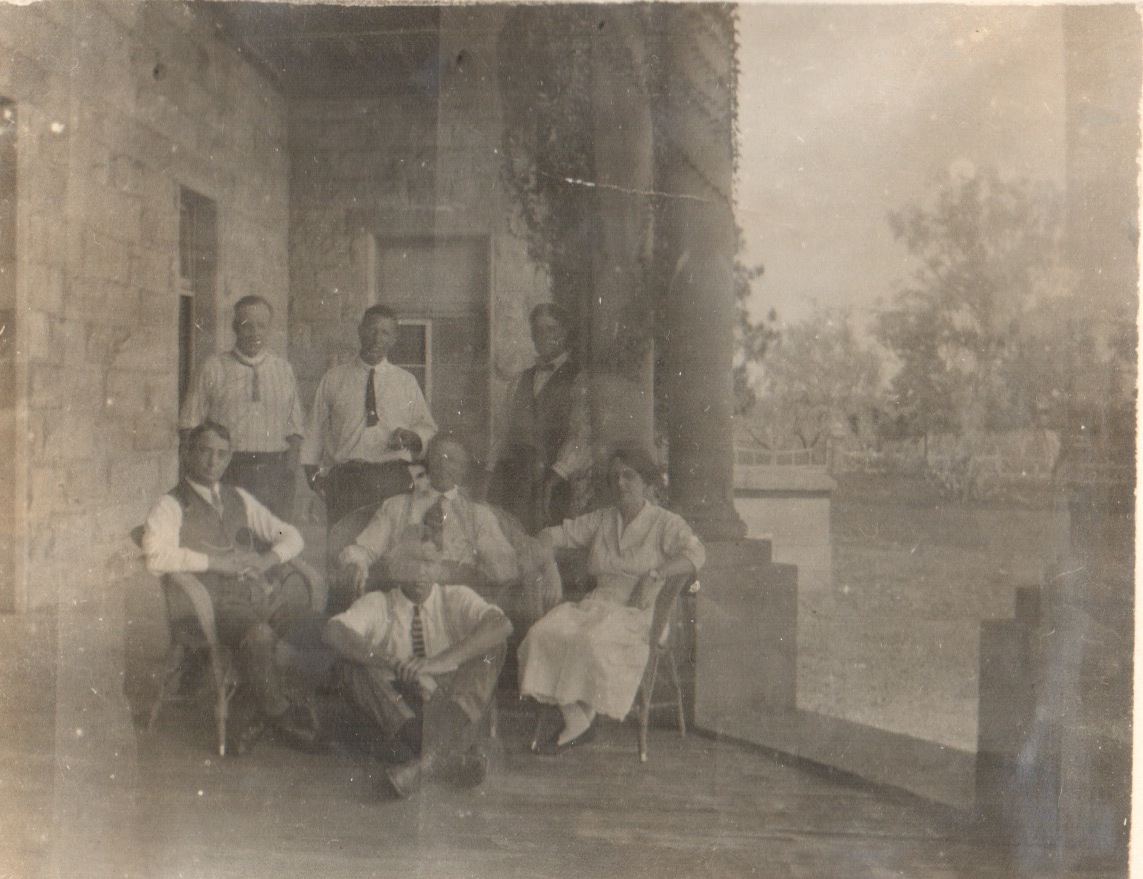
Settlement of purchase by WA Russell, 1923

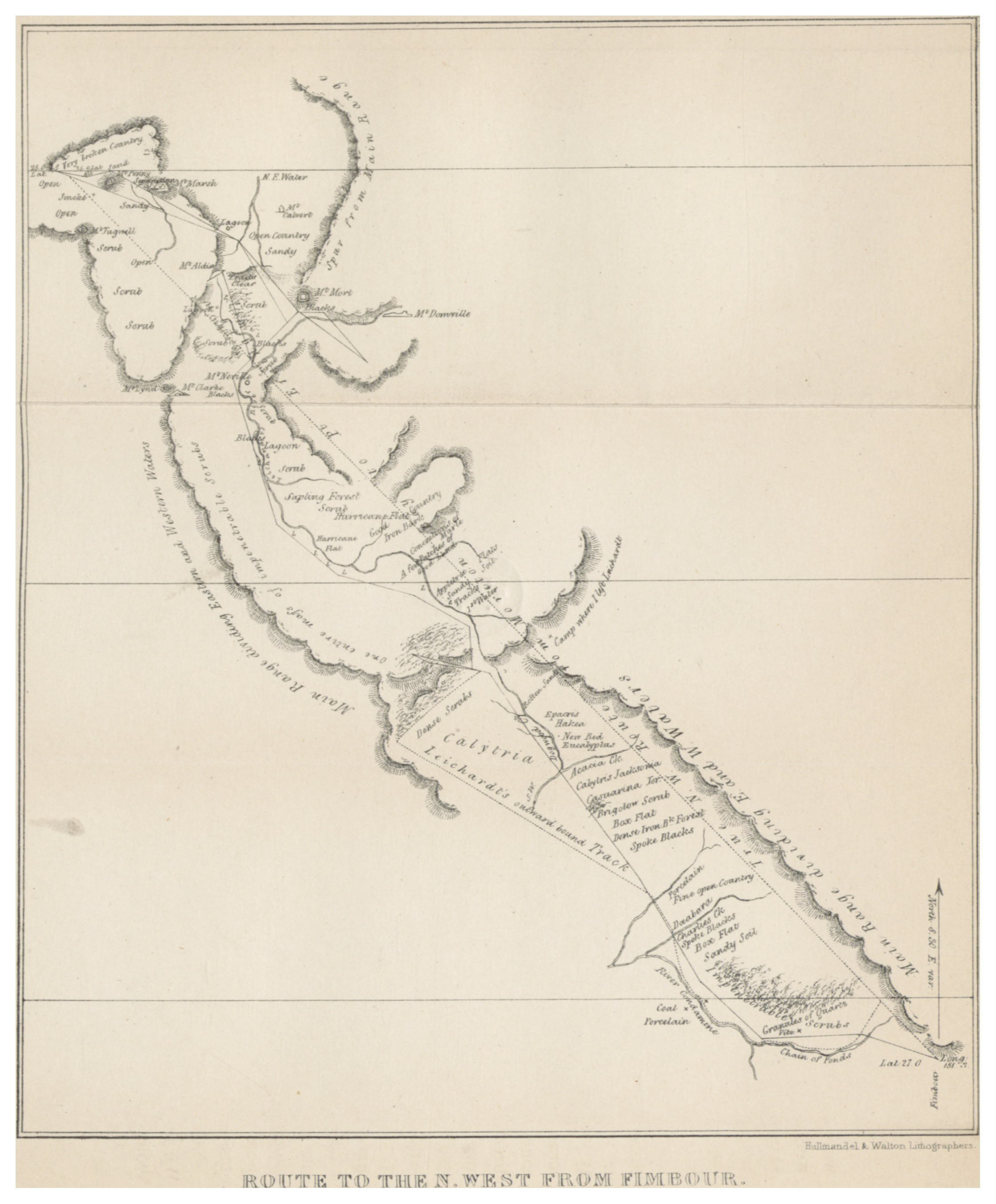
Map of Leichard's exploration route 1844

The property was first claimed by Henry Dennis on behalf of a Scotsman called Richard Todd Scougall in 1842. Scougall established a run with sheep and cattle which were driven north from the Hunter Valley. Scougall experienced disease outbreaks and bankruptcy stemming from the collapse of the Bank of Australasia. The property was purchased by Thomas Bell for £3,200 in 1844. Bell was from Ireland and had moved to Australia with his family in 1829.

In 1844, explorer Ludwig Leichhardt stayed at Jimbour, at that time the most northerly station on the Downs, preparing for his trip to Port Essington. In 1864, utilising their pre-emptive purchase rights, Thomas Bell, Joshua Peter Bell and John Alexander Bell acquired title to 4,786 acres (1,937 ha) (pre-emptive portion 1) of the Jimbour holding as tenants in common. This pre-emptive purchase included the head station site. Following Thomas Bell's death in September 1872, the Jimbour freehold was transmitted to Joshua Peter Bell, John Alexander Bell and a third brother, Marmaduke Bell, as tenants in common. The original house built by Scougall was burned down in 1867.

In about 1873 fashionable Brisbane architects Richard Suter and Annesley Wesley Voysey, in partnership from January 1872 to September 1874, were commissioned to design a new sandstone house, handsome and ambitious in scale and quality, as the main residence at Jimbour. Work on Jimbour House commenced in late 1874, and was completed by early 1877. Slate for the roof was imported from Wales. Gas and water were built into the house. Gas was generated from a coal mine on the property and water via a water tower was pumped by a windmill, the first structure known to be erected in Queensland.

Jerry Jerome, an Aboriginal descent from the local Yiman people, was born on 24 May 1874 at Jimbour homestead to Wollon Charlie [father], an Aboriginal labourer, and his wife Guli. Jerry was a local renown horseman, athlete and show boxer, who became an Australian boxing legend. Jerry Jerome, fought 58 boxing battles, 35 were wins and 23 were losses. In 1915 at the age of 41 Jerry resigned from boxing and died penniless in Cherbourg mission in 1943.

In 1877, 40,000 acres (16,000 ha) of land was resumed from the Jimbour pastoral run to establish smaller farms. The land was offered for selection on 24 April 1877.

In 1881, a shortage of working capital led the Bell brothers to merge their financial interests in Jimbour with those of Premier Thomas McIlwraith and JC Smyth, forming The Darling Downs and Western Land Company. In October 1881, most of the Jimbour freehold was transferred to the company, but an area of 100 acres (40 ha) (sub 1 of pre-emptive portion 1), containing the house and most of the outbuildings, was retained by the Bell brothers as tenants in common.

Under Joshua Bell's stewardship the property became known as 'The Mecca of Civilization on the Darling Downs'. Joshua Peter Bell died suddenly in December 1881 and his family commissioned a memorial obelisk that was placed to the west of the main house, near the water tower and church. At this time JP Bell's interest in Jimbour House was transferred to his wife (Lady) Margaret Miller Bell, Sir Arthur Hunter Palmer and Boyd Dunlop Morehead as Trustees.

Jimbour House continued as the principal residence of Lady Bell and her eldest son, barrister Joshua Thomas Bell, following their return to Queensland in 1889. JT Bell became a director of the Darling Downs and Western Land Company, and served as private secretary to Premier Sir Samuel Griffith from 1890 to 1892 before being elected to the Queensland Legislative Assembly in which he served as a Minister and subsequently Speaker. Following the collapse of the Company in the early 1890s the Bell family assigned their interest in the Jimbour freehold to the Queensland National Bank, on the condition that the family was allowed to occupy Jimbour House, which they did until c1912.

=== 20th century ===
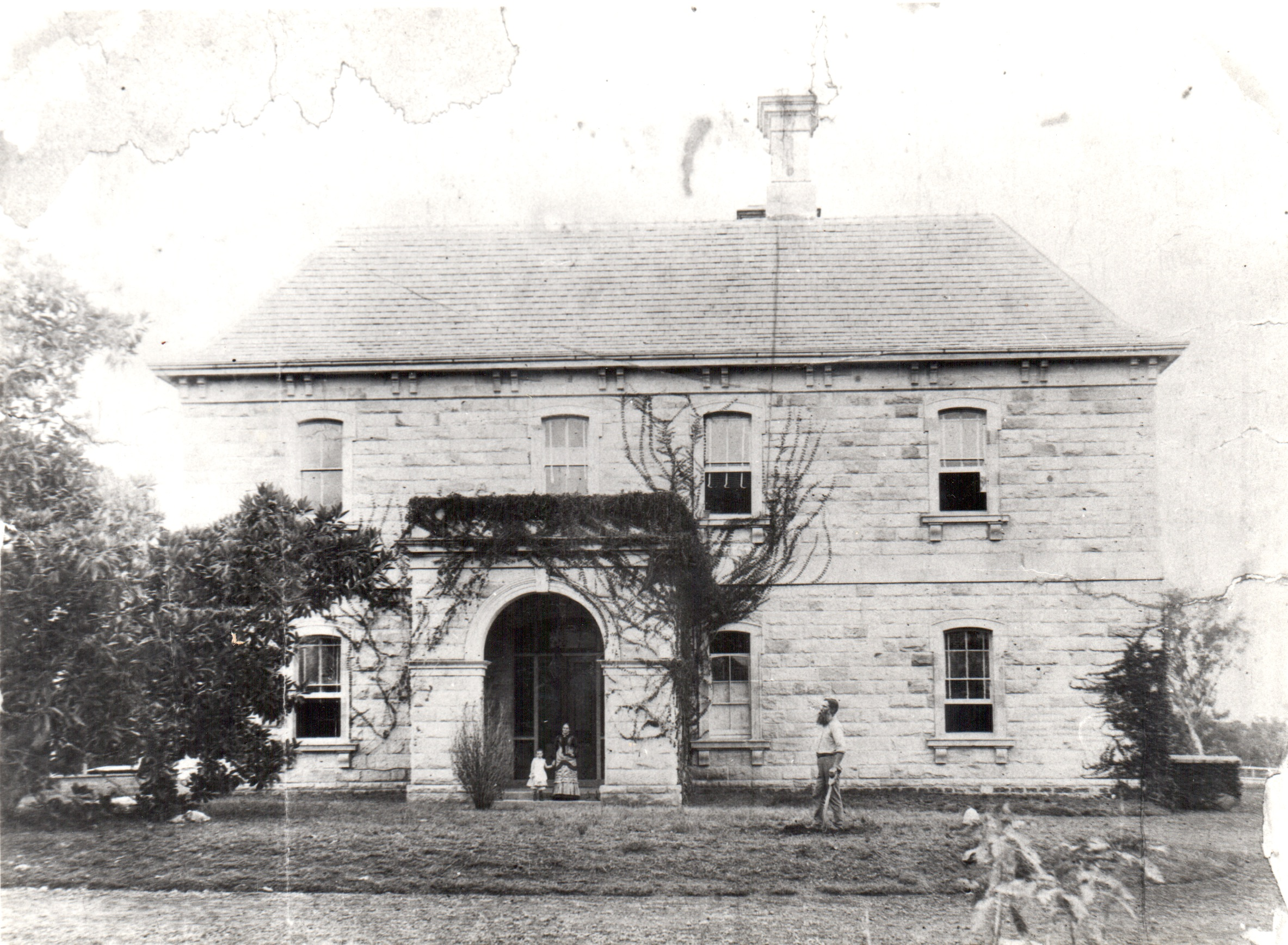
Jimbour in the 1880s. West façade

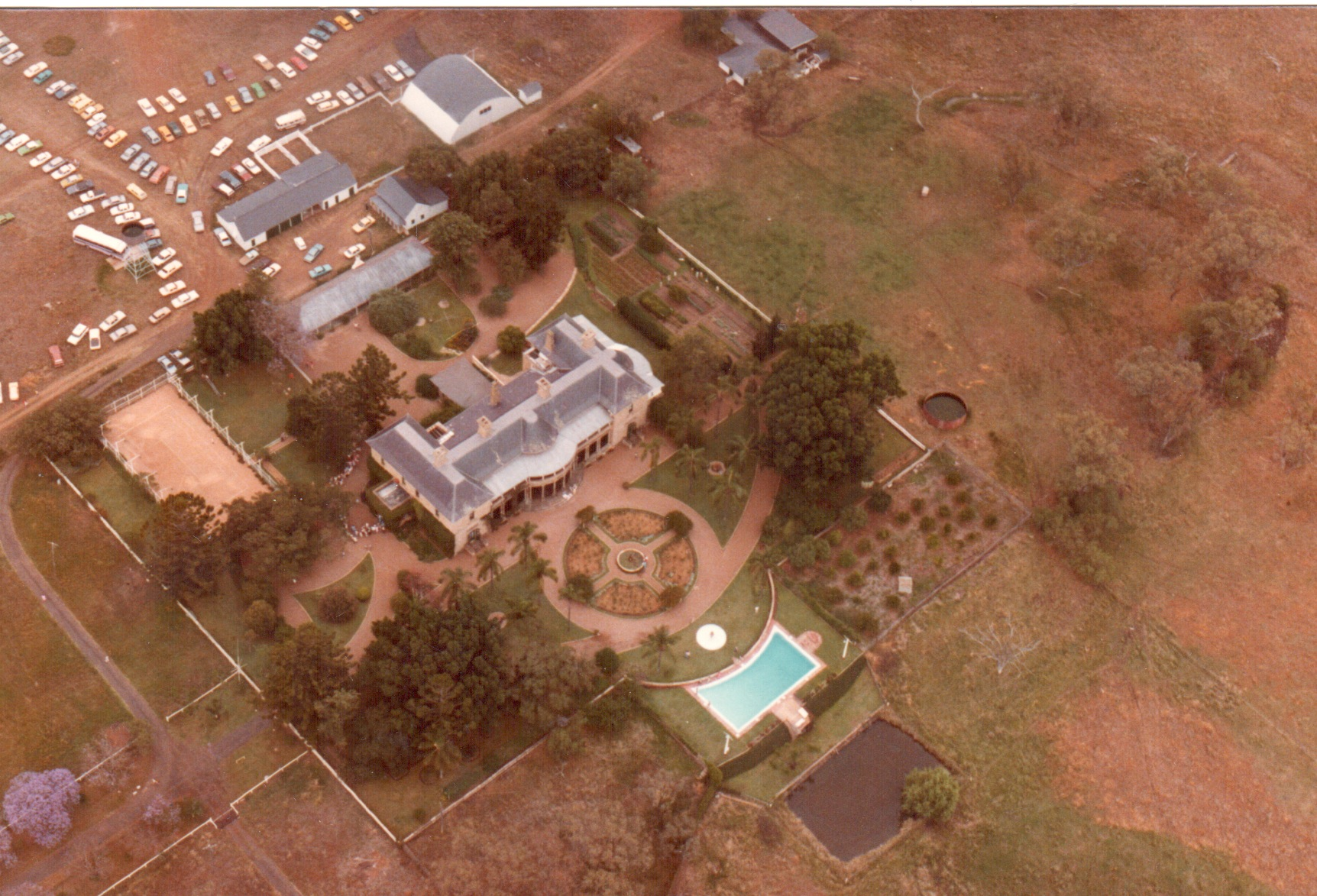
Aerial photograph of Jimbour in the 1970s

In 1906, the Closer Settlement Act was passed through the Parliament of Queensland. Steps were taken to compulsorily acquire Jimbour. By 1910, just 100 acres (40 ha) remained. Following the death of JT Bell in 1911, the contents of Jimbour House were auctioned in July 1912 and Lady Bell retired to Brisbane. Through the remainder of the decade the house was occupied by Messrs Thomas and Ryder of Jimbour Station, although they did not acquire title to the house site. In the early 1920s the house on its 100 acres (40 ha) was sold by order of the mortgagee, the Queensland National Bank, with title transferred in October 1922 to Charles Wippell.

The association of the Russell family with Jimbour House commenced in the 1923 when Roma pastoralist Wilfred Adams Russell purchased the property from Wippell. Title was transferred to Russell in January 1925. Russell was born in Queensland in 1874 and educated in New South Wales, where he later acquired pastoral and agricultural interests. In 1909, he acquired an interest in Dalmally Station near Roma and took up residence there in 1910. He further extended his pastoral interests with the acquisition of properties at Cunnamulla and Jimbour Station.

At the time of Russell's purchase, Jimbour House was derelict, with several of the ceilings collapsed and only parts of the building habitable, and the gardens were a wilderness. From 1924 to 1925 Russell commenced a major programme of restoration and repair. Ceilings were replaced; a new kitchen was added behind the house, incorporating part of the former covered way between the 1870s house and the 1868 bluestone house; and the gardens were redesigned and extended by Brisbane landscape designer Harry Stokes. The bluestone building was badly damaged and parts of the upper floor had crumbled so it was decided to salvage the ground floor as a single storey building and use this as men's quarters. Russell and his wife strived to discover and collect the original furniture where possible.

On 21 November 1925 Jimbour House was formally re-opened with a fund-raising fete for Dalby Hospital. This commitment to work for the well-being of the community has been continued by the Russell family. Wilfred Russell died in 1932, and the management of Jimbour passed to his son Charles Russell and Charles' wife Hilary. In the 1930s, two large wooden pergolas over the drive at each end of the house and four smaller pergolas in the rose garden were erected, and the rose garden was divided into the four quadrants that now define it. In 1938, the drive was constructed from the front gate to the water tower, and jacarandas and shrubs were planted along both sides.

In the 1950s and 1960s the Russells developed agriculture (especially wheat) in conjunction with livestock at Jimbour, and new facilities were constructed such as stores, grain silos, feedlots and piggeries. Work on the early buildings and the garden also continued. In 1950, a large swimming pool and wading pool were constructed in the front grounds of Jimbour House and children from surrounding properties were welcome to visit Jimbour and use the pool during the summer months. An airstrip was established at the rear of the house in the 1950s. In 1956, the timber water tower was converted into a four-level residence for the gardener. In the 1960s, the 1864 stone store was converted into two flats with the construction of a mezzanine level and the insertion of dormer windows, and a citrus orchard was planted to the east of the swimming pool.

Charles Russell died in 1977, but Jimbour House remains the property of the Russell family. In the late 20th century a stone fruit and pomme fruit orchard was established to the west of the swimming pool and avenues of trees (planted by distinguished visitors) were commenced on the eastern and western sides of the garden. A vineyard was established on Jimbour land in the late 1990s, but this is not included within the heritage boundary. Jimbour was listed on the Queensland Heritage Register in 1992.

=== Jimbour today ===
As originally taken up, Jimbour was a huge property of some 311,000 acres (126,000 ha) and depasturing 250,000 sheep. After further divisions, subdivisions and purchases, the property of Jimbour now comprises 11,200 acres (4,500 ha) of Mountain Coolibahand and Basalt ridges. Roughly 3000 of these acres are under cultivation, used to grow cereal cash crops and winter forage crops for stock. The balance of over 8,000 acres (3,200 ha) is made up of natural and improved pastures for 700 breeding cattle and their progeny to turn off as bullocks and cull heifers. With bought-in stock, over 700 fat cattle per year are produced. The property produces around 30 commercial Charolais bulls annually.

Jimbour's vineyard was planted in 2000 and wine production commenced in 2003. However, despite the most recognised and awarded year in its history, Russell Pastoral Company announced in 2010 that due to the continuing poor financial outlook of the Australian wine industry, it would indefinitely suspend its brand Jimbour Wines.

Today Jimbour combines the attractions of "Living History", from its heritage-listed architecture and gardens, to a busy tourism destination. Events, particularly weddings are often catered for in the historic surrounds. The sights and sounds of yesteryear are preserved alongside the activities of a working property producing fine beef, stud cattle and grain crops.

== Architecture ==
=== Main House ===
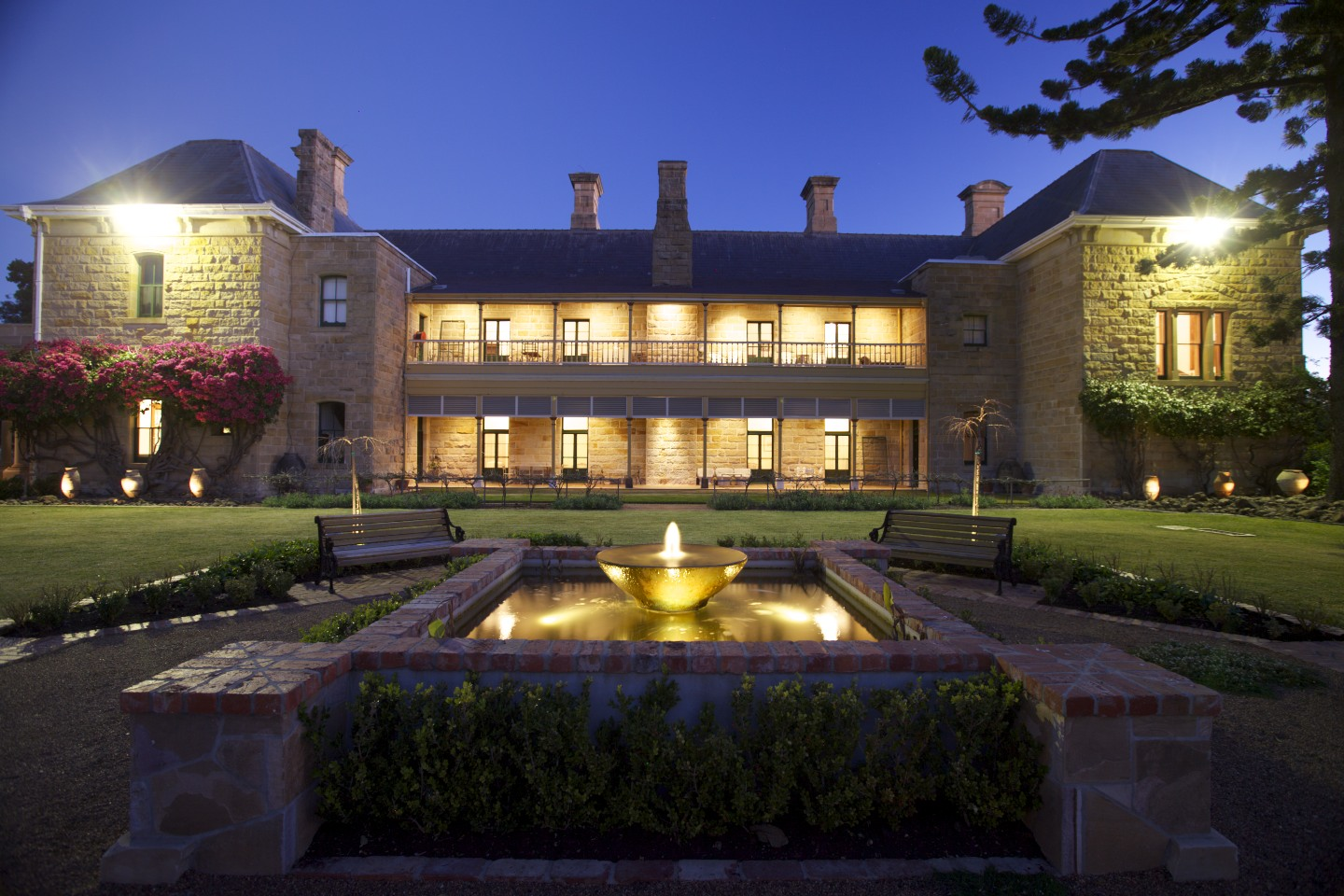
Deborah Russell garden and house at night

Jimbour House comprises three bays; two longitudinal projecting end bays with a central transverse bay, lined on the principal façade with an open terrace on the upper level supported on Doric order columns on stone plinths, paired in some places. Centrally located on the principal façade is a semi-circular projection, apparent in the roofline and through both storeys. This defines the principal entrance. The roof is steeply pitched, hipped over the three bays of the building and clad with Welsh slates. Dominating the roofline are four large brick chimneystacks with corbelled caps. Projecting from the two ends of the building are classically inspired single-storeyed wings with parapets concealing their rooflines. The terrace on the upper level of the house has been built in at the rear and there is a single-storeyed brick kitchen block below it.

The interior of the house has a wide hall running for most of its length on both levels. Both levels of the hall have a fireplace on one wall, reminiscent of the galleries in English country houses used as winter promenades. The joinery is of a high quality.

The ground floor contains receptions rooms, a billiard room and a large, square entrance hall with a bedroom opening off it. The upper floor echoes the layout of the ground floor and has an open paved terrace, bedrooms, and suites of rooms. One bedroom has two hunting scenes frescoes (drawn directly onto the plaster of the walls) dated 16/11/1879.

=== Outbuildings ===
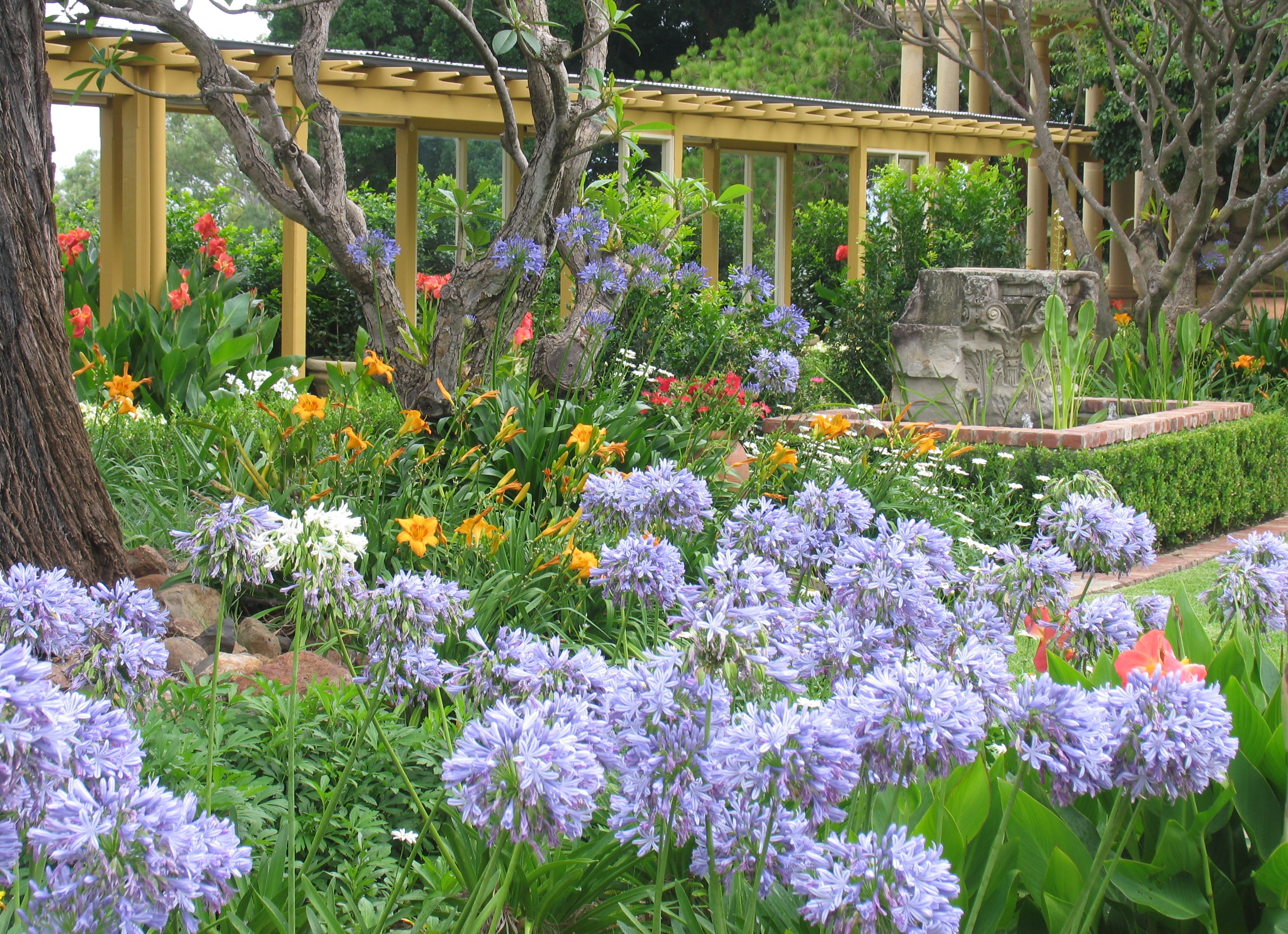
View from the Deborah Russell garden

To the west/southwest of the main house is a large, rectangular building of pecked sandstone blocks, which now accommodates residential accommodation on two levels. Originally constructed as a store, evidence remains of the massive barred windows and catshead to the upper level. The building has a gabled roof with close eaves, clad in corrugated iron, into which dormer windows have been inserted. The end walls have arched openings on the upper level, which are now glazed. One of them has a small balcony. The building has sash windows and one of the external doors has a mail hatch from the days when this building was used as a post office. Partition walls and some ceilings inside are timber. One of the rear rooms has a blue-green lime wash finish that is believed to be early.

=== Bluestone Building ===
(1868 residence, remodelled in the 1870s as a kitchen and staff quarters and in the 1920s as men's quarters) To the rear of the main house and separated from it by a garden area, is a single-storeyed, low-set bluestone building with sandstone quoins, rectangular in plan, which was formed from the lower storey of the 1868 main homestead residence. It has a hipped roof clad in corrugated iron. The wall at the eastern end of the building is of weatherboards with bricks infilling between the quoins, following the removal of an adjoining wing. The rooms are arranged in a linear fashion, each opening onto a verandah along the southern side. The interior has fibrous cement linings and battened ceilings. One room has a brick fireplace.

=== Chapel ===
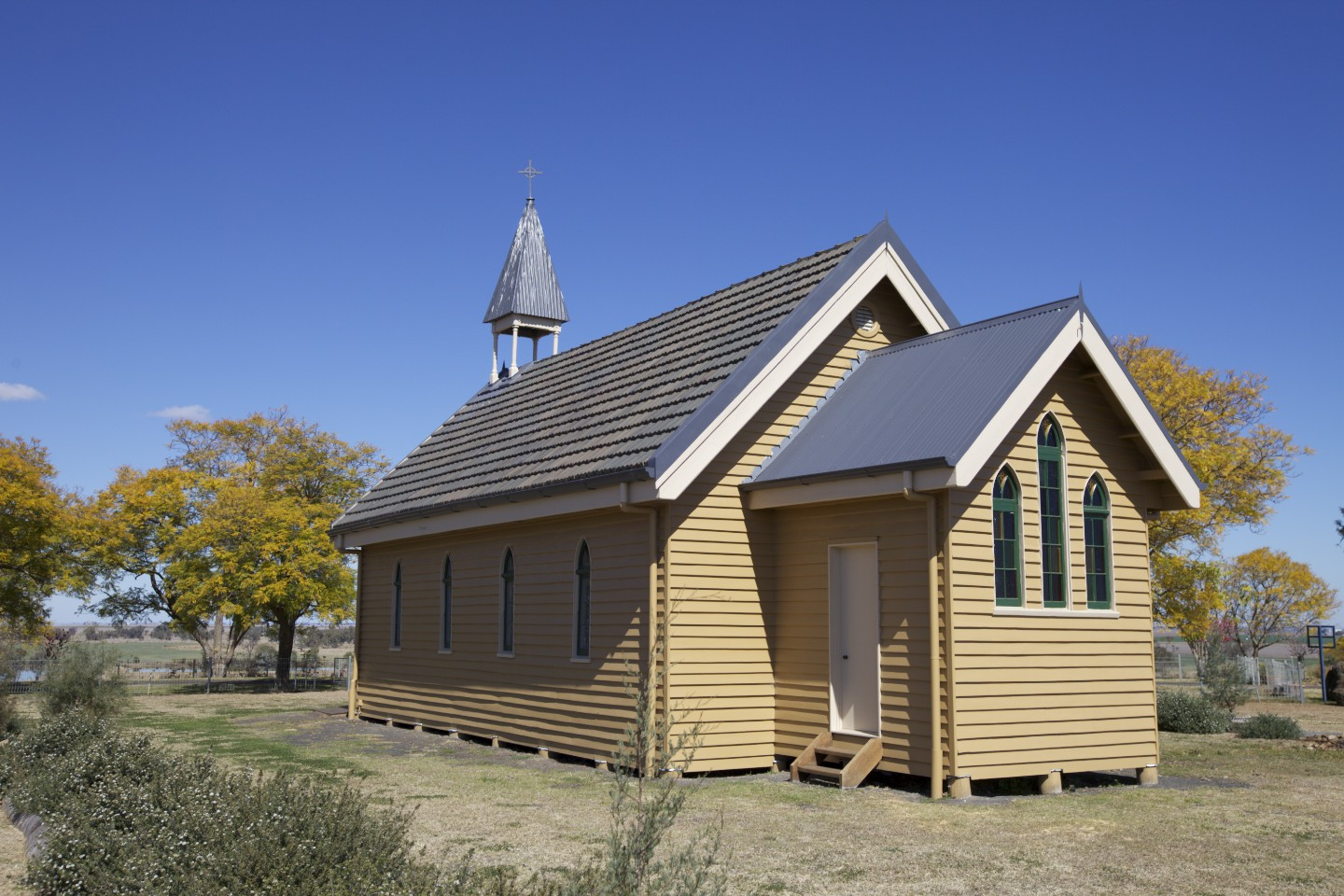
The Chapel

Finished in 1868. At some distance west from the main house and north of the main drive (26.96084°S 151.23272°E) is a simple timber chapel set on low stumps. It is rectangular in plan with the sanctuary under a separate roof at one end and a porch at the other. The main roof is clad with late 20th century tiles and has a small belfry. The roofs of the belfry, sanctuary and porch are clad in corrugated iron. The porch roof was for a period raised to accommodate a small film projection room above the door, illustrating the multi-functioned use of this building which for a time housed the Jimbour school. Inside, the main roof is supported on scissor trusses and is ceiled with timber. The nave is lined with composite board and is lit by small lancet windows with coloured glass. There are carved altar rails and font and timber pews.

=== Water Tower ===
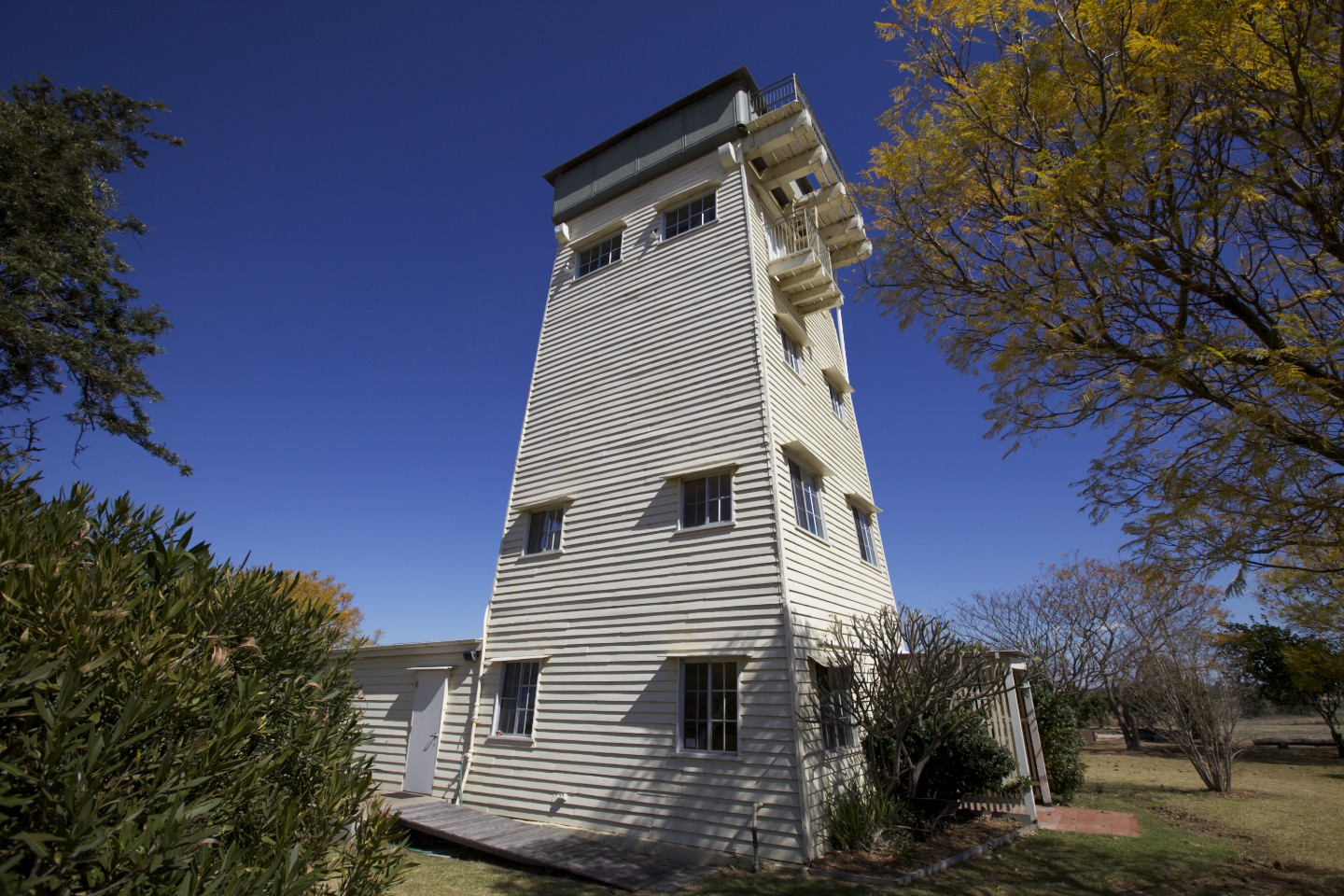
The Water Tower

(1870s, converted 1950s into residential use)

West of the chapel and the main drive is a tall timber tower (26.96087°S 151.23223°E), 4 storeys in height and square in section, with walls sloping inwards, supporting a large, square, cast iron water tank. The framing is of trimmed tree trunks and hand hewn timber, clad externally with weatherboards dating to the 1870s. The interior now accommodates residential use and is lined with fibrous-cement sheeting and timber cover strips. The ground floor has modern metal-framed sliding doors and windows and contains a visitors' centre and gift shop. The top storey room is decorated with several naïve paintings, executed between 1924 and 1956 by a former employee at Jimbour. From this level, there is external access via a timber ladder to the water tank above. A single storey timber extension has been added to one side.

=== Bell Memorial ===
The Bell Memorial is located to the south of the water tower. Metal railings surround the memorial, which comprises a painted masonry obelisk decorated very simply with a border of acanthus below the plinth on which the shaft rests. The memorial below this is square in section with a plaque to each face, two of which are inscribed in memory of Sir Joshua Peter Bell who died in 1881 and of his son Joshua Thomas Bell who died in 1911. A third plaque was inscribed in memory of Lady Bell in 2002. The other face is blank.

=== Stone Store ===
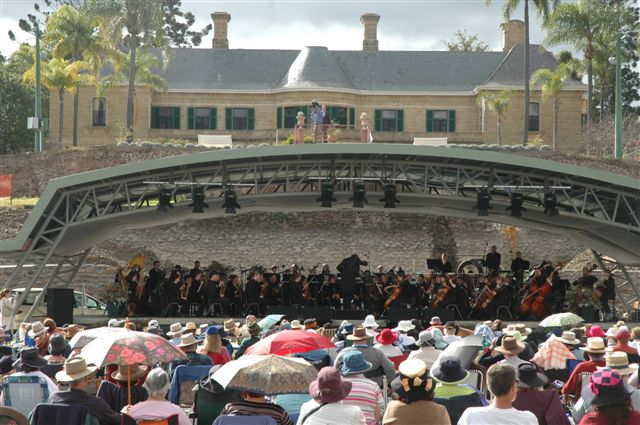
Queensland Music Festival 2005

To the west/southwest of the main house is a large, rectangular building of pecked sandstone blocks, which now accommodates residential accommodation on two levels. Originally designed by notable Queensland architect Benjamin Backhouse and constructed as a store, evidence remains of the massive barred windows and catshead to the upper level. The building has a gabled roof with close eaves, clad in corrugated iron, into which dormer windows have been inserted. The end walls have arched openings on the upper level, which are now glazed. One of them has a small balcony. The building has sash windows and one of the external doors has a mail hatch from the days when this building was used as a post office. Partition walls and some ceilings inside are timber. One of the rear rooms has a blue-green lime wash finish that is believed to be early.

== Culture ==
The Jimbour amphitheatre can hold performances with up to 12,000 people. Events are held every second year. In addition Queensland Arts Council stages concerts for small gatherings at Jimbour which are held three times a year.

=== In popular culture ===
Jimbour was the location for the shooting of the 1983 TV mini-series 'Return to Eden'.

== Gallery ==
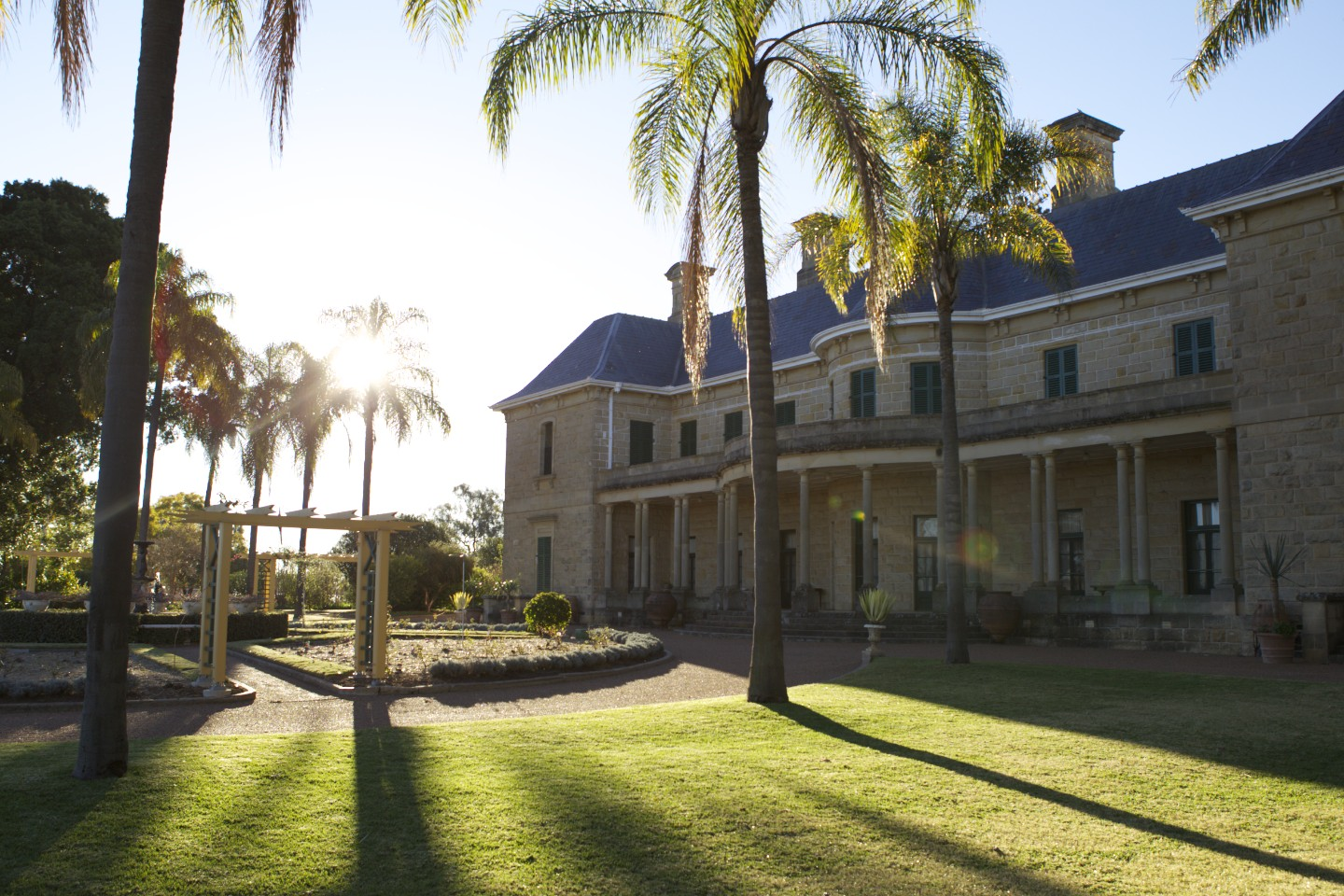
Sunrise in the garden

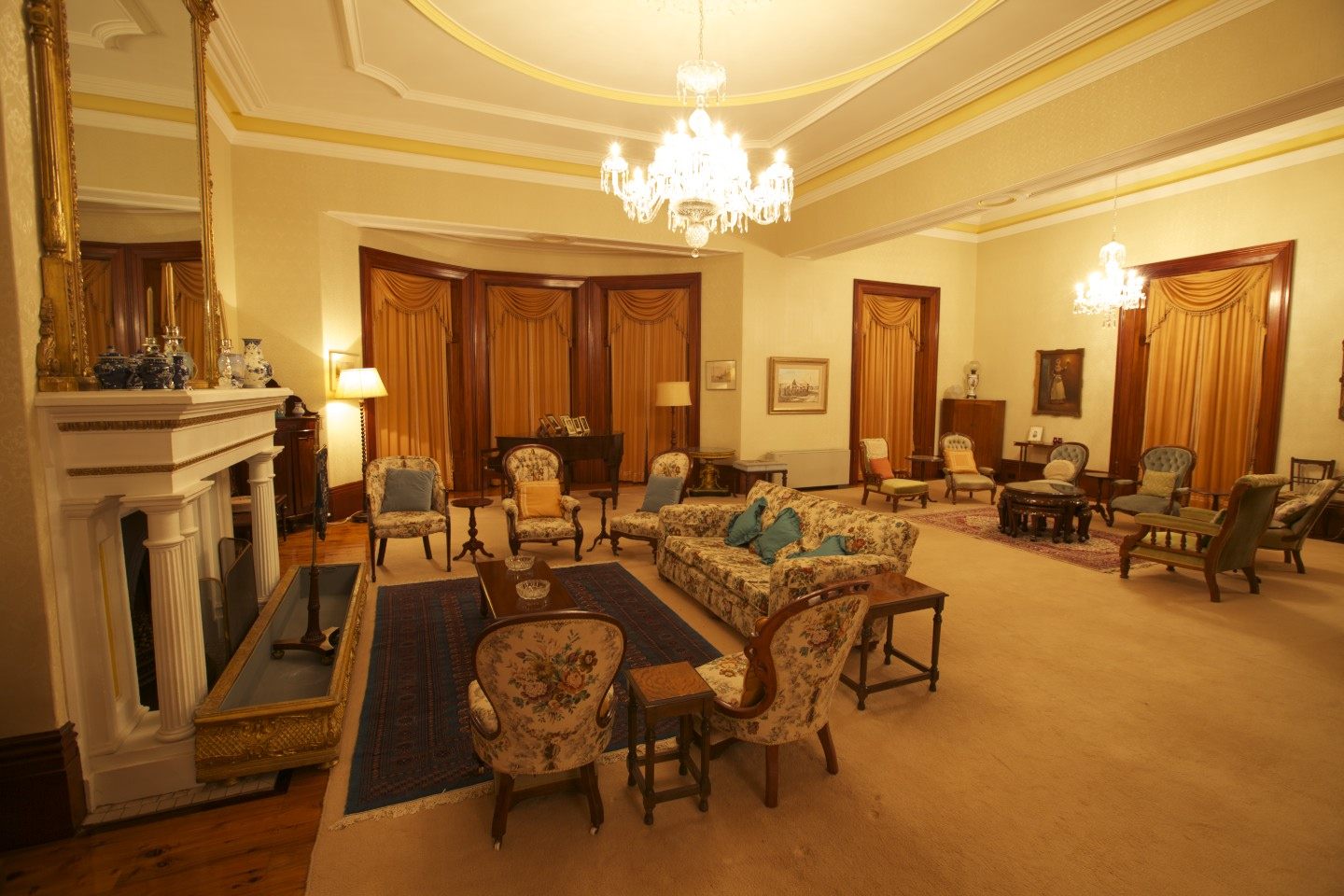
The drawing room

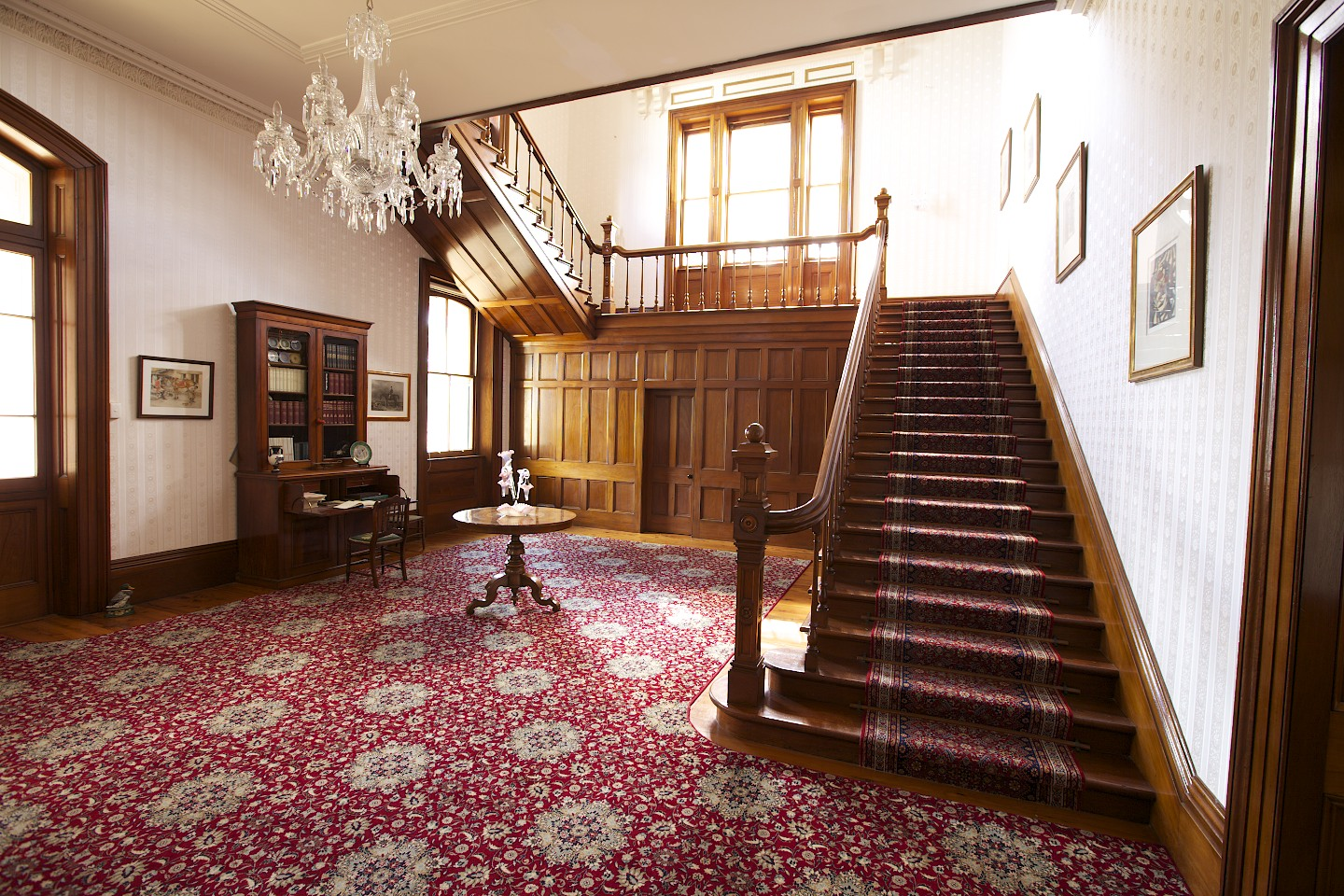
The staircase

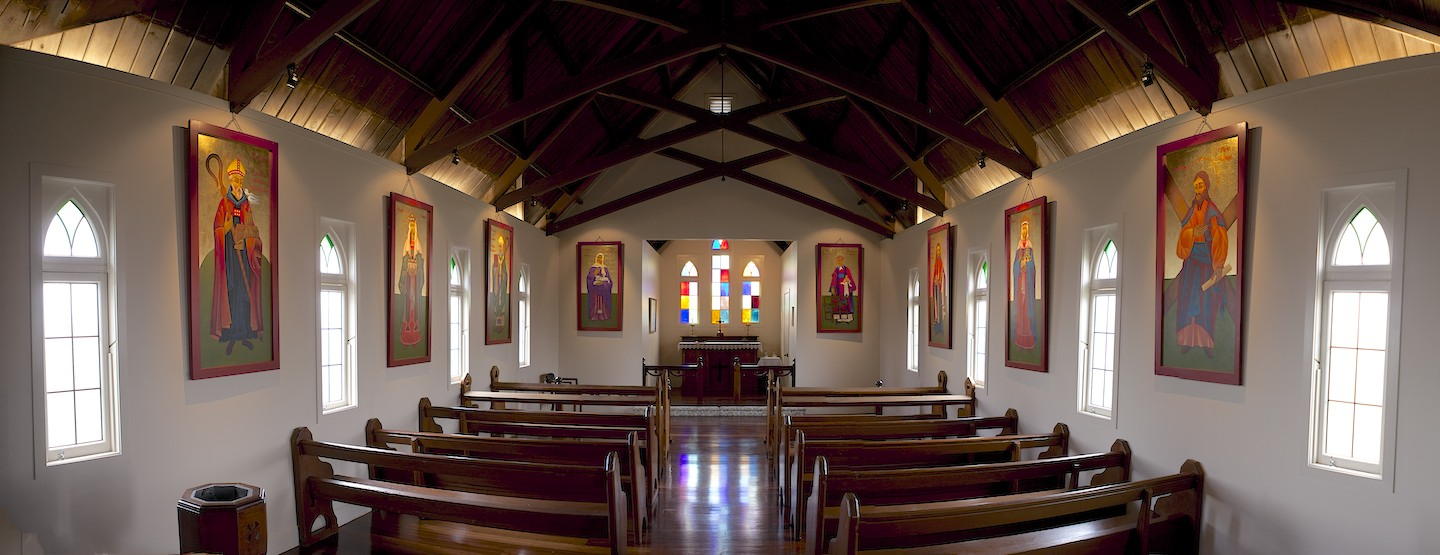
A panorama of the chapel interior

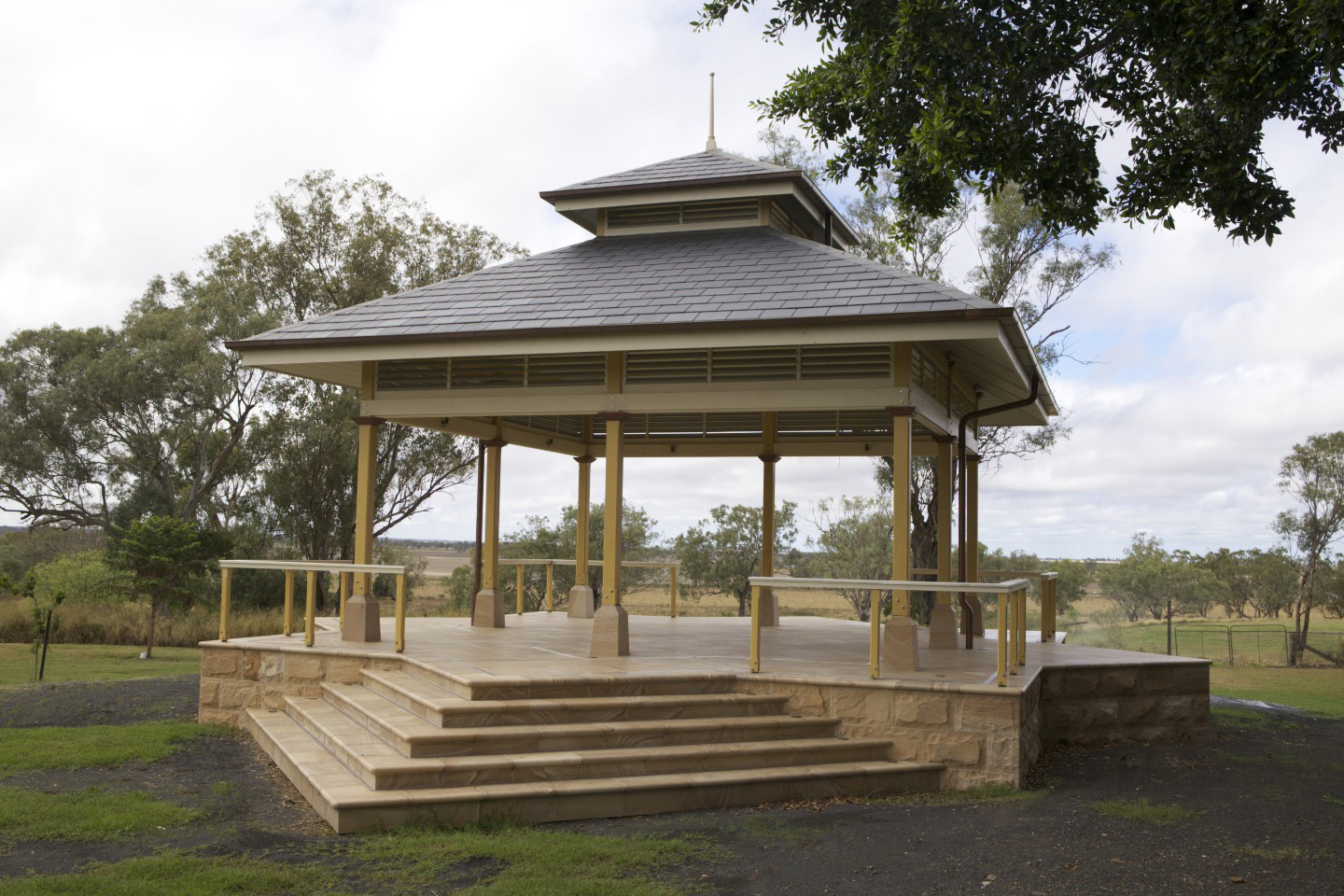
The Summer House

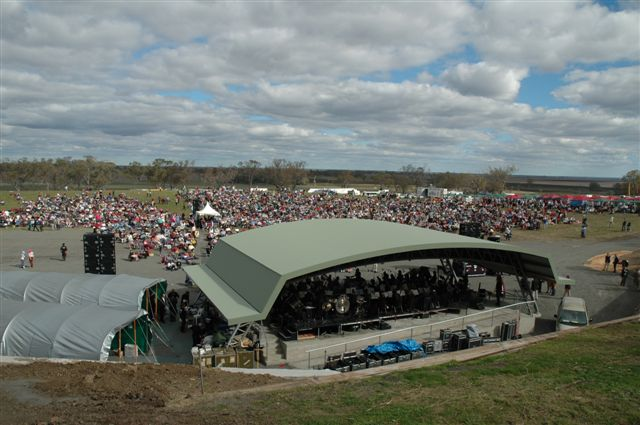
The amphitheatre
