= Prickly pears in Australia =

Invasive cacti in Australia

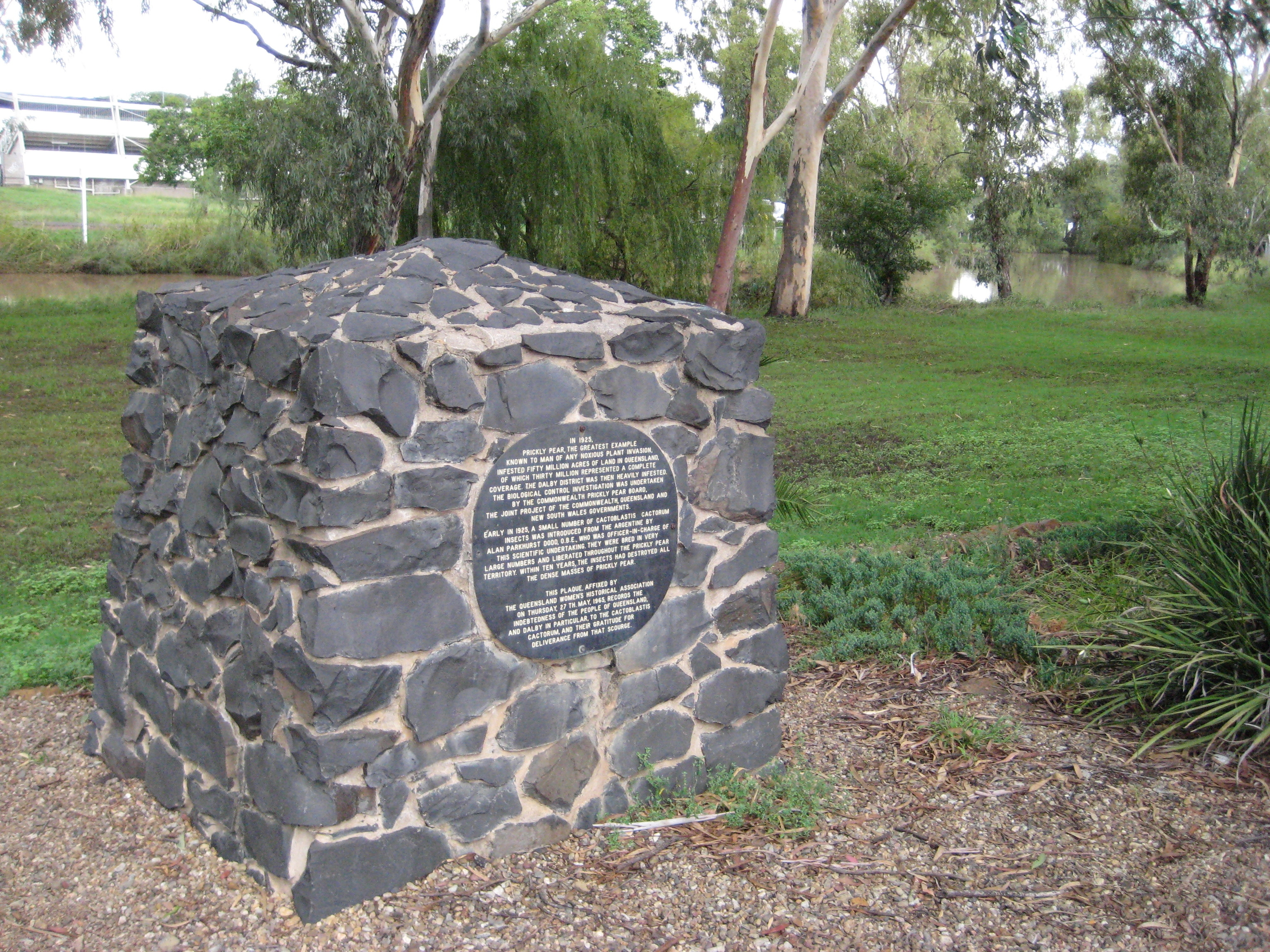
A monument to the Cactoblastis cactorum moth at Dalby, Queensland.

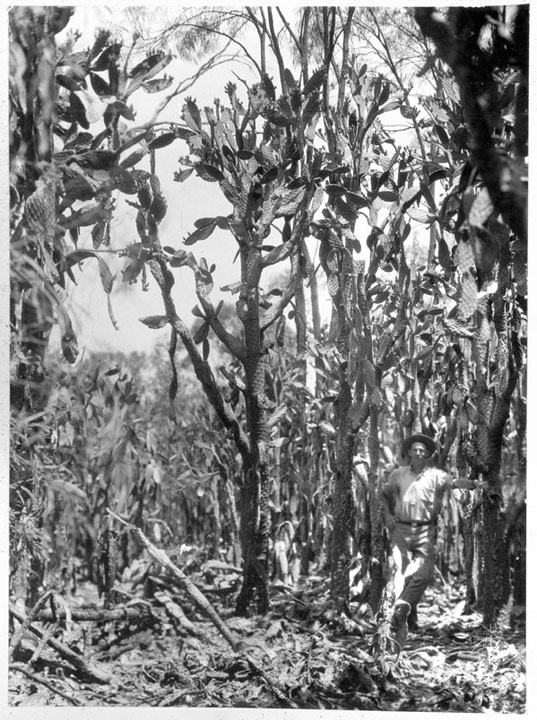
Prickly pear forest circa 1930

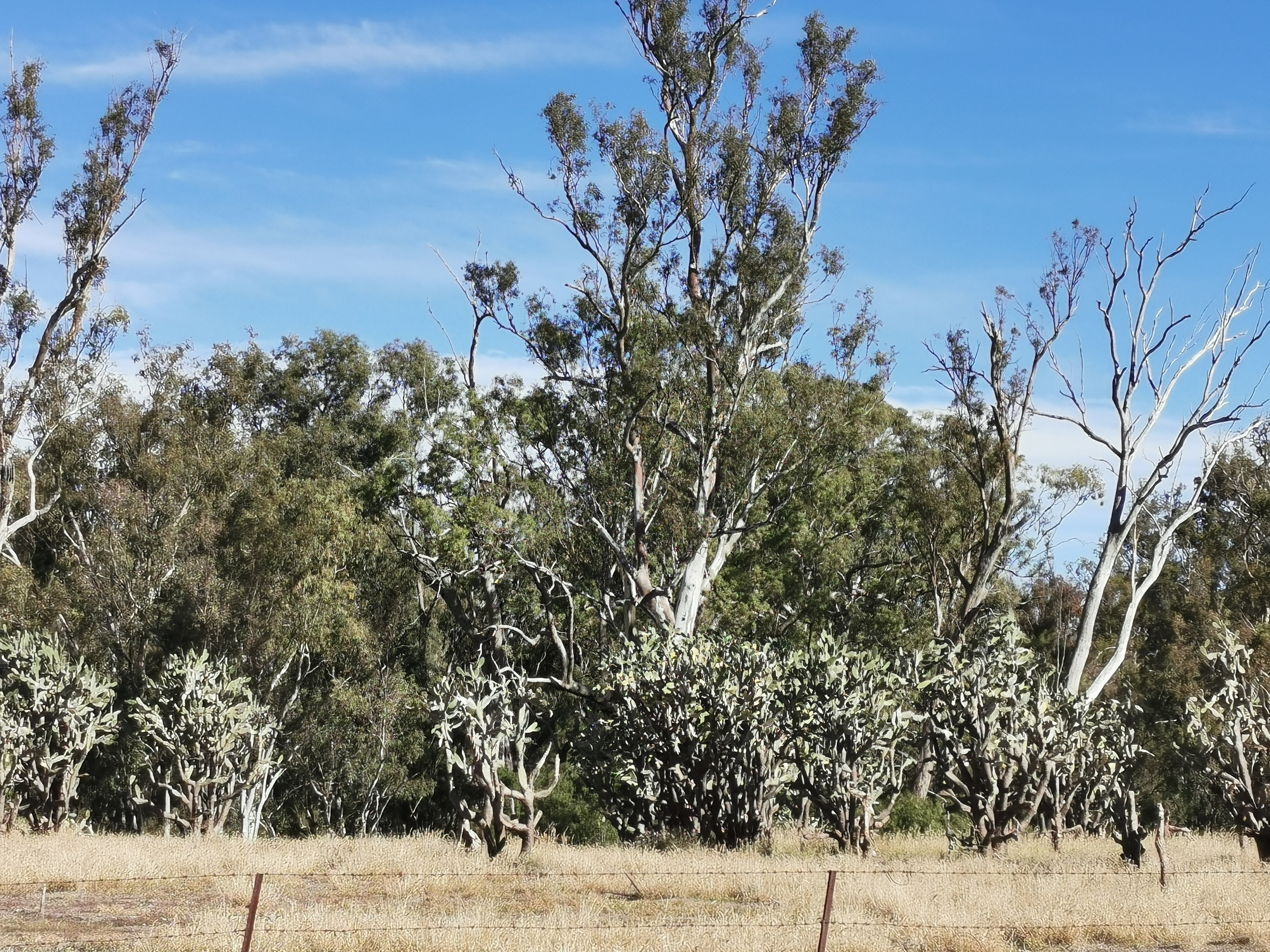
Infestation of O. tomentosa 2019, near Yelarbon, Queensland

Prickly pears (genus Opuntia) include a number of plant species that were introduced and have become invasive in Australia.

Prickly pears (mostly Opuntia stricta) were imported into Australia in the First Fleet as hosts of cochineal insects, used in the dye industry. Many of these, especially the tiger pear, quickly became widespread invasive species, rendering 40,000 km^{2} (15,000 sq mi) of farming land unproductive. The moth Cactoblastis cactorum from Argentina, whose larvae eat prickly pear, was introduced in 1925 and almost wiped out the prickly pear. This case is often cited as an example of successful biological pest control.

A monument to Cactoblastis cactorum was erected in Dalby, Queensland, commemorating the eradication of the prickly pear in the region. The Cactoblastis Memorial Hall in Boonarga, Queensland, also commemorates the eradication.

== Species ==
These Opuntia species are recorded as naturalised in Australia:

- Opuntia aurantiaca
- Opuntia dejecta
- Opuntia dillenii
- Opuntia elata
- Opuntia elatior
- Opuntia engelmannii
- Opuntia ficus-indica
- Opuntia humifusa
- Opuntia leucotricha
- Opuntia microdasys
- Opuntia monacantha
- Opuntia polyacantha
- Opuntia puberula
- Opuntia robusta
- Opuntia schickendantzii
- Opuntia sp. Schrank
- Opuntia streptacantha
- Opuntia stricta
- Opuntia sulphurea
- Opuntia tomentosa

== See also ==
- Invasive species in Australia
- Conservation in Australia
- Agriculture in Australia
