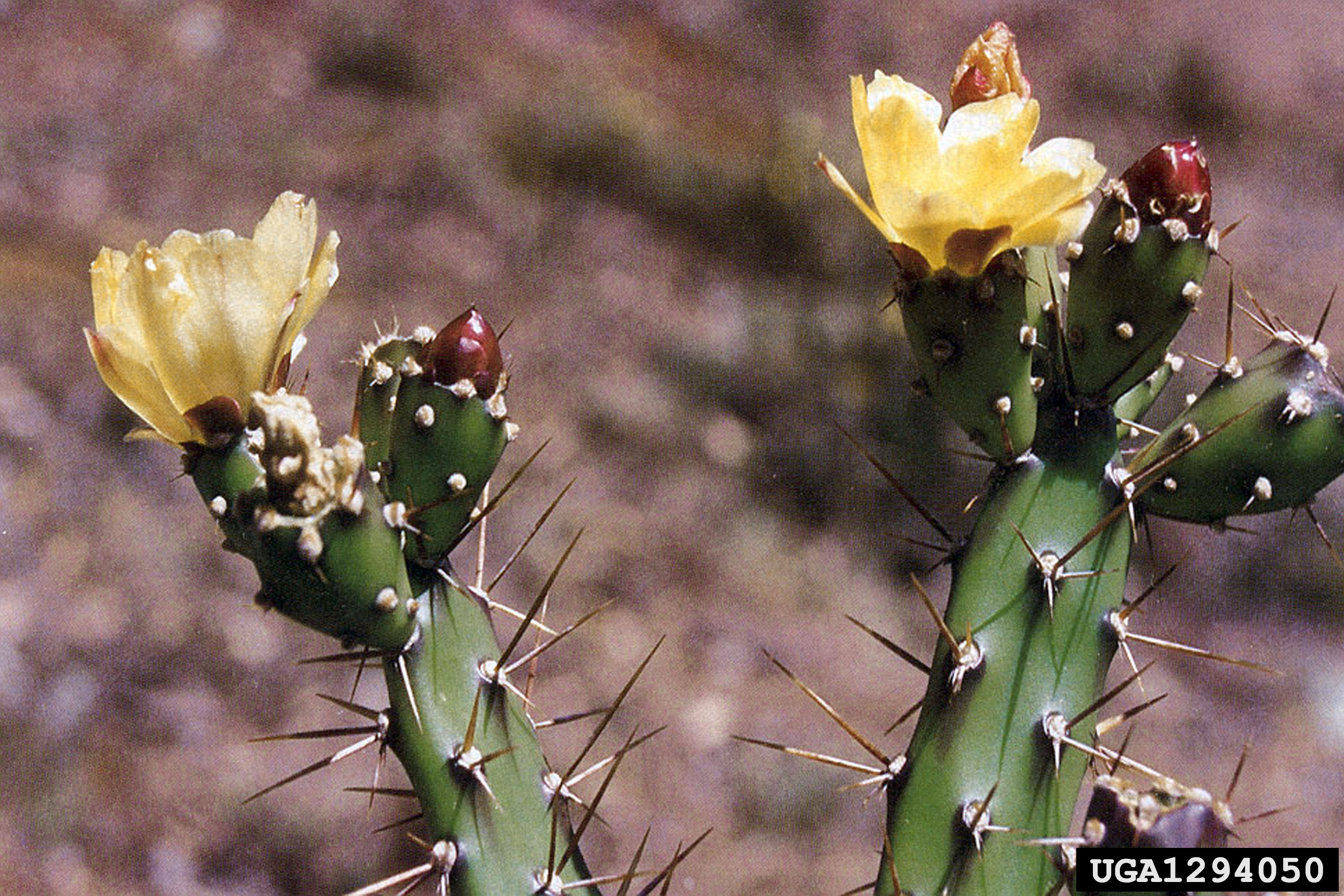

Conservation status
- Least Concern (IUCN 3.1)

Scientific classification
- Kingdom: Plantae
- Clade: Tracheophytes
- Clade: Angiosperms
- Clade: Eudicots
- Order: Caryophyllales
- Family: Cactaceae
- Genus: Opuntia
- Species: O. aurantiaca

Binomial name
- Opuntia aurantiaca Lindl.

= Opuntia aurantiaca =

Species of cactus

Opuntia aurantiaca, commonly known as tiger-pear, jointed cactus or jointed prickly-pear, is a species of cactus from South America. The species occurs naturally in Argentina, Paraguay and Uruguay and is considered an invasive species in Africa and Australia.

== Description ==
Opuntia aurantiaca rarely exceeds 0.5 m in height (may reach 2 m with standing support). Plants consist of up to 100 or more cladodes from 5 to 20 cm long and 1 to 3 cm wide.

== Distribution and habitat ==
This species' native is to Argentina (Buenos Aires and Entre Rios), Uruguay and Paraguay.

== Invasive species ==
It was declared a Weed of National Significance by the Australian Weeds Committee in April 2012, and was reported by the Committee to be the most troublesome of all cactus species in New South Wales and the worst Opuntia species in Queensland. It is currently controlled biologically in Australia using the cochineal insect Dactylopius austrinus, and to a lesser extent by the larvae of two moths, Cactoblastis cactorum and Tucumania tapiacola.

== See also ==
- Prickly pears in Australia
