= Boll Weevil Monument =

- U.S. National Register of Historic Places
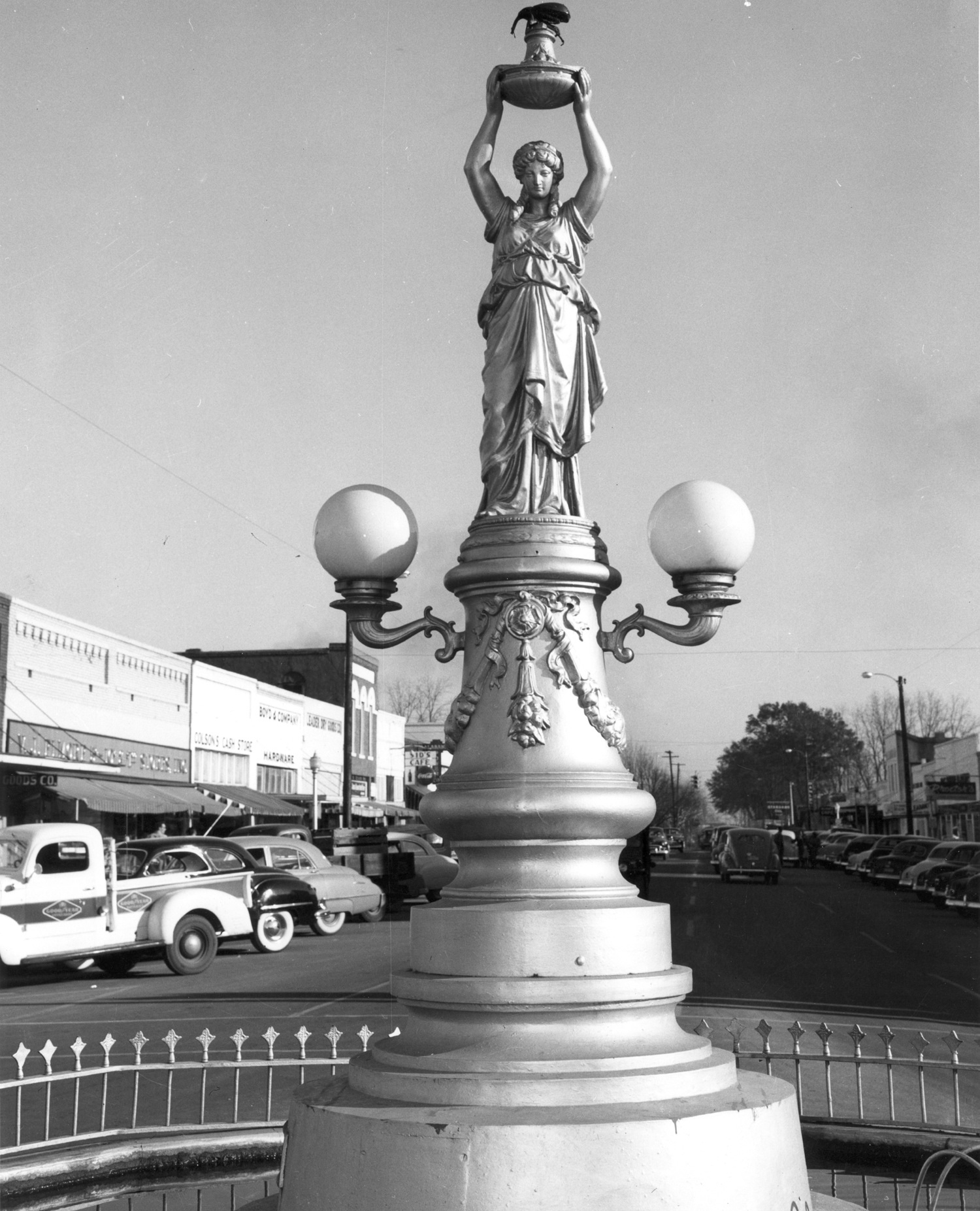
- The Boll Weevil Monument in Enterprise, Alabama at its original location. A replica now stands in its place to prevent theft and vandalism.

- Location within Alabama Location within the United States
- Location: Main and College Sts. Enterprise, Alabama
- Coordinates: 31°18′52″N 85°51′14.5″W
- Built: 1919
- Architect: Bama Foundry Co.
- NRHP reference No.: 73000336
- Added to NRHP: April 26, 1973

The Boll Weevil Monument in downtown Enterprise, Alabama, United States, is a prominent landmark and tribute erected by the citizens of Enterprise in 1919 to show their appreciation to an insect, the boll weevil, for its profound influence on the area's agriculture and economy. Hailing the beetle as a "herald of prosperity," it stands as the world's first monument built to honor an agricultural pest.

The Monument consists of a statue of a woman holding a pedestal with a boll weevil perched on top.

== Story ==
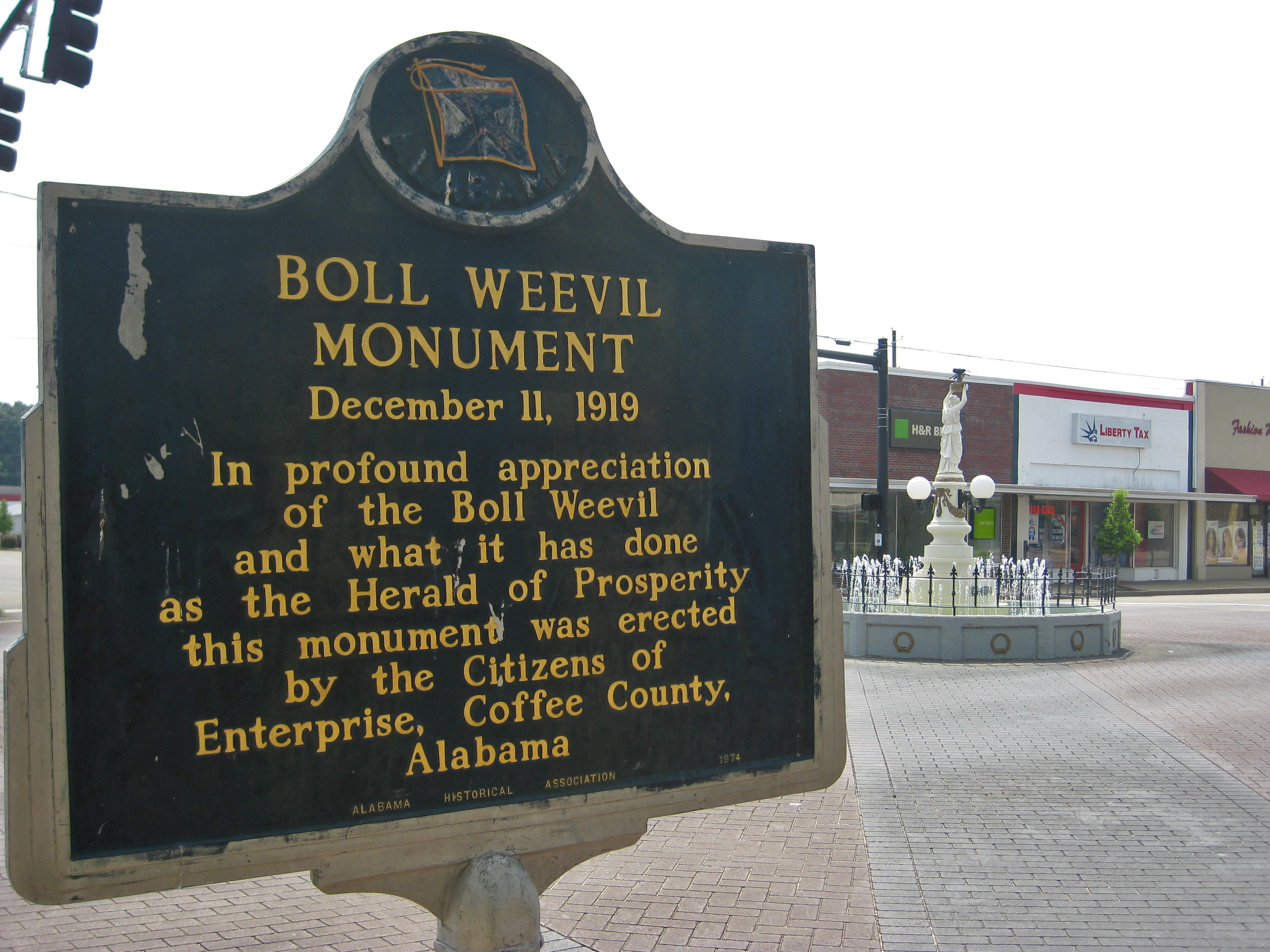
Historical Marker by the monument, at the intersection of Main and College.

The boll weevil (Anthonomus grandis), sometimes referred to as the "Mexican cotton boll weevil" was indigenous to Mexico but appeared in Alabama in 1915. By 1918, farmers were losing whole crops of cotton. H. M. Sessions saw the situation as an opportunity to convert the area to peanut farming. In 1916 he convinced C. W. Baston, an indebted farmer, to back his venture. The first crop paid off their debts and was bought by farmers seeking to change to peanut farming. Cotton was grown again, but farmers learned to diversify their crops, a practice that brought new money to Coffee County.

Bon Fleming, a local businessman, came up with the idea to build a statue and helped to finance the cost. As a tribute to how something disastrous can be a catalyst for change, and a reminder of how the people of Enterprise adjusted in the face of adversity, the monument was dedicated on December 11, 1919, at the intersection of College and Main Street, the heart of the town's business district.

=== Description ===
The monument depicts a female figure known as "Rebekah at the Well" sculpted in classical Greco-Roman style wearing a chiton, with arms stretched above her head holding a trophy topped by an enlarged-scale boll weevil. The statue stands atop an ornately detailed base which supports two round streetlamps. The base stands in the center of a fountain, which is surrounded by a wrought-iron railing. The monument stands more than 13 feet (4.0 m) tall.

At the base of the monument appears the following inscription:

"In profound appreciation of the Boll Weevil and what it has done as the herald of prosperity this monument was erected by the citizens of Enterprise, Coffee County, Alabama."

The original statue of the woman, excluding the fountain and boll weevil, was crafted in Italy for approximately $1,800 (equivalent to $33,000 in 2025). The boll weevil was not added until thirty years later, when Luther Baker thought the Boll Weevil Monument should have a boll weevil on it. He made the boll weevil and mounted it atop the statue.

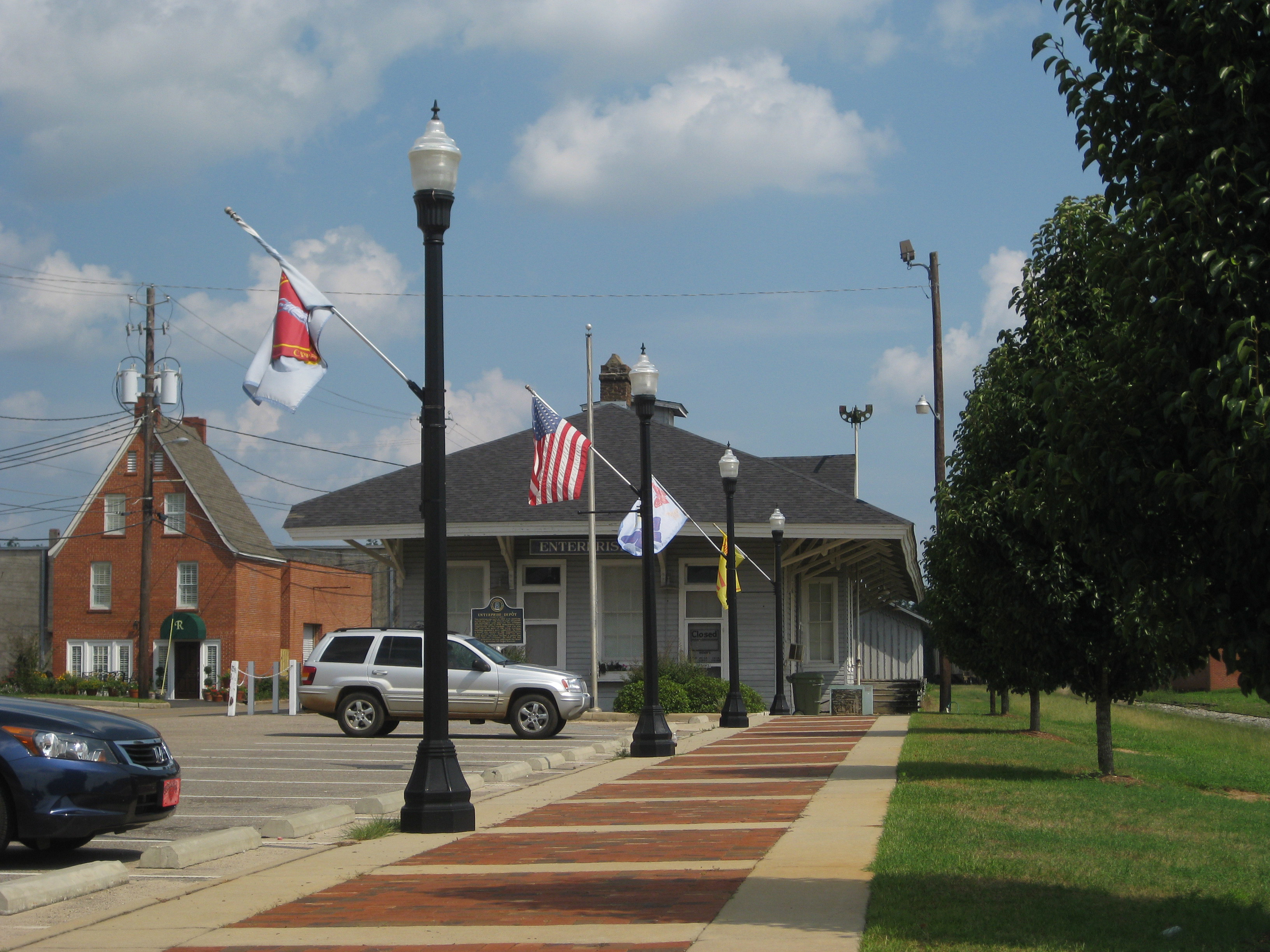
The nearby Depot Museum housed the original statue for a time. In 2019 it was moved to the Pea River Historical and Genealogical Society's Gift Shop.

=== Vandalism ===
The boll weevil, and sometimes even the entire monument, has been repeatedly stolen throughout the years. Each time it was found and repaired by the city of Enterprise until July 11, 1998. On that day, vandals ripped the boll weevil from out of the statue's hands and permanently damaged the statue. City leaders were going to repair the original statue and put it back, but it proved too difficult and costly. A polymer-resin replica was erected in its place in downtown Enterprise in 1998. The original was on display at Enterprise's Depot Museum, a few hundred feet away at 106 Railroad Street. In 2019, following the 100th anniversary of the monument, it was moved to the Pea River Historical and Genealogical Society's Gift Shop. A nearby security camera monitors the monument for further vandalism. In recent memory, dish soap has been poured into the monument fountain resulting in mounds of suds in and around the monument area.

== See also ==
- Cactoblastis cactorum, an agricultural pest introduced to Australia to control invasive cactus species, and commemorated with Cactoblastis Memorial Hall in Queensland.
