= Warra, Queensland =

Warra
- Town
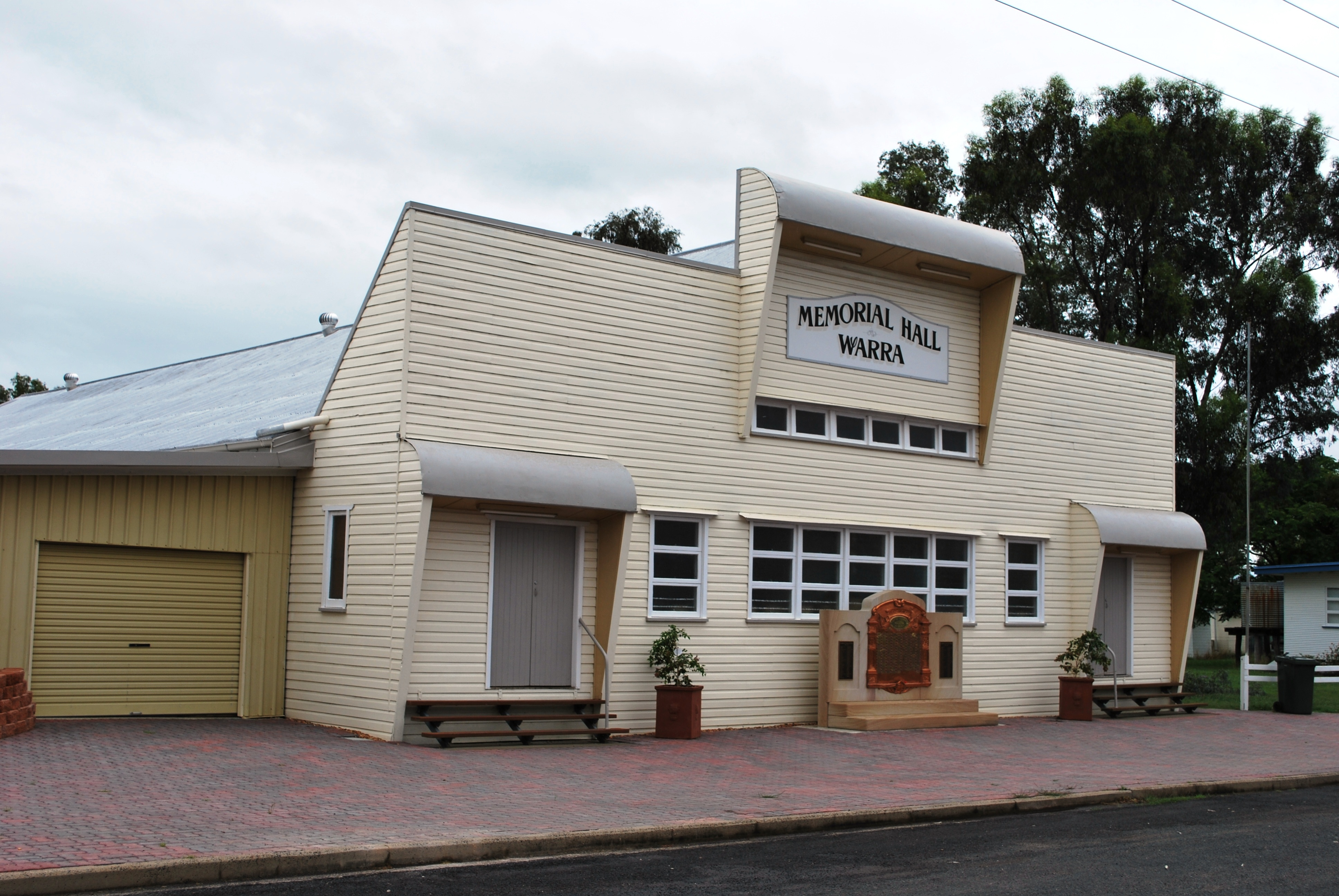
- Warra Memorial Hall

- Interactive map of Warra
- Coordinates: 26.93°S 150.9202°E
- Country: Australia
- State: Queensland
- LGA: Western Downs Region
- Location: 30.4 km (18.9 mi) SW of Jandowae; 35.9 km (22.3 mi) SW of Chinchilla; 45.2 km (28.1 mi) NW of Dalby; 128 km (80 mi) NW of Toowoomba; 256 km (159 mi) WNW of Brisbane

Government
  - State electorate: Callide
  - Federal division: Maranoa

Area
  - Total: 196.9 km^{2} (76.0 sq mi)

Population
  - Total: 180 (2021 census)
  - Density: 0.914/km^{2} (2.37/sq mi)
- Time zone: UTC+10:00 (AEST)
- Postcode: 4411
Localities around Warra
Brigalow	Tuckerang	Tuckerang
Brigalow	Warra	Jimbour West
Kogan	Macalister	Macalister

Warra is a rural town and locality in the Western Downs Region, Queensland, Australia. In the 2021 census, the locality of Warra had a population of 180 people.

== Geography ==
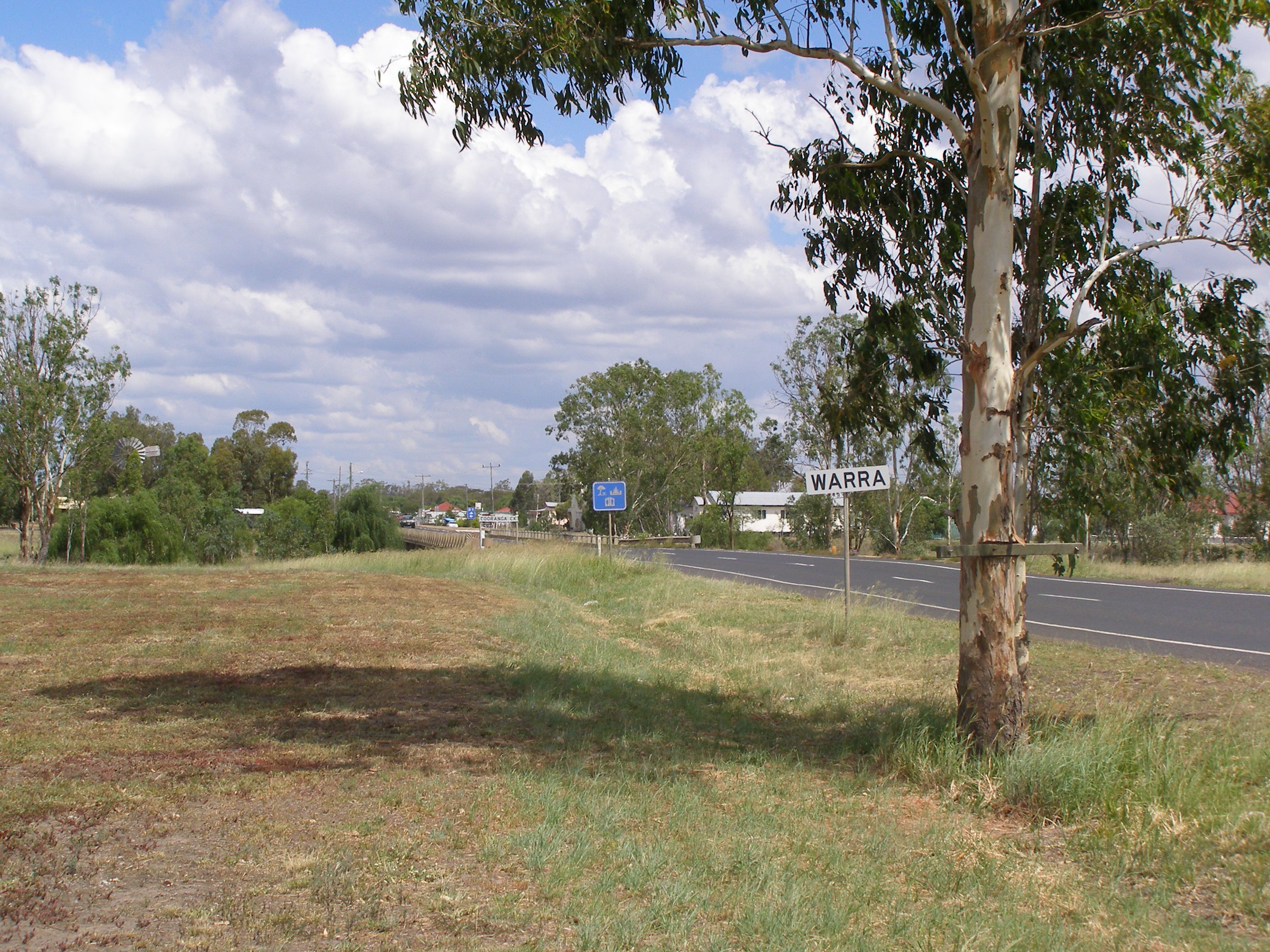
Entering Warra from the west on the Warrego Highway, 2007

Warra is on the Darling Downs, a farming area in Queensland. It is on the Warrego Highway, 256 kilometres (159 mi) north west of the state capital, Brisbane.

The locality is bounded to the north by Haystack Road and Seigmeiers Road and to the south-west by the Condamine River. The town is located to the west of centre of the locality.

The Warrego Highway and Western railway line enter the locality from the south-east (Macalister), pass through the town, and exit to the west (Brigalow). Warra railway station serves the town (26.9280°S 150.9200°E). The highway is known as Thorne Street within the town.

Haystack is a neighbourhood in the north-west of the locality on the boundary with Tuckerang (26.85°S 150.9166°E).

The land use is a mixture of dry and irrigated cropping with some grazing on native vegetation.

== History ==
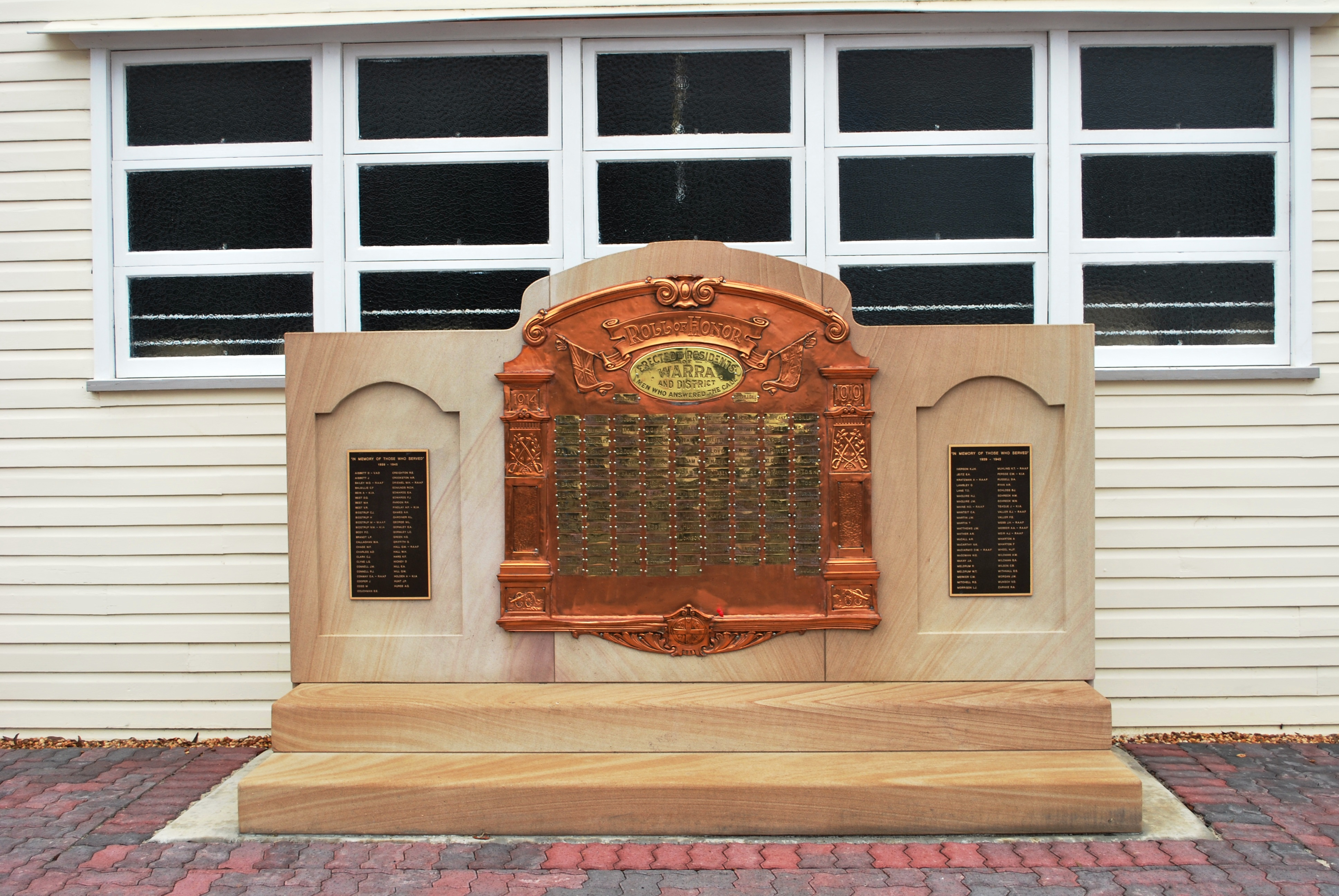
Warra War Memorial, 2008

The town takes its name from the Warra Warra pastoral run, which was previously called Cobble Cobble. The run was operated by Henry Dennis in the late 1840s, then by Colin McKenzie from 1848, then by Mr Thorne circa 1864. The name Warra Warra is believed to be from the Mandandanji language meaning a woman carrying a load or plenty of water.

Warra Provisional School opened on 12 April 1881. On 21 January 1889, it became Warra State School. In 1977 a pre-school was added.

On Friday 9 November 1906, Archdeacon Edward Bush Trotter, assisted by the Reverend William Powning Glover of Dalby, laid the foundation stone for All Saints' Anglican Church. On Tuesday 26 March 1907, Archbishop St Clair Donaldson officially opened and dedicated the church.

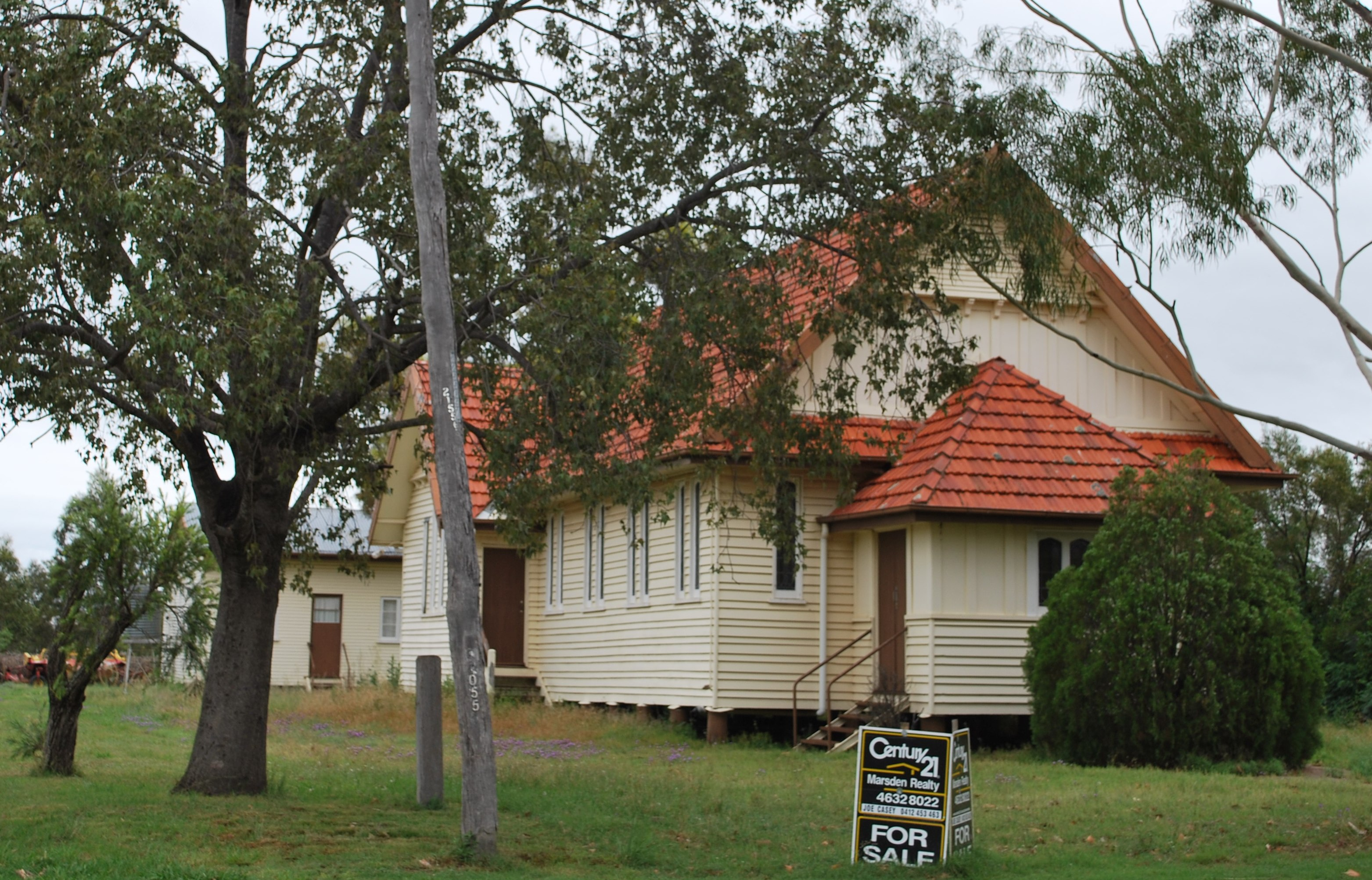
Former Warra Uniting Church, 2008

In April 1907, Samuel Alexander Taylor of Logie Plains pastoral station decided to build a Presbyterian church in Warra at his own expense. It is unclear when the Presbyterian Church opened, but it was in operation by May 1908. In the 1970s, when the Uniting Church in Australia was created through amalgamation of Presbyterian, Methodist and Congregational churches, it became Warra Uniting Church. In 2005, the church at 14 Lytton Street (26.9311°S 150.9187°E) was sold into private ownership and then converted into a residence.

Daiwan State School opened in 18 October 1910. In 1924, it was renamed Haystack State School. It closed in 1968. In 1921, it was on the south-west corner of Haystack Noola Road and Haystack North Road in neighbouring Tuckerang (26.8215°S 150.9182°E). In 1938, it was at 1054 Haystack Road in Warra (26.8471°S 150.9146°E).

On Sunday 30 March 1913, Archbishop James Duhig blessed and officially opened St Francis Xavier Catholic Church. The church was destroyed in a storm on 15 December 1980.

Braeside State School opened on 24 May 1915 and closed on 31 October 1923. On 31 January 1928, it reopened and closed permanently on 4 August 1950.

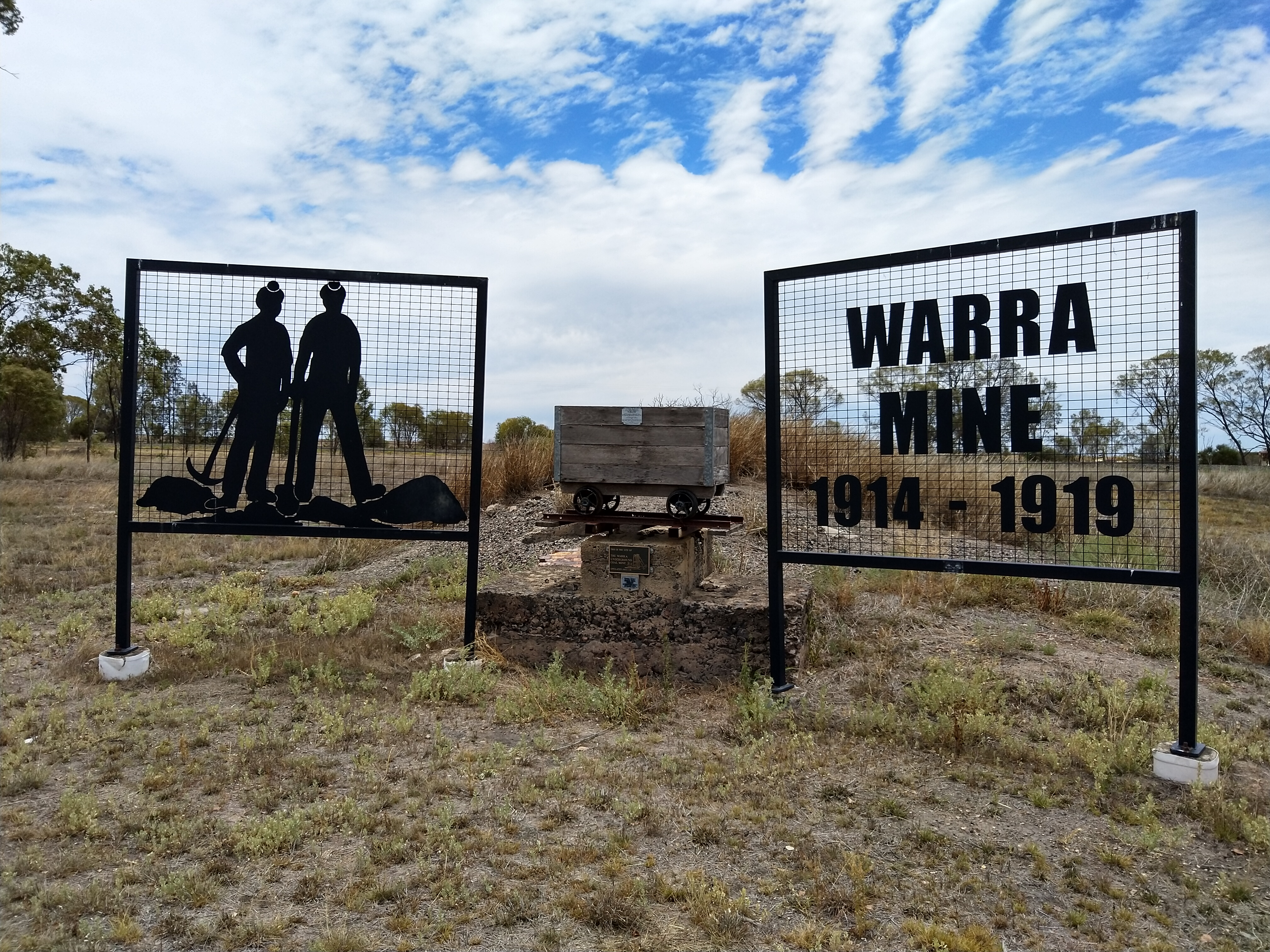
Warra coal mine Memorial, 2020.

Between December 1915 and July 1919, the Queensland Labor Government operated a coal mine at Warra, one of several such State Enterprises. The mine supplied coal for the southern railways, and, by 1915, was producing 120 tons weekly which could be loaded directly into engines at the pithead. However, the mine was plagued from the start with water seepage problems, causing the original shaft to be abandoned after November 1916. The mine yielded a total 13,528 tons of coal, and the net financial result was a loss of £38,058.

The Warra Honour Board was unveiled on 14 May 1917 by Member of the Queensland Legislative Assembly in Dalby, William Vowles.

Llanberris Provisional School opened on 17 November 1919 and closed on 27 April 1923.

== Demographics ==
In the 2006 census, the locality of Warra had a population of 84 people.

In the 2016 census, the locality of Warra had a population of 205 people.

In the 2021 census, the locality of Warra had a population of 180 people.

== Economy ==
There are a number of homesteads in the locality:

- Barooga (26.9551°S 150.9820°E)
- Caramar (26.9566°S 150.9801°E)
- Clover-Lea (26.8504°S 150.8952°E)
- Coolden (26.9619°S 150.9699°E)
- David Downs (26.9704°S 150.9075°E)
- Devonia (26.8763°S 150.9938°E)
- Ferndale (26.8550°S 150.8892°E)
- Glengrove (26.8603°S 150.9139°E)
- Glennesk (26.8476°S 150.9186°E)
- Gracevale (26.8809°S 150.8885°E)
- Grasslands (26.8780°S 150.9032°E)
- Jinghi Jinghi (26.8750°S 150.8712°E)
- Kareelah (26.9508°S 150.9531°E)
- Logie (26.9807°S 150.9258°E)
- Maudlands (26.8621°S 150.8912°E)
- Maylingup (26.9420°S 150.8903°E)
- Mylin Park (26.9434°S 150.9732°E)
- Parkina (27.0076°S 150.9770°E)
- Rakaia (26.8801°S 150.9647°E)
- Renbar (26.8729°S 150.9756°E)
- The Mead (26.9770°S 150.9876°E)
- Trumpeters Corner (26.8659°S 151.0119°E)
- Vickeries (26.8853°S 150.9554°E)
- Warruga (26.9502°S 150.9525°E)
- Waverley (27.0012°S 150.9773°E)
- Windale (26.9400°S 150.9650°E)
- Winya Park (abandoned) (26.8498°S 150.9341°E)
- Wruwallin (26.8951°S 150.8812°E)
- Wywurrie (26.8883°S 150.9097°E)

== Education ==
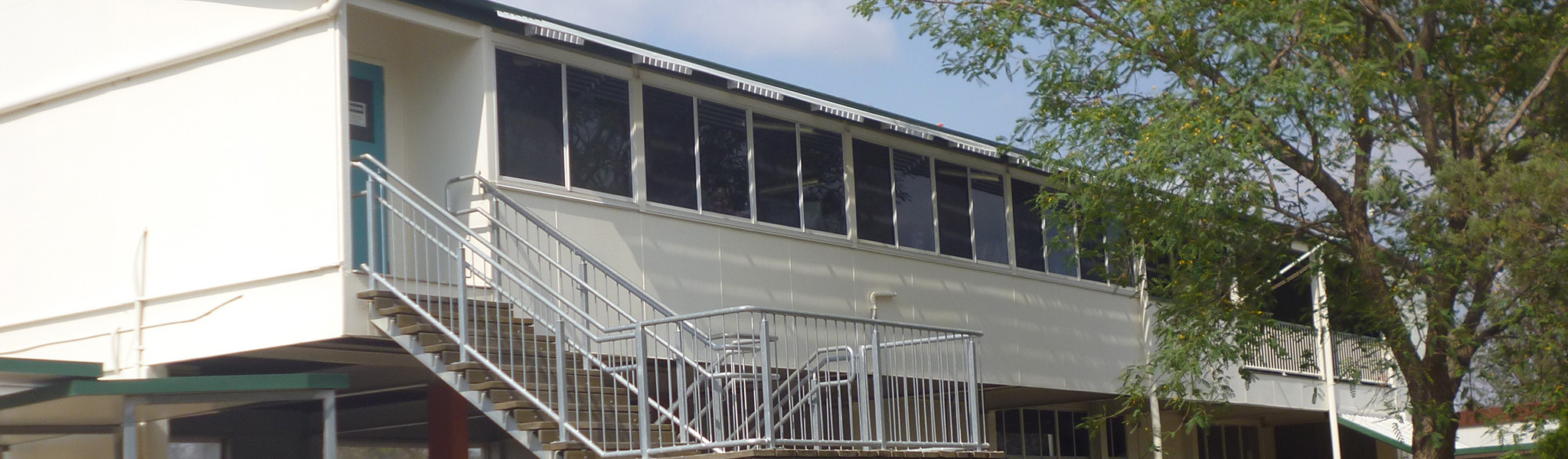
Warra State School classrooms, 2019

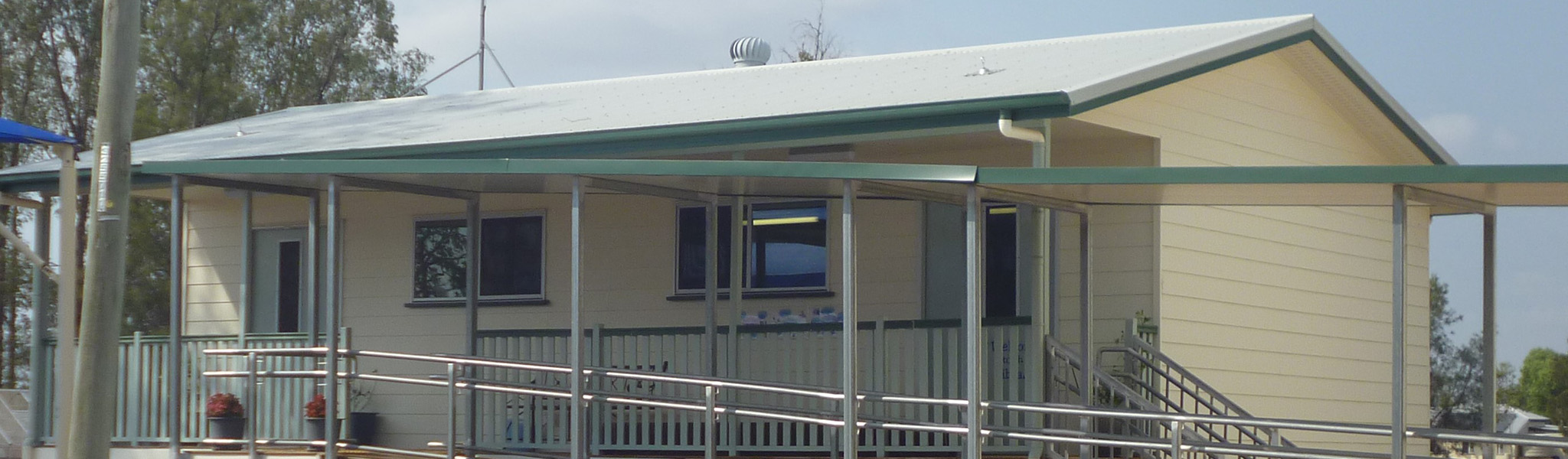
Warra State School resource centre, 2024

Warra State School is a government primary (Prep–6) school for boys and girls at Robinson Street (26.9302°S 150.9176°E). In 2016, the school had an enrolment of 10 students with 3 teachers (1 full-time equivalent) and 4 non-teaching staff (1 full-time equivalent). In 2018, the school had an enrolment of 11 students with 3 teachers (1 full-time equivalent) and 3 non-teaching staff (1 full-time equivalent). In 2023, the school had an enrolment of 6 students.

There are no secondary schools in Warra. The nearest government secondary schools are Jandowae State School (to Year 10) in Jandowae to the north-east, Chinchilla State High School (to Year 12) in Chinchilla to the north-west and Dalby State High School in Dalby to the south-east.

== Amenities ==
The Warra Memorial Hall is at 8–10 Thorne Street (26.9296°S 150.9187°E).

All Saints Anglican Church is in Lytton Street (26.9297°S 150.9178°E). Being the only church now in Warra, the church is used for Catholic and Uniting church services in addition to the Anglican services.

== Attractions ==
A bell tower with the original bell and cross from St Francis Xavier Catholic Church stands on the site of the church just west of the town on the Warrego Highway (26.9272°S 150.9168°E). A plaque commemorates the church.

== Notable residents ==
Aboriginal boxing legend Jerry Jerome commenced his boxing career in Warra.

== Miscellaneous ==
The name Warra has been used as a name for a crater on the planet Mars, without specifically commemorating the town.
