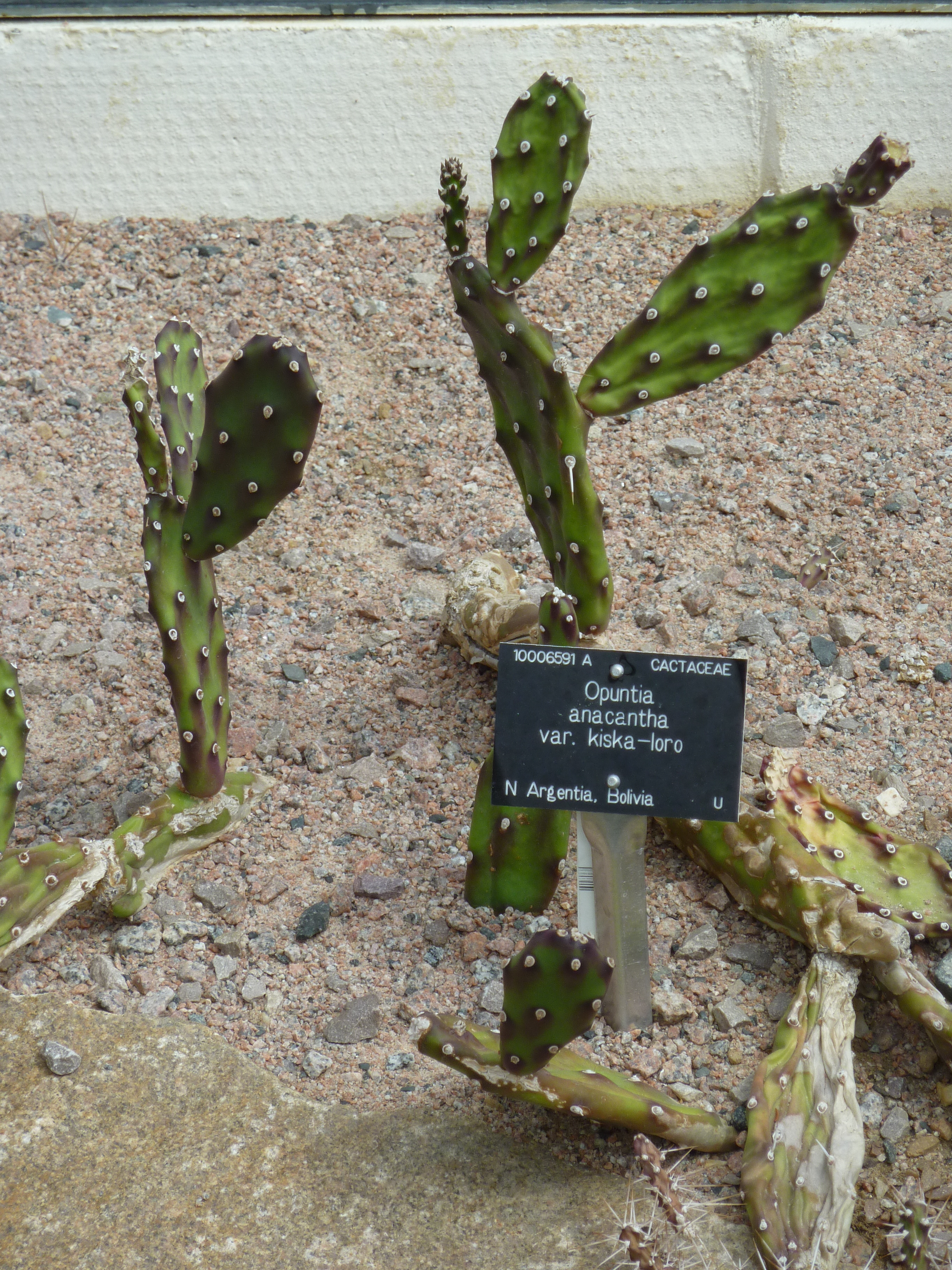

Conservation status
- Least Concern (IUCN 3.1)

Scientific classification
- Kingdom: Plantae
- Clade: Embryophytes
- Clade: Tracheophytes
- Clade: Spermatophytes
- Clade: Angiosperms
- Clade: Eudicots
- Order: Caryophyllales
- Family: Cactaceae
- Genus: Opuntia
- Species: O. anacantha

Binomial name
- Opuntia anacantha Speg.

Synonyms
- Opuntia bispinosa Backeb.; Opuntia canina Speg.; Opuntia fuscolineata Starm. & Mucher; Opuntia kiskaloro Speg.; Opuntia retrorsa Speg.; Opuntia roborensis Cárdenas; Opuntia utkilio Speg.; Opuntia vitelliniflora (F. Ritter) P.J. Braun & Esteves Pereira; Platyopuntia kiskaloro (Speg.) F. Ritter; Platyopuntia retrorsa (Speg.) F. Ritter; Platyopuntia vitelliniflora F. Ritter

= Opuntia anacantha =

Species of cactus

Opuntia anacantha is a species belonging to the family Cactaceae, native to northern Argentina and Bolivia.

== Description ==
Shrubby cactus of about 60 cm high and 2.5 wide, normally prostrate, sometimes climbs due to its adventitious roots. The dark green segments are flat, narrow and elliptical in shape, about 5 to 40 cm long and 3.5 to 7 cm wide. The areolas are small. Orange or orange yellow flowers 4 cm long.

== Taxonomy ==
Opuntia anacantha was described by Carlos Luis Spegazzini and published in Bulletin du Muséum d'Histoire Naturelle 1904. As of October 2022, Plants of the World Online regarded it as a synonym of Opuntia elata var. elata.

=== Etymology ===
Opuntia : generic name that comes from the Greek used by Pliny the Elder for a plant that grew around the city of Opus in Greece.

anacantha : Latin epithet meaning "without thorns".
