= Brigalow, Queensland =

Brigalow
- Town
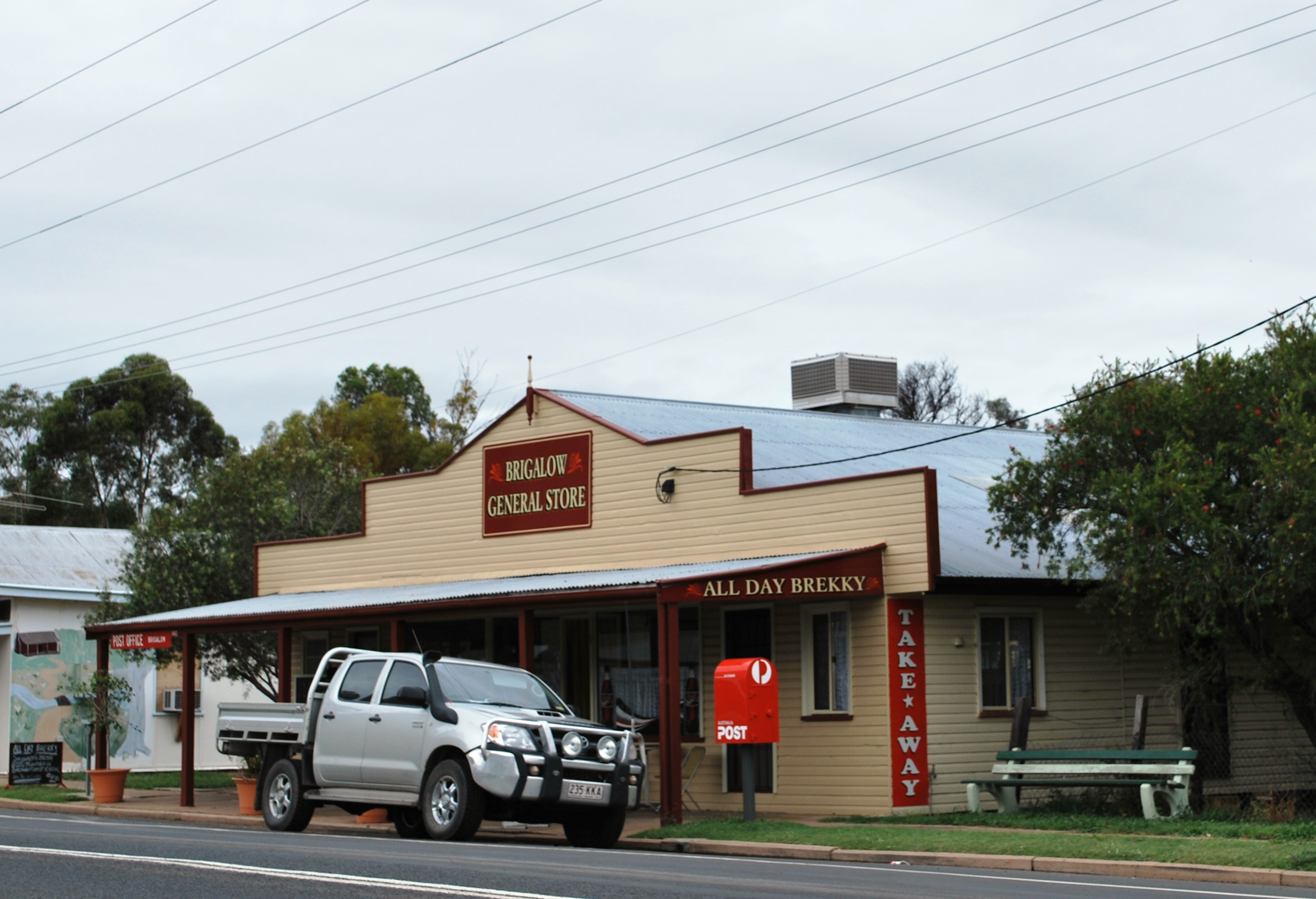
- Brigalow General Store

- Interactive map of Brigalow
- Coordinates: 26.8422°S 150.7883°E
- Country: Australia
- State: Queensland
- LGA: Western Downs Region
- Location: 19.9 km (12.4 mi) SE of Chinchilla; 61.3 km (38.1 mi) NW of Dalby; 144 km (89 mi) NW of Toowoomba; 272 km (169 mi) WNW of Brisbane

Government
  - State electorate: Callide
  - Federal division: Maranoa

Area
  - Total: 273.9 km^{2} (105.8 sq mi)
- Elevation: 168 m (551 ft)

Population
  - Total: 181 (2021 census)
  - Density: 0.6608/km^{2} (1.712/sq mi)
- Time zone: UTC+10:00 (AEST)
- Postcode: 4412
- Mean max temp: 28.5 °C (83.3 °F)
- Mean min temp: 14.4 °C (57.9 °F)
- Annual rainfall: 711.4 mm (28.01 in)
Localities around Brigalow
Boonarga	Chances Plain; Wychie	Tuckerang
Hopeland	Brigalow	Warra
Kogan	Kogan	Kogan

Brigalow is a rural town and locality in the Western Downs Region, Queensland, Australia. In the 2021 census, the locality of Brigalow had a population of 181 people.

== Geography ==
Brigalow is on the Darling Downs. The town is in the north-west of the locality.

The Condamine River enters the locality from the south-east (Kogan / Warra) and exits to the north-west (Hopeland / Boonarga).

The Warrego Highway enters the locality from the east (Warra), then proceeds north-west passing through the town, and then exits to the north-west (Boonarga). The Western railway line runs immediately north and parallel to the highway with two railway stations within the locality:

- Ehlma railway station, now abandoned (26.8936°S 150.8674°E)
- Brigalow railway station, serving the town (26.8419°S 150.7882°E)

Apart from the power station and mines in the south-west of the locality, the predominant surface land use is a mixture of crop growing in the north of the locality and grazing on native vegetation in the south of the locality. Crops grown in the area include wheat, barley, sorghum, chick peas, and cotton.

=== Climate ===
Brigalow has a semi-arid-influenced humid subtropical climate (Köppen: Cfa). It experiences hot, wetter summers and mild, dry winters.

Climate data for Brigalow (24.84°S 149.80°E, 168 m (551 ft) m AMSL) (1965–2012 data)
Month	Jan	Feb	Mar	Apr	May	Jun	Jul	Aug	Sep	Oct	Nov	Dec	Year
Record high °C (°F)	45.4 (113.7)	43.0 (109.4)	40.6 (105.1)	37.9 (100.2)	32.5 (90.5)	31.5 (88.7)	29.3 (84.7)	34.2 (93.6)	37.2 (99.0)	40.3 (104.5)	43.5 (110.3)	42.7 (108.9)	45.4 (113.7)
Mean daily maximum °C (°F)	33.6 (92.5)	32.5 (90.5)	31.7 (89.1)	29.0 (84.2)	25.4 (77.7)	22.1 (71.8)	21.8 (71.2)	23.8 (74.8)	27.2 (81.0)	30.0 (86.0)	31.6 (88.9)	33.1 (91.6)	28.5 (83.3)
Mean daily minimum °C (°F)	21.0 (69.8)	20.6 (69.1)	18.7 (65.7)	15.1 (59.2)	11.5 (52.7)	8.0 (46.4)	6.5 (43.7)	7.6 (45.7)	11.0 (51.8)	14.8 (58.6)	17.7 (63.9)	19.8 (67.6)	14.4 (57.9)
Record low °C (°F)	12.8 (55.0)	13.6 (56.5)	9.0 (48.2)	3.5 (38.3)	−0.4 (31.3)	−2.4 (27.7)	−3.7 (25.3)	−1.9 (28.6)	1.5 (34.7)	3.9 (39.0)	7.1 (44.8)	10.0 (50.0)	−3.7 (25.3)
Average precipitation mm (inches)	94.3 (3.71)	109.6 (4.31)	46.0 (1.81)	43.4 (1.71)	46.7 (1.84)	28.5 (1.12)	29.8 (1.17)	28.0 (1.10)	34.9 (1.37)	62.0 (2.44)	78.2 (3.08)	110.7 (4.36)	711.4 (28.01)
Average precipitation days (≥ 1.0 mm)	6.8	6.5	4.3	3.1	3.3	2.7	2.8	2.5	2.7	4.8	6.2	6.8	52.5
Mean monthly sunshine hours	226.3	197.8	223.2	213.0	195.3	195.0	210.8	229.4	246.0	254.2	249.0	254.2	2,694.2
Percentage possible sunshine	54	54	59	62	58	62	64	66	69	64	62	59	61
Source: Bureau of Meteorology (1965–2012 data)

== History ==
In 1859, a township called Campbell's Camp (26.8861°S 150.76979°E) was established on the banks of the Condamine River at a place where bullock teams could cross the river. In September 1862, the Queensland Government held a land sale of town, suburban, and country lots.

Mulga Provisional School opened in 1896. On 1 January 1909, it became Mulga State School. In 1914, it ceased to be a full-time school and became a half-time school in conjunction with Hill Top Provisional School (later Boonarga State School) with the two schools sharing one teacher. Mulga State School closed in 1915, but reopened in 1917 as a full-time school. It permanently closed in 1943. It was located on a L-shaped land parcel on the kink in Jones Road (26.8747°S 150.8044°E).

Brigalow Provisional School opened on 24 February 1908. In 1910, it became Brigalow State School.

Brigalow Post Office opened by November 1912 (a receiving office, originally named Mulga, had been open from 1895) and closed around 1993.

Ehlma State School opened on 14 April 1913. It closed in 1965. It was on Ehlma Boundary Road (26.89283°S 150.86728°E) to the immediate north of the Ehlma railway station.

The Bethania Lutheran Church opened in Brigalow in 1914. It closed in 1961. Although the church building has been removed, its cemetery remains (and is now within the locality boundaries of Wychie).

The first wedding in the Brigalow Methodist Church was celebrated on 28 February 1923.

Blackwood Provisional School opened on 19 July 1915 and closed on 27 October 1932. On 12 November 1932, the school was reopened and renamed Belah State School. It closed in 1962. In 1921, the school was on Inverai Road (26.7601°S 150.8508°E). In 1938, the school was at 1249 Ehlma Boundary Road(26.7832°S 150.8855°E). Both of these locations are now in Wychie.

Noola State School opened on 5 April 1923. Circa 1957, it renamed Noola Plains State School. It closed circa 1961. It was at 600 Brigalow Canaga Creek Road (26.8069°S 150.8219°E), now in Wychie.

The Kogan Creek Power Station opened in 2006.

== Demographics ==
In the 2006 census, the locality of Brigalow and the surrounding area had a population of 457 people.

In the 2016 census, the locality of Brigalow had a population of 170 people.

In the 2021 census, the locality of Brigalow had a population of 181 people.

== Economy ==
The Kogan Creek Power Station is a coal-fired power station in the south-west of the locality (26.9194°S 150.7516°E). At 750 MW, it is the largest single unit in Australia. Construction by a consortium led by Siemens commenced in 2004 and was completed in 2007. It was opened by the Queensland Premier Anna Bligh and Minister for Mines and Energy Geoff Wilson on 27 November 2007.

The Kogan Creek coal mine is located to the south-east of the power station. It is an open-cut mine which supplies the power station with approximately 2.5Mt of coal each year.

From the town to the south of locality is within petroleum leases held by Arrow CSG (Australia) and Australian CBM to extract coal seam gas. The extraction of coal seam gas within farming districts is controversial in Australia due to concerns that groundwater under prime grazing and cropping land could be contaminated. In April 2018 one operator in Hopeland (to the immediate west of Brigalow), Linc Energy, was fined $4.5 million in May 2019 for causing environmental harm through its underground coal gasification plant.

In the agricultural economy, there are a number of homesteads in the locality, including:

- Allendale (26.9047°S 150.8760°E)
- Avonmore (26.8956°S 150.8645°E)
- Beltana (26.9262°S 150.8592°E)
- Bluebell Park (26.8299°S 150.8038°E)
- Eureka (26.7896°S 150.7809°E)
- Glencara (26.9359°S 150.8242°E)
- Greenacres (26.8491°S 150.8316°E)
- Heather Vale (26.8267°S 150.7984°E)
- Kalora (26.9396°S 150.8295°E)
- Laguna (26.9800°S 150.7556°E)
- Merina Park (26.9375°S 150.7805°E)
- Minie Vale (26.8542°S 150.8265°E)
- Oakbank (26.7912°S 150.8202°E)
- Quail Plain (26.8892°S 150.8670°E)
- Renbah (26.8176°S 150.8102°E)
- Riverlea (26.9619°S 150.8472°E)
- Shamrock Flat (26.8143°S 150.8274°E)
- The Shiralee (26.8791°S 150.7991°E)
- Wandella (26.8021°S 150.8201°E)
- Warra Warra (26.9426°S 150.8766°E)

== Education ==
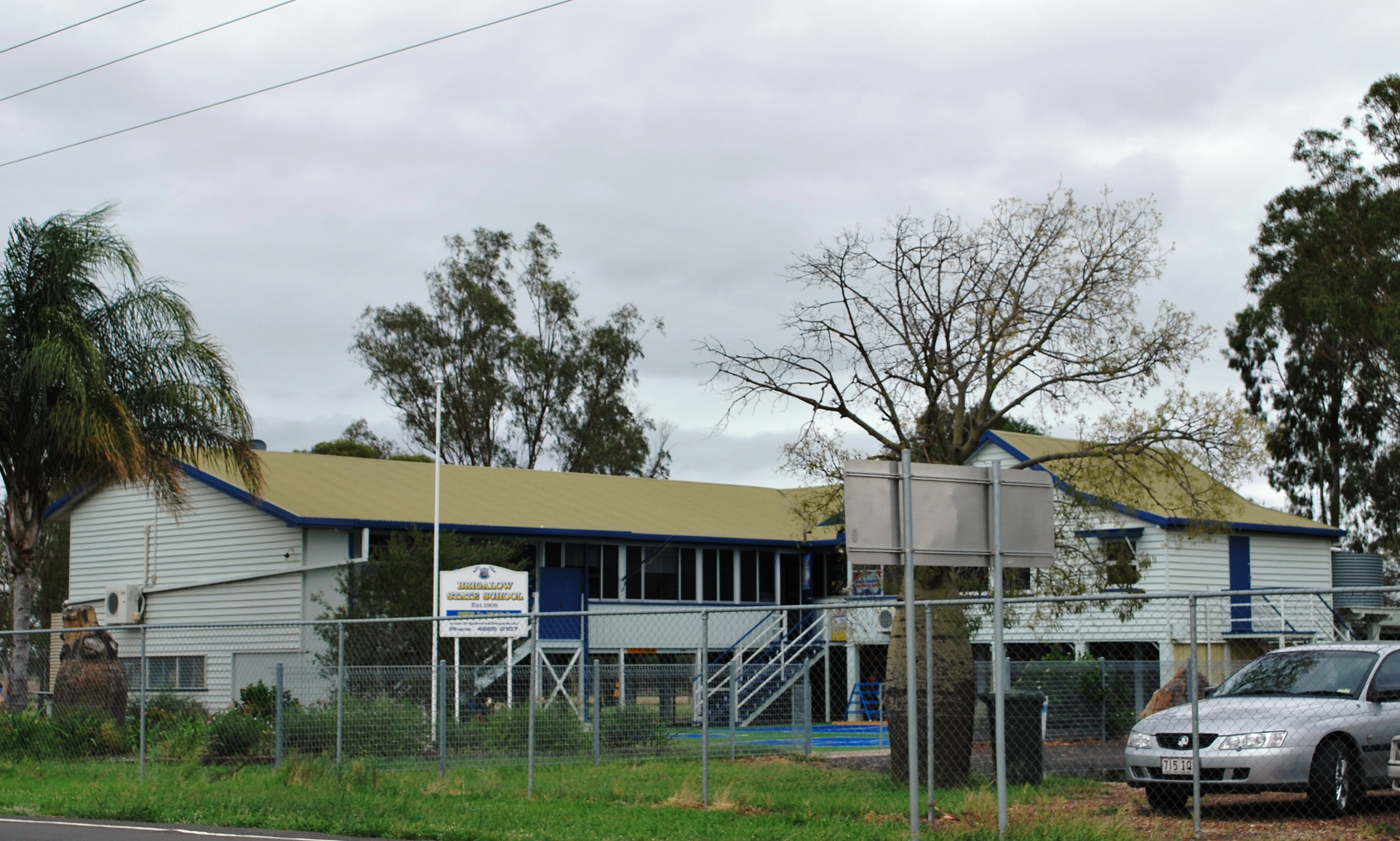
Brigalow State School

Brigalow State School is a government primary (Prep–6) school for boys and girls on the southern side of the Warrego Highway (26.8364°S 150.7792°E). In 2018, the school had an enrolment of 52 students with 5 teachers (4 full-time equivalent) and 7 non-teaching staff (3 full-time equivalent).

There is no secondary school in Brigalow. The nearest government secondary schools are Chinchilla State High School (to Year 12) in Chinchilla to the north-west and Jandowae State School (to Year 10) in Jandowae to the north-east.

== Amenities ==
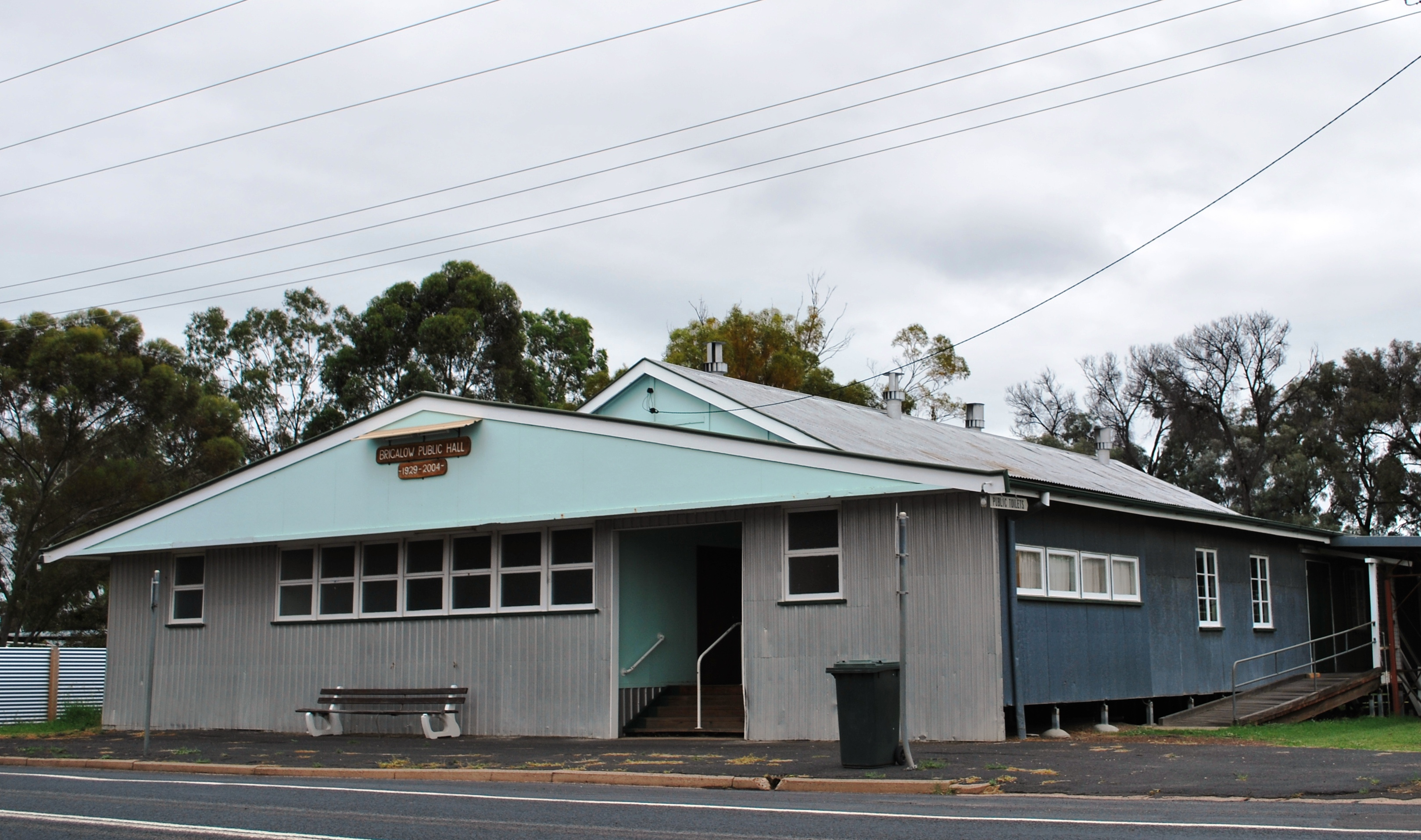
Brigalow Public Hall

Brigalow Public Hall is at 47–49 Warrego Highway (26.8434°S 150.7895°E).

Brigalow had three churches but all have now closed. The Brigalow Uniting Church (the last to close) was at 68 Mulga Street (26.8393°S 150.7852°E) and is now privately owned.
