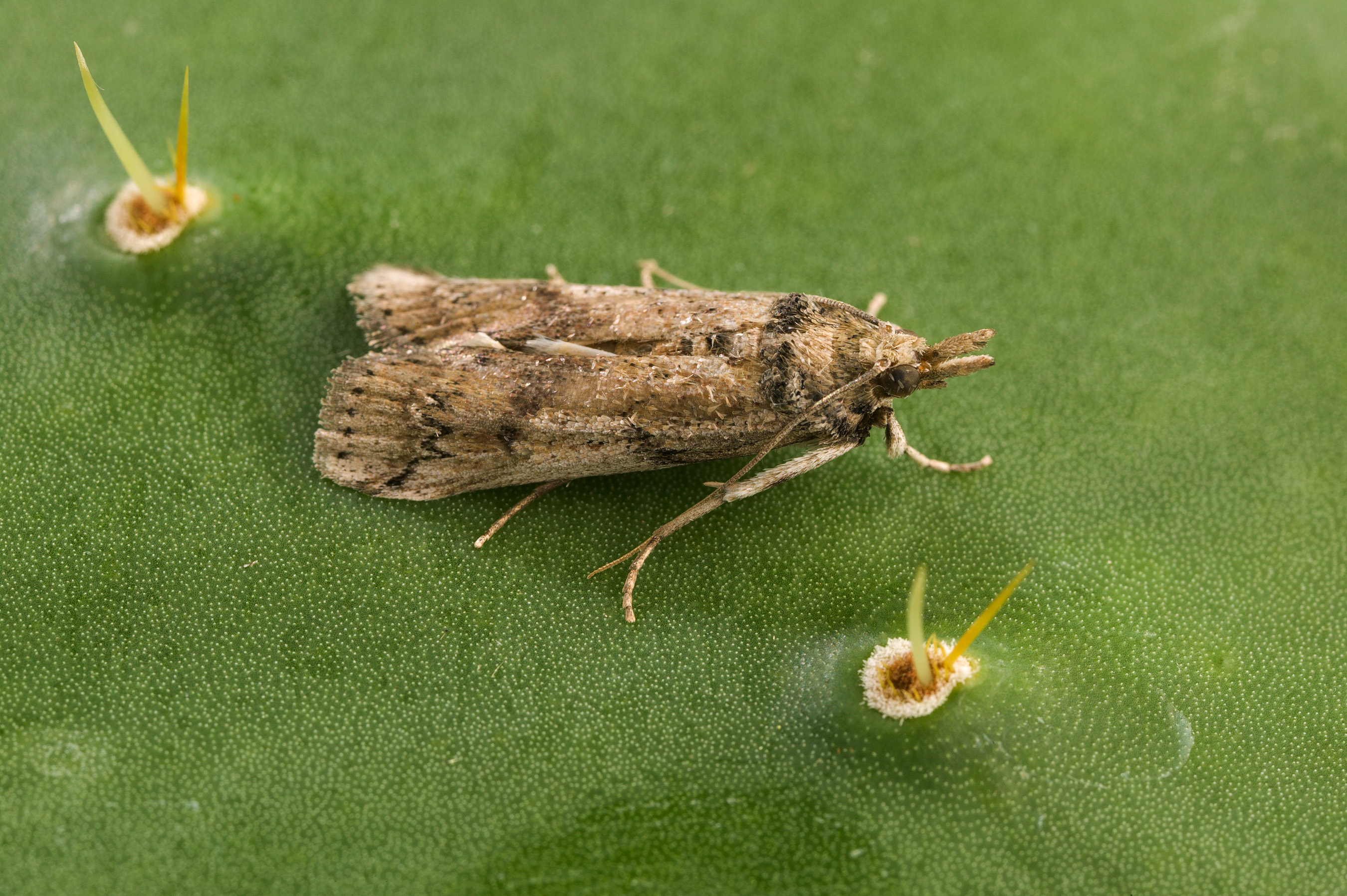
- Female moth

Scientific classification
- Kingdom: Animalia
- Phylum: Arthropoda
- Clade: Pancrustacea
- Class: Insecta
- Order: Lepidoptera
- Family: Pyralidae
- Genus: Cactoblastis
- Species: C. cactorum

Binomial name
- Cactoblastis cactorum (Berg, 1885)

Synonyms
- Zophodia cactorum Berg, 1885

= Cactoblastis cactorum =

Species of moth

Cactoblastis cactorum, the cactus moth, South American cactus moth or nopal moth, is native to Argentina, Paraguay, Uruguay and southern Brazil. It is one of five species in the genus Cactoblastis that inhabit South America, where many parasitoids, predators and pathogens control the expansion of the moths' population. This species has been introduced into many areas outside its natural range, including Australia, the Caribbean, and South Africa. In some locations, it has spread uncontrollably and was consequently classified an invasive species. However, in other places such as Australia, it has gained favor for its role in the biological control of cacti from the genus Opuntia, such as prickly pear.

== Interactions in native habitat ==
In South America, Cactoblastis cactorum has many natural predators, including ants and New World monkeys. Ants, the moths' main predators, consume its larvae. New World monkeys dig the larvae and pupae out from the flattened leaf-like stems, or "cladodes", of the cacti. The relationship between Cactoblastis cactorum and Opuntia cactus species is parasitic: the moth feeds on the host cactus. Recent work in South America has identified four genetically-structured ecotypes of C. cactorum that infest different hosts and possess different larval morphology. The mechanism driving this isolation and pattern of host-association in the field remains unexplored.

== Anatomy ==
Adults of Cactoblastis cactorum are nondescript brownish-gray moths with long legs and long antennae. The moth can be identified only by a microscopic examination of dissected male genitalia. They generally appear as typical Pyralidae, with the pronounced labial palps of the female, thus the name "snout moths".

The forewings show a characteristic banding pattern similar to other related moths. The hindwings are whitish and semitransparent, and the wingspan of adult moths varies by age and sex. The average wingspan is 27–40 mm for females, and 23–32 mm for males.

The larvae of C. cactorum are caterpillars that start out with a pink-cream color and gradually become orange, with distinctive black spots or bands.

== Reproduction and lifespan ==
Cactoblastis cactorum mating occurs before sunrise. Mates are found by scent rather than sight. Once a female finds a mate, she begins to release sex pheromones that signal to males her readiness. When the male responds, the mating process is initiated.

The initial process of mating begins when the female and male attach themselves at their abdomens. The male passes a sac, known as the "spermatophore", and the female stores the sac in her abdomen's reproductive center. After an incubation period, the female deposits an "egg stick" that contains 30–50 eggs. The eggs are laid on either the tip of the cactus spine, the cactus leaf, the cladode, or the cactus fruit.

Egg sticks that resemble cactus spines develop and hatch in 25–30 days. The gregarious larvae bore into the cactus pad through a single entry hole by chewing through the tough outer cuticle of the cladode. The external damage that results is characterized by yellowed plant tissue with plant fluid ooze and insect frass. The larvae feed inside the cactus and eventually hollow out the cactus pad, consuming everything but the vascular tissues.

Larvae will typically spend two months within the host cactus during the summer, and approximately four months during the winter. Mature larvae exit the cactus pad to form cocoons. They pupate under debris on the ground at the base of the plant. As soon as the moths emerge, they search for a mate, and usually reproduce three to four times within their lifetime. The average longevity is nine days for females and eleven days for males. During this time, the female moth does not eat; she uses all of her energy to travel up to 10 kilometres (6 mi) in search of dense cactus patches for reproduction. The male moth devotes his energy to maximizing his mating opportunities. Males mate between two and five times, and wait two to three days on average between mating events.

== Effects and status ==
=== As a biological control agent ===
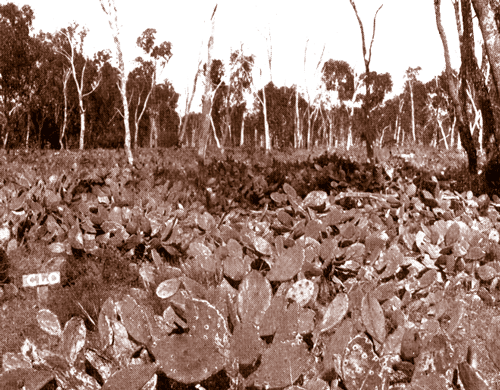
An Opuntia infested area in Australia, before Cactoblastis was introduced

Cactoblastis cactorum was introduced in 1925 to Australia, where it was successfully used as a biological control agent for Opuntia cacti. Due to this success, it was subsequently introduced into other countries, including South Africa in 1933 and the Caribbean in the 1950s.

Following introduction, Cactoblastis exerted an immediate effect on the agricultural community in South Africa, where it diminished the population of the spineless Opuntia species valued as cattle fodder. In 1956, the moth was introduced to the Caribbean island of Nevis and successfully controlled a complex of native "prickly pear" cacti. In 1960 Cactoblastis was introduced into Montserrat and Antigua as a successful biological control agent.

=== Spread ===
Following its introduction into the Caribbean, Cactoblastis cactorum was able to spread across the Atlantic Ocean and throughout the Caribbean through an unknown mix of natural dispersal, intentional and unintentional human transport, and importation on infested livestock fodder. It has been spotted in Saint Kitts, the US Virgin Islands, Haiti, Cuba, the Dominican Republic, the Bahamas, the Cayman Islands, Puerto Rico and Barbados.

It eventually reached the Southeastern United States and was first detected in Florida in 1989. Cactoblastis cactorum likely entered Florida through importation of Opuntia from the Dominican Republic. It is estimated that Cactoblastis is currently expanding its range along both the Gulf and Atlantic coasts at a rate of 100 miles per year, with a constant increase in the rate of colonization along the Gulf Coast. As it spreads, it threatens the population of Opuntia cacti in Florida, in the Atlantic coast up to Charleston, South Carolina, and around the Gulf Coast up to New Orleans.

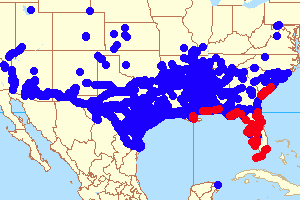
Cactoblastis distribution in the United States: Prickly pear habitat Cactus moth habitat

As the moth moves through the Southeastern United States, it endangers many cactus species and threatens many ecosystems. In Florida, the greatest concern is for the critically endangered semaphore cactus Consolea corallicola. Studies aim to identify the most efficient way to prevent the invasion of Cactoblastis cactorum in the semaphore cactus population. In addition to the semaphore cactus, the arrival of Cactoblastis cactorum to the United States caused concern for the ornamental cactus industry in Arizona, California, Nevada, New Mexico and Texas. Arizona has the largest economic stake in Cactoblastis; the retail value of its cactus industry is around $9.5 million.

Cactoblastis cactorum has spread across the Gulf to Mexico, where it was first discovered on Isla Mujeres, a small island off the northeast coast of the Yucatán Peninsula. It is unknown how the moth migrated to Mexico; speculated means of propagation include winds and hurricanes, unintentional transport by humans, or commercial trade. Cactoblastis cactorum began to attack Opuntia cacti on San Salvador Island in the Bahamas, where Opuntia cacti, especially the prickly pear cactus, are a major food source for the Cyclura iguanas. The decrease in Opuntia cacti population raises concern of severe damage to the iguana population.

In 2020 a study found that C. cactorum is unselective as to which Opuntia species it chooses to feed upon. This may result in even more widespread devastation than previously expected.

=== Projected spread ===
Researchers are projecting a westward expansion of Cactoblastis cactorum in North America. This threatens cactus industries in the Southwestern United States and inner parts of Mexico. In the Western United States, over sixty Opuntia species are a vital part of the ecosystem. In Mexico, Opuntia is a vital plant; its fruit and pads (nopal) are a staple food, chopped cacti are used to sustain cattle in times of drought, and some Opuntia species support the cochineal dye industry. Loss of these cacti would have a major environmental and economical impact on the country. Estimated stress factors in the moths' native community indicate that it is restricted to temperate climates, due to the incubation period of its larvae, but host associations may also play an important role in determining spread. Models based on environmental tolerances predict that its eventual range limits in the United States are bound by Charleston, South Carolina, to the north and by California to the west. However, the eventual extent of the western spread remains unclear because little is known about biotic interactions that will occur in this region.

== Ecological interactions and mechanisms ==
=== Host selection ===
The ecological relationship between the Cactoblastis cactorum moth and the Opuntia cactus is a parasite–host relationship.

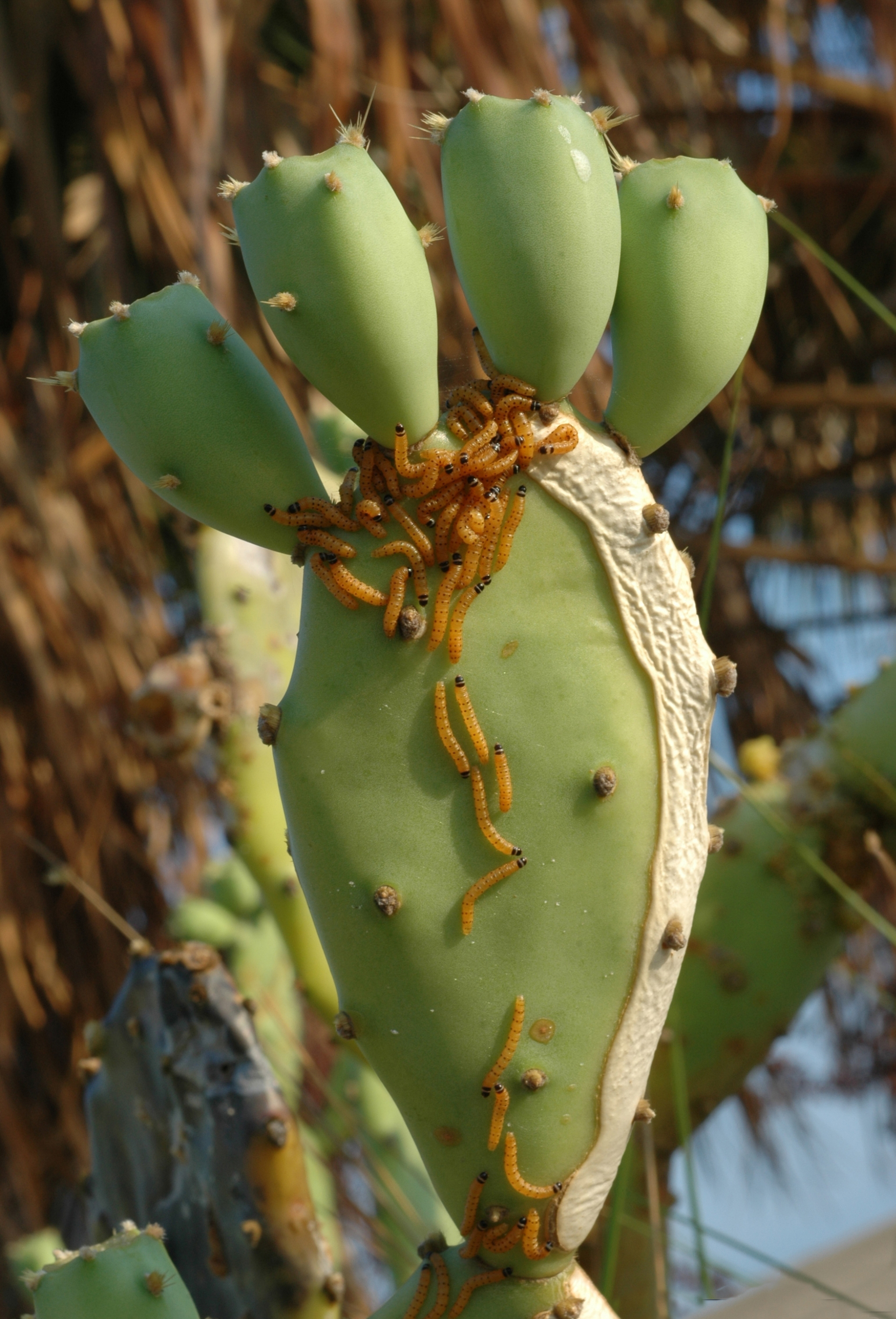
Cactoblastis larvae feeding on Opuntia cacti

Laboratory feeding studies suggest that Cactoblastis cactorum is one of the least selective moths in the genus Cactoblastis when it comes to host selection, but the observed patterns of infestation in the field suggest that host identity is important in determining which sites become infested. Moths target specific plant hosts, like Opuntia, using chemoreceptors on their antennae. Compared to male moths, females respond more strongly to volatile organic compounds emitted by the cacti, allowing them to best determine where to oviposit.

=== Competition ===
There have been no formal studies of competition between C. cactorum and other cactophagous species to date. This could be an area of potential interest in the Southwestern United States and Mexico, as there is not much information of the diversity of cactophagous insects found in the region that could influence the spread of C. cactorum.

=== Predation ===
Another factor that allows the moth to spread so easily in the United States is lack of predation. In South America, several parasitoid species as well as many diseases help to control the spread of the moth and its larvae. The parasitoids and diseases seem to be enough to control the spread of Cactoblastis cactorum. These parasitoids and diseases are not present in the areas where the moth has become a problem. This may be allowing the moth to spread more rapidly than normal. It has yet to be determined if these organisms that limit the growth of the Cactoblastis are host-specific enough to be introduced into affected areas as a method of biological control of the moth itself.

=== Life history strategy ===
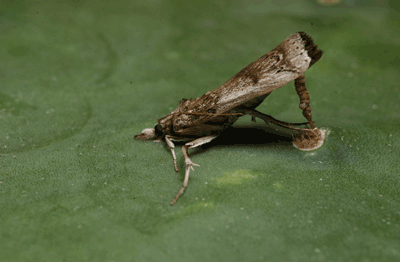
Adult female moth in the process of laying an egg stick on a cladode.

Cactoblastis cactorum shows both r-selected and k-selected life history traits. Although the moth reproduces more than once in its lifetime (a more k-selected trait), it produces a large number of eggs at one time (a more r-selected trait). A female moth can lay up to 50 eggs per generation, and produce at least three generations. Multiple generations are a sign of iteroparous reproduction. However, large amounts of offspring during a single generation time is a trait of semelparous reproduction. In this particular case, the moth also has high adult mortality rates which tend to push organisms towards semelparous reproduction. Also, these generations occur over a short period of time, considering that an adult moth only lives for about nine days.

There are many different combinations and gradients between semelparity and iteroparity. However, it is clear in this case that the moth is closer to the semelparous side of the scale. Semelparity is an r-selected trait, whereas iteroparity is a k-selected trait. Other r-selected traits that the moth exhibits besides large breeds of offspring and short life span are: a small body structure, low adult investment in rearing offspring, and high dispersal ability. This shows that the moth is much more r-selected than it is k-selected. Most invasive species tend to be r-selected individuals because of their high growth rate and dispersal ability.

== Control options ==
Many attempts are being made to halt the expansion of Cactoblastis cactorum in order to prevent further damage to Opuntia cacti across Central America and the Southeast United States, where the effect of the moth has been identified as the most dangerous to the native flora. Some attempts to control the population are biological in nature whereas others are more physical attempts to quarantine afflicted Opuntia.

=== Bacterial control ===
One option currently being explored is a bacterium, Bacillus thuringiensis, which would kill middle-aged larvae of Cactoblastis cactorum. The bacterium was discovered by a group of scientists working in a colonization facility in Tifton, Georgia, who were attempting to rear large colonies of the moth. In their efforts to produce a sterile variety of the moth to eradicate it from its introduced habitat, a unique strain of bacterium was discovered. A particularly virulent variety of the bacterium was cultured that killed 100% of developing Cactoblastis cactorum larvae. This bacterium, when raised with the developing moth larvae, caused 100% mortality due to a combination of excreted exotoxins. The primary lethal exotoxin found in the guts of Cactoblastis cactorum after being exposed to Bacillus thuringiensis is referred to commonly as BtCc. It is being explored as short-term pest suppression because the bacterium is currently unable to be transferred from generation to generation in the gut of the moth. BtCc disrupts the digestive process of the larvae and causes near immediate larvae death. In order for this to be a long-term solution to control the spread of Cactoblastis cactorum, the bacterium or exotoxin would have to be able to reproduce and sporulate within the moth for its effects to spread in the population.

=== Wasp predator control ===
Some researchers are also looking at using a parasitic wasp to curb the spread of Cactoblastis cactorum in the United States. These wasps, native to South America, lay their eggs in Cactoblastis larvae and eat the larvae from the inside out. Current concerns are that the wasp itself could become an invasive species, parasitizing native caterpillars and other native insect larvae.

=== Ant interaction control ===
Another possible control option being explored would utilize ants to serve in a mutually beneficial relationship with the Opuntia cacti. Many ant species in the natural world participate in mutualistic relationships with various species of cactus and it is hoped that this general trend of interaction can be exploited to protect the Opuntia cacti from the Cactoblastis moth. This relationship would offer Opuntia protection from the invader, Cactoblastis, and would offer the ants a place to rear their young and receive nourishment. In South Africa, a mutualism already exists between many species of cacti and ants to prevent the spread of Cactoblastis. Many cactus species throughout the world excrete an extrafloral nectar (ENF) that initially attracts the ants. The ants then feed on this nectar and attack anything that disturbs the cacti.

Researchers at Rice University in Houston and the Florida A&M University are collaborating in their research to explore such a beneficial relationship that could be reproduced in the United States. Initial lab experiments showed that the presence of ants living together with the cacti increased the mortality of Cactoblastis eggs laid on the cacti.

=== Quarantine in the United States ===
Currently in the United States, most populations of Cactoblastis cactorum have been discovered in Florida, Georgia, and most recently, in Louisiana. Many of these states have already begun their own programs to halt the progress of the moth in conjunction with the 2009 Strategic Plan.

The United States began a plan in 2009 through the Animal and Plant Health Inspection Service (APHIS) to quarantine afflicted Opuntia species and slow the migration of Cactoblastis cactorum across the United States. The APHIS hopes to create a permanent barrier across which colonization of the invasive moth would be impossible. This barrier includes not only colonization of new areas across land, but also by sea. By sea, new regulations by APHIS require livestock fodder in transit found with evidence of Cactoblastis cactorum to be destroyed, fumigated, or returned to its country of origin. By land, quarantining means creating a barrier of area over which the moth will be unable to reproduce across the gap; this has been accomplished by physically removing all cacti in swaths of area or by removing and replacing afflicted cacti.

One of the primary implementations proposed would be to create a sterile version of Cactoblastis cactorum that would serve to eliminate the westernmost population of the moth and push its current territory eastward. This method would create a generation of moths which is unable to reproduce and would slowly but effectively curb the spread of the species. However, the sterile version of the moth has had little success in spreading to the majority of the affected area.

Other methods include identifying infected areas and then mechanically destroying all cacti in that area. Crude methods such as these are being used in Louisiana to eliminate the presence of the moth in swampy areas and generally involve the heavy use of removal by chainsaw, hacksaw, or other mechanical chopping device. Chemical pesticides in most areas have proven to be ineffective due to the large quantity and frequency of treatment of pesticide needed to limit the population and also the effective protection the moth is allotted by the cactus leaves.

== Uncertainties ==
There is still much to be learned about Cactoblastis cactorum. Its native habitat of South America remains a mostly-unexplored area of scientific research. The moths' interactions with other species are not well understood. Although it is well known that the moth is capable of switching hosts, the full range of host plants susceptible to the moth is unknown. How the moth will affect agriculture in North America will be seen in the next few years, and the effectiveness of many of the control tactics may be seen in even less time. Lastly, a big unknown in the study of Cactoblastis cactorum is how various Opuntia species may develop defenses in response to its invasion. More studies need to be done both to understand the biological mechanisms of the moth and to halt its spread as an invasive species.

== Queensland monuments and memorials ==
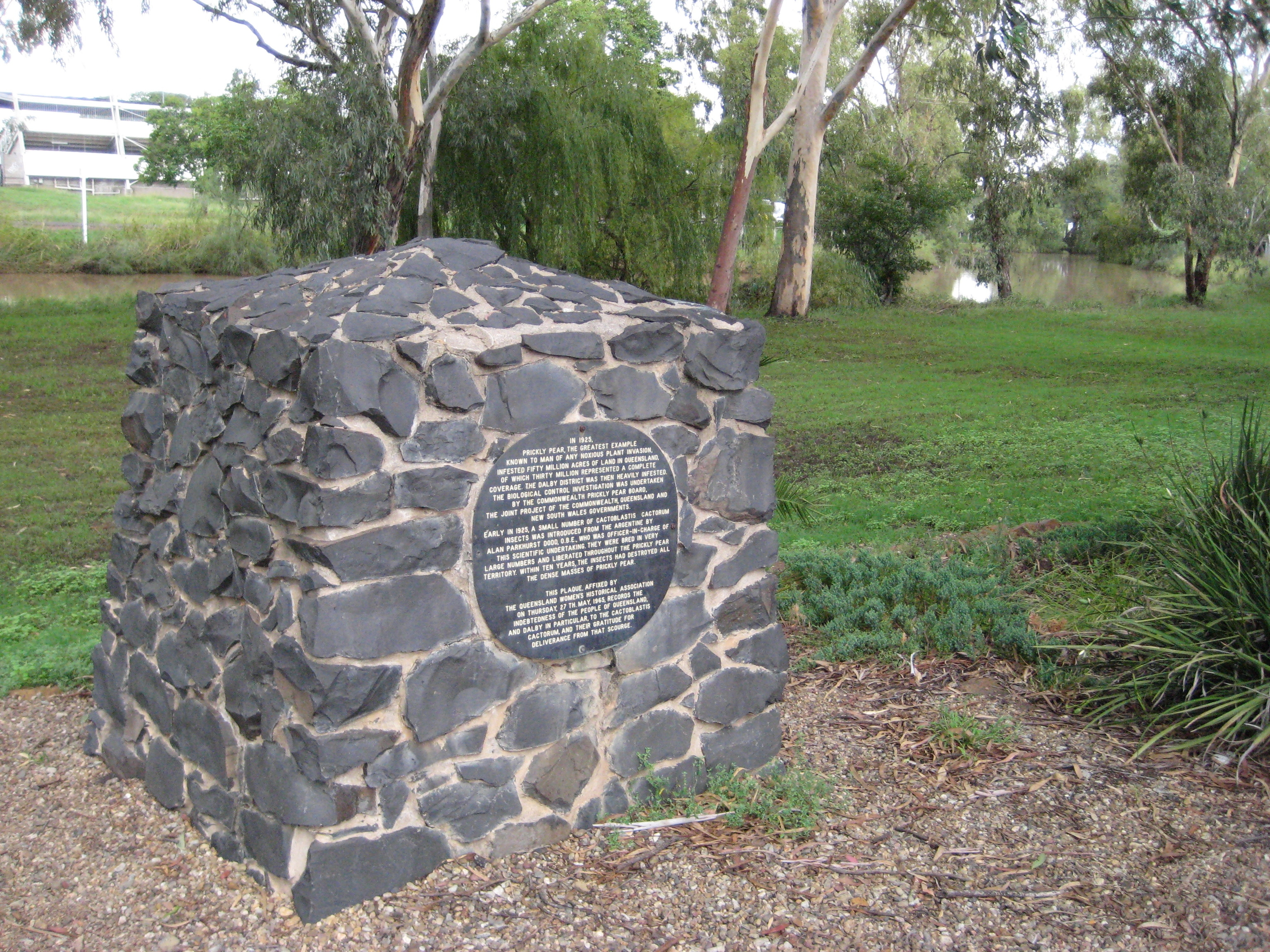
Monument to the Cactoblastis cactorum moth in Dalby, Queensland, Australia

There is a monument commemorating eradication of Opuntia by the moth in a park by Myall Creek, in Dalby, Queensland, Australia. (27.1832°S 151.2665°E). It was erected on the Queensland Women's Historical Association on Thursday 27 May 1965.

The Cactoblastis Memorial Hall is located at Boonarga, 10 kilometres (6 mi) east of Chinchilla in Queensland (26.7953°S 150.7154°E) and purports to be "the only building dedicated to an insect." It was erected in 1936, and was one of the first insect memorials ever built, following the 1919 Boll Weevil Monument in Alabama.
