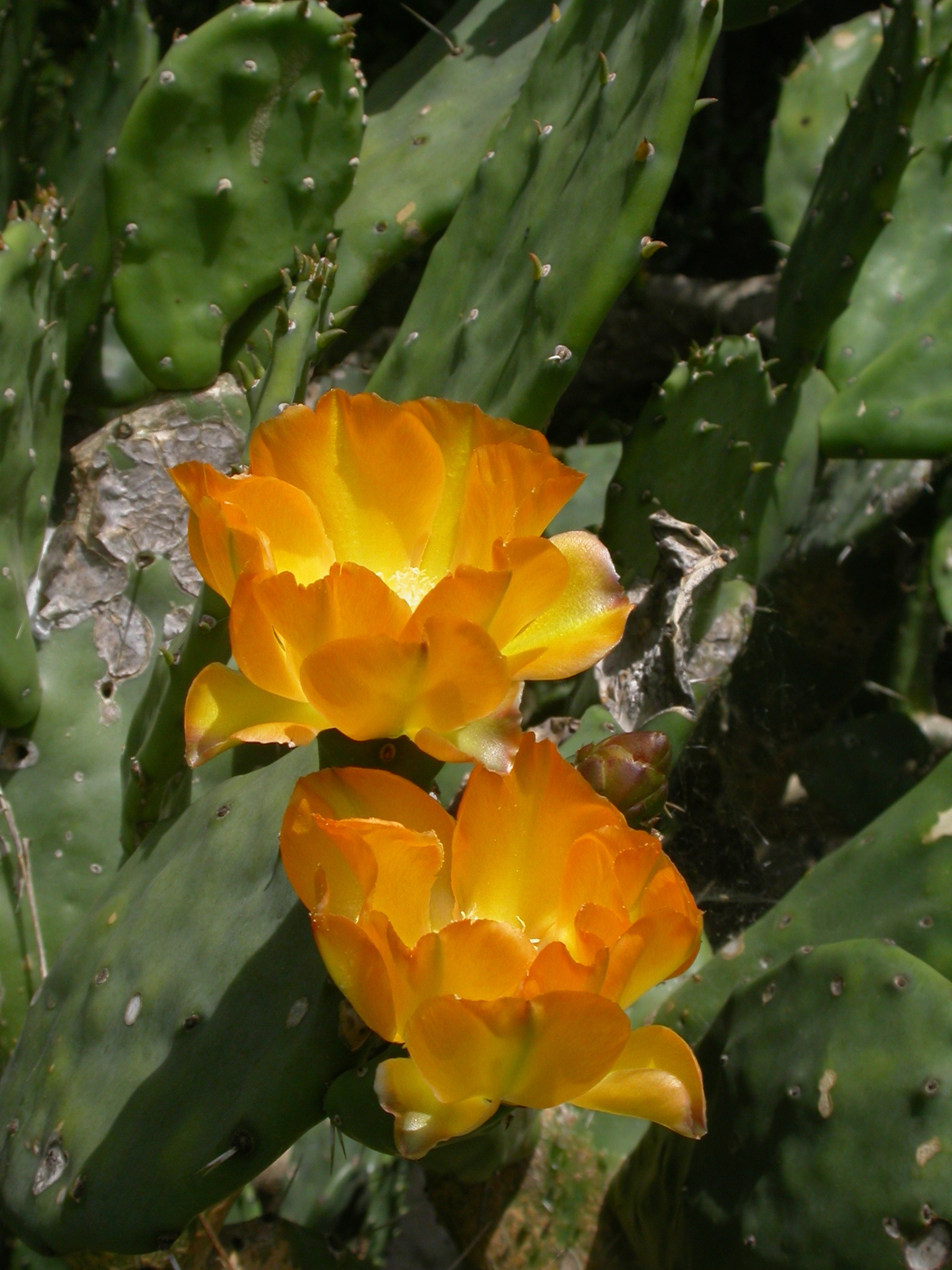

Conservation status
- Least Concern (IUCN 3.1)

Scientific classification
- Kingdom: Plantae
- Clade: Tracheophytes
- Clade: Angiosperms
- Clade: Eudicots
- Order: Caryophyllales
- Family: Cactaceae
- Genus: Opuntia
- Species: O. elata

Binomial name
- Opuntia elata Link & Otto ex Salm-Dyck

= Opuntia elata =

Species of cactus

Opuntia elata is a species of cactus found in Bolivia, Paraguay, southern Brazil, northern Argentina, and Uruguay.

== Description ==
Opuntia elata is a fast growing Opuntia with a tendency to branch out. It can reach up to 1-1.5 m in height and spread (occasionally 3 m). The joints may grow straight, white spines up to 3-4 cm long.

The flower is orange to yellow in color, appearing around late spring up to summer. The fruit is club shaped and purple-red when ripe.

=== Varieties ===
As of October 2022, Plants of the World Online accepted three varieties:

- Opuntia elata var. delaetiana F.A.C.Weber
- Opuntia elata var. elata – synonym Opuntia anacantha
- Opuntia elata var. obovata E.Walther

== Distribution and habitat ==
The plant can be found at Chuquisaca, Cochabamba, Santa Cruz, Tarija of Bolivia. They can also be found growing at Cuba.
