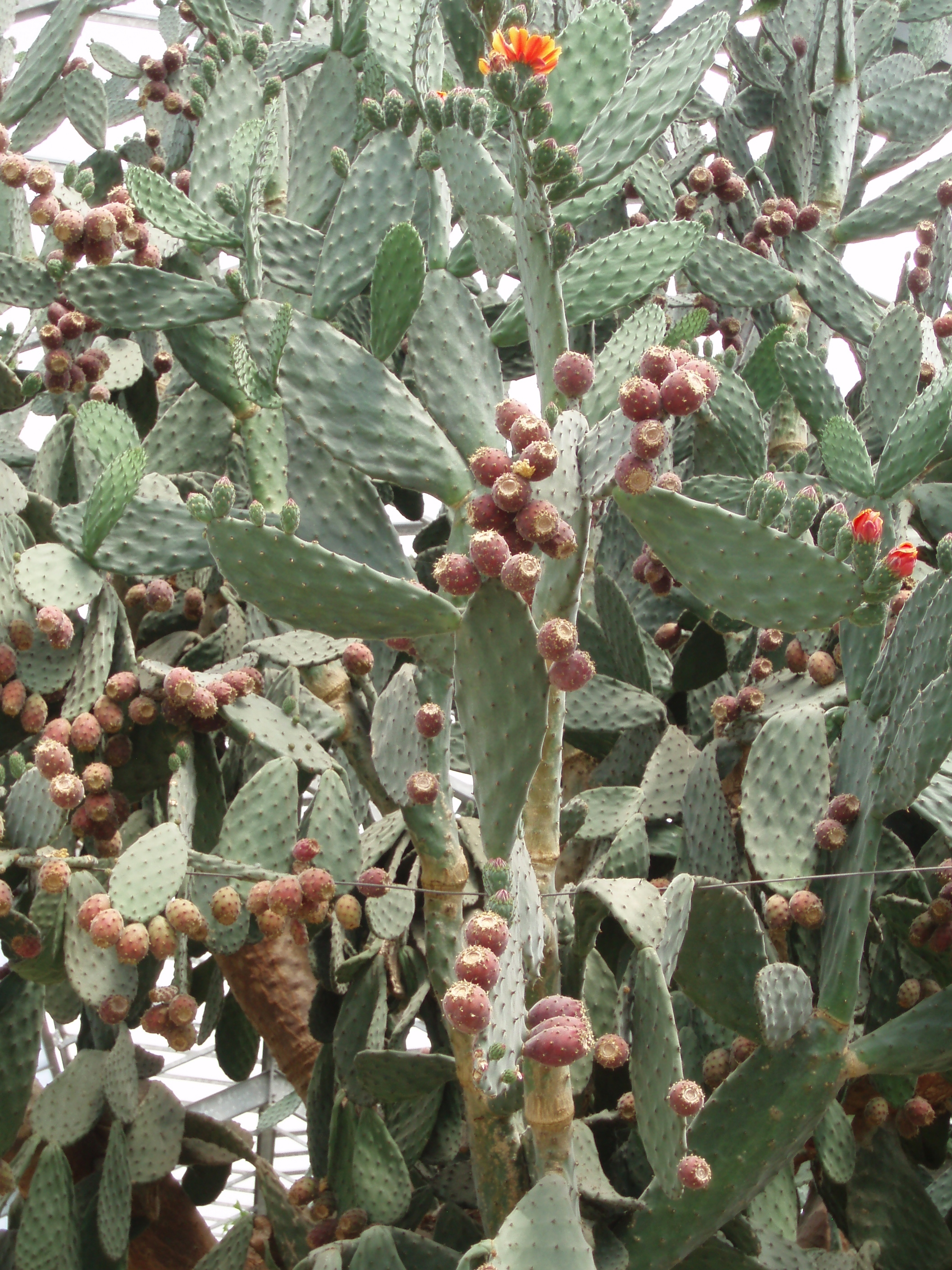

Conservation status
- Least Concern (IUCN 3.1)

Scientific classification
- Kingdom: Plantae
- Clade: Tracheophytes
- Clade: Angiosperms
- Clade: Eudicots
- Order: Caryophyllales
- Family: Cactaceae
- Genus: Opuntia
- Species: O. tomentosa

Binomial name
- Opuntia tomentosa Salm-Dyck

Synonyms
- Opuntia hernandezii DC.; Opuntia icterica Griffiths; Opuntia macdougaliana Rose; Opuntia oblongata Wendland; Opuntia sarca Griffiths ex Scheinvar; Opuntia tomentosa var. hernandezii (DC.) Bravo; Opuntia tomentosa var. herrerae Scheinvar; Opuntia velutina var. macdougaliana (Rose) Bravo

= Opuntia tomentosa =

Species of cactus

Opuntia tomentosa, commonly called woollyjoint pricklypear or velvety tree pear, is a species of Opuntia found in Mexico
