= Cactoblastis Memorial Hall =

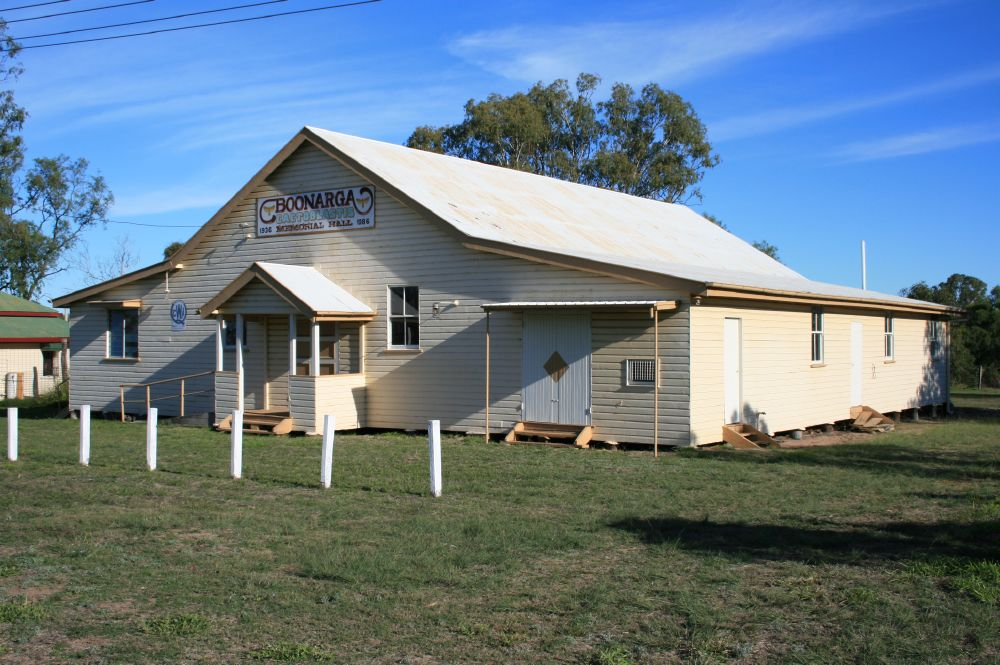
- Cactoblastis Memorial Hall, 2006

- Location within Queensland Location within Australia
- 26.7953°S 150.7154°E
- Location: Warrego Highway, Boonarga, Western Downs Region, Queensland, Australia

History
- Design period: 1919 – 1930s (interwar period)
- Built: 1936

Queensland Heritage Register
- Official name: Cactoblastis Memorial Hall
- Type: state heritage (built)
- Designated: 21 September 1993
- Reference no.: 601273
- Significant period: 1936, 1963 (historical, fabric); 1936– (social)
- Significant components: memorial – hall
- Builders: Jack Schloss

Cactoblastis Memorial Hall is a heritage-listed memorial at Warrego Highway, Boonarga, Western Downs Region, Queensland, Australia. It was built in 1936 by Jack Schloss. It was added to the Queensland Heritage Register on 21 September 1993.

== History ==
This timber hall was completed in 1936 at Boonarga, a small settlement approximately 12 kilometres (7.5 mi) southeast of Chinchilla. The hall was erected as a monument to the cactoblastis moth which overcame prickly pear in Queensland and New South Wales during the late 1920s and early 1930s.

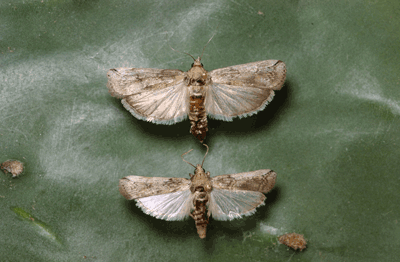
Cactoblastic moth

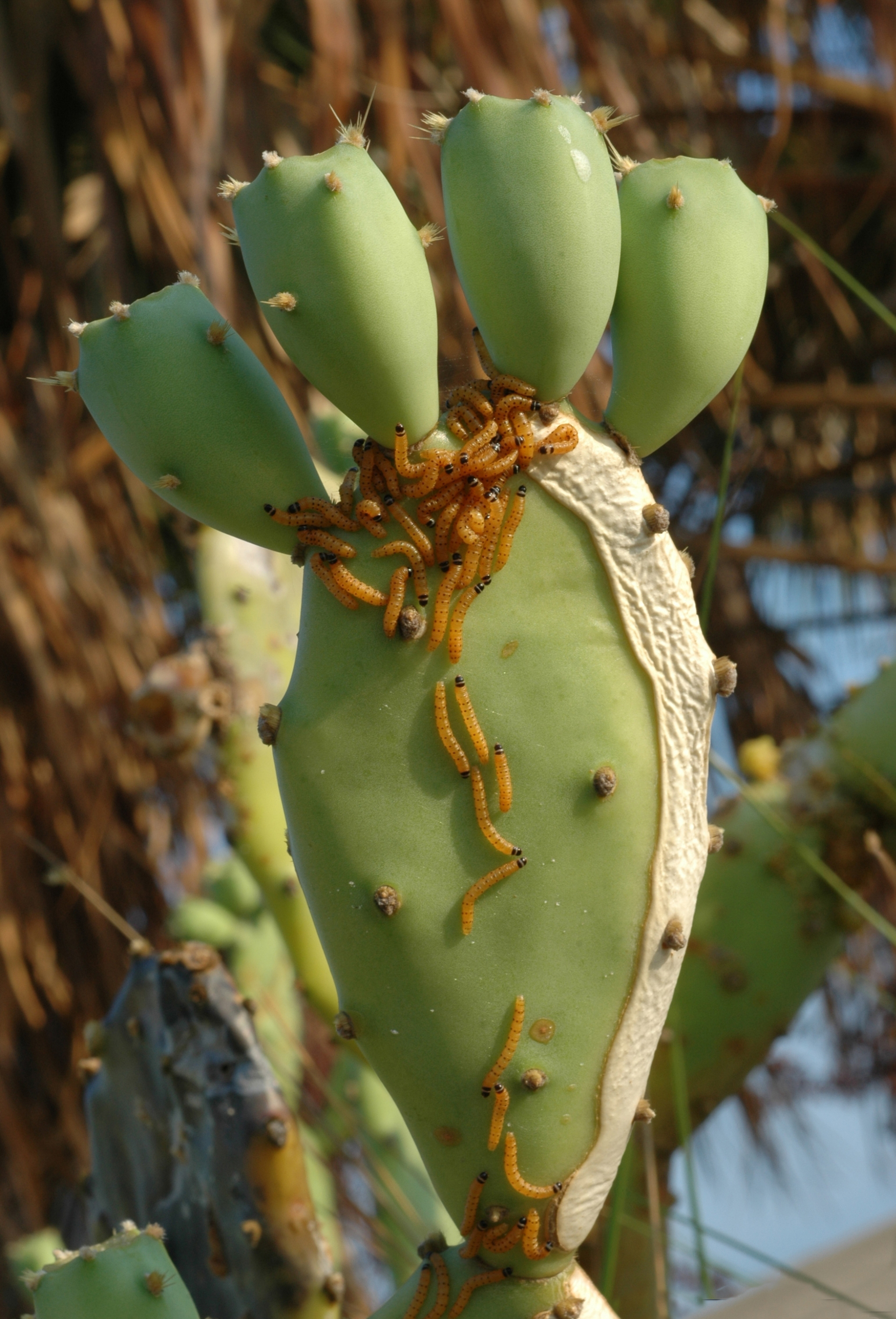
Cactoblastis larvae feeding on the prickly pear

The appearance of prickly pear in Queensland has been attributed to a small number of prickly pear plants brought to Queensland c. 1843 as garden plants. By 1862 prickly pear was growing in the Chinchilla district and spread rapidly in areas where land holdings were extensive and population relatively low.

Prickly pear was declared a noxious weed in Queensland in 1893. By 1900 approximately 10,000,000 acres (4,000,000 ha) were affected by prickly pear; an area which had extended to an estimated 58,000,000 acres (23,000,000 ha) by 1920. About half of this area was so densely covered by prickly pear that the land was useless for production. The costs of mechanical and chemical methods of eradication exceeded the value of the land and therefore did not prove economically viable for controlling the spread of prickly pear.

In 1912, the Queensland government established an experimental station in the heart of prickly pear country at Dulacca under the direction of a full-time scientist. The biologist chosen to establish and run this experimental station was Dr. Jean White-Haney. These investigations were regarded as "a great experiment in scientific research"; an experiment which was considered almost unique at this time. The progress of these investigations was followed by the international scientific community.

In 1925, 3000 cactoblastis eggs were imported from South America. These eggs were divided between the Sherwood laboratory, and the Chinchilla Field Station which had been established in 1923 as one of four Queensland field stations responsible for rearing and distributing insect supplies. The first prickly pear plant was destroyed by the cactoblastis moth at Chinchilla in September 1926. The last extensive area of prickly pear in Queensland was destroyed in 1933, and the Chinchilla Field Station was closed at the end of 1936.

The Chinchilla district was one of many areas which experienced renewed prosperity as land cleared of prickly pear was utilised for agriculture and dairying pursuits.

Proposals to erect a hall at Boonarga were first discussed in July 1934, at which time a public meeting was held and a Hall Committee appointed. Land for the proposed hall was donated by Mrs Fahey, a resident of Boonarga. In October 1934 the Committee decided to name the hall the Boonarga Cactoblastis Memorial Hall in honour of the cactoblastis moth. Finance for the hall was arranged through the Bank of New South Wales in Chinchilla with a number of Boonarga residents acting as guarantors.

Tenders for the erection of the hall were called by the Committee in June 1935. Although a tender was recommended for acceptance, tenders were reinvited in July 1935. The hall was built by local builder Mr Jack Schloss, at a cost of £435 and opened in February 1936 by Godfrey Morgan, Member of the Queensland Legislative Assembly. A gala ball was held to mark the occasion.

Alterations to the hall in 1963 included the addition of the second aisle on the southeastern side of the hall. A new dance floor was laid c. 1985. The hall is presently used as a venue for dances, meetings and other functions.

== Description ==
A single-storeyed timber building set on low timber stumps with a pitched galvanised corrugated iron roof the Cactoblastis Hall is situated on the southwestern side of the Warrego Highway 12 kilometres (7.5 mi) southeast of Chinchilla. Set back about 35 metres (115 ft) from the highway the building, approximately square in plan, consists of a central dance room with adjoining aisles on the southeastern and northwestern sides. The dance room has a simple gable roof which changes pitch to form shallower skillion roofs over the aisles.

The building is clad in weatherboards and has timber doors and a variety of windows, the originals being double hung sashes. Most of the more recent openings are fitted with glass or metal louvres. On the rear elevation is a junction in the weatherboards indicating the later addition of the southeastern aisle. Windows and possibly some of the weatherboards from the earlier southeastern wall have been reused in the addition.

The main entry doors, located in the centre of the front facade, are protected by a timber-framed gable-roofed porch with a weatherboard balustrade. A ramp has been added to the southeastern side of the porch. Above the doors, below the ridge of the roof, is hung a large sign bearing the name of the town, the hall and the date of construction which replaced the original sign. A sign to the east of these doors acknowledges the hall as a venue for meetings of the Queensland Country Women's Association. Double hung sash windows flank these timber panelled double doors.

On the northwestern side of the front facade double timber doors under a slender steel framed flat roofed porch have replaced a double hung sash window. Timber doors are also located on the side and rear facades.

The central space has an unlined roof, a timber dance floor, recently renewed, and a stage which is located at the southwestern end. A steel truss has replaced the original partition walls and swing doors between the dance room and the northwestern aisle. A large opening between the supper room in the southeastern aisle and the dance room is infilled with lattice. The ticket office is located in the northern corner, a kitchen in the eastern corner and toilets in the western corner of the building.

== Heritage listing ==
Cactoblastis Memorial Hall was listed on the Queensland Heritage Register on 21 September 1993 having satisfied the following criteria.

The place is important in demonstrating the evolution or pattern of Queensland's history.

As a hall erected to commemorate a significant scientific and economic event (the successful control of prickly pear by the cactoblastis moth), the Cactoblastis Memorial Hall at Boonarga is important in demonstrating the pattern of Queensland's history.

The place demonstrates rare, uncommon or endangered aspects of Queensland's cultural heritage.

It demonstrates a rare aspect of Queensland's cultural heritage as the only known building dedicated to an insect.

The place is important in demonstrating the principal characteristics of a particular class of cultural places.

It demonstrates the principal characteristics of a timber hall built to service a small rural community.

The place has a strong or special association with a particular community or cultural group for social, cultural or spiritual reasons.

As a hall in continuous use since 1936, the place has a strong and special association with the Boonarga community.
