= Boonarga, Queensland =

Boonarga
- Suburb
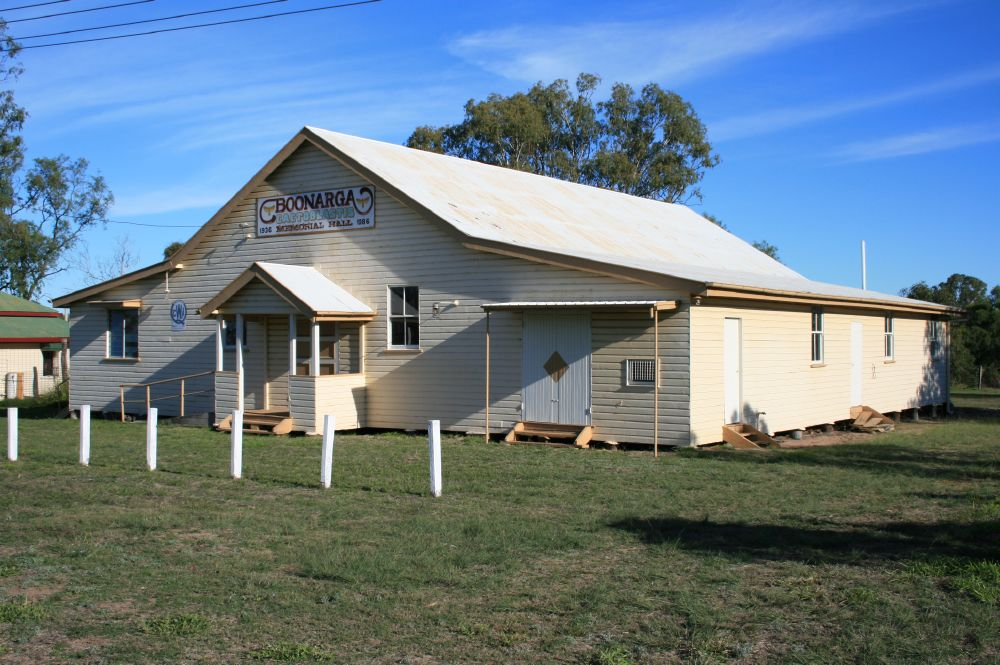
- Cactoblastis Memorial Hall, Boonarga, 2006

- Interactive map of Boonarga
- Coordinates: 26.8094°S 150.7202°E
- Country: Australia
- State: Queensland
- LGA: Western Downs Region
- Location: 19.9 km (12.4 mi) SE of Chinchilla; 77.4 km (48.1 mi) NW of Dalby; 144 km (89 mi) NW of Toowoomba; 272 km (169 mi) WNW of Brisbane

Government
  - State electorate: Callide
  - Federal division: Maranoa

Area
  - Total: 57.6 km^{2} (22.2 sq mi)

Population
  - Total: 37 (2021 census)
  - Density: 0.642/km^{2} (1.664/sq mi)
- Time zone: UTC+10:00 (AEST)
- Postcode: 4413
Suburbs around Boonarga
Chinchilla	Chances Plain	Brigalow
Hopeland	Boonarga	Brigalow
Hopeland	Hopeland	Brigalow

Boonarga is a rural locality in the Western Downs Region, Queensland, Australia. In the 2021 census, Boonarga had a population of 37 people.

== Geography ==
The Warrego Highway and Western railway line enter the locality from the south-east (Brigalow) and exit to the north-west (Chinchilla).

Boonarga railway station is an abandoned station on the Western railway line (26.7942°S 150.7153°E).

== History ==
Hill Top Provisional School opened on 20 March 1893. On 1 January 1909, it became Hill Top State School. From 1914 to 1915 it operated as a half-time school with Mulga State School (meaning the two schools shared a single teacher). In 1936, it was renamed Boonarga State School. It closed in June 1954. It was located on the Warrego Highway (26.7909°S 150.7075°E).

The Cactoblastis Memorial Hall was built to celebrate the eradiction of the prickly pear in the Boonarga area through the introduction of the cactoblastis moth. Prickly pear had spread so extensively through the area that it was often not possible to walk or ride through it. The hall was built by local builder Mr Jack Schloss at a cost of £435 and was officially opened in February 1936 by Godfrey Morgan, Member of the Queensland Legislative Assembly. A gala ball was held to mark the occasion.

== Demographics ==
In the 2016 census, Boonarga had a population of 36 people.

In the 2021 census, Boonarga had a population of 37 people.

== Heritage listings ==
Boonarga has a number of heritage-listed sites, including:

- Cactoblastis Memorial Hall, Warrego Highway

== Education ==
There are no schools in Boonarga. The nearest government primary schools are Brigalow State School in neighbouring Brigalow to the south-east and Chinchilla State School in neighbouring Chinchilla to the north-west. The nearest government secondary school is Chinchilla State High School in Chinchilla.

== Amenities ==
Boonarga Cactoblastis Memorial Hall is on the Warrego Highway (26.7952°S 150.7155°E).
