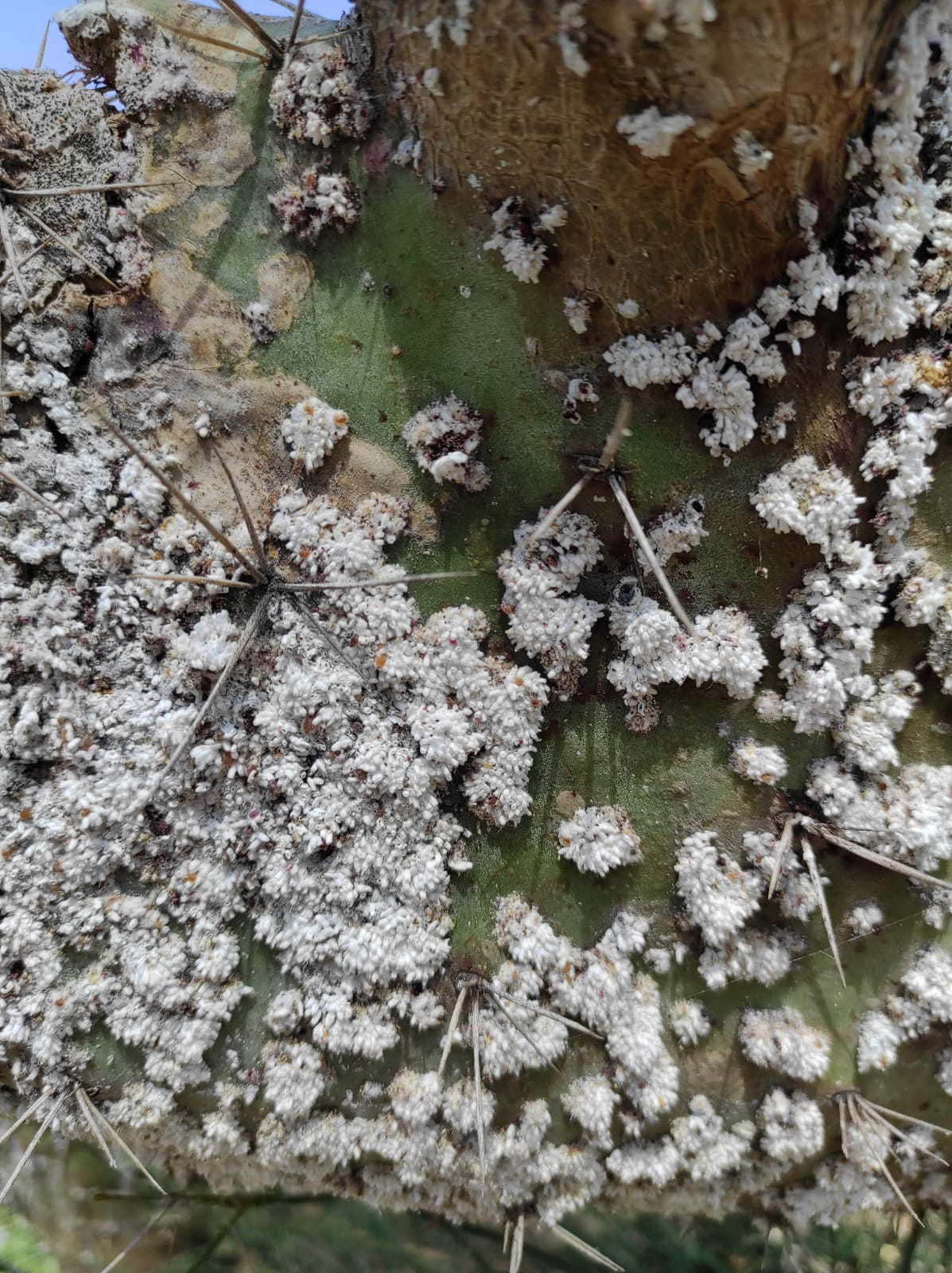
- Dactylopius coccus, a closely related species to D. opuntiae

Scientific classification
- Kingdom: Animalia
- Phylum: Arthropoda
- Class: Insecta
- Order: Hemiptera
- Suborder: Sternorrhyncha
- Family: Dactylopiidae
- Genus: Dactylopius
- Species: D. opuntiae

Binomial name
- Dactylopius opuntiae (Cockerell, 1929)

= Dactylopius opuntiae =

Species of scale insect

Dactylopius opuntiae, also known as the prickly pear cochineal, is a species of scale insect in the family Dactylopiidae.

== Taxonomy ==
Dactylopius opuntiae was first identified by Cockerell as Coccus cacti opuntiae after he collected it from cactus plants in Mexico in 1896. Later, it was considered a synonym of Dactylopius tomentosus, and workers often referred to the same species by different names or used the same name for different species. De Lotto notes that it became common practice to call Dactylopius opuntiae a distinct wild cochineal insect from Dactylopius tomentosus, even though their identity and status were never fully resolved. Eventually, in 1929, the species was classified as Dactylopius opuntiae by Cockerell.

== Description ==
All species of the family Dactylopiidae have females with an oval-shaped body that is purple-red in color and covered in a white, cotton-like wax. This wax protects the body of the cochineal from heat, cold, and predators. Adult females are sessile and form colonies of up to a few thousand individuals of mixed age, creating conspicuous clusters of white wax all over the plant. Adult females of Dactylopius opuntiae produce red glucosidal hydroxyanthrapurin (carminic acid), which occurs naturally within their body. Morphologically, all Dactylopius species have truncate dorsal setae and clusters of quinquelocular pores associated with tubular ducts on the body of females, and no microducts and cellular anal rings bearing setae. Large, truncate, and rounded setae longer than the width at the base and numerous narrow ventral pores on the last three body segments distinguish Dactylopius opuntiae from all its congeners.

=== Development ===
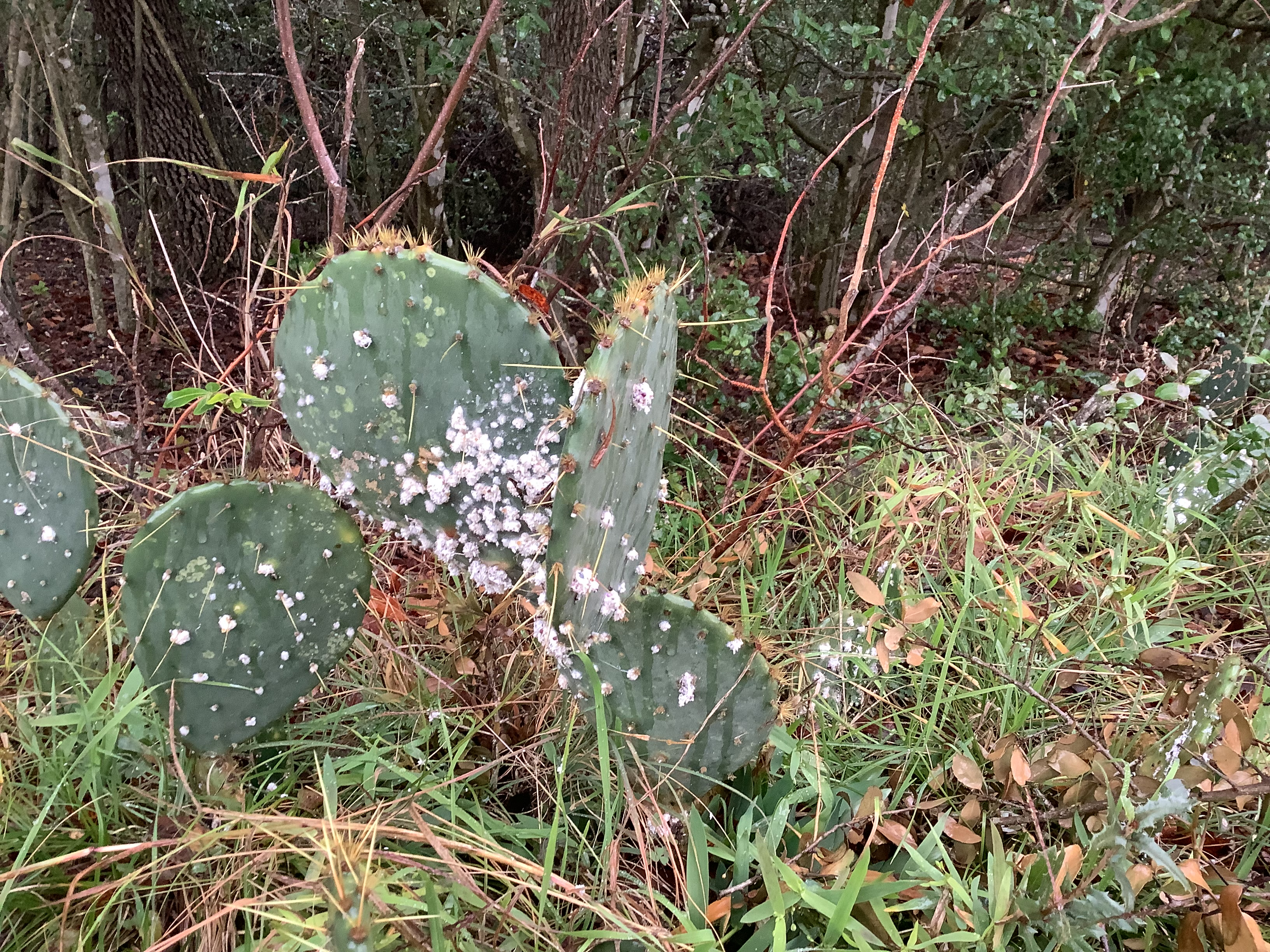
Specimen in Austin, Texas

Dactylopius opuntiae follows a life cycle similar to that of other species in the genus, consisting of two nymphal instars before adult females and two nymphal instars, prepupa, and pupa before adult males. Its biology has been studied in various regions, both in the laboratory and the open field, with female and male cycles lasting 77 and 43 days, respectively, in lab observations, and an offspring sex ratio of 3.7:1 (females:males) in greenhouse conditions. Field studies have shown that the female life cycle lasts 40–180 days, while males usually complete their cycle in 35–52 days. The optimal temperature for development is 30 °C, but males cannot emerge from the cocoon or adult females lay eggs at 35 °C, while crawlers' survival is negatively affected. The species usually reproduces bisexually, but it can reproduce by parthenogenesis under particular circumstances, such as high temperatures, resulting in lower progeny production.

The ovoviviparous females lay eggs one at a time beneath their bodies, with hatching occurring within 0.25–6 hours. Male and female crawlers are similar in appearance, but males of the Dactylopius austrinus species have shorter and fewer filaments than females. After a period of active dispersal, the crawlers settle down on the cladodes, often near the mother, and colonies are established at the joints of the cladode-trunk, flower-cladode, or fruit-cladode. Various factors can hinder cochineal development, including temperature, rain, and resistance factors of host plants. High temperatures and mechanical action of rain can negatively affect younger instars' survival, resulting in high mortality. Studies have shown that the species produces 4-5 generations per year in the Americas and Australia, with five generations occurring in the warmest areas.

== Distribution ==
Dactylopius opuntiae is native to Mexico and neighboring countries in Central America but has been introduced to several other areas, including Australia, Algeria, Morocco, Israel, France, India, Kenya, Madagascar, Pakistan, South Africa, Sri Lanka, and the United States (California and Texas).

=== Host cacti ===
- Opuntia ficus-indica
- Opuntia fuliginosa
- Opuntia humifusa
- Opuntia hyptiacantha
- Opuntia leucotricha
- Opuntia littoralis
- Opuntia engelmannii
- Opuntia maxima
- Opuntia ×occidentalis
- Opuntia robusta
- Opuntia streptacantha
- Opuntia stricta
- Opuntia tomentosa
- Opuntia tuna
- Tacinga palmadora

== Ecology ==
Like other members of Dactylopiidae, Dactylopius opuntiae is not affected by parasitoid wasps. In Mexico, its most commonly occurring predatory species have been found to be Leucopis bellula, Sympherobius barberi, and Laetilia coccidivora.

== Relationship with humans ==
=== Use as a biological control agent ===
In South Africa, Dactylopius opuntiae was introduced in 1932 along with three other insect species to control the cactus. Dactylopius opuntiae cleaned 75% of the infested areas, including those with the highest levels of opuntia infestation. Subsequently, about 90% of the original 900,000 ha returned to sheep-rearing due to the success of the cochineal as a biological control agent. However, dense populations of prickly pear still exist in cold and rainy areas, which are less favorable to the development of Dactylopius opuntiae. Subsequent introductions of Dactylopius opuntiae inside the Kruger National Park in the mid-1990s failed to control Opuntia stricta, confirming the importance of matching particular biotypes of biocontrol agents and host plants for weed control. A new strain of the cochineal was introduced from Opuntia stricta collected in Australia in 1997 with encouraging results. The genotype of Dactylopius opuntiae which effectively controlled Opuntia stricta in South Africa was also introduced in Kenya, resulting in the reduction in flowering and fruiting, and leading to the death of the plants.

De Souza & Hoffmann (2015) assessed the performance of Dactylopius opuntiae in controlling Opuntia monacantha, showing that it was less efficient than the congeneric Dactylopius ceylonicus, which provides complete biological control of this cactus species. Rule & Hoffmann (2018) investigated the effectiveness of the "stricta" biotype of Dactylopius opuntiae as a biological control agent for both Opuntia humifusa and Opuntia stricta. After a semi-field experiment, Dactylopius opuntiae was able to develop equally on both host plants. The dispersal capability of Dactylopius opuntiae away from the first areas of inoculum was assessed to promote a quicker spread of the scale insect. The colonies needed to be inoculated at no more than 10 m in between, as the spread of cochineal is primarily anemophilous. The efficacy of Dactylopius opuntiae is often limited by predator coccinellids and to a greater extent by rain. In South Africa, the use of prickly pear for human consumption, for forage, and as a host plant for the rearing of Dactylopius coccus has increased due to the reduction in the role of the prickly pear as a weed and the success of Dactylopius opuntiae as a biological control agent.

Dactylopius opuntiae can also have a strong negative impact on both the production of prickly pear fruit for fresh consumption and on cladodes as fodder for livestock feed. The cochineal species tends to form variably sized colonies on cladodes, which in some cases are totally covered by the insect. As a consequence, the fruits drop and cladodes dry out and fall off.

=== Pest ===
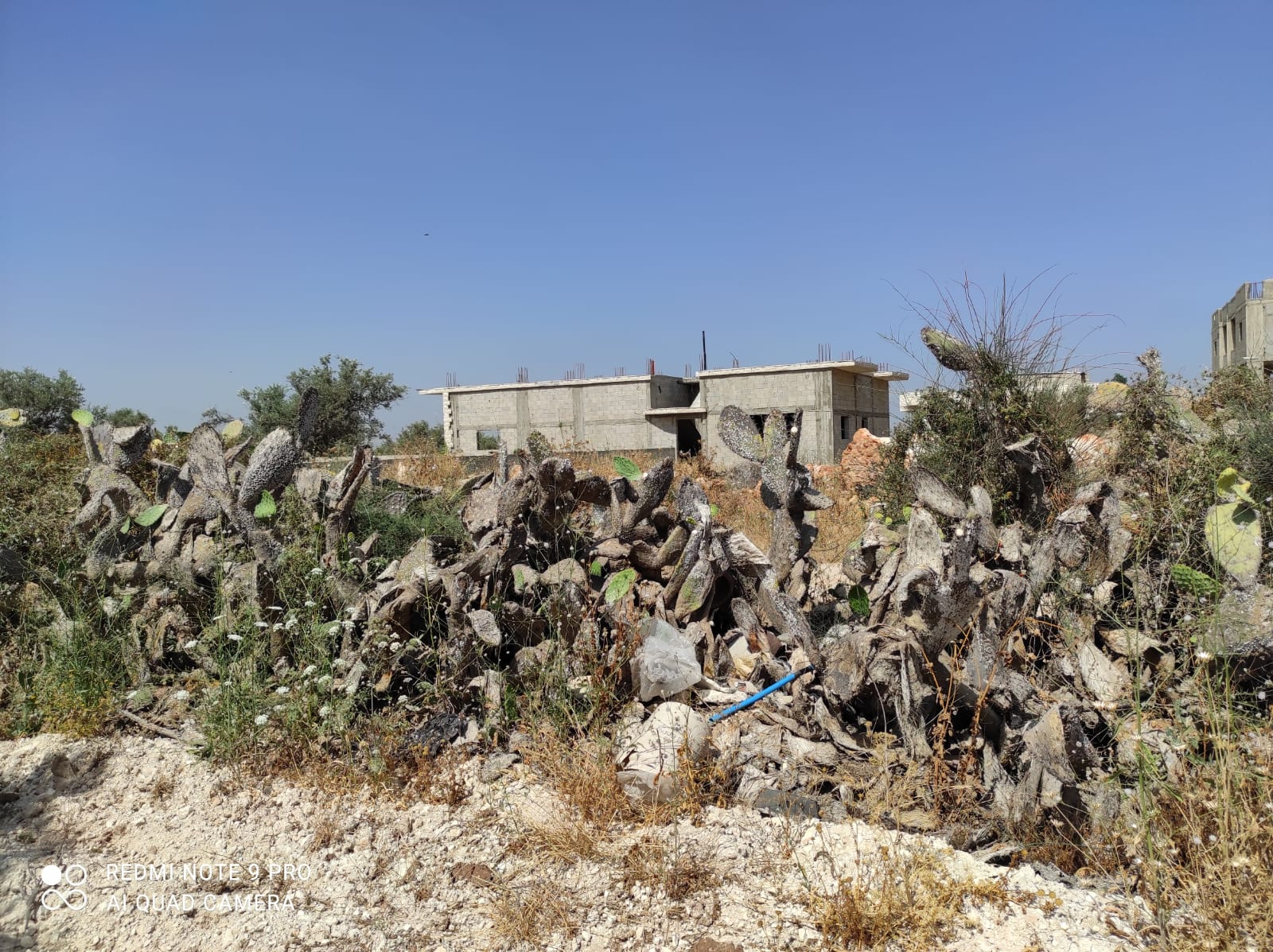
Opuntia covered by Dactylopius opuntiae

Dactylopius opuntiae can have a devastating impact on the production of both prickly pear fruit and cladodes as livestock feed. The species has a tendency to form colonies of varying sizes on cladodes, often completely covering the plant. This leads to the dropping of fruit and the drying out and eventual falling off of the cladodes. The damage starts with yellowish areas and necrosis on the cladodes, which then leads to drying out of the entire plant within a year. The woody stems can survive for another six months after this, but the damage is already done. The high population level of Dactylopius opuntiae weakens the plants, which pathogens attack, in turn causing their death.

In northeastern Brazil, Dactylopius opuntiae was imported from Mexico to produce dye, but it has caused significant damage to forage cactus production. In other Brazilian states such as Pernambuco, Paraíba, and Ceará, Dactylopius opuntiae infested over 100,000 hectares, resulting in more than US$100 million in annual damage, with serious socioeconomic consequences for farming communities where milk production is linked to prickly pear cultivation. Since its first detection in Morocco in September 2014, Dactylopius opuntiae has spread rapidly and caused serious damage to Opuntia ficus-indica plants, leading local authorities to uproot and incinerate over 400 hectares of plantations in the Doukkala region. The Moroccan Ministry of Agriculture implemented an emergency plan for Dactylopius opuntiae management in 2016, including a research program focusing on the most important components of cochineal management. Several insecticides such as chlorpyrifos, pyriproxyfen, acetamiprid, spirotetramat, and mineral oils have been authorized for use in Morocco to control the pest. However, chemical treatment of the cochineal colonies only provided temporary solutions against the pest. Several studies have observed that essential oils, botanical extracts, vegetable oils, detergents, and other bioactive chemicals have a strong insecticidal effect on the pest in cactus plantations. Bouharroud et al. (2018) evaluated the efficacy of D-Limonene, a widespread terpene, against Dactylopius opuntiae. The greatest female mortality rate was 99% at 150 ppm 6 days after treatment. Plant clones that are resistant to Dactylopius opuntiae can be an effective way to manage the pest. The thickness of the cactus plant's cuticle and epidermis, as well as the presence of calcium oxalate, play a crucial role in resistance to the pest. In Morocco, eight cultivars have shown immunity-type resistance to Dactylopius opuntiae, and more research is needed to develop resistant cultivars. Mechanical and physical methods, such as pruning and uprooting, can also be used to control the pest, but they are only effective when just a few plants are infested.

The extensive damage caused by Dactylopius opuntiae requires an integrated pest management (IPM) approach.

In 2012, Dactylopius opuntiae was first discovered in southern Lebanon on Opuntia ficus-indica plants. By 2014, the species was found to be widespread in the south of the country and causing severe damage to the cactus plants, whose fruit is an important source of income for local farmers. In 2015, new infestations were observed in neighboring regions. Although the predator beetle Cryptolaemus montrouzieri was found in association with the Dactylopius opuntiae colonies, their numbers were not high enough to control the pest population.

In 2013, the presence of Dactylopius opuntiae was reported for the first time in Israel. The insect was collected from Opuntia ficus-indica plants in the Hula Valley of the Upper Galilee.

The insect's natural predators help contain the damage they cause in Central American countries where Opuntia ficus-indica originates.

== See also ==
- Phyllosticta concava
