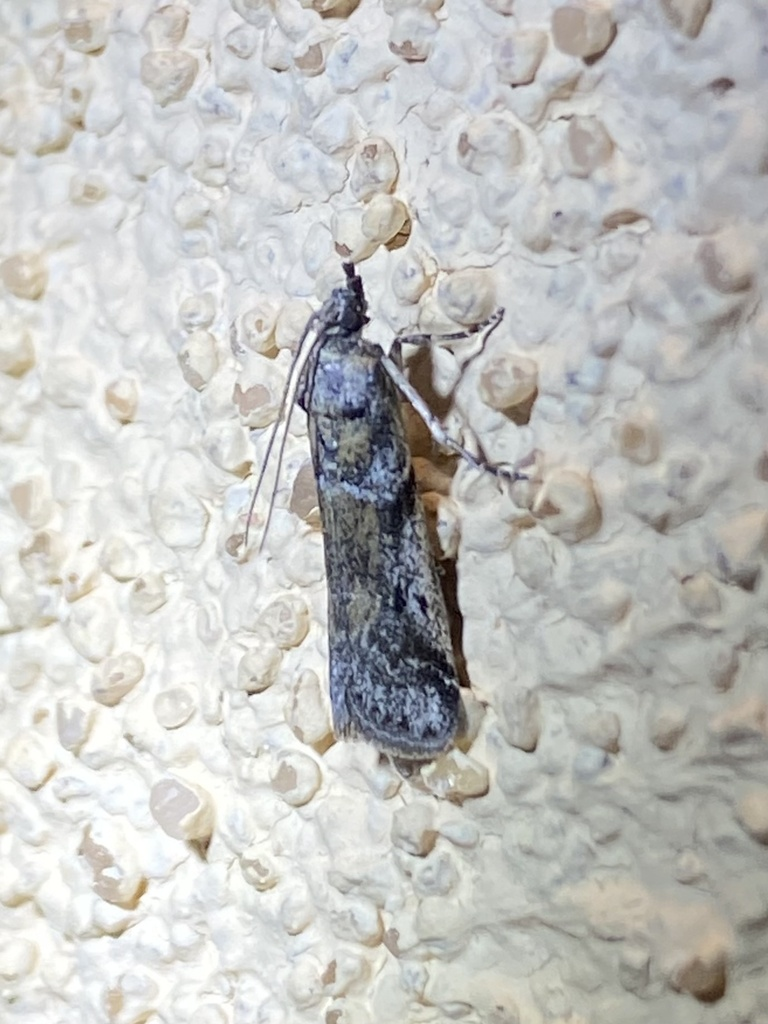

Scientific classification
- Domain: Eukaryota
- Kingdom: Animalia
- Phylum: Arthropoda
- Class: Insecta
- Order: Lepidoptera
- Family: Pyralidae
- Genus: Laetilia
- Species: L. dilatifasciella

Binomial name
- Laetilia dilatifasciella (Ragonot, 1887)

Synonyms
- Zophodia dilatifasciella Ragonot, 1887

= Laetilia dilatifasciella =

Species of moth

Laetilia dilatifasciella is a species of snout moth in the genus Laetilia. It was described by Ragonot in 1887. It is found from southern New Mexico to southern California.

The length of the forewings is 6–8 mm. Adults are on wing in May and again from July to October.

The larvae are predatory on Cerococcidae, Coccidae, Dactylopiidae and Kermesidae species. Larvae can be found in May and October.

== Taxonomy ==
The species was formerly considered a synonym of Laetilia coccidivora.
