= L. portoricensis =

L. portoricensis may refer to:

- Laetilia portoricensis, a snout moth
- Laudetia portoricensis, an eight-eyed spider
- Leptosphaeria portoricensis, a fungus with pseudoparaphyses
- Linsleyonides portoricensis, a longhorn beetle
- Liophis portoricensis, a water snake
- Loxigilla portoricensis, a bullfinch tanager
- Lyssomanes portoricensis, a jumping spider
