= Common prickly pear =

Common prickly pear is a common name which may refer to certain species of cactus in the genus Opuntia including:

- Opuntia ficus-indica
- Opuntia monacantha, native to South America
- Opuntia stricta
