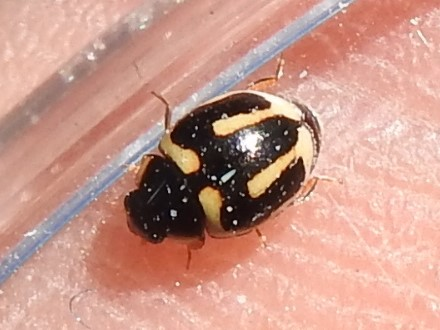

Scientific classification
- Kingdom: Animalia
- Phylum: Arthropoda
- Clade: Pancrustacea
- Class: Insecta
- Order: Coleoptera
- Suborder: Polyphaga
- Infraorder: Cucujiformia
- Family: Coccinellidae
- Genus: Hyperaspis
- Species: H. trifurcata

Binomial name
- Hyperaspis trifurcata Schaeffer, 1905

Synonyms
- Hyperaspis durangoensis Casey, 1924; Hyperaspis disjunctus Casey, 1924

= Hyperaspis trifurcata =

Species of beetle

Hyperaspis trifurcata, also known as the trident lady beetle, is a species of lady beetle in the family Coccinellidae. It is found in North America, where it has been recorded from Mexico (Durango), Arizona and Texas. It has been deliberately introduced as a biological control agent in Israel, targeting invasive populations of Dactylopius opuntiae, and has recently been recorded in Jordan. Both larvae and adults are specialist predators of the cochineal scale (Dactylopius spp.), which feed on prickly pear cacti of the genus Opuntia. The larval and pupal stages are parasitized by the encyrtid wasp Homalotylus cockerelli. Females lay their eggs in the wax secreted by cochineal scales to conceal them from parasites, where the larvae continue to shelter after hatching. The gut microbiome of H. trifurcata has been shown to contain bacteria which may aid in the digestion of carminic acid, a toxic substance found in the cochineal scale's hemolymph. The beetles also appropriate carminic acid to deter predation by ants, lending the larvae a red color.

== Description ==
Adults reach a length of about 2.3–3 mm. The pronotum is black with a reddish yellow lateral border. The elytra are black with a variable red or yellow pattern. The species' name originates from this pattern's resemblance to a trident. Males can be identified by white coloration on the face.
