= Cochineal prickly pear =

Cochineal prickly pear is a common name which may refer to several species of cactus in the genus Opuntia including:

- Opuntia ficus-indica
- Opuntia monacantha
