= Laetilia hulstii =

Scientific classification
- Domain: Eukaryota
- Kingdom: Animalia
- Phylum: Arthropoda
- Class: Insecta
- Order: Lepidoptera
- Family: Pyralidae
- Genus: Laetilia
- Species: L. hulstii

Binomial name
- Laetilia hulstii Cockerell, 1897

Species of moth

Laetilia hulstii is a species of snout moth in the genus Laetilia. It was described by Theodore Dru Alison Cockerell in 1897. It is found in the US state of California.

== Taxonomy ==
The species was formerly considered a synonym of Laetilia coccidivora.
