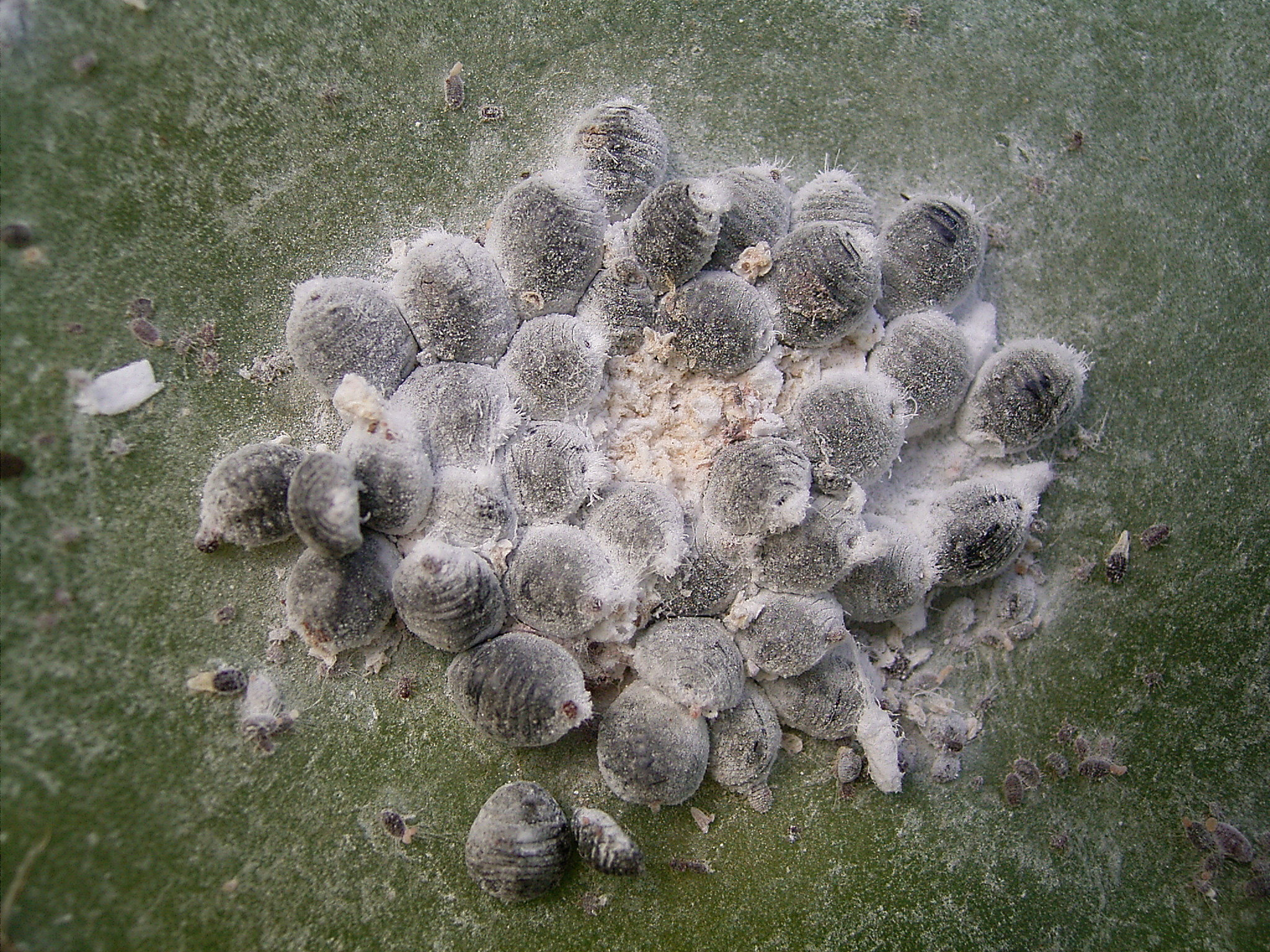
- Dactylopius coccus

Scientific classification
- Domain: Eukaryota
- Kingdom: Animalia
- Phylum: Arthropoda
- Class: Insecta
- Order: Hemiptera
- Suborder: Sternorrhyncha
- Infraorder: Coccomorpha
- Superfamily: Coccoidea
- Family: Dactylopiidae; Signoret, 1875
- Genus: Dactylopius; Costa, 1835

Species
- See text

= Dactylopius =

Genus of insects

Dactylopius is a genus of insect in the superfamily Coccoidea, the scale insects. It is the only genus in the family Dactylopiidae. These insects are known commonly as cochineals, a name that also specifically refers to the best-known species, the cochineal (Dactylopius coccus). The cochineal is an insect of economic and historical importance as a main source of the red dye carmine. It has reportedly been used for this purpose in the Americas since the 10th century. Genus Dactylopius is also important because several species have been used as agents of biological pest control, and because several are known as invasive species.

== Description ==
In general, cochineals are waxy gray scaled insects, with the key characteristic that adult females release the bright red substance when crushed known as carminic acid. Most species belonging to this genus are covered in thin, sticky strands of wax; D. coccus is one such species which lacks these traits. Common with the characteristics of most scaled insects, the species within this genus too show sexual dimorphism between male and female individuals. Where females of the genus possess a simple morphology (standard body, with a head, mouth, legs, etc.), though lacking wings of any kind; the males of the genus are the opposite, possessing a singular set of wings, and no mouth at all. (See D. coccus for example.)

== Biology ==
Cochineals live on cactus plants, especially prickly pears (Opuntia spp.), as well as Cylindropuntia and Grusonia species. One species was collected from Corynopuntia schottii. They gather in large clumps mainly in shady, sheltered areas on the cactus pads and feed on the sap. Some species also infest the cactus fruits, flowers, stems, and roots; they are often found on the roots during times of the year when they are less active. Females have three developmental stages (instars), and males have five. They reproduce continuously year-round, with up to six generations per year. Eggs hatch very soon after they are laid, sometimes within minutes, and probably even occasionally while they are still inside the female. D. tomentosus carries its eggs on its body in a mesh of fibers. The wax filaments are produced from setae on the juvenile insect's head. These webby filaments likely aid in dispersal of the insects by catching the wind.

Dactylopius species can be found on cacti in many types of dry habitat, including forests, grasslands, cultivated fields, disturbed and weedy areas, and gardens. They share cactus host plants with various ants, spiders, the larva of the snout moth Laetilia coccidivora, a brown lacewing (Symherobius sp.), and lady beetles in the genera Chilocorus and Hyperaspis.

== Distribution ==
The genus is native to the Americas, with some originating in South America and the others in North America, including Mexico and the southwestern United States. D. coccus apparently has a disjunct distribution today, occurring in Mexico and also in Peru, but not in the region between. Molecular phylogenetic studies of the genus suggest that D. coccus originated in South America and was introduced to Mexico with various agricultural products during the pre-Columbian era.

The genus is now distributed throughout much of the world due to accidental and intentional introductions.

== Cochineal dye ==
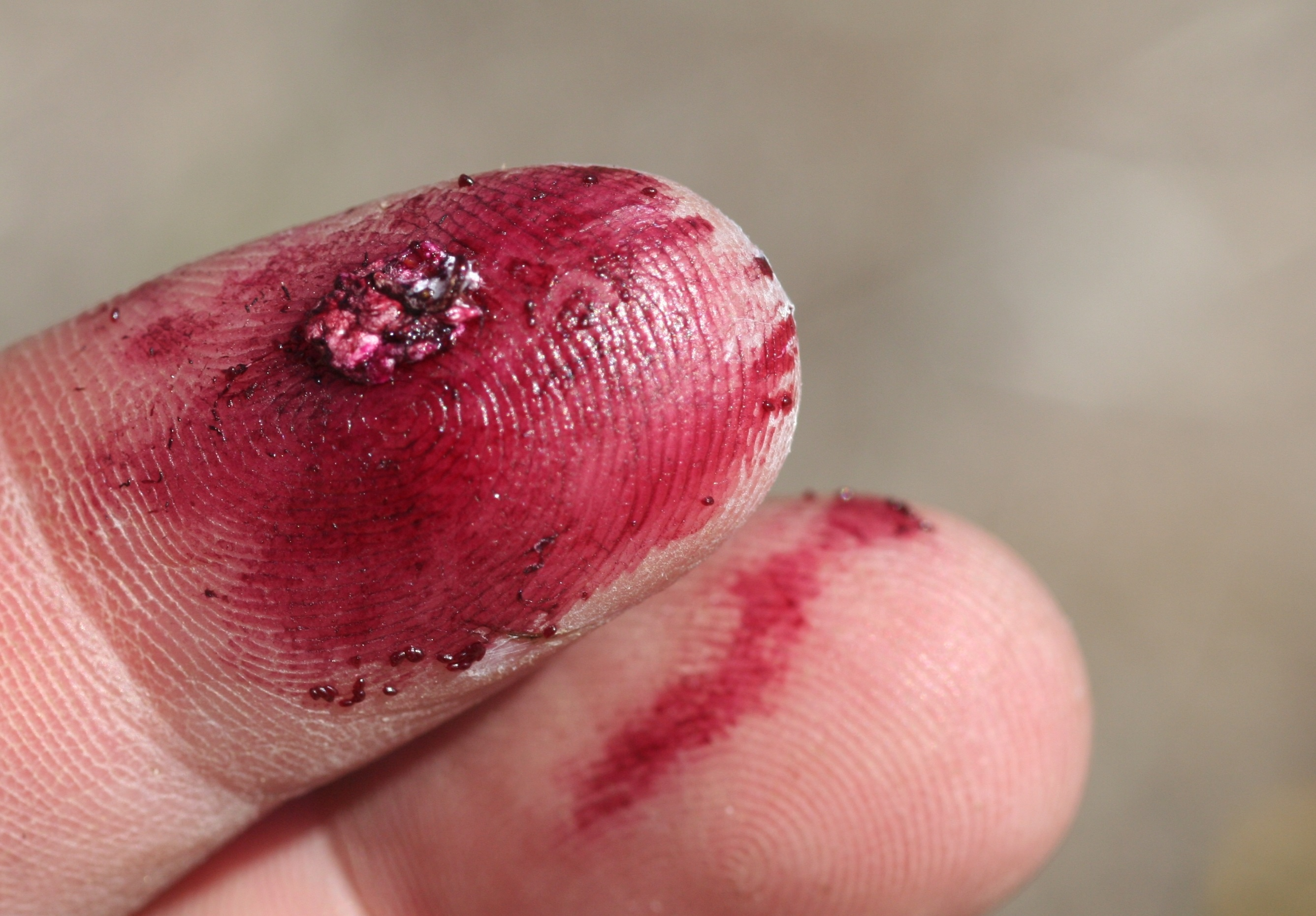
Dactylopius confusus crushed

The insects produce carminic acid as an antipredator adaptation. It is processed to produce the pigment carmine, which has long been used as a red food coloring and a natural dye for textiles. Dactylopius coccus, the true cochineal, is the species most commonly used today and historically, because it has a higher carminic acid content and yields a better quality pigment than its congeners. The insect has been domesticated and is reared for its product.

Cochineals were of value to the pre-Columbian societies of the Andes region. Rulers of the Inca Empire stored supplies of the insects as a commodity, as they were the only source of red dye for clothing and other textiles. Red was the color of royalty among the Incas. After Spanish colonization of the Americas began, cochineals were shipped worldwide as a commercial product.

The dried bodies of the female insects are roughly 12 to 16% carminic acid. The carmine obtained is a shade of crimson, and this can be turned different shades by adding metal ions or changing the pH; tin salts or acids produce a bright scarlet, while iron or alkaline compounds turn it a deep purple. The Salasacas of Ecuador still use this process to color their textiles, particularly a red woolen garment worn by women around the shoulders, which each woman personalizes by choosing a different shade of red. They collect cochineals, probably D. confusus, from the wild, press them into cakes, and use the dried cakes to dye the garments three at a time. One is left crimson, one is soaked in lemon juice to turn it scarlet, and the third is rubbed with wood ashes to turn it purple.

== Biological control ==
Some cacti are invasive plants, and as parasites of cacti, Dactylopius species have been employed as agents of biological pest control in Africa and Australia. The first example of an herbivorous insect ever used for the biological control of a weed was D. ceylonicus, which was released onto Opuntia ficus-indica, then known as O. vulgaris, in Sri Lanka in 1863. D. opuntiae has been effective against the weedy prickly pear Opuntia stricta, and D. austrinus is used to control Opuntia aurantiaca.

== As a pest ==
O. ficus-indica is a cactus cultivated as a food crop, and it is the most commonly noted host plant of Dactylopius species. D. coccus can be found in fields of the cultivated plant and on specimens in the wild. D. opuntiae is an economically important pest of this cactus in many regions.

== Diversity ==
This genus is monophyletic. There are eleven species. In addition to the nine that long composed the genus, D. bassi was transferred from genus Coccus in 2001 and D. gracilipilus was newly described in 2012.

Species include:

- Dactylopius austrinus
- Dactylopius bassi
- Dactylopius ceylonicus
- Dactylopius coccus – true cochineal
- Dactylopius confertus
- Dactylopius confusus
- Dactylopius gracilipilus
- Dactylopius opuntiae
- Dactylopius salmianus
- Dactylopius tomentosus
- Dactylopius zimmermanni
