= Opuntia matudae =

Scientific classification
- Kingdom: Plantae
- Clade: Tracheophytes
- Clade: Angiosperms
- Clade: Eudicots
- Order: Caryophyllales
- Family: Cactaceae
- Genus: Opuntia
- Species: O. matudae

Binomial name
- Opuntia matudae Scheinvar

Species of cactus

Opuntia matudae, or xoconostle, is a cactus native to Mexico. It is sometimes treated as a synonym of Opuntia hyptiacantha. In 2019, a genetic study supported keeping the taxa distinct.

== Uses ==
Opuntia matudae is the most commercially important species of cactus referred to as 'xoconostle'. Opuntia joconostle is also referred to as 'xoconostle'.

The cactus fruit is consumed as a traditional medicine and food in Mexico.
