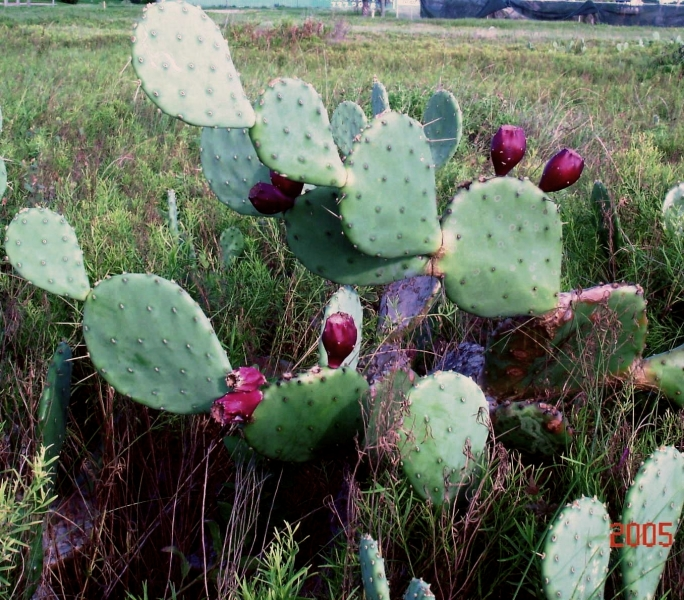

Scientific classification
- Kingdom: Plantae
- Clade: Tracheophytes
- Clade: Angiosperms
- Clade: Eudicots
- Order: Caryophyllales
- Family: Cactaceae
- Genus: Opuntia
- Species: O. anahuacensis

Binomial name
- Opuntia anahuacensis Griffiths

= Opuntia anahuacensis =

Species of cactus

Opuntia anahuacensis is a cactus species in the genus Opuntia of the family Opuntioideae. It is commonly misidentified as O. lindheimeri and less commonly as O. bentonii.

== Description ==
The plants are short, approximately 1-2 feet tall with shrubbery tendencies. Some thickets may be 20-40 feet across and composed of multiple plants. The fruit is purplish. The cladodes are uniquely shaped, obovate with a neck. The original description claimed the plants were yellowish green, but they may be green or rarely blue-green.

== Distribution and habitat ==
It grows along the Gulf Coast of Texas, and possibly northern Mexico.
