= Laetilia hebraica =

Scientific classification
- Domain: Eukaryota
- Kingdom: Animalia
- Phylum: Arthropoda
- Class: Insecta
- Order: Lepidoptera
- Family: Pyralidae
- Genus: Laetilia
- Species: L. hebraica

Binomial name
- Laetilia hebraica de Joannis, 1927

Species of moth

Laetilia hebraica is a species of snout moth in the genus Laetilia. It was described by Joseph de Joannis in 1927. It is found in Mozambique.
