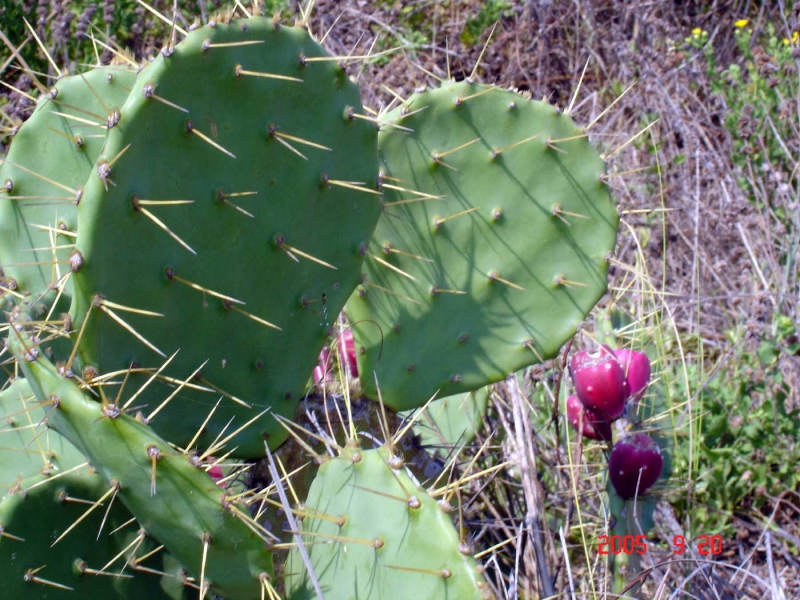

Scientific classification
- Kingdom: Plantae
- Clade: Tracheophytes
- Clade: Angiosperms
- Clade: Eudicots
- Order: Caryophyllales
- Family: Cactaceae
- Genus: Opuntia
- Species: O. bentonii

Binomial name
- Opuntia bentonii Griffiths

= Opuntia bentonii =

Species of cactus

Opuntia bentonii was proposed by some botanists to be a synonym of Opuntia stricta. However, O. bentonii, which grows in Texas, is separate and distinct from O. stricta. O. bentonii was clearly described by Griffiths in 1911. Along with O. stricta,O. bentonii was one of the pest pears of Australia in the early Twentieth Century.

== The Details ==
Like so many Opuntia species, O. bentonii has been mistaken for a coastal form of O. lindheimeri in Texas, but there are sustained differences. For instance, O. bentonii plants are often less than 60 cm in height and the fruit is more globular (less inclined to narrow at the base). O. bentonii plants have fewer spines than O. lindheimeri, zero to 3 (often only 1 or 2). One important difference is that the stigmas of O. bentonii flowers are yellow and not green as in O. lindheimeri. Another individual feature of O. bentonii is that the veins are often visible between areoles.

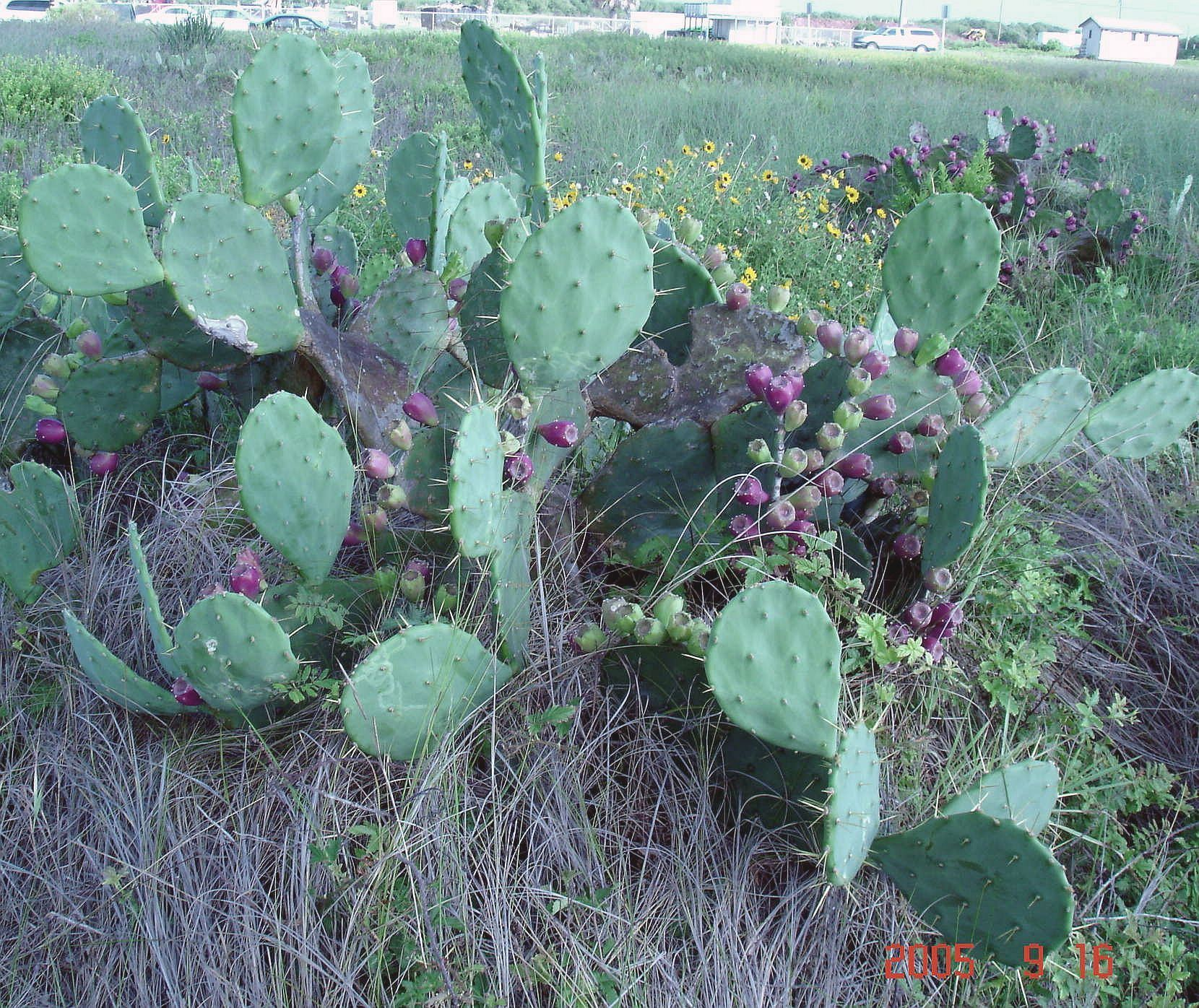
Mature O. bentonii plant with fruit, Galveston Island, TX
