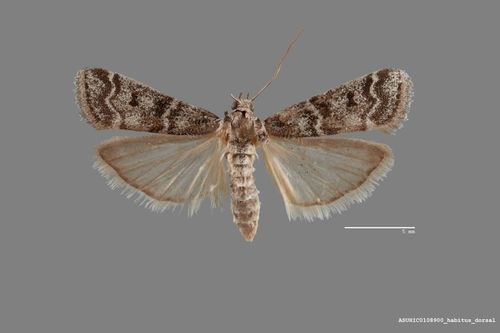

Scientific classification
- Kingdom: Animalia
- Phylum: Arthropoda
- Class: Insecta
- Order: Lepidoptera
- Family: Pyralidae
- Genus: Laetilia
- Species: L. zamacrella

Binomial name
- Laetilia zamacrella Dyar, 1925

= Laetilia zamacrella =

Species of moth

Laetilia zamacrella is a species of snout moth in the genus Laetilia. It was described by Harrison Gray Dyar Jr. in 1925. It is found in the US state of California.
