= Laetilia loxogramma =

Scientific classification
- Domain: Eukaryota
- Kingdom: Animalia
- Phylum: Arthropoda
- Class: Insecta
- Order: Lepidoptera
- Family: Pyralidae
- Genus: Laetilia
- Species: L. loxogramma

Binomial name
- Laetilia loxogramma (Staudinger, 1870)

Synonyms
- Myelois loxogramma Staudinger, 1870

Species of moth

Laetilia loxogramma is a species of snout moth in the genus Laetilia. It was described by Staudinger in 1870. It is found on the Canary Islands and mainland Spain.
