= Salasaca =

Coordinates: 1°20′07″S 78°33′58″W

Regions with significant populations
- Ecuador: Tungurahua Province; Galápagos islands

Languages
- Kichwa, Spanish

Religion
- Catholicism, Incan mythology

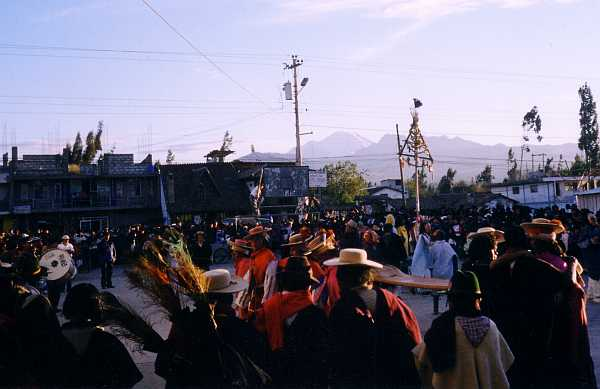

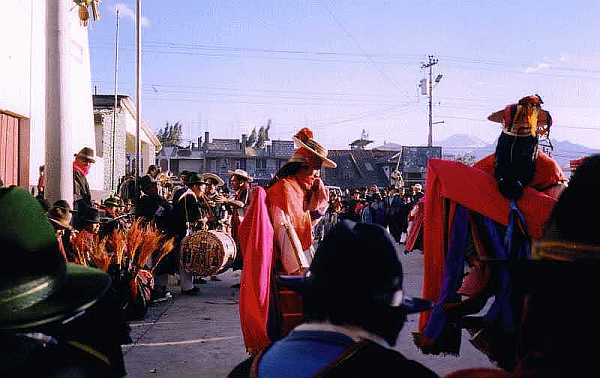
Celebration of Inti Raymi by the Salasaca; in the background Chimborazo can be seen

Salasaca is a community and an indigenous people located in the Tungurahua Province in the center of Ecuador, halfway along the road from Ambato to Baños. The Salasaca speak Spanish and their traditional language of Quichua. Their main economic activities are agriculture, livestock-raising, and handcrafts.

A market in the central plaza of Salasaca is called "Plaza of the Arts." Local craftsmanship includes items such as tapestries, which are woven by hand on looms of very ancient technology. Many of the designs depict different aspects of their lives. Pigments are often derived from the female cochineal of the Dactylopius family which are crushed to make red colors. Salasca women wear a woolen garment around the shoulders, personalized by choosing a different shade of red. After pressing the insects into cakes, they use the dried cakes to dye the garments three at a time. One is left crimson, one is soaked in lemon juice to turn it scarlet, and the third is rubbed with wood ashes to turn it purple.

The Quichua Salasaca perform traditional music using a flute and drum. In the 21st century, the Quechua Salasaca have been incorporating other sounds that complement their traditional melodies.

In June, Salasaca people celebrate the Inca new year festival called Inti Raymi, an ancient festival of the sun, which is celebrated in all Quechua communities of the Highlands (Sierra). In the Salasaca festival circuit, the Varayuk or Mayor, who carries a wand that represents power and authority within the community, is the main personality.
