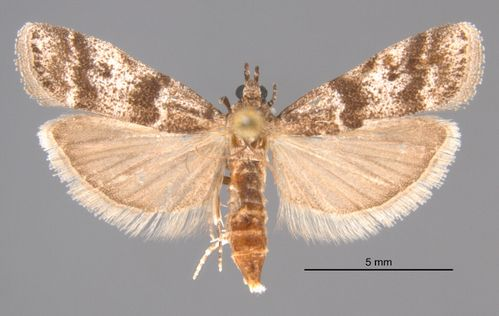

Scientific classification
- Domain: Eukaryota
- Kingdom: Animalia
- Phylum: Arthropoda
- Class: Insecta
- Order: Lepidoptera
- Family: Pyralidae
- Genus: Laetilia
- Species: L. myersella

Binomial name
- Laetilia myersella Dyar, 1910

= Laetilia myersella =

Species of moth

Laetilia myersella is a species of snout moth in the genus Laetilia. It was described by Harrison Gray Dyar Jr. in 1910. It is found in eastern North America, including Florida, Massachusetts, South Carolina and West Virginia.

The wingspan is 11–17 mm.

The larvae feed on scale insects occurring on Pinus species.
