= Laetilia bellivorella =

Scientific classification
- Domain: Eukaryota
- Kingdom: Animalia
- Phylum: Arthropoda
- Class: Insecta
- Order: Lepidoptera
- Family: Pyralidae
- Genus: Laetilia
- Species: L. bellivorella

Binomial name
- Laetilia bellivorella Neunzig, 1997

Species of moth

Laetilia bellivorella is a species of snout moth in the genus Laetilia. It was described by Herbert H. Neunzig in 1997. It is found in the US state of Florida.
