= Laetilia melanostathma =

Scientific classification
- Kingdom: Animalia
- Phylum: Arthropoda
- Class: Insecta
- Order: Lepidoptera
- Family: Pyralidae
- Genus: Laetilia
- Species: L. melanostathma

Binomial name
- Laetilia melanostathma (Meyrick, 1937)

Synonyms
- Euzophera melanostathma Meyrick, 1937

Species of moth

Laetilia melanostathma is a species of snout moth in the genus Laetilia. It was described by Edward Meyrick in 1937. It is found in Argentina.
