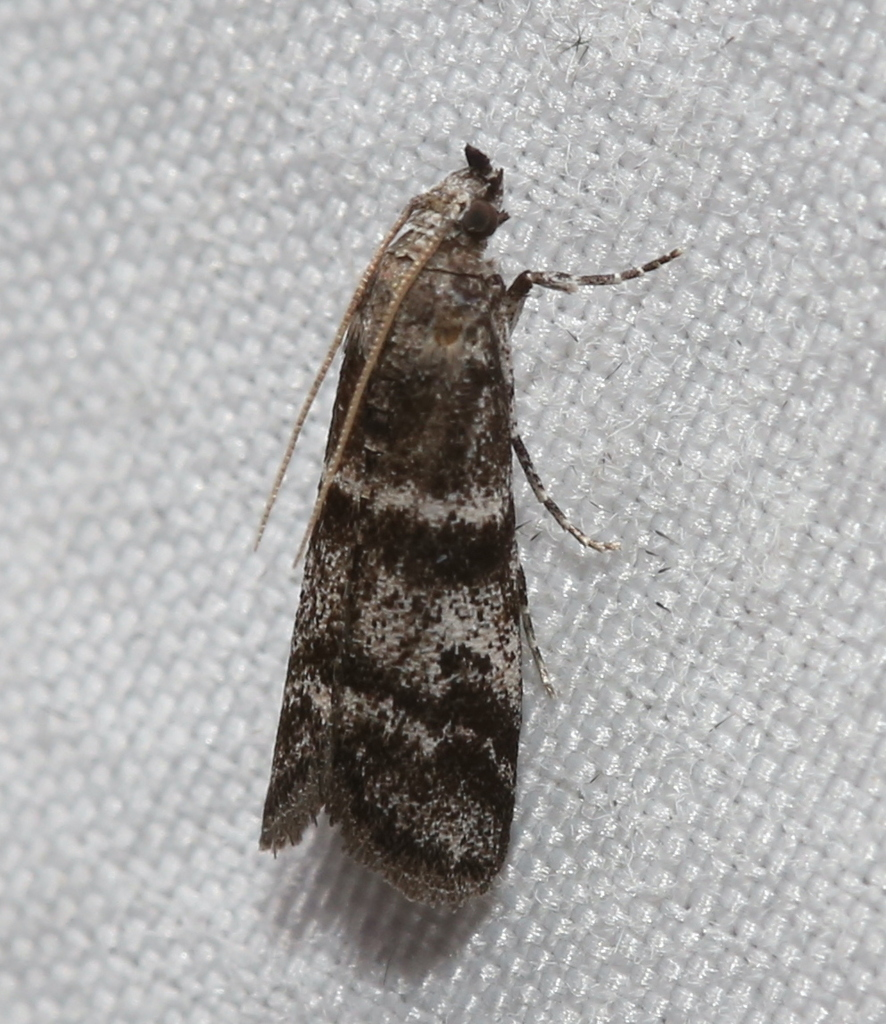

Scientific classification
- Kingdom: Animalia
- Phylum: Arthropoda
- Class: Insecta
- Order: Lepidoptera
- Family: Pyralidae
- Genus: Laetilia
- Species: L. fiskella

Binomial name
- Laetilia fiskella Dyar, 1904

Synonyms
- Euzophera glomis Dyar, 1914

= Laetilia fiskella =

Species of moth

Laetilia fiskella is a species of snout moth in the genus Laetilia. It was described by Harrison Gray Dyar Jr. in 1904. It is found in eastern North America, including Florida, Maryland, South Carolina, Tennessee and West Virginia.
