= Linsleyonides chemsaki =

Scientific classification
- Kingdom: Animalia
- Phylum: Arthropoda
- Class: Insecta
- Order: Coleoptera
- Suborder: Polyphaga
- Infraorder: Cucujiformia
- Family: Cerambycidae
- Genus: Linsleyonides
- Species: L. chemsaki

Binomial name
- Linsleyonides chemsaki Skiles, 1985

Species of beetle

Linsleyonides chemsaki is a species of beetle in the family Cerambycidae. It was described by Skiles in 1985.
