= Laetilia ephestiella =

Scientific classification
- Domain: Eukaryota
- Kingdom: Animalia
- Phylum: Arthropoda
- Class: Insecta
- Order: Lepidoptera
- Family: Pyralidae
- Genus: Laetilia
- Species: L. ephestiella

Binomial name
- Laetilia ephestiella (Ragonot, 1887)

Synonyms
- Dakruma ephestiella Ragonot, 1887; Maricopa lustrella Dyar, 1903

Species of moth

Laetilia ephestiella is a species of snout moth in the genus Laetilia. It was described by Ragonot in 1887. It is found in the southern United States, including California, Arizona and Texas.
