= Linsleyonides albomaculatus =

Scientific classification
- Kingdom: Animalia
- Phylum: Arthropoda
- Class: Insecta
- Order: Coleoptera
- Suborder: Polyphaga
- Infraorder: Cucujiformia
- Family: Cerambycidae
- Genus: Linsleyonides
- Species: L. albomaculatus

Binomial name
- Linsleyonides albomaculatus (Champlain & Knull, 1922)

Species of beetle

Linsleyonides albomaculatus is a species of beetle in the family Cerambycidae. It was described by Champlain and Knull in 1922.
