= Laetilia =

Scientific classification
- Domain: Eukaryota
- Kingdom: Animalia
- Phylum: Arthropoda
- Class: Insecta
- Order: Lepidoptera
- Family: Pyralidae
- Tribe: Phycitini
- Genus: Laetilia; Ragonot, 1889

Genus of moths

Laetilia is a genus of snout moths. It was described by Émile Louis Ragonot in 1889.

== Biology ==
The larvae feed on various scale insects and occasionally flowers of scale infested plants.

== Species ==
- Laetilia amphimetra Meyrick, 1939
- Laetilia bellivorella Neunzig, 1997
- Laetilia cinerosella Neunzig, 1997
- Laetilia coccidivora (Comstock, 1879)
- Laetilia dilatifasciella (Ragonot, 1887)
- Laetilia ephestiella (Ragonot, 1887)
- Laetilia fiskella Dyar, 1904
- Laetilia glomis (Dyar, 1914)
- Laetilia hebraica de Joannis, 1927
- Laetilia hulstii Cockerell, 1897
- Laetilia loxogramma (Staudinger, 1870)
- Laetilia melanostathma Meyrick, 1937
- Laetilia myersella Dyar, 1910
- Laetilia obscura Dyar, 1918
- Laetilia portoricensis Dyar, 1915
- Laetilia zamacrella Dyar, 1925
