= Laetilia obscura =

Scientific classification
- Kingdom: Animalia
- Phylum: Arthropoda
- Class: Insecta
- Order: Lepidoptera
- Family: Pyralidae
- Genus: Laetilia
- Species: L. obscura

Binomial name
- Laetilia obscura Dyar, 1918

Species of moth

Laetilia obscura is a species of snout moth in the genus Laetilia. It was described by Harrison Gray Dyar Jr. in 1918. It is found on Cuba.
