= Laetilia amphimetra =

Scientific classification
- Kingdom: Animalia
- Phylum: Arthropoda
- Class: Insecta
- Order: Lepidoptera
- Family: Pyralidae
- Genus: Laetilia
- Species: L. amphimetra

Binomial name
- Laetilia amphimetra (Meyrick, 1939)

Synonyms
- Euzophera amphimetra Meyrick, 1939

Species of moth

Laetilia amphimetra is a species of snout moth in the genus Laetilia. It was described by Edward Meyrick in 1939. It is found in Argentina.
