= Linsleyonides =

Scientific classification
- Kingdom: Animalia
- Phylum: Arthropoda
- Class: Insecta
- Order: Coleoptera
- Suborder: Polyphaga
- Infraorder: Cucujiformia
- Family: Cerambycidae
- Tribe: Elaphidiini
- Genus: Linsleyonides

Genus of beetles

Linsleyonides is a genus of beetles in the family Cerambycidae, containing the following species:

- Linsleyonides albomaculatus (Champlain & Knull, 1922)
- Linsleyonides chemsaki Skiles, 1985
- Linsleyonides portoricensis (Fisher, 1932)
