= Laetilia glomis =

Scientific classification
- Kingdom: Animalia
- Phylum: Arthropoda
- Class: Insecta
- Order: Lepidoptera
- Family: Pyralidae
- Genus: Laetilia
- Species: L. glomis

Binomial name
- Laetilia glomis (Dyar, 1914)

Synonyms
- Euzophera glomis Dyar, 1914

Species of moth

Laetilia glomis is a species of snout moth in the genus Laetilia. It was described by Harrison Gray Dyar Jr. in 1914. It is found in Panama.
