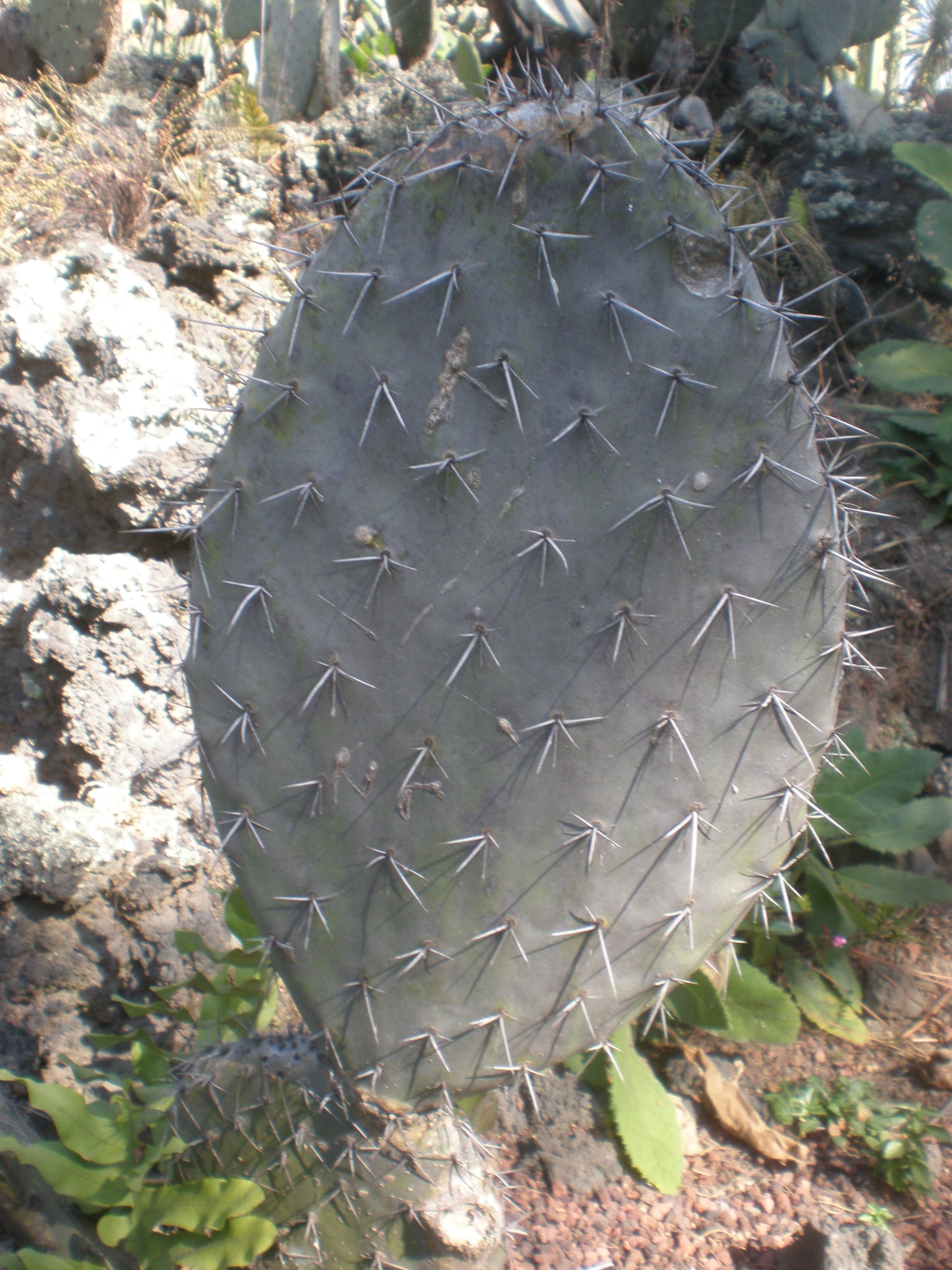

Conservation status
- Least Concern (IUCN 2.3)

Scientific classification
- Kingdom: Plantae
- Clade: Tracheophytes
- Clade: Angiosperms
- Clade: Eudicots
- Order: Caryophyllales
- Family: Cactaceae
- Genus: Opuntia
- Species: O. fuliginosa

Binomial name
- Opuntia fuliginosa Griffiths

= Opuntia fuliginosa =

Species of cactus

Opuntia fuliginosa is a species of prickly pear cactus found in the Sonoran Desert in Mexico.

== Description ==
The plant grows in a tree-like manner reaching up to 4 meters tall. Trunks are woody and the stems are segmented, with individual segments (cladodes or pads) around 15–20 cm long. Glochids are present within the areoles and fruits. Fruits are red and obovoid to spindle shaped, bearing many glochids.

== Distribution and habitat ==
O. fuliginosa can be found growing around southern North America and southwest Mexico (Hidalgo, Guerrero, Guanajuato, Jalisco, Michoacán, Morelos, Nayarit, Oaxaca and Querétaro). The plant inhabits lowland areas such as deciduous forests, dry shrubland and steep slopes.
