= Laetilia portoricensis =

Scientific classification
- Kingdom: Animalia
- Phylum: Arthropoda
- Class: Insecta
- Order: Lepidoptera
- Family: Pyralidae
- Genus: Laetilia
- Species: L. portoricensis

Binomial name
- Laetilia portoricensis Dyar, 1915

Species of moth

Laetilia portoricensis is a species of snout moth in the genus Laetilia.

The species was described by Harrison Gray Dyar Jr. in 1915. It is found in Puerto Rico.
