= Linsleyonides portoricensis =

Scientific classification
- Kingdom: Animalia
- Phylum: Arthropoda
- Class: Insecta
- Order: Coleoptera
- Suborder: Polyphaga
- Infraorder: Cucujiformia
- Family: Cerambycidae
- Genus: Linsleyonides
- Species: L. portoricensis

Binomial name
- Linsleyonides portoricensis (Fisher, 1932)

Species of beetle

Linsleyonides portoricensis is a species of beetle in the family Cerambycidae. It was described by Fisher in 1932.
