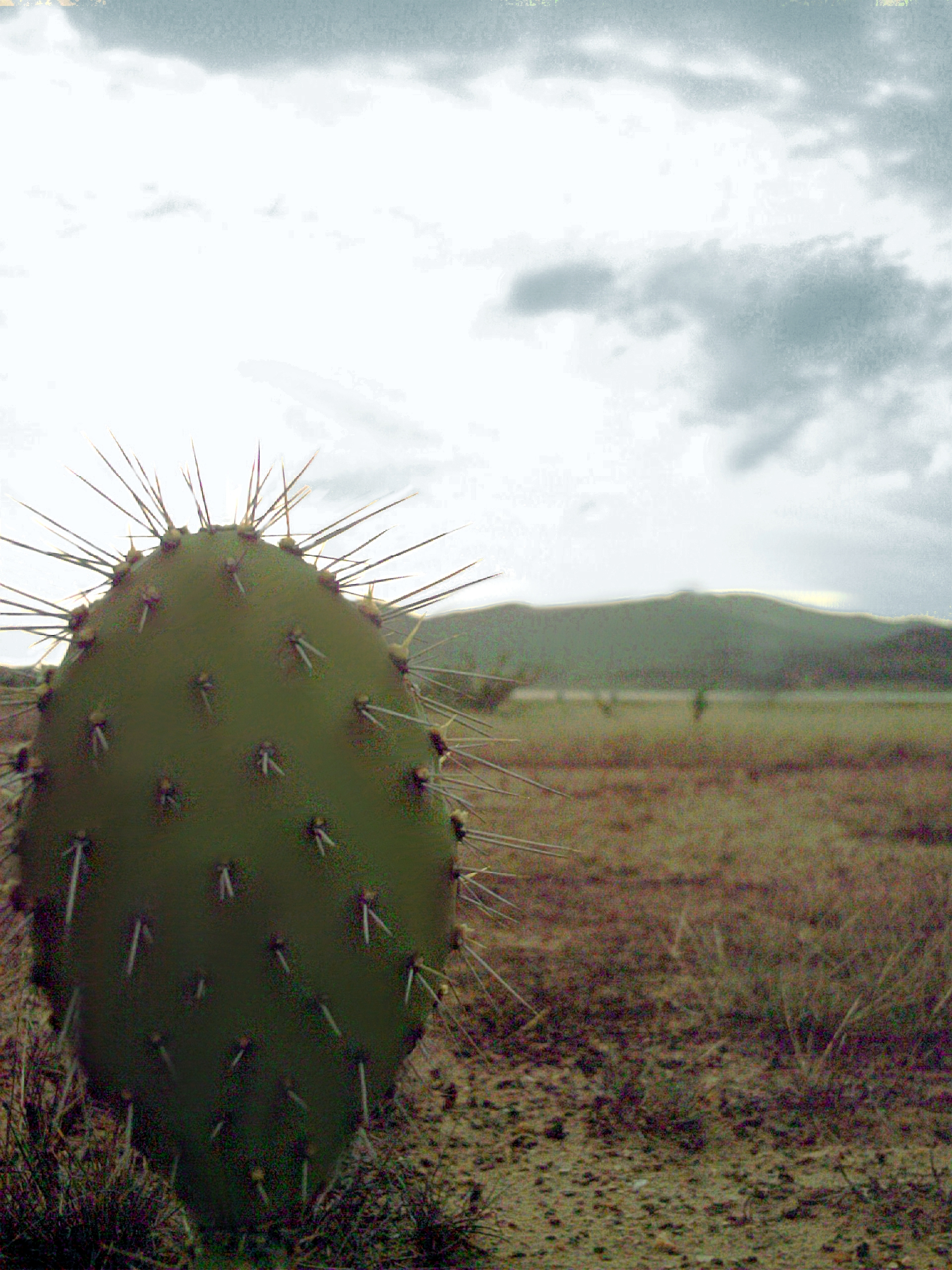

Scientific classification
- Kingdom: Plantae
- Clade: Tracheophytes
- Clade: Angiosperms
- Clade: Eudicots
- Order: Caryophyllales
- Family: Cactaceae
- Genus: Opuntia
- Species: O. tuna

Binomial name
- Opuntia tuna (L.) Mill.

Synonyms
- Opuntia jamaicensis

= Opuntia tuna =

Species of cactus

Opuntia tuna, known as sour pickle, pricklypear, or elephantear pricklypear, is a species of cactus in the genus Opuntia.

== Distribution and habitat ==
Some sources say Opuntia tuna is endemic only to Jamaica. Some say the species is endemic to Hispaniola, Jamaica, and other Caribbean islands. Some sources place the native range from Mexico to Jamaica, including Central America.

The species has been introduced in the southern United States, the greater Caribbean, northern South America, Western Europe, Northern Africa, Madagascar, the Middle East, South and Southeast Asia, and eastern Australia.

Illustration of Opuntia jamaicensis (O. tuna) from The Cactaceae (1919-1923) by Britton et Rose, Vol. I, Plate XIX.

== Taxonomy ==
The first description was in 1753 by Carl Linnaeus as Cactus tuna. Philip Miller described it as Opuntia tuna in 1768. In the early 19th century, it was renamed O. humbles, O. polyanthus, and O. dillenii.

In 2004, a paper in the journal Bradleya claimed that the taxon is a mix between O. tuna sensu (described by Britton & Rose in 1919) and O. dillenii. In 2025, there was a proposal in Taxon to reject the name Opuntia tuna, with the authors arguing that what is being called O. tuna are actually multiple species (one endemic to Jamaica, which they argue should be called O. kingstoniana; and another which should be called O. dillenii).
