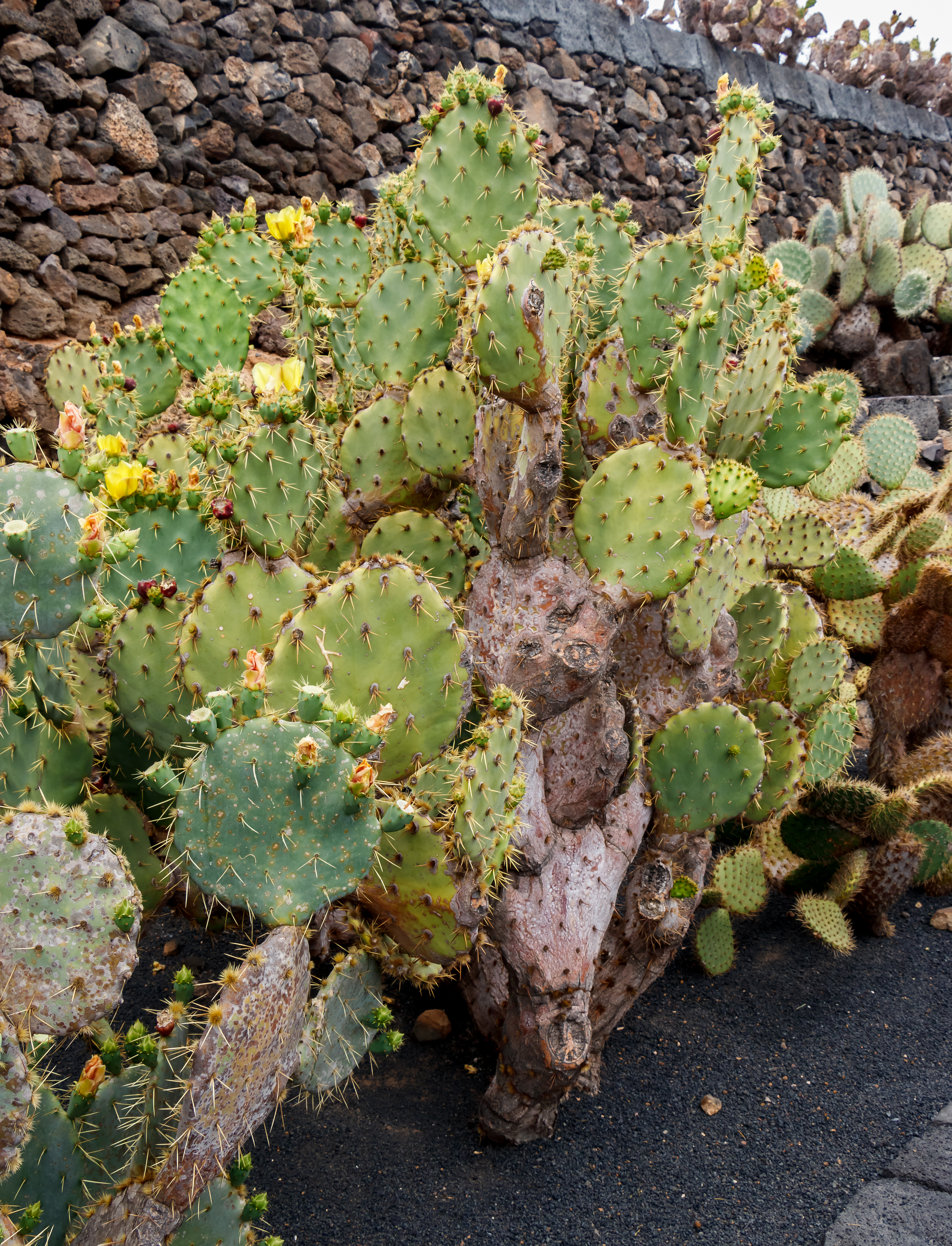

Conservation status
- Least Concern (IUCN 3.1)

Scientific classification
- Kingdom: Plantae
- Clade: Tracheophytes
- Clade: Angiosperms
- Clade: Eudicots
- Order: Caryophyllales
- Family: Cactaceae
- Genus: Opuntia
- Species: O. hyptiacantha

Binomial name
- Opuntia hyptiacantha F.A.C.Weber

= Opuntia hyptiacantha =

Species of cactus

Opuntia hyptiacantha is a plant that belongs to the family Cactaceae. They can be found in Mexico within Durango, Aguascalientes, Zacatecas, San Luis Potosí, Jalisco, Guanajuato, Querétaro, and the State of Mexico.

== Classification and Description ==
It is a tree species, 1.5–5 m high, open branching, sometimes with a canopy almost 2 m in diameter. Defined trunk, 200 x 20 cm, grayish to blackish, spiny, bark with scales in wavy longitudinal bands. Widely obovate cladodes, 22-35 x 15-25 cm wide and 1–3 cm thick. Bright, greenish yellow to dark green-blue, coated with white wax, pruinous. Epidermis glabra, opaque. Areolas arranged in 10-16 series, 2–3 cm distant from each other, circular pyriforms at the base of the cladode and obovate to piriforms at the top, inclusive, 4–6 mm x 2 mm, brown felt in the center and blackish around the areola. Glochids 0.1–1 cm long, greenish yellow. Thorns 3–8 cm, increasing with age, subulated, slightly angulated, divergent, not adpressed, flattened but not twisted 0.2–2 cm long, white with yellow translucent apex .Flowers 9.5 cm long and 9 cm in diameter in the anthesis, yellow; yellow filaments and anthers, pink style, 6 stigma lobes; external segments spatulated with the mucronized apex, light yellow, with a broad, reddish medium band; interior segments spatulated with the mucronized apex, yellow; pericarpel of 4-4.5 cm long. Fruits obovate to subglobose, from light red to intense; with pericarpel thick, 1–3 cm wide, acidic, subcircular to obovate areoles, with yellow felt, yellow gland, and spines 1.2 cm long, deciduous, yellow; red pulp. Floral scar 2.2 cm in diameter, almost flat, 0.7 cm deep. Reniform seeds, angled with narrow white aryl and lateral thread rate.

== Habitat ==
The species is found in tropical wet and dry climates (at least one month in which less than 600 mm of rain falls), although there are also some sites with semi-arid climate (continental arid climate <600 mm) and dry winter subtropical. The wettest month of summer is 10 times higher than the driest month of winter. It can also be found in temperate and cold weather zones, where the humidity conditions are highest, these climates are characteristic of some areas of central Mexico. Average annual temperature is from 20-29 °C, the average annual rainfall varies between 300-1800 mm.

This species mainly inhabits areas where there is volcanic and stony type soil at altitudes from sea level to 1900m.

== Gallery ==
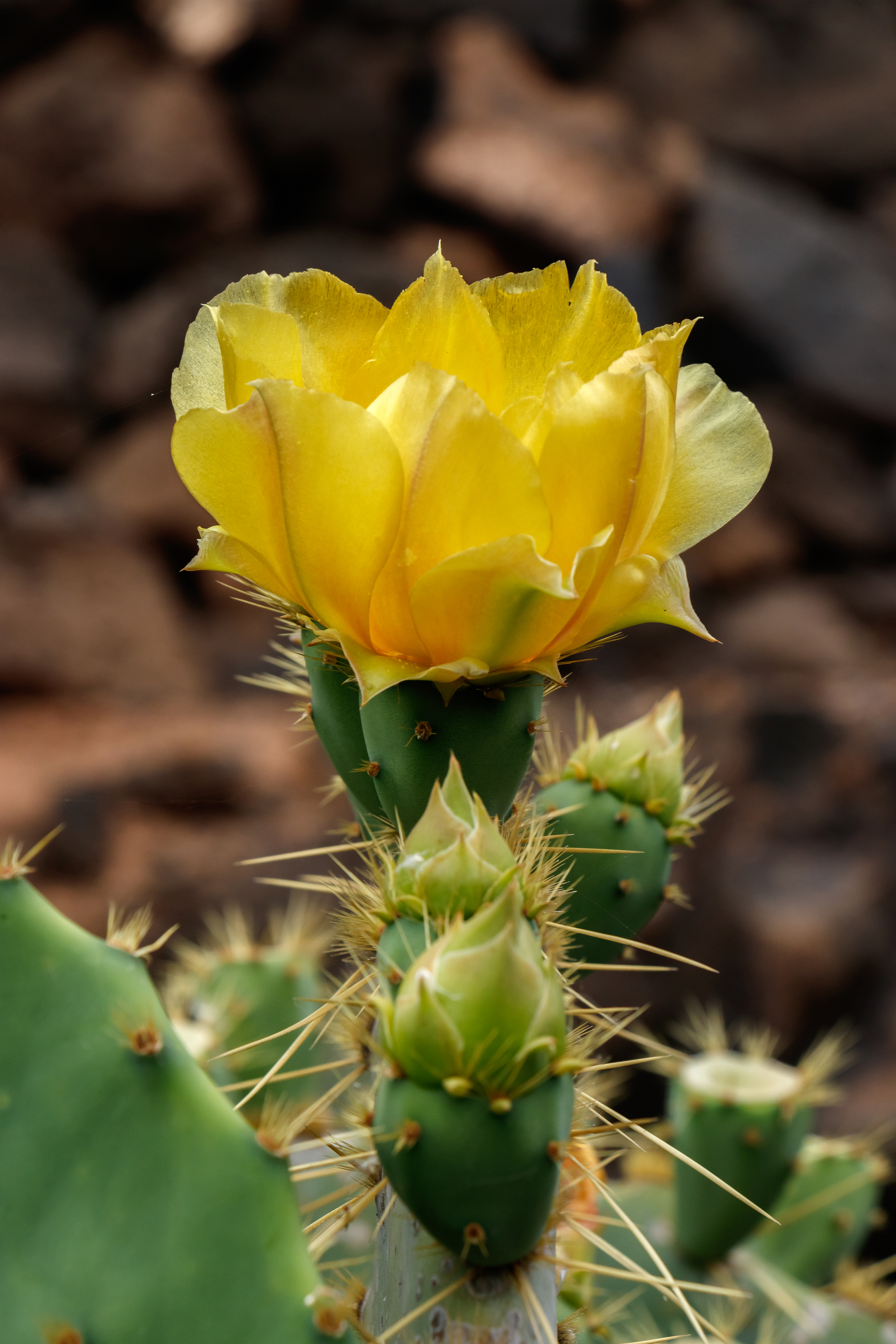
Opuntia hyptiacantha flower

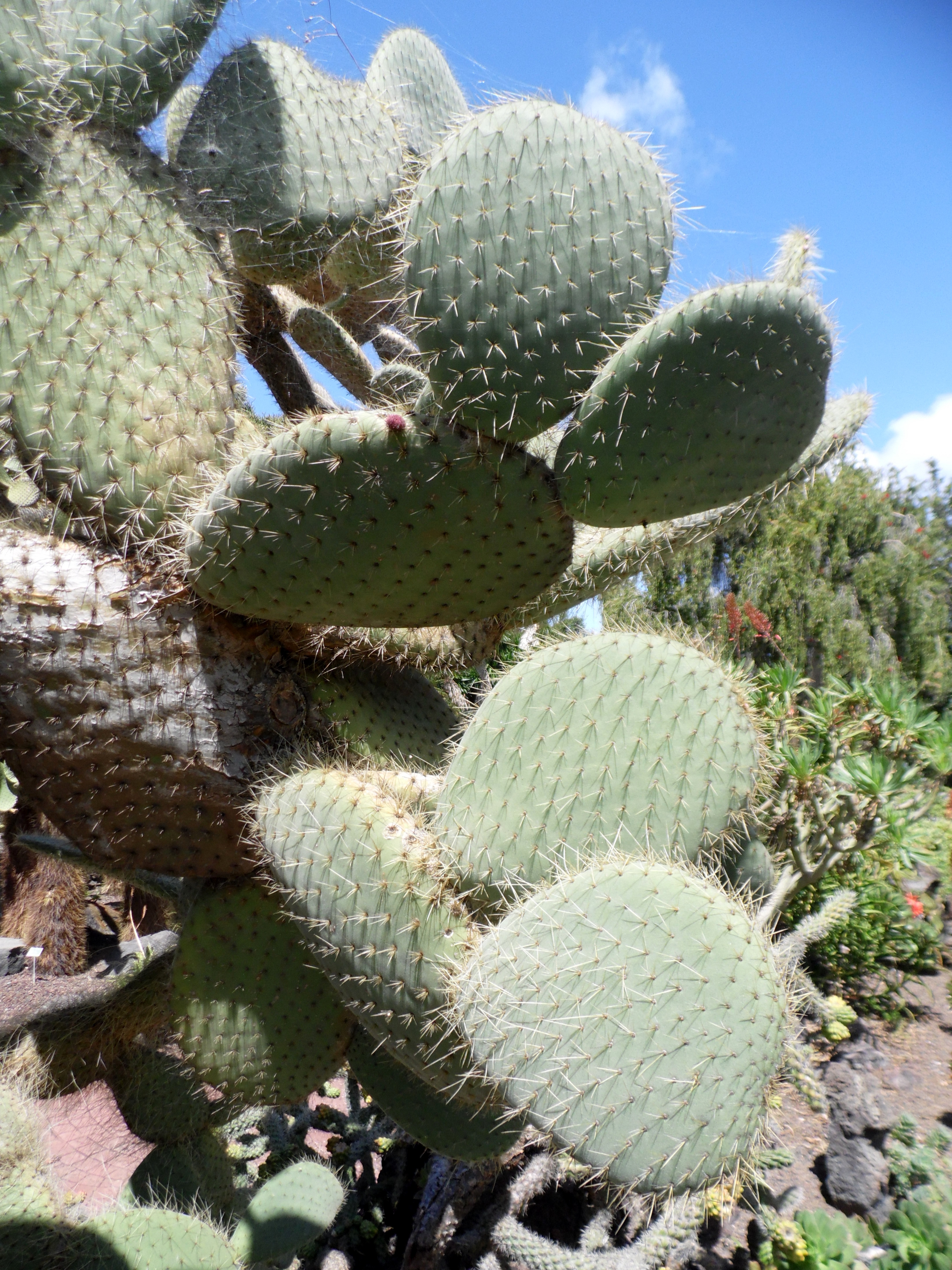
Opuntia hyptiacantha
