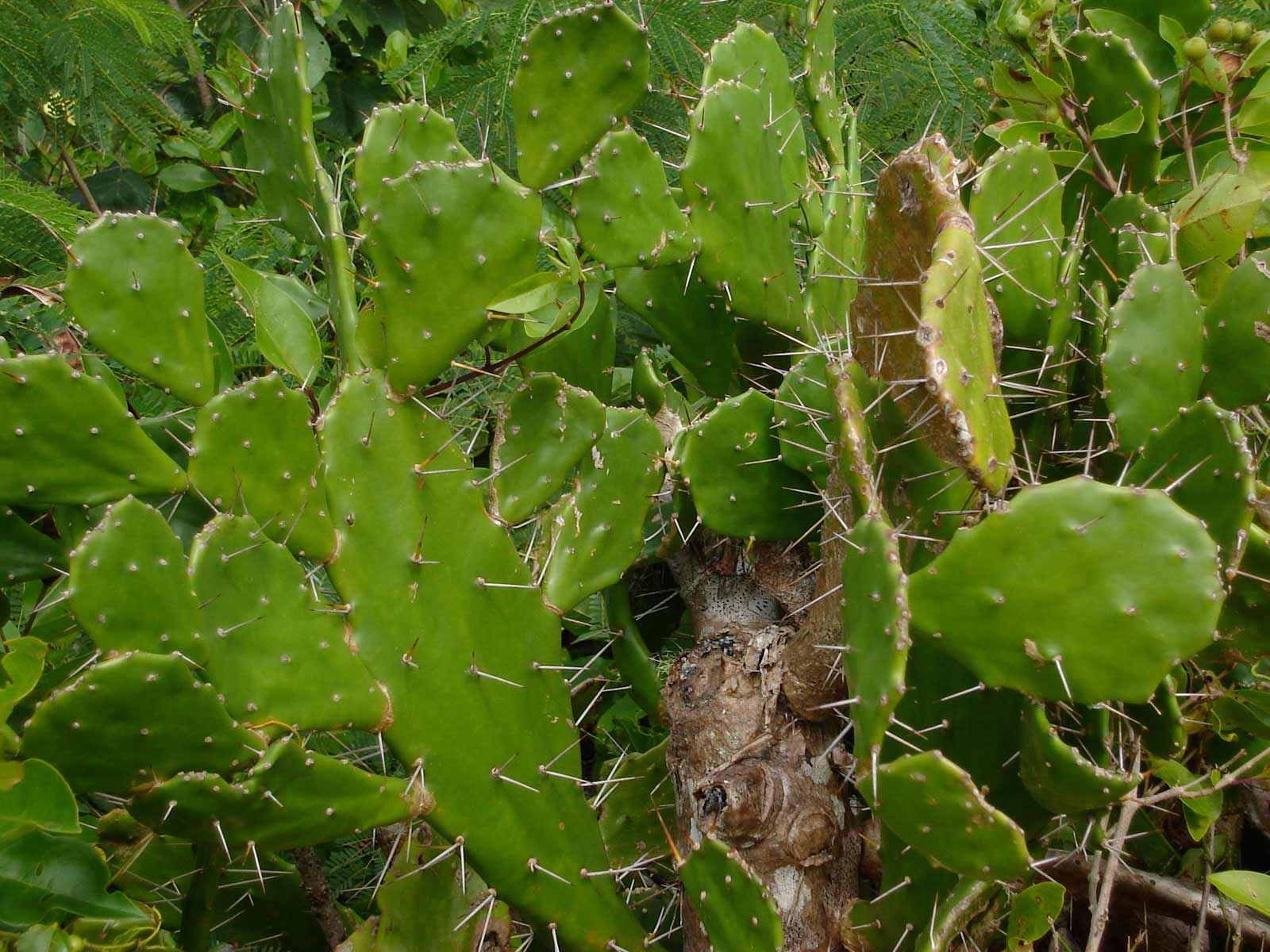

Conservation status
- Least Concern (IUCN 3.1)

Scientific classification
- Kingdom: Plantae
- Clade: Tracheophytes
- Clade: Angiosperms
- Clade: Eudicots
- Order: Caryophyllales
- Family: Cactaceae
- Genus: Opuntia
- Species: O. monacantha

Binomial name
- Opuntia monacantha Haw.

= Opuntia monacantha =

Species of cactus

Opuntia monacantha, commonly known as drooping prickly pear, cochineal prickly pear, or Barbary fig, is a species of plant in the family Cactaceae native to South America.

== Taxonomy ==
The species was first formally described in 1812 by botanist Adrian Haworth in Synopsis Plantarum Succulentarum. The name Opuntia vulgaris, which is a synonym of Opuntia ficus-indica, has been misapplied to this species in Australia. From Adrian Hardy Haworth, the species was in the genus 1819 Opuntia. Many authors, including Nathaniel Lord Britton, Joseph Nelson Rose and Curt Backeberg stated that Opuntia monacantha was just another name for Opuntia vulgaris.

== Description ==
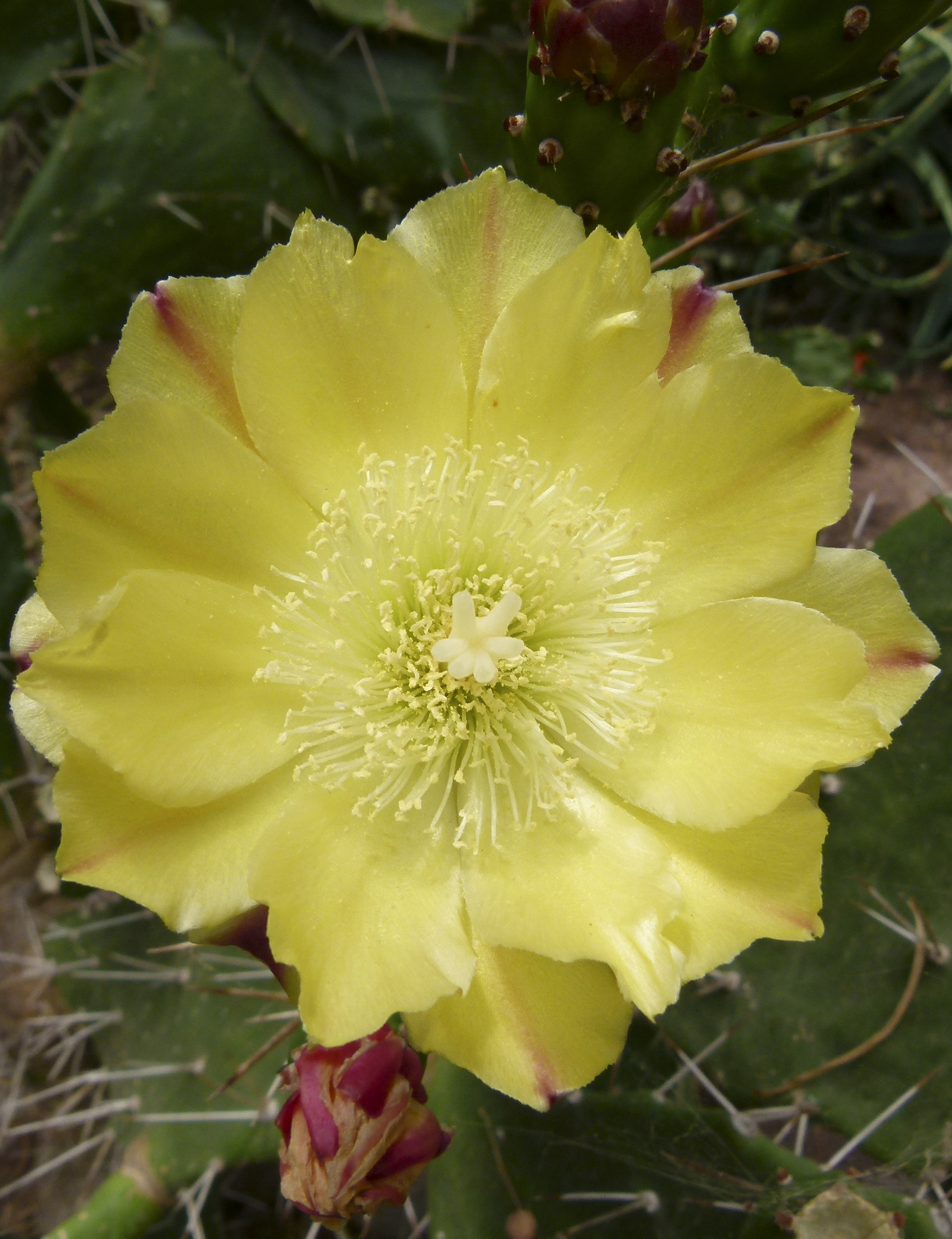
Flower

Opuntia monacantha is a succulent, thorny shrub that grows almost tree-like with several branches and profusely expanded crown in branches that reaches a height of up to 5 meters. The oval to elongated shoots narrowed at the base are shiny green. They are quite thin and 4 to 10 inches long. The widely spaced areoles have brownish glochids. The straight spine (rarely 2 to 3 are present) is brown and between 3 and 4 centimeters long.

The dark yellow flowers reach a diameter of up to 8 centimeters. The pear-shaped, red fruits are spineless and up to 7 centimeters long.

== Distribution ==
It is native to Argentina, Brazil, Paraguay, and Uruguay and is naturalised in Australia and South Africa up to altitudes of 1000 meters. Its natural habitats are subtropical or tropical moist lowland forest and sandy shores.
