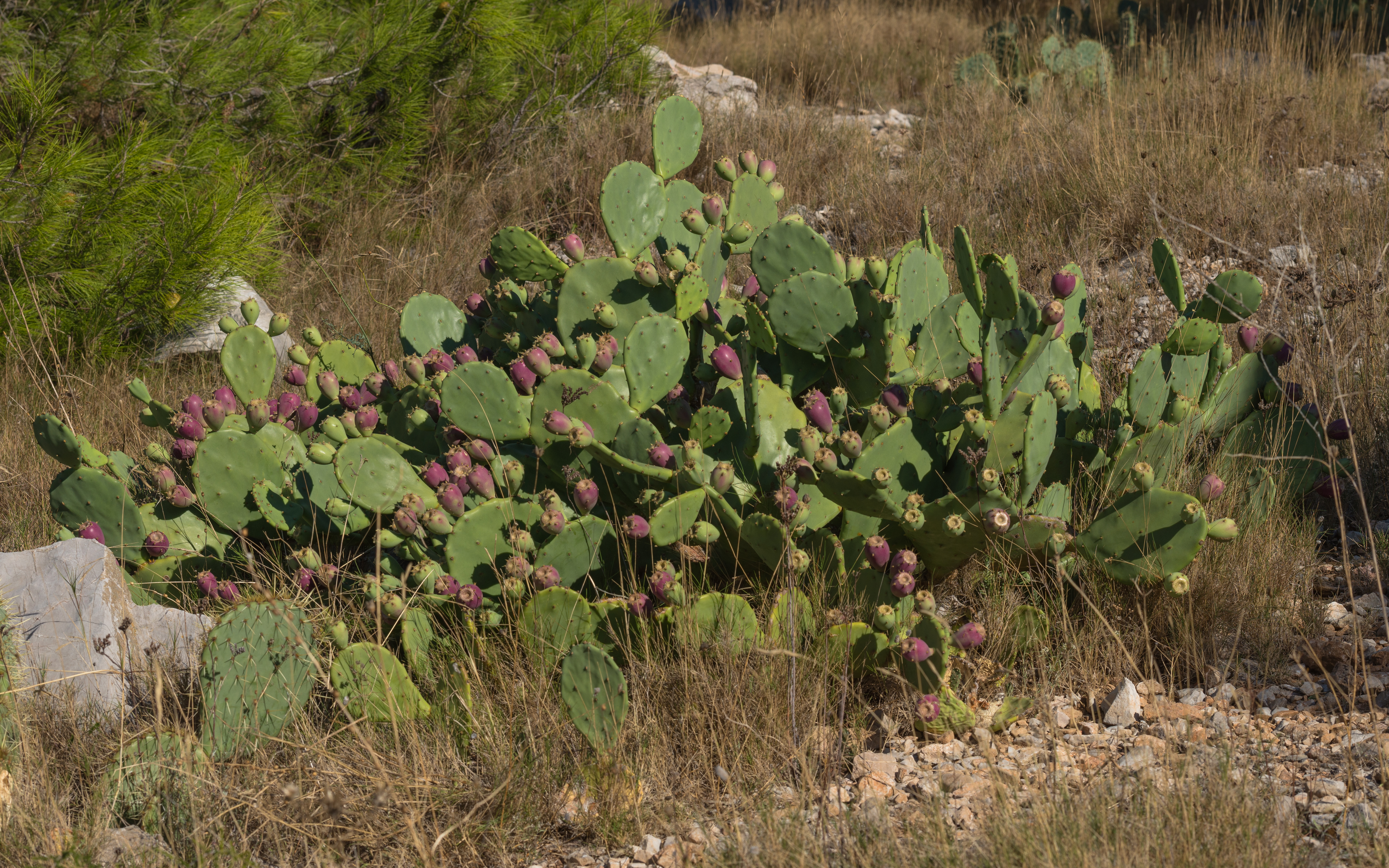
- With fruits

Conservation status
- Least Concern (IUCN 3.1)

- Apparently Secure (NatureServe)

Scientific classification
- Kingdom: Plantae
- Clade: Tracheophytes
- Clade: Angiosperms
- Clade: Eudicots
- Order: Caryophyllales
- Family: Cactaceae
- Genus: Opuntia
- Species: O. stricta

Binomial name
- Opuntia stricta (Haw.) Haw.

Synonyms
- Synonymy: Cactus opuntia var. inermis DC.; Cactus strictus Haw.; Consolea bahamana (Britton & Rose) A.Berger; Opuntia airampo Phil.; Opuntia bahamana Britton & Rose; Opuntia balearica F.A.C.Weber ex Hirscht; Opuntia bartramii Raf.; Opuntia bentonii Griffiths; Opuntia dillenii var. reitzii Scheinvar; Opuntia dillenii var. tehuantepecana Bravo; Opuntia inermis (DC.) DC.; Opuntia keyensis Britton ex Small; Opuntia longiclada Griffiths; Opuntia magnifica Small; Opuntia nejapensis Bravo; Opuntia parva A.Berger; Opuntia stricta subsp. esparzae Scheinvar; Opuntia stricta var. reitzii (Scheinvar) Scheinvar & A.Rodr.; Opuntia tehuantepecana (Bravo) Bravo; Opuntia tenuiflora Small; Opuntia vulgaris var. balaerica F.A.C.Weber; Pilocereus flavispinus Rümpler; Pilocereus nobilis K.Schum.

= Opuntia stricta =

Species of cactus

Opuntia stricta is a species of large cactus that is native to subtropical and tropical coastal areas of the Americas, especially around the Caribbean and the lower East Coast of the United States. Common names include erect prickly pear and nopal estricto (Spanish). The first description as Cactus strictus was published in 1803 by Adrian Hardy Haworth. In 1812 he moved the species to the genus Opuntia.

== Description ==
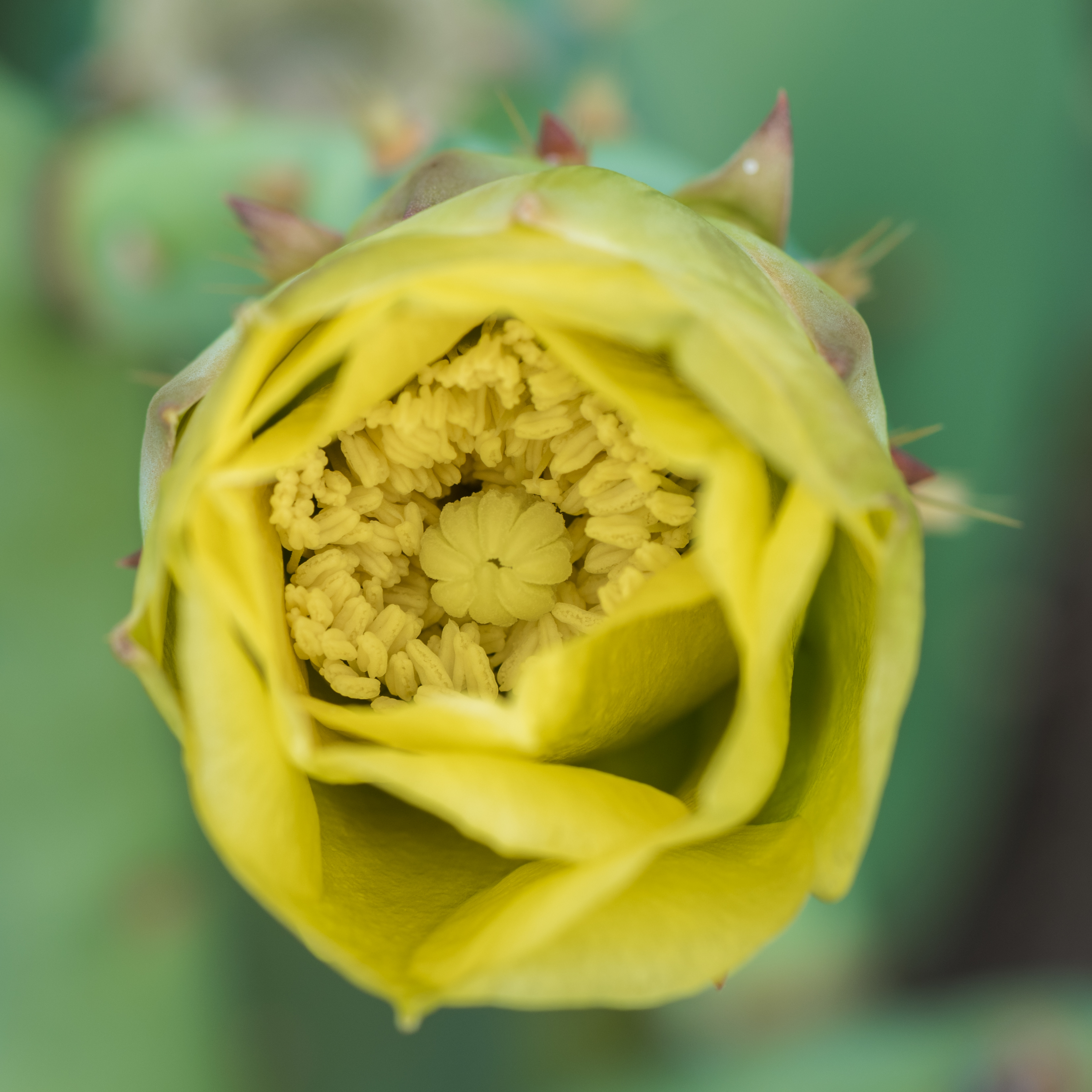
Flower

It is a shrubby, erect plant, extending lengthwise to somewhat upright and reach heights of growth up to 2 m (6.6 ft) in height, producing lemon yellow flowers in the spring and summer, followed by purplish-red fruits. It is quick to colonize hot, open environments with sandy soils. The blue-green shoot sections are bald, flattened, ovate to inverted egg-shaped, and are tapered at the base. They are 25 to 64 cm (10 to 25 inches) long and 15 to 64 cm (6 to 25 inches) inches wide. The brownish areoles are far apart leaving most of the epidermis, with often one or more yellowish spines, at least near the edges and towards the apex. They carry striking, yellow glochids that are 2 to 6 mm (0.079 to 0.236 inches) long. The 1 to 5 awl-shaped spur is flattened, provided with a light barb at the top thorns are yellow. They are perpendicular to the surface of the shoots and are 1.3 to 12.7 cm (0.5 to 5 inches) long.

The yellow to yellowish orange flowers, which are solitary and formed by numerous membranous parts, reach a length of 13 to 15 cm (5 to 6 inches) and a diameter of 10 to 15 cm (4 to 6 inches). The flowers are ephemeral and melliferous. The purple-red, smooth fruits are inverted-egg-shaped and tapered at the base. They are 6.4 to 8.9 cm (2.5 to 3.5 inches) inches long and covered with plenty of glochids and are more or less pyriform, always purple in color, 4 to 6 cm (1.6 to 2.4 inches) in length and contain from 60 to 180 seeds (which may remain viable for more than 10 years), yellow to light brown, incorporated into the fruit pulp. As fruits are appreciated by birds and mammals, their seeds are dispersed by animals. The mucilage inside the leaves is used to treat burns and abscesses. It is edible in the same way as fruits.

== Distribution ==
Opuntia stricta occurs naturally in coastal beach scrub and sandy coastal environments in South Carolina, Georgia, Florida, Louisiana along the Gulf Coast in Texas, Mississippi, and Alabama in the United States, as well as Bermuda, the Caribbean, eastern Mexico, Central America, and northern South America (Venezuela and Ecuador). It is a major component in the understory of Bahamian dry forests in the Bahamas and the Turks and Caicos Islands.

== Invasive species ==
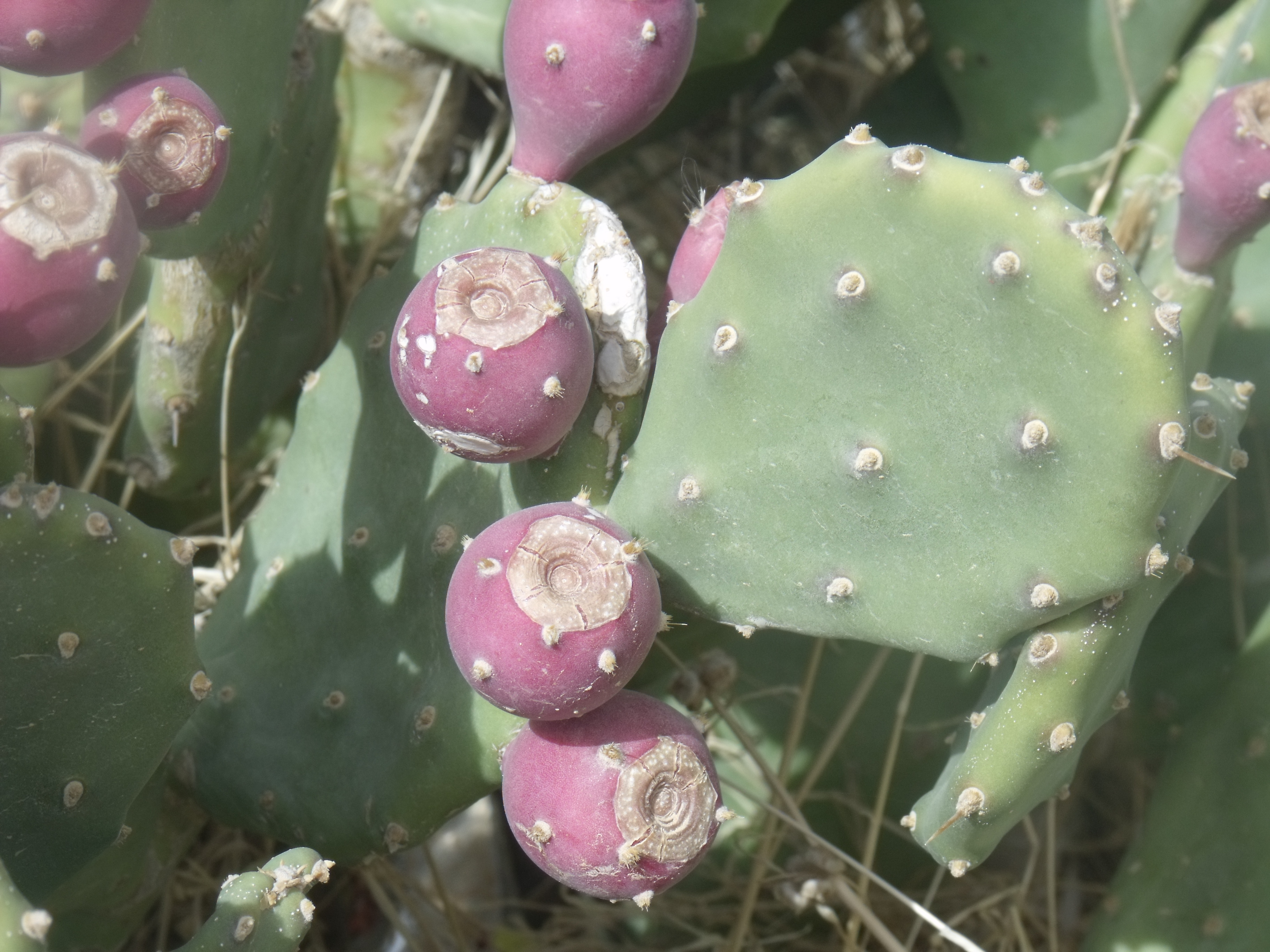
Fruit

Opuntia stricta is listed in the IUCN's "List of the world's 100 worst invasive species". Opuntia stricta has been introduced to other parts of the world, including Africa (including Madagascar), Australia and southern Asia. Opuntia stricta is considered an invasive species in South Africa and Kenya. In Australia it has been the subject of one of the first effective biological control exercises using the moth Cactoblastis cactorum. It was declared a Weed of National Significance by the Australian Weeds Committee in April 2012, but continues to be kept under control by the use of the Cactoblastis moth and a cochineal insect, Dactylopius opuntiae.

In Sri Lanka it has overgrown a 30 kilometres (20 mi) long coastal area between Hambantota and Yala National Park, especially in Bundala National Park, a Ramsar wetland site. It has overgrown several hundreds of hectares (acres) of sand dune areas and adjoining scrub forests and pasture lands. Some areas are so densely covered that they are completely inaccessible for humans and animals. The seeds are spread by macaque monkeys, and perhaps other animals and birds that eat the large fruits. It is also spread by people cutting down the cactus but leaving the cuttings, which then re-sprout where they have fallen. No control measures have been carried out except some costly manual removal of about 10 hectares (25 acres) on the dunes near Bundala village. The cactus is due to invade Yala National Park.

The opposite problem has been encountered in Texas, where Cactoblastis cactorum was first found in Brazoria County in 2017. This species of moth is highly destructive to this (and other) species of cactus native to the southern United States and northern Mexico.

== See also ==
- Bahamian dry forests
- Prickly pears in Australia
