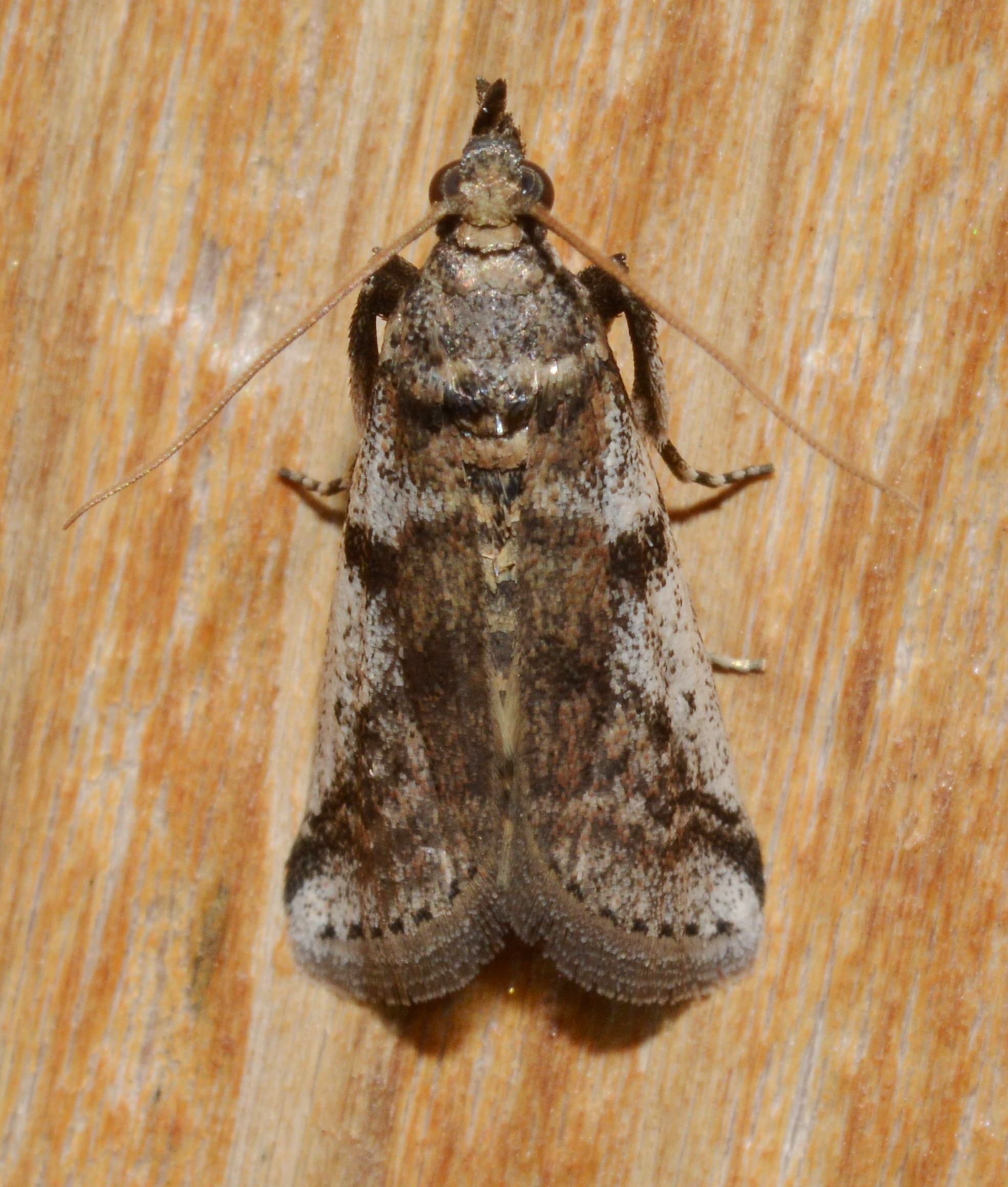
- Imago

Scientific classification
- Kingdom: Animalia
- Phylum: Arthropoda
- Class: Insecta
- Order: Lepidoptera
- Family: Pyralidae
- Genus: Laetilia
- Species: L. coccidivora

Binomial name
- Laetilia coccidivora (Comstock, 1879)

Synonyms
- Dakruma coccidivora Comstock, 1879; Laetilia cardini Dyar, 1918; Atascosa quadricolorella Dyar, 1904

= Laetilia coccidivora =

Species of moth

Laetilia coccidivora, the scale-feeding snout moth, is a species of snout moth in the genus Laetilia. It was described by John Henry Comstock in 1879.

It is found in the southern United States, including California, Florida, Maryland, North Carolina, Ohio, Oklahoma, Texas and West Virginia.

The wingspan is 10–17 mm.

The larvae are predatory on Coccidae species. They feed on the eggs and young. It uses carminic acid, acquired from its prey, as a defence against its own predators.
